= List of Pan American Games medalists in football =

This is the list of Pan American medalists in football.

== Men's tournament ==
Games	Gold	Silver	Bronze
1951	Argentina Ángel Ambrosini; Miguel Ángel Baiocco; Roberto Comaschi; Ángel Cuccero; Norberto Cupo; Rogelio Domínguez; José Giarrizo; Carlos Glini; Roberto Infantino; Juan Intini; Carmelo Longo; Alfredo Martínez; Juan Carlos Mendiburu; Manuel Miranda; Carlos Mousegne; Enrique Olivero; José Pellejero; Arturo Rodenak; René Segini; Perfecto Seijo; Alejandro Simion; Osvaldo Vallone (HC – Guillermo Stabile)	Costa Rica Carlos Alvarado; Rodolfo Sanabria; Mario Cordero; Alex Sánchez; Nelson Morera; José Luis Quesada; León Alvarado; Elías Valenciano; Constantino Tulio Quiros; Héctor Julio González; Evelio Alpizar; Sigifrido Alvarado; Álvaro Murillo; Rodolfo Herrera; Miguel Ángel Zeledón; José Manuel Retana; Rafael Ángel García; Alberto Armijo; Walker Rodríguez; Rafael Campos; Jorge Quesada; Raúl Jiménez (HC – (El Salvador) Ricardo Saprissa & Luís Cartín)	Chile Mario Pizarro; Alberto Cerda; Domingo Massaro; Jorge García; Isaac Carrasco; Salvador Arenas; Hugo Núñez; Alberto Rojas; Ernesto Saavedra; Arnoldo Weber; Roberto Apiolaza; Jorge Villablanca; Sergio Esquivel; Pedro Araya; Javier Briones; Sergio González; Orlando Labbé; Gerardo Valenzuela; Óscar Mogollones; David Buzada (HC – Luis Tirado)
1955	Argentina Leonardo Bevilacqua; Norberto Anido; Manuel Castillo; Juan Carlos Malazzo; Óscar Claria; Ricardo Pegnotti; Ricardo Scialino; Héctor Molina; Norberto Menéndez; José Sanfilippo; José Yudica; Antonio Pérsico; Ricardo Campana; Humberto Maschio; Juan Jesús Moreno; Oscar Stortini; Julio Nuin; Tomás Anglese (HC – Guillermo Stabile)	Mexico José Luis Sánchez; Primitivo Carrillo; Jorge Rodríguez; Eduardo Colmenero; Juan Arrieta; Francisco Pérez; Arturo Vargas; Agustín Díaz; Francisco Noriega; Ramón Sigifredo Mercado; Felipe Negrete; Juan Bosco Martínez; Víctor Nava; Fernando López; Alfonso González; Joaquín Fierro; Elías Vázquez; Gustavo Ríos; Ramón Martínez; Alfredo Hernández; Héctor Segura; Gonzalo Guerrero (HC – (Spain) Antonio López Herranz)	Netherlands Antilles Ergilio Hato; Pedro Matrona; Wilfred de Lannoy; Moises Bicentini; Ludgero Adoptie; Guillermo Giribaldi; Willys Heyliger; Ronald de Lannoy; Hubert Schoop; Eustáquio Bernardina; Júlio Jansen; Wilhelm Canword; Edmundo Vlinder; Luis Antonio Brion; Raymundo Kemp; Francisco Romualdo Gomez; Marco Tromp; Pedro Koolman; Jose Arcangel La Rosa; Antonio Klabeer; Hubert Hoek; Erno Jansen (HC – (Brazil) Pedro Celestino da Cunha)
1959	Argentina Miguel Basílico; Roberto Blanco; Roberto Bonnano; Alberto Corradini; Pedro de Ciancio; José Díaz; Domingo Lejona; Dardo Migoni; Juan Carlos Oleniak; Raúl Adolfo Pérez; Héctor Readigós; Domingo Rodríguez; Carlos Saldías; Héctor Scardulla; Antonio Spilinga; Osmar Stelman; Juan Stork; José Vázquez; Miguel Villafañe (HC – Ernesto Duchini)	Brazil Beyruth; Carlos Alberto; China; Dary; Décio; Edílson; Edmar; Edson Borracha; Françoso; Germano; Gérson; Hércules; Hilton; Humberto; Manoelzinho; Manuel; Maranhão; Nélson; Ouraci; Roberto Rodrigues; Rubens; Villadonega; Zé Maria (HC – Newton Cardoso)	United States Victor Ottobini; Jacob Ruscheinski; Willy Schaller; Joe Speca; John Traina; Herman Wecke; Alex Ely; Val Pelizzaro; Zenon Snylyk; George Brown; Rolf Ganger; Gene Grabowski; Yuriy Kulishenko; Bill Looby; Ron Maierhofer; Ed Murphy; Jim Strachrowsky; Al Zerhusen (HC – Jim Reed)
1963	Brazil Adevaldo; Arlindo; Aírton; Cardoso; Carlos Alberto; Décio Bianco; Dirceu; Evaldo; Heitor Perroca; Hélio Dias; Íris; Jairzinho; Luiz Henrique; Menotti; Nenê; Othon; Riva; Valdir Vicente; Santo; Zé Carlos (HC – Antoninho)	Argentina Abel Vieytez; Agustín Cejas; Enry Barale; Héctor Sabás; José Magiolo; José Paflik; Juan Carlos Guzmán; Juan Carlos Oleniak; Juan Carlos Sarnari; Néstor Sanguinetti; Néstor Manfredi; Osmar Miguelucci; Osvaldo Ferreño; Raúl Oscar Pérez; Raúl Salvio; Reynaldo Aimonetti; Roberto Canosa; Roberto Santiago; Roberto Telch; Sergio Cantú (HC – Ernesto Duchini)	Chile Carlos Lavín; Domingo Araneda; Domingo Barrera; Gilberto Trasiaviña; Gregorio Silva; Haroldo Peña; Héctor Dávila; Héctor Holz; Ismael Manterola; Juan Carlos Esquivel; Juan Torres; José Sánchez; Manuel Montecinos; Óscar Cifuentes; Pedro Bustamante; Pedro González; Ramón Valencia; Raúl Angulo; Raúl Guevara; Víctor Pacheco (HC – Luis Álamos)
1967	Mexico Javier Vargas Rueda; Gilberto Rodríguez Rivera; Juan Manuel Alejándrez; Carlos Albert Llorente; Mario Guadarrama; José Humberto Villaseñor; Javier Bazán; Luis Regueiro; Héctor Pulido; Alberto Onofre Cervantes; Juan Dosal; José Jesús Prado; Vicente Pereda; Luis Estrada Luévano; Manuel Lapuente; Manuel Cerda Canela; Fernando Castañeda; Juan Alvarado (HC – Ignacio Trelles)	Bermuda Dennis Wainright; Earlston Jennings; Rudolph Minors; Irving Romaine; Noel Simons; Rudolph Smith; Gladwin Daniels; Gary Darrell; Kenneth Cann; Lionel Smith; Edward Ming Cann; Gordon Cholmondeley; Lerroy Lewis; Willian Cann; Clyde Best; Winston Trott; Carlton Dill; Marcus Douglas (HC – (England) Graham Adams)	Trinidad and Tobago Lincoln Abraham Phillips; Jean Mouttet; Tyronne Labastide; Aldwin Ferguson; Selwyn Murren; Hugh Mulzac; David Armin; Victor Gamaldo; Joseph Sedley; Bertrand Grell; Andrew Aleong; Alvin Corneal; Gerry Browne; Kelvin Berassa; Patrick Small; Jeff Gellineau; Richard Steward (HC – Conrad Braithwhite)
1971	Argentina Hugo Abdala; Osvaldo Batocletti; José Orlando Berta; Horacio Bongiovanni; Roberto Cabral; Edgardo Di Meola; Alberto Jorge; Francisco Lavorato; Miguel Ángel Leyes; Ángel Mendoza; Carlos Montenegro; Raúl Nogués; Luis Oruezábal; Osvaldo Potente; Andrés Rebottaro; Alberto Romero; Héctor Scotta; Alejandro Simion; Roberto Telch; Osvaldo Vallone; Enrique Vidallé; Abel Vieitez (HC – Rubén Bravo)	Colombia Armando Neiva; Hernando García; Francisco Maturana; José Álvaro Calle; Héctor Escobar; José Zárate; Ángel Maria Torres; Jaime Morón; Andrés Pérez; Nelson Torres; Byron Hernández; Orlando Rico; Gerardo Franco Carbonell; Edgar Díaz; Francisco González; Carlos Monsalve; Leopoldo Rivas; Miguel Quintero; Juan Quintero; Héctor Céspedes (HC – (Paraguay) César López Fretes)	Cuba José Francisco Reinoso; William Barracks; Lorenzo Sotomayor; Luis Holmanza; Miguel Rivero; René Bonora; Antonio Garcés; Gabriel Valenzuela; Carlos Henry Bracha; Andrés Roldán; Luis Hernández; Orestes Pérez Hernández; Francisco Fariñas; Jorge Massó; José Luis Elejalde; José Verdecia; Francisco Piedra; Carlos Arcuy (HC – (North Korea) Kim Yong-ha)
1975	Brazil 1 – Carlos; 2 – Rosemiro; 3 – Tecão; 4 – Bianchi; 5 – Chico Fraga; 6 – Batista; 7 – Pitta; 8 – Carlinhos; 9 – Marcelo Oliveira; 10 – Cláudio Adão; 11 – Tiquinho; 12 – Cassano; 13 – Mauro Cabeção; 14 – Edinho; 15 – Alberto Leguelé; 16 – Luiz Alberto; 17 – Eudes; 18 – Erivelto; 19 – Santos; 20 – Zé Carlos (HC – Zizinho)	None awarded (tie for gold)	Argentina 1 – Carlos Suárez; 2 – Daniel Valencia; 3 – Aldo Espinoza; 4 – Manuel Pereyra; 5 – Luis Galván; 6 – Pablo Cárdenas; 7 – Ricardo Alonso; 8 – Eduardo Marillack; 9 – Santiago Tello; 10 – Américo Gallego; 11 – Pedro Agustín Fernández; 12 – Alberto Vivaldo; 13 – Pedro Evaristo Farías; 14 – Carlos Salinas; 15 – Jorge Salas; 16 – Sergio Fortunato; 17 – Juan Silva; 18 – José Luis Ceballos (HC – César Luis Menotti)
1975	Mexico 1 – Julio Gómez; 2 – Gabriel Márquez; 3 – Eduardo Rergis; 4 – Bardomiano Viveros; 5 – Mario Carrillo; 6 – Ernesto de la Rosa; 7 – José Luis Caballero; 8 – Guillermo Cosio; 9 – Héctor Tapia; 10 – Víctor Rangel; 11 – Hugo Sánchez; 12 – Javier Regalado; 13 – Carlos García Cuevas; 14 – Jorge López Malo; 15 – Francisco Bugarín; 16 – Alberto Sandoval; 17 – Alfredo Navarrete; 18 – Víctor Gómez; 19 – Rafael Toribio; 20 – Oscar Mascorro (HC – Diego Mercado)	None awarded (tie for gold)	Argentina 1 – Carlos Suárez; 2 – Daniel Valencia; 3 – Aldo Espinoza; 4 – Manuel Pereyra; 5 – Luis Galván; 6 – Pablo Cárdenas; 7 – Ricardo Alonso; 8 – Eduardo Marillack; 9 – Santiago Tello; 10 – Américo Gallego; 11 – Pedro Agustín Fernández; 12 – Alberto Vivaldo; 13 – Pedro Evaristo Farías; 14 – Carlos Salinas; 15 – Jorge Salas; 16 – Sergio Fortunato; 17 – Juan Silva; 18 – José Luis Ceballos (HC – César Luis Menotti)
1979	Brazil 1 – Solitinho; 2 – Luís Cláudio; 3 – Wagner Basílio; 4 – Valdoir; 5 – Vítor; 6 – João Luiz; 7 – Mica; 8 – Cléo; 9 – Silva; 10 – Jackson; 11 – Silvinho; 12 – Luís Henrique; 13 – Oswaldo; 14 – Édson Boaro; 15 – Gilcimar; 16 – Rogério; 17 – Cristovão; 18 – Jérson (HC – Mário Travaglini)	Cuba 1 – José Francisco Reinoso; 2 – Francisco López Ríos; 3 – Raimundo Frometa; 4 – Luis Sánchez; 7 – Andrés Roldán; 8 – Amado Povea; 9 – Dagoberto Lara; 10 – Ramón Núñez; 11 – Jorge Maya; 12 – Luis Dreke; 13 – Pedro Fenton; 14 – Regino Delgado; 15 – Jorge Massó; 17 – Carlos Loredo; 18 – Guillermo Mestre; 19 – Roberto Pereira; 20 – Fermín Hugo Madera; 21 – Calixto Martínez (HC – Roberto Hernández)	Argentina 1 – Oscar Rogélio Quiroga; 2 – José Omar Beccerica; 3 – Victorio Ocaño; 4 – Lucio Del Mul; 5 – Juan Cabrera; 6 – Víctor Binello; 7 – Héctor Boccanelli; 8 – Eusebio Roldán; 9 – Víctor Sosa; 10 – Salvador Mastrosimone; 11 – Antonio Alderete; 12 – Guillermo Bosio; 13 – Enrique Veloso; 14 – Luis Rolfo; 15 – Roberto Gasparini; 16 – Marcelo Fredes; 17 – Luis Amuchástegui; 18 – Osvaldo Coloccini (HC – Roberto Saporiti)
1983	Uruguay José Luis Sosa; Mario Picún; Gualberto de los Santos; Alvaro Pérez; José Batista; Juan Rabino; Abraham Yeladián; Santiago Ostolaza; Vicente Rudy Rodríguez; Ricardo Perdomo; Daniel Carreño; Luis Heimen; Carlos Larrañaga; Víctor Púa; Edgardo Martirena; Aldo Azzinari; Julio Rivadavia; Miguel Peirano (HC – Óscar Tabárez)	Brazil Adalberto; Boni; Brigatti; Dunga; Edson Souza; Everaldo; Guto; Heitor; Helinho; Hugo; Jorginho; Marcus Vinícius; Marquinhos; Mauricinho; Neto; Paulinho; Paulo César; Paulo Sérgio; Waldir (HC – Gílson Nunes)	Guatemala Ricardo Jérez; Hermenegildo Pepp; Guillermo Rodríguez; David Gardiner; Benjamín Monterroso; Édgar Salguero; Víctor Hugo Monzón; Jorge Fernández; José Bobadilla; Walter Claverí; Julio Gómez; Julio Rubén Paredes; Victor Hugo Méndez; Júlio de la Roca; Eddy Alburez; Boris Ortiz; Otto Mynor; Byron Pérez (HC – (Argentina) Carlos Cavagnaro)
1987	Brazil 1 – Pereira; 2 – Careca; 3 – Geraldão; 4 – Ricardo Rocha; 5 – Douglas; 6 – Nelsinho; 7 – Valdo; 8 – Raí; 9 – Washington; 10 – Edu Marangon; 11 – Luís Carlos; 12 – Taffarel; 13 – Pita; 14 – João Paulo; 15 – Evair; 16 – Ademir; 17 – Ricardo Gomes; 18 – André Cruz (HC – Carlos Alberto Silva)	Chile Miguel Ardiman; Luis Ceballos; Nelson Enríquez; Claudio Figueroa; Eduardo Fournier; Héctor Francino; Osvaldo Gómez; Aníbal González; Juan González; Francisco Hörmann; Fernando Medina; Jorge Pérez; Germán Pino; René Pinto; Marco Tamayo; Claudio Tello; Patricio Toledo; Iván Zamorano (HC – Eugenio Jara)	Argentina Gustavo Acosta; Oscar Acosta; Mauro Airez; Favio Almirón; Jorge Bartero; Fabián Basualdo; Fabián Cancelarich; Oscar Dertycia; Gustavo Dezotti; Néstor Fabbri; José Fantaguzzi; Blas Giunta; Humberto Gutiérrez; Carlos Mac Allister; Víctor Marchesini; Alejandro Russo; Darío Siviski; Jorge Theiler (HC – Carlos Pachamé)
1991	United States 1 – Kasey Keller; 2 – Cam Rast; 3 – Curt Onalfo; 4 – Michael Burns; 5 – Erik Imler; 6 – Dario Brose; 7 – Yari Allnutt; 8 – Mike Lapper; 9 – Dante Washington; 10 – Claudio Reyna; 11 – Manny Lagos; 12 – Cobi Jones; 13 – Joe Moore; 14 – Eloy Salgado; 15 – Rhett Harty; 16 – Steve Snow; 17 – Brad Friedel; 18 – Alexi Lalas (HC – (Germany) Lothar Osiander)	Mexico 1 – Sergio Bernal; 2 – Ricardo Cadena; 3 – Antonio Noriega; 4 – Rodolfo Sánchez; 5 – Joaquín Hernández; 6 – Agustín Valdez; 7 – Leopoldo Castañeda; 8 – Jorge Castañeda; 9 – Carlos Nápoles; 10 – Ramón Ramírez; 11 – Gerardo Mascareño; 12 – Alejandro Herrera; 13 – Camilo Romero; 14 – Salvador Mariscal; 15 – Felipe Peña; 16 – Ramiro Romero; 17 – Donato Castañeda; 18 – David Rangel (HC – Manuel Lapuente)	Cuba 1 – Elio Sánchez; 2 – Luis Elizalde; 3 – Alfredo Maury; 4 – Rafael Ayllon; 5 – Julio C. Díaz; 6 – Jorge Pérez; 7 – Maximiliano Sánchez; 8 – Alfredo González; 9 – Lázaro Darcourt; 10 – Manuel Bobadilla; 11 – Bernardo Rosette; 12 – Víctor Pérez; 13 – Juan C. Montalvo; 14 – Ariel Álvarez; 15 – Osmín Hernández; 16 – Alexis Guzmán; 17 – Pedro Báez; 18 – Wilfredo Carbo (HC – (Italy) Giovanni Campari)
1995	Argentina 1 – Carlos Bossio; 2 – Roberto Ayala; 3 – Rodolfo Arruabarrena; 4 – Javier Zanetti; 5 – Jorge Jiménez; 6 – Pablo Rotchen; 7 – Ariel Ortega; 8 – Roberto Monserrat; 9 – Sebastián Rambert; 10 – Marcelo Gallardo; 11 – Christian Bassedas; 12 – Javier Lavallén; 13 – Juan Pablo Sorín; 14 – Pablo Paz; 15 – Claudio Husaín; 16 – Diego Cagna; 17 – Hernán Crespo; 18 – Guillermo Schelotto (HC - Daniel Passarella)	Mexico 1 – Óscar Pérez; 2 – Pável Pardo; 3 – Marcos Ayala; 4 – Braulio Luna; 5 – Edson Astivia; 6 – Raúl Lara; 7 – Luis Hernández; 8 – Germán Villa; 9 – Luis M. Salvador; 10 – Rafael García; 11 – Cuauhtémoc Blanco; 12 – Oswaldo Sánchez; 13 – Ricardo Munguía; 14 – Jesús Arellano; 15 – Agustín García; 16 – Manuel Sol; 17 – Gustavo Nápoles; 18 – Edson Alvarado (HC - Guillermo Vázquez Mejía)	Colombia 1 – Óscar Córdoba; 2 – Wilmer Ortegón; 3 – Juan D. Vélez; 4 – Juan C. Beltrán; 5 – Jorge Peláez; 6 – José A. Valencia; 7 – Henry Zambrano; 8 – Arley Betancourth; 9 – Harry Castillo; 10 – Oswaldo Mackenzie; 11 – Alonso Alcíbar; 12 – Daniel A. Vélez; 13 – Víctor Mafla; 14 – Martín Zapata; 15 – Arley Dinas; 16 – Luis Quiñonez; 17 – Jersson González; 18 – Hámilton Ricard (HC – Norberto Peluffo)
1999	Mexico Alexandro Álvarez; Álvaro Ortiz; Jesús Mendoza; Gerardo Torres; Juan Pablo Rodríguez; Joaquín Beltrán; Mario Méndez; Julio Estrada; Ignacio Hierro; Carlos Cariño; Adrián Sánchez; Emilio Mora; Víctor Santibáñez; Óscar Mascorro; Héctor Altamirano; Christian Martínez (HC – José Luis Real)	Honduras Carlos Escobar; Carlos Salinas; Elmer Montoya; Francisco Pavón; Luis Ramírez; Héctor Gutiérrez; Danilo Turcios; Iván Guerrero; Jaime Rosales; Jairo Martínez; Júnior Izaguirre; Mario Chirinos; Noel Valladares; Julio César Suazo; Julio César de León; Reynaldo Pineda; Hesler Phillips (HC – Ramón Maradiaga)	United States Tim Howard; Carlos Bocanegra; Nelson Akwari; Danny Califf; Steve Shak; Evan Whitfield; DeMarcus Beasley; Jason Cropley; Cory Gibbs; Peter Vagenas; Sasha Victorine; Adin Brown; Brian Winters; Chris Albright; Connor Casey; Landon Donovan; Taylor Twellman; Michael Pries (HC – Clive Charles)
2003	Argentina Gustavo Eberto; Walter García; Raúl Gorostegui; Joel Barbosa; Hugo Colace; Jonathan Bottinelli; Marcos Aguirre; Alejandro Alonso; Maximiliano López; Franco Cángele; Osmar Ferreyra; Nicolás Navarro; Marcos Galarza; Pablo Barzola; Alexis Cabrera; Jesús Méndez; Franco Sanchírico; Ezequiel Lázaro; Roberto Cornejo; Emanuel Perrone (HC – Miguel Tojo)	Brazil 1 – Fernando Henrique; 2 – Simão; 3 – Gabriel Santos; 4 – Adaílton; 5 – Jardel; 6 – Moreno; 7 – Marcelo Nicácio; 8 – Dudu Cearense; 9 – Cleiton Xavier; 10 – William; 11 – Dagoberto; 12 – Jefferson; 13 – Coelho; 14 – Leandro; 15 – Irineu; 16 – Wendel; 17 – Vágner Love; 18 – Diego Souza (HC – Valinhos)	Mexico José de Jesús Corona; Aarón Galindo; Ismael Rodríguez; Diego Martínez; Jaime Durán; Juan Carlos Medina; Juan Pablo García; Fausto Pinto; Cosme Castro; Leonel Olmedo; Luis Ernesto Pérez; Cirilo Saucedo; Alberto Medina; Juan de la Cruz; Gerardo Espinoza; Juan Carlos Cacho (HC – (Argentina) Ricardo La Volpe)
2007	Ecuador 1 – Máximo Banguera; 2 – Wilson Folleco; 3 – Deison Méndez; 4 – Michael Castro; 5 – Jefferson Pinto; 6 – Hamilton Chasi; 7 – Jesús Alcivar; 8 – Jefferson Montero; 9 – Edmundo Zura; 10 – Alex Alcivar; 11 – Fabricio Guevara; 12 – Germán Vera; 13 – Carlos Delgado; 14 – Alex George; 15 – Eduardo Bone; 16 – Israel Chango; 17 – Fidel Martínez; 18 – Pablo Ochoa (HC – Sixto Vizuete)	Jamaica Dwayne Miller; Andrae Campbell; Ajuran Brown; Jermaine Jarrett; Ricardo Cousins; Eric Vernan; Keammar Daley; James Thomas; Edward Campbell; Obrian Woodbine; Duwayne Kerr; Alanzo Adlam; Dawyne Smith; John-Ross Doyley; Norman Bailey; Damaine Thompson; Troy Smith; Draion McNain (HC – Wendell Downswell)	Mexico Sergio Arias; Christian Sánchez; Marco Iván Pérez; Hugo Ayala; José Óscar Recio; Alejandro Berber; Raul Martínez; Rodolfo Salinas; Enrique Esqueda; Moises Adrián Velasco; Emmanuel Cerda; Aaron Fernández; Ever Arsénio Gúzman; José Jonathan Piña; Eduardo Barrón; Mario Gallegos; Jorge Torres; Rodolfo del Real (HC – René García)
2011	Mexico 1 – José de Jesús Corona; 2 – Hugo Rodríguez; 3 – Hiram Mier; 4 – Néstor Araujo; 5 – Dárvin Chávez; 6 – Jesús Zavala; 7 – Javier Aquino; 8 – Carlos Orrantía; 9 – Oribe Peralta; 10 – Othoniel Arce; 11 – Jerónimo Amione; 12 – José Antonio Rodríguez; 13 – Ricardo Bocanegra; 14 – Jorge Enríquez; 15 – César Ibáñez; 16 – Miguel Ángel Ponce; 17 – Isaác Brizuela; 18 – Diego Reyes (HC – Luis Fernando Tena)	Argentina 1 – Esteban Andrada; 2 – Germán Pezzella; 3 – Lucas Kruspzky; 4 – Hugo Nervo; 5 – Ezequiel Cirigliano; 6 – Leandro González; 7 – Matías Laba; 8 – Leonardo Ferreyra; 9 – Carlos Luque; 10 – Michael Hoyos; 11 – Sergio Araujo; 12 – Rodrigo Rey; 13 – David Achucarro; 14 – Franco Fragapane; 15 – Lucas Villafañez; 16 – Adrián Martínez; 17 – Fernando Coniglio; 18 – Alan Ruiz (HC – Walter Perazzo)	Uruguay 1 – Jonathan Cubero; 2 – Guillermo de los Santos; 3 – Gastón Silva; 4 – Adrián Gunino; 5 – Facundo Píriz; 6 – Mauricio Prieto; 7 – Leonardo Pais; 8 – Gonzalo Papa; 9 – Federico Puppo; 10 – Tabaré Viudez; 11 – Maximiliano Rodríguez; 12 – Sebastián Rodríguez; 13 – Santiago Silva; 14 – Emiliano Albín; 15 – Diego Rodríguez; 16 – Mathías Abero; 17 – Gianni Rodríguez; 18 – Matías Britos (HC – Juan Verzeri)
2015	Uruguay 1 – Guillermo de Amores; 2 – Sebastián Gorga; 3 – Federico Ricca; 4 – Mauricio Lemos; 5 – Andrés Schetino; 6 – Fabricio Formiliano; 7 – Facundo Castro; 8 – Juan Cruz Mascia; 9 – Junior Arias; 10 – Michael Santos; 11 – Ignacio González; 12 – Gastón Olveira; 13 – Erick Cabaco; 14 – Gastón Faber; 15 – Fernando Gorriarán; 16 – Nicolás Albarracín; 17 – Mathías Suárez; 18 – Brian Lozano (HC – Fabián Coito)	Mexico 1 – Gibrán Lajud; 2 – Carlos Guzmán; 3 – Hedgardo Marín; 4 – Luis Alberto López; 5 – José Abella; 6 – José Van Rankin; 7 – Jonathan Espericueta; 8 – Uvaldo Luna; 9 – Marco Bueno; 10 – Ángel Zaldívar; 11 – Carlos Cisneros; 12 – Luis Cárdenas; 13 – Jordan Silva; 14 – Kevin Escamilla; 15 – Michael Pérez; 16 – Alfonso Tamay; 17 – Martín Eduardo Zúñiga; 18 – Daniel Álvarez (HC – Raúl Gutiérrez)	Brazil 1 – Jacsson; 2 – Gilberto; 3 – Bressan; 4 – Luan; 5 – Bruno Paulista; 6 – Vinícius Freitas; 7 – Barreto; 8 – Dodô; 9 – Erik; 10 – Lucas Piazon; 11 – Clayton; 12 – Andrey; 13 – Tinga; 14 – Gustavo Henrique; 15 – Euller; 16 – Rômulo; 17 – Eurico; 18 – Luciano (HC – Rogério Micale)
2019	Argentina 1 – Facundo Cambeses; 2 – Leonel Mosevich; 3 – Aaron Barquett; 4 – Marcelo Herrera; 5 – Fausto Vera; 6 – Joaquín Novillo; 7 – Carlos Valenzuela; 8 – Nicolás Demartini; 9 – Adolfo Gaich; 10 – Nicolás González; 11 – Santiago Colombatto; 12 – Juan Cozzani; 13 – Ignacio Aliseda; 14 – Facundo Medina; 15 – Aníbal Moreno; 16 – Agustín Urzi; 17 – Lucas Necul; 18 – Sebastián Lomonaco (HC – Fernando Batista)	Honduras 1 – Enrique Facusse; 2 – Denil Maldonado; 3 – Elvin Oliva; 4 – Elison Rivas; 5 – Cristopher Meléndez; 6 – Riky Zapata; 7 – José Reyes; 8 – Jorge Álvarez; 9 – Douglas Martínez; 10 – Rembrandt Flores; 11 – Darixon Vuelto; 12 – Aldo Fajardo; 13 – Carlos Pineda; 14 – Kilmar Peña; 15 – Kervin Arriaga; 16 – José García; 17 – José Pinto; 18 – Alex Güity (HC – (Uruguay) Fabián Coito)	Mexico 1 – José Hernández; 2 – Kevin Álvarez; 3 – Ismael Govea; 4 – Johan Vásquez; 5 – Aldo Cruz; 6 – Éric Cantú; 7 – Paolo Yrizar; 8 – Óscar Macías; 9 – Jesús Godínez; 10 – Diego Avello; 11 – Mauro Lainez; 12 – Luis Malagón; 13 – Ulises Cardona; 14 – Pablo López; 15 – Francisco Venegas; 16 – José Joaquín Esquivel; 17 – Marcel Ruiz; 18 – Brayton Vázquez (HC - Jaime Lozano)
2023	Brazil 1 – Mycael; 2 – Miranda; 3 – Michel; 4 – Arthur Chaves; 5 – Ronald; 6 – Patryck Lanza; 7 – Gabriel Pirani; 8 – Matheus Dias; 9 – Matheus Nascimento; 10 – Marquinhos; 11 – Guilherme Biro; 12 – Andrew; 13 – Gustavo Martins; 14 – Matheus Donelli; 15 – Igor Jesus; 16 – Thauan Lara; 17 – Kaio César; 18 – Figueiredo (HC – Ramon Menezes)	Chile 1 – Brayan Cortés; 2 – Jonathan Villagra; 3 – Bruno Gutiérrez; 4 – Daniel Gutiérrez; 5 – Matías Zaldivia; 6 – Vicente Pizarro; 7 – Maximiliano Guerrero; 8 – César Fuentes; 9 – Alexander Aravena; 10 – Lucas Assadi; 11 – Clemente Montes; 12 – Tomás Ahumada; 13 – Alfred Canales; 14 – Julián Alfaro; 15 – Antonio Díaz; 16 – Felipe Loyola; 17 – César Pérez; 18 – Damián Pizarro (HC – (Argentina) Eduardo Berizzo)	Mexico 1 – Fernando Tapia; 2 – Pablo Monroy; 3 – Emilio Lara; 4 – Rafael Fernández; 5 – Mauricio Isais; 6 – Érik Lira; 7 – Raymundo Fulgencio; 8 – Fidel Ambríz; 9 – Ettson Ayón; 10 – Jordan Carrillo; 11 – Bryan González; 12 – Eduardo García; 13 – Jesús Garza; 14 – Antonio Leone; 15 – Sebastián Pérez; 16 – Jesús Brigido; 17 – Ramiro Arciga; 18 – Ali Ávila (HC - Ricardo Cadena)

== Women's tournament ==
Games	Gold	Silver	Bronze
1999	United States	Mexico	Costa Rica
2003	Brazil Andréia; Cristiane; Elaine; Formiga; Giselle; Juliana Cabral; Karina; Kelly Cristina; Marta; Maycon; Michelle Reis; Mônica; Rafaela; Renata Costa; Renata Diniz; Rosana; Tânia Maranhão; Tatiana Torres (HC – Paulo Gonçalves)	Canada	Mexico
2007	Brazil Aline; Andréia; Bagé; Bárbara; Cristiane; Daniela Alves; Elaine; Ester; Formiga; Grazi; Kátia Cilene; Marta; Maycon; Pretinha; Renata Costa; Rosana; Simone Jatobá; Tânia Maranhão (HC – Jorge Luiz Barcellos)	United States; Alyssa Naeher; Brittany Taylor; Nikki Washington; Kaley Fountain; Teresa Noyola; Nikki Marshall; Casey Nogueira; Lauren Cheney; Jessica McDonald; Michelle Enyeart; Tobin Heath; Kylie Wright; Lauren Barnes; Gina DiMartino; Becky Edwards; Lauren Wilmoth; Kelley O'Hara; Chantel Jones	Canada; Karina LeBlanc; Kristina Kiss; Melanie Booth; Melissa Tancredi; Andrea Neil; Sasha Andrews; Rhian Wilkinson; Diana Matheson; Candace Chapman; Martina Franko; Randee Hermus; Christine Sinclair; Amy Walsh; Kara Lang; Katie Thorlakson; Brittany Timko; Amy Vermeulen; Taryn Swiatek
2011	Canada; Rachelle Beanlands; Melanie Booth; Candace Chapman; Robyn Gayle; Christina Julien; Kaylyn Kyle; Karina LeBlanc; Vanessa Legault-Cordisco; Diana Matheson; Kelly Parker; Sophie Schmidt; Desiree Scott; Lauren Sesselmann; Diamond Simpson; Christine Sinclair; Brittany Timko; Rhian Wilkinson; Shannon Woeller	Brazil Bagé; Bárbara; Bia Zaneratto; Daniele; Debinha; Formiga; Francielle; Grazi; Karen Rocha; Ketlen; Maurine; Maycon; Renata Costa; Renata Diniz; Rosana; Tânia Maranhão; Thaís Picarte; Thaisinha (HC – Kleiton Lima)	Mexico; Cecilia Santiago; Erika Vanegas; Kenti Robles; Rubí Sandoval; Jennifer Ruiz; Valeria Miranda; Mónica Vergara; Marylin Díaz; Luz del Rosario Saucedo; Stephany Mayor; Guadalupe Worbis; Dinora Garza; Liliana Mercado; Liliana Godoy; Verónica Pérez; Maribel Domínguez; Mónica Ocampo; Tanya Samarzich
2015	Brazil 1 – Luciana; 2 – Fabiana; 3 – Monica; 4 – Rafaelle; 5 – Thaisa; 6 – Tamires; 7 – Maurine; 8 – Formiga; 9 – Andressa Alves; 10 – Andressa Machry; 11 – Cristiane; 12 – Bárbara; 13 – Poliana; 14 – Érika; 15 – Gabi Zanotti; 16 – Darlene; 17 – Raquel; 18 – Géssica (HC – Vadão)	Colombia; Paula Forero; Sandra Sepúlveda; Stefany Castaño; Isabella Echeverri; Natalia Gaitán; Diana Ospina; Daniela Montoya; Ingrid Vidal; Mildrey Pineda; Oriánica Velásquez; Catalina Usme; Ángela Clavijo; Nataly Arias; Tatiana Ariza; Carolina Arias; Leicy Santos	Mexico; Cecilia Santiago; Pamela Tajonar; Kenti Robles; Christina Murillo; Greta Espinoza; Valeria Miranda; Jennifer Ruiz; Nayeli Rangel; Teresa Noyola; Nancy Antonio; Stephany Mayor; Mónica Ocampo; Bianca Sierra; Arianna Romero; Mónica Alvarado; Fabiola Ibarra; Verónica Pérez; Maria Sanchez
2019	Colombia; Catalina Pérez; Manuela Vanegas; Natalia Gaitán; Diana Ospina; Isabella Echeverri; Daniela Montoya; Marcela Restrepo; Jessica Caro; Oriánica Velásquez; Leicy Santos; Catalina Usme; Stefany Castaño; Michell Lugo; Daniela Arias; Daniela Caracas; Lady Andrade; Carolina Arias; Mayra Ramírez	Argentina; Vanina Correa; Agustina Barroso; Eliana Stábile; Adriana Sachs; Vanesa Santana; Aldana Cometti; Yael Oviedo; Micaela Cabrera; Milagros Menéndez; Dalila Ippólito; Mariana Larroquette; Solana Pereyra; Virginia Gómez; Miriam Mayorga; Yamila Rodríguez; Natalie Juncos; Mariela Coronel; Gabriela Chávez	Costa Rica; Noelia Bermúdez; Gabriela Guillén; María Paula Elizondo; Mariana Benavides; Fabiola Sánchez; Carol Sánchez; Valeria del Campo; Daniela Cruz; Gloriana Villalobos; Shirley Cruz; Raquel Rodríguez; Lixy Rodríguez; Sofía Varela; Priscila Chinchilla; Stephannie Blanco; Katherine Alvarado; María Paula Salas; Priscilla Tapia
2023	Mexico Esthefanny Barreras; Rebeca Bernal; Scarlett Camberos; Alicia Cervantes; Charlyn Corral; Alexia Delgado; Greta Espinoza; Alejandría Godínez; Nicolette Hernández; Karla Nieto; Diana Ordóñez; Jacqueline Ovalle; Kiana Palacios; Anika Rodríguez; Karina Rodríguez; Kimberly Rodríguez; María Sánchez; Araceli Torres; HC: Pedro López	Chile Yenny Acuña; Yanara Aedo; Anaís Alvarez; Karen Araya; Antonia Canales; Franchesca Caniguán; Christiane Endler; Karen Fuentes; Su Helen Galaz; Yastin Jiménez; Yessenia López; Michelle Olivares; Isidora Olave; Fernanda Pinilla; Fernanda Ramírez; Camila Sáez; María José Urrutia; Daniela Zamora; HC: Luis Mena	United States Emeri Adames; Aven Alvarez; Kendall Bodak; Jordyn Bugg; Katie Shea Collins; Nicki Fraser; Claire Hutton; Sonoma Kasica; Reese Klein; Eleanor Klinger; Charlotte Kohler; Lauren Martinho; Ava McDonald; Grace Restovich; Sam Smith; Gisele Thompson; Kealey Titmuss; Amalia Villarreal; HC: Carrie Kveton
