= Football at the 1959 Pan American Games – Men's team squads =

The football tournament at the 1959 Pan American Games was an international football tournament in Mexico from 28 August to 6 September 1959. The age listed for each player is on 28 August, the first day of the tournament. The numbers of caps and goals listed for each player do not include any matches played after the start of the tournament. The club listed is the club for which the player last played a competitive match before the tournament. The nationality for each club reflects the national association (not the league) to which the club is affiliated. A flag is included for coaches who are of a different nationality than their own national team.:

== Argentina ==
Head Coach: Guillermo Stábile

No.	Pos.	Player	Date of birth (age)	Caps	Goals	Club
	GK	Carlos Saldías	25 February 1939 (aged 20)			(Argentine Football Association) Sacachispas
	GK	Antonino Spilinga	21 June 1940 (aged 19)			(Argentine Football Association) Argentinos Juniors
	DF	Roberto Blanco	26 November 1938 (aged 20)			(Argentine Football Association) Racing Club
	DF	Héctor Readigós	15 July 1938 (aged 21)			(Argentine Football Association) Chacarita Juniors
	DF	José Vazquez	7 December 1940 (aged 18)			(Argentine Football Association) Chacarita Juniors
	DF	Miguel Ángel Villafañe	21 September 1945 (aged 13)			(Argentine Football Association) Atlanta
	MF	José Díaz	20 April 1938 (aged 21)			(Argentine Football Association) Lanús
	MF	Pedro de Ciancio	16 February 1938 (aged 21)			(Argentine Football Association) Racing Club
	MF	Domingo Lejona	2 February 1938 (aged 21)			(Argentine Football Association) Gimnasia LP
	MF	Miguel Ángel Basílico	16 June 1940 (aged 19)			(Argentine Football Association) Boca Juniors
	MF	Héctor Scardulla	23 April 1938 (aged 21)			(Argentine Football Association) Racing Club
	FW	Roberto Bonnano	16 March 1938 (aged 21)			(Argentine Football Association) Vélez Sarsfield
	FW	Juan Carlos Oleniak	4 March 1942 (aged 17)			(Argentine Football Association) Racing Club
	FW	Osmar Stelman	15 March 1940 (aged 19)			(Argentine Football Association) Gimnasia LP
	FW	Raúl Adolfo Pérez	11 November 1939 (aged 19)			(Argentine Football Association) Boca Juniors
	FW	Juan Raúl Stork	18 April 1935 (aged 24)			(Argentine Football Association) Estudiantes de La Plata
	FW	Dardo Migoni	5 September 1938 (aged 20)			(Argentine Football Association) Boca Juniors
	FW	Domingo Rodríguez	21 March 1939 (aged 20)			(Argentine Football Association) River Plate
	FW	Alberto Corradini	25 October 1938 (aged 20)			(Argentine Football Association) Ferro Carril Oeste

== Brazil ==
Head coach: Newton Cardoso

No.	Pos.	Player	Date of birth (age)	Caps	Goals	Club
	GK	Edmar	30 January 1941 (aged 18)			(Brazilian Football Confederation) Flamengo
	GK	Edson Borracha	21 October 1941 (aged 17)			(Brazilian Football Confederation) Fluminense
	GK	Carlos Alberto	25 January 1932 (aged 27)			(Brazilian Football Confederation) Portuguesa
	DF	Edílson	31 July 1941 (aged 18)			(Brazilian Football Confederation) Vasco da Gama
	DF	Décio	28 December 1941 (aged 17)			(Brazilian Football Confederation) América (MG)
	DF	Dary	28 December 1940 (aged 18)			(Brazilian Football Confederation) Fluminense
	DF	Nélson Purchio	26 June 1941 (aged 18)			(Brazilian Football Confederation) Fluminense
	DF	Hércules	25 March 1940 (aged 19)			(Brazilian Football Confederation) Fluminense
	DF	Hilton (Note: Player would ultimately not travel with the team.)	25 March 1940 (aged 19)			(Brazilian Football Confederation) Flamengo
	DF	Ouraci	8 March 1941 (aged 18)			(Brazilian Football Confederation) Flamengo
	MF	Germano	25 March 1942 (aged 17)			(Brazilian Football Confederation) Flamengo
	MF	Maranhão	30 June 1942 (aged 17)			(Brazilian Football Confederation) Vasco da Gama
	MF	Rubens	19 June 1941 (aged 18)			(Brazilian Football Confederation) Fluminense
	MF	Roberto Rodrigues	12 March 1939 (aged 20)			(Brazilian Football Confederation) Flamengo
	FW	Elson Beiruth	20 October 1941 (aged 17)			(Brazilian Football Confederation) Flamengo
	FW	Gérson	11 January 1941 (aged 18)			(Brazilian Football Confederation) Flamengo
	FW	China	11 September 1939 (aged 19)			(Brazilian Football Confederation) Botafogo
	FW	Françoso	12 March 1941 (aged 18)			(Brazilian Football Confederation) Fluminense
	FW	Viladônega	7 June 1942 (aged 17)			(Brazilian Football Confederation) Vasco da Gama
	FW	Manuel	5 February 1941 (aged 18)			(Brazilian Football Confederation) Fluminense
	FW	Humberto	10 June 1939 (aged 20)			(Brazilian Football Confederation) Flamengo
	FW	Zé Maria	27 August 1942 (aged 17)			(Brazilian Football Confederation) Bangu
	FW	Manoelzinho	25 January 1940 (aged 19)			(Brazilian Football Confederation) Flamengo

== Costa Rica ==
Head coach: Rogelio Rojas

No.	Pos.	Player	Date of birth (age)	Caps	Goals	Club
	GK	Carlos Manuel Ramos				(Costa Rican Football Federation) Ramonense
	GK	Alexis Rivera				(Costa Rican Football Federation) La Libertad
	GK	Héctor Navarro				(Costa Rican Football Federation) Moravia
	DF	Javier Francisco Bolaños				(Costa Rican Football Federation) Nicolás Marín
	DF	Eduardo Valverde				(Costa Rican Football Federation) Ramonense
	DF	Antonio Mora Rivero				(Costa Rican Football Federation) Nicolás Marín
	DF	Orlando Quirós				(Costa Rican Football Federation) Moravia
	DF	Rodolfo Monge				(Costa Rican Football Federation) Moravia
	MF	Víctor Vargas Montero				(Costa Rican Football Federation) La Libertad
	MF	Álvaro Alfaro				(Costa Rican Football Federation) Nicolás Marín
	MF	Rafael Artavia				(Costa Rican Football Federation) Nicolás Marín
	FW	Guillermo Otárola	22 February 1941 (aged 18)			(Costa Rican Football Federation) Moravia
	FW	Juan José Gámez	8 July 1939 (aged 20)			(Costa Rican Football Federation) Alajuelense
	FW	Guillermo Acuña				(Costa Rican Football Federation) Nicolás Marín
	FW	Oldemar Bolaños				(Costa Rican Football Federation) Tibás
	FW	Rodrigo Tenorio				(Costa Rican Football Federation) Valencia
	FW	Miguel Ángel Herrera				(Costa Rican Football Federation) Nicolás Marín
	FW	Jorge Loria				(Costa Rican Football Federation) Madrid
	FW	Marciano Sánchez				(Costa Rican Football Federation) Nicolás Marín
	FW	Rogelio Rojas				(Costa Rican Football Federation) No club

== Cuba ==
Head coach: José Antonio Cuervo

No.	Pos.	Player	Date of birth (age)	Caps	Goals	Club
	GK	Julio Blanco	18 September 1937 (aged 21)			(Football Association of Cuba) Deportivo Mordazo
	GK	José Suco				(Football Association of Cuba) Atlético La Habana
	DF	Mario "Pilillo" Herrera				(Football Association of Cuba) San Francisco
	DF	Antonio Puebla				(Football Association of Cuba) Juventud Asturiana
	MF	Juvenal Reyes				(Football Association of Cuba) Juventud Asturiana
	DF	Raúl Sarabia				(Football Association of Cuba) Puentes Grandes
	MF	Ramón Peñalver	31 August 1935 (aged 23)	4	0	(Football Association of Cuba) Deportivo Mordazo
	FW	Vicente "Vicentico" Pérez				(Football Association of Cuba) El Cerro
	MF	Antonio Fernández Riverón				(Football Association of Cuba) El Cerro
	MF	Jacinto Oña				(Football Association of Cuba) San Francisco
	FW	Ángel Piedra		8	0	(Football Association of Cuba) Deportivo Mordazo
	FW	Manuel Marco Bobadilla				(Football Association of Cuba) Deportivo Mordazo
	FW	José Doce		0	0	(Football Association of Cuba) Atlético La Habana
	FW	José Ramón González				(Football Association of Cuba) Atlético La Habana
	FW	Ángel Bacallao				(Football Association of Cuba) Deportivo Mordazo
	FW	Ramón Álvarez				(Football Association of Cuba) Juventud Asturiana
	FW	Luis Piedra				(Football Association of Cuba) Deportivo Mordazo

== Haiti ==
Head coach: José Antonio Cuervo

No.	Pos.	Player	Date of birth (age)	Caps	Goals	Club
	GK	Michel Blain				(Haitian Football Federation) Aigle Noir
	GK	René Vertus				(Haitian Football Federation) Racing Haïtien
	MF	Michel Morin				(Haitian Football Federation) Victory
	DF	Claudel Legros	23 May 1935 (aged 24)			(Haitian Football Federation) Victory
	DF	Jean Germilus Cadet				(Haitian Football Federation) Violette
	DF	Eric Faublas				(Haitian Football Federation) Victory
	DF	Joseph Beaulier				(Haitian Football Federation) Violette
	DF	Elie LeBlanc				(Haitian Football Federation) Victory
	MF	Roland Crispin	22 March 1939 (aged 20)			(Haitian Football Federation) Etoile Haïtienne
	MF	Fritz Tabuteau				(Haitian Football Federation) Victory
	MF	Gérard Elie				(Haitian Football Federation) Violette
	MF	Emmanuel Joseph				(Haitian Football Federation) Racing Haïtien
	FW	Georges Chardin Délices	4 March 1940 (aged 19)			(Haitian Football Federation) Aigle Noir
	FW	Germain Champagne				(Haitian Football Federation) Racing Haïtien
	FW	Gérard Delpeche				(Haitian Football Federation) Violette
	FW	Paul Desrosiers				(Haitian Football Federation) Aigle Noir
	FW	Antoine Tassy	26 March 1924 (aged 35)			(Haitian Football Federation) Racing Haïtien
	FW	Phenol Charles				(Haitian Football Federation) Aigle Noir
	FW	Lucien Pierre				(Haitian Football Federation) Victory
	FW	André Wilson				(Haitian Football Federation) Aigle Noir
	FW	Pierre Roc				(Haitian Football Federation) Racing Haïtien

== Mexico ==
Head coach: (Spain) Antonio Álvarez Fuertes

No.	Pos.	Player	Date of birth (age)	Caps	Goals	Club
	GK	Antonio Mota	26 January 1939 (aged 20)			(Mexican Football Federation) Oro
	GK	Jorge García Zepeda	3 December 1937 (aged 21)			(Mexican Football Federation) León
	DF	Jesús Mercado	2 April 1939 (aged 20)			(Mexican Football Federation) Guadalajara
	DF	Eduardo Carranza Soto	18 March 1939 (aged 20)			(Mexican Football Federation) León
	DF	Fernando Cuenca	7 April 1939 (aged 23)			(Mexican Football Federation) América
	DF	Eduardo Silva Espinoza	4 April 1937 (aged 22)			(Mexican Football Federation) Guadalajara
	DF	Jesús Cabriales	31 October 1936 (aged 22)			(Mexican Football Federation) Tampico
	DF	Carlos Ruiz Cavazos	16 June 1940 (aged 19)			(Mexican Football Federation) Tampico
	MF	Francisco Valle	28 November 1937 (aged 21)			(Mexican Football Federation) Guadalajara
	MF	Fernando Meza Medina	3 September 1940 (aged 18)			(Mexican Football Federation) Oro
	MF	Mario Velarde	29 March 1940 (aged 19)			(Mexican Football Federation) Necaxa
	MF	Miguel Ángel Sordo	3 September 1940 (aged 18)			(Mexican Football Federation) Deportivo Montañesa
	MF	Gustavo Cuenca	3 September 1940 (aged 18)			(Mexican Football Federation) América
	MF	Joaquín Fierro	20 June 1930 (aged 29)			(Mexican Football Federation) Galicia
	MF	David Echevarría	25 March 1935 (aged 24)			(Mexican Football Federation) Tampico
	FW	Raúl Sánchez Bahena	1 August 1940 (aged 19)			(Mexican Football Federation) Tampico
	FW	Jorge Díez	27 April 1937 (aged 22)			Free agent
	FW	José Manuel Arias	12 August 1938 (aged 21)			(Mexican Football Federation) Covadonga
	FW	Juan Álvarez	10 September 1941 (aged 17)			(Mexican Football Federation) Atlante

== United States ==
Head coach: James Reed

No.	Pos.	Player	Date of birth (age)	Caps	Goals	Club
	GK	Victor Ottoboni	5 April 1934 (aged 25)			(United States Soccer Federation) San Francisco Vikings
	GK	Yurily Kulishenko	27 November 1930 (aged 28)			(United States Soccer Federation) Philadelphia Ukrainians
	DF	Herman Wecke	10 March 1927 (aged 32)			(United States Soccer Federation) St. Louis Kutis
	DF	Joe Speca	1 July 1937 (aged 22)			(United States Soccer Federation) Baltimore Pompei
	DF	Willy Schaller	23 February 1933 (aged 26)			(United States Soccer Federation) Blau-Weiss Gottschee
	DF	Jacob Ruscheinski				(United States Soccer Federation) Chicago Ukrainian Lions
	MF	Zenon Snylyk	14 November 1933 (aged 25)			(United States Soccer Federation) New York Ukrainians
	MF	Alex Ely	9 February 1938 (aged 21)			(United States Soccer Federation) Philadelphia Ukrainians
	MF	Val Pelizzaro	11 July 1931 (aged 28)			(United States Soccer Federation) St. Louis Kutis
	MF	Val Pelizzaro	2 January 1932 (aged 27)			(United States Soccer Federation) St. Louis Kutis
	MF	Bill Looby	20 November 1931 (aged 27)			(United States Soccer Federation) St. Louis Kutis
	FW	Ed Murphy	6 November 1930 (aged 28)			(United States Soccer Federation) Chicago Slovak
	FW	Al Zerhusen	4 December 1931 (aged 27)			(United States Soccer Federation) Los Angeles Kickers
	FW	George Brown	19 August 1935 (aged 24)			(United States Soccer Federation) Chicago Red Lions
	FW	Rolf Ganger	19 August 1931 (aged 28)			(United States Soccer Federation) Los Angeles Kickers
	FW	Ron Maierhofer	1935 (aged 23–24)			(United States Soccer Federation) Cornell Big Red
	FW	Gene Grabowski	31 July 1935 (aged 24)			(United States Soccer Federation) New York Hakoah
	FW	Jim Strachrowsky				(United States Soccer Federation) Chicago Ukrainian Lions
