= Brazil at the 1959 Pan American Games =

- IOC code: BRA
- NOC: Brazilian Olympic Committee
- Website: www.cob.org.br

in Chicago August 28 - September 7, 1959
- Competitors: 219 in 18 sports
- Medals Ranked 3rd: Gold 8 Silver 8 Bronze 6 Total 22

Pan American Games appearances (overview)
- 1951; 1955; 1959; 1963; 1967; 1971; 1975; 1979; 1983; 1987; 1991; 1995; 1999; 2003; 2007; 2011; 2015; 2019; 2023; 2027

Brazil competed at the 3rd Pan American Games held in Chicago, Illinois, United States from August 28 to September 7, 1959.

== Medals ==
Medal	Name(s)	Sport	Event	Date	Ref
Silver	Wanda dos Santos	Athletics	Women's 80m hurdles	31 August 1959	
Gold	Adhemar Ferreira da Silva	Athletics	Men's triple jump	2 September 1959	
Silver	Men's football team: Françoso Dary Décio Edílson Edmar Edson Borracha Beyruth Gérson Hércules Hilton Humberto Germano Zé Maria Maranhão China Carlos Alberto Manuel Manoelzinho Nélson Ouraci Roberto Rodrigues Rubens Villadonega	Football	Men's tournament	5 September 1959	
Bronze	Men's basketball team: Carlos Barone Neto Carlos Domingo Massoni Carmo de Souza Edson Bispo Fernando Pereira de Freitas Jatyr Eduardo Schall Pedro Vicente Fonseca Wlamir Marques Waldemar Blatskauskas Wilson Bombarda Waldir Geraldo Boccardo Zenny de Azevedo	Basketball	Men's tournament		
Silver	Women's basketball team: Angelina Bizarro Genesia Isabel Cardoso Isaura Marli Alvares Maria Helena Campos Maria Helena Cardoso Marlene José Bento Marta Helga Kampmann Zilá Nepomuceno Nadir Bazani Zilda Ulbrich Nair Kanawatti Neuci Ramos da Silva	Basketball	Women's tournament		
Silver	José Martins	Boxing	Men's flyweight (-51 kg)		
Gold	Waldomiro Claudiano Pinto	Boxing	Men's bantamweight (-54 kg)		
Bronze	Manuel Alves	Boxing	Men's welterweight (-67 kg)		
Bronze	Hélio Crescêncio	Boxing	Men's light middleweight (-71 kg)		
Gold	Abrão de Souza	Boxing	Men's middleweight (-75 kg)		
Bronze	Jurandyr Nicolau	Boxing	Men's heavyweight (+81 kg)		
Gold	Anésio Argenton	Cycling	Men's 1000m time trial (track)		
Silver	Antonio Moraes Carvalho; Francisco Rabelo; Renyldo Ferreira; Nelson Pessoa Filho	Equestrian	Team Jumping		
Gold	Wenceslau Malta	Modern pentathlon	Men's individual		
Silver	Breno Vignolli; José Wilson Pereira; Justo Botelho Santiago; Wenceslau Malta	Modern pentathlon	Men's team		
Silver	Edgard Gijsen; Milton Meurer	Rowing	Men's coxless pair-oared shells		
Bronze	Adriano Monteiro Soares; João Agostinho Almeida; João Calixto; Jorge Rodrigues; Nelson Guarda	Rowing	Men's coxed four-oared shells		
Gold	Marcos Moraes de Barros; Reinaldo Conrad	Sailing	Snipe class		
Gold	Antonio Barbosa; Axel Schmidt; Erik Oluf Schmidt	Sailing	Lightning class		
Silver	Men's volleyball team: Alexandre Stubart Álvaro Caira Arlindo Lopes Corrêa Atila Gonçalves Martins Décio de Azevedo João Carlos Quaresma João Ramalho Júnior José Silvério Lage Luís Eduardo Pons Roque Midley Maron Sérgio Bóris Borges Urbano Santiago	Volleyball	Men's tournament		
Gold	Women's volleyball team: Hildergarde Lassen Ingeborg Crause Irlana Silveira Sá Lia de Freitas Lilian Hilda Poetscher Lucia Mendes de Moraes Maria Alice Ricciardi Marina Conceição Calistre Marta Maraglia Norma Rosa Vaz Rosa Bastos O'Shea Vera Trezoitko	Volleyball	Women's tournament		
Bronze	Men's water polo team: Adhemar Grijó Filho Everardo Cruz Flávio Ratto Hilton de Almeida João Gonçalves Filho Luiz Daniel Márvio dos Santos Paulo Bruzzi Cochrane Rodney Bell Sylvio Kelly dos Santos	Water polo	Men's tournament		

Medals by sport
Sport	1st place, gold medalist(s)	2nd place, silver medalist(s)	3rd place, bronze medalist(s)	Total
Boxing	2	1	3	6
Sailing	2	0	0	2
Athletics	1	1	0	2
Modern Pentathlon	1	1	0	2
Volleyball	1	1	0	2
Cycling	1	0	0	1
Basketball	0	1	1	2
Rowing	0	1	1	2
Football	0	1	0	1
Equestrian	0	1	0	1
Waterpolo	0	0	1	1
Total	8	8	6	22

== See also ==
- Brazil at the 1960 Summer Olympics
- List of Pan American medalists for Brazil
