= Men's Pan American Games football tournament records and statistics =

This is a list of records and statistics of the football men's tournament in the Pan American Games ever since the inaugural official edition in 1951.

== Medal table ==
| Rank | Nation | Gold | Silver | Bronze | Total |
|---|---|---|---|---|---|
| 1 | Argentina | 7 | 2 | 3 | 12 |
| 2 | Brazil | 5 | 3 | 1 | 9 |
| 3 | Mexico | 4 | 4 | 4 | 12 |
| 4 | Uruguay | 2 | 0 | 1 | 3 |
| 5 | United States | 1 | 0 | 2 | 3 |
| 6 | Ecuador | 1 | 0 | 0 | 1 |
| 7 | Chile | 0 | 2 | 2 | 4 |
| 8 | Honduras | 0 | 2 | 0 | 2 |
| 9 | Cuba | 0 | 1 | 2 | 3 |
| 10 | Colombia | 0 | 1 | 1 | 2 |
| 11 | Bermuda | 0 | 1 | 0 | 1 |
| 11 | Costa Rica | 0 | 1 | 0 | 1 |
| 11 | Jamaica | 0 | 1 | 0 | 1 |
| 14 | Guatemala | 0 | 0 | 1 | 1 |
| 14 | Netherlands Antilles | 0 | 0 | 1 | 1 |
| 14 | Trinidad and Tobago | 0 | 0 | 1 | 1 |
| Totals (16 entries) | | 20 | 18 | 19 | 57 |

- 1975 Gold medal shared between Brazil and Mexico

== Participating nations ==
=== Team variants ===
- 1951–1983: National amateur teams
- 1987–1995: Senior teams (Caribbean), U23 teams (Conmebol, North America)
- 1999–2003: National U23 teams (Conmebol nations played the 2003 edition with U20 teams)
- 2007: National U20 teams (Conmebol nations played with U17 teams), with three overage players
- 2011–present: National U22 teams, with three overage players

| Nation | 1951 | 1955 | 1959 | 1963 | 1967 | 1971 | 1975 | 1979 | 1983 | 1987 | 1991 | 1995 | 1999 | 2003 | 2007 | 2011 | 2015 | 2019 | 2023 | Years |
|---|---|---|---|---|---|---|---|---|---|---|---|---|---|---|---|---|---|---|---|---|
| Argentina | 1st place, gold medalist(s) | 1st place, gold medalist(s) | 1st place, gold medalist(s) | 2nd place, silver medalist(s) | 5 | 1st place, gold medalist(s) | 3rd place, bronze medalist(s) | 3rd place, bronze medalist(s) | 9 | 3rd place, bronze medalist(s) | | 1st place, gold medalist(s) | | 1st place, gold medalist(s) | 9 | 2nd place, silver medalist(s) | | 1st place, gold medalist(s) | | 15 |
| Bahamas | | | | | | 9 | | | | | | | | | | | | | | 1 |
| Bermuda | | | | | 2nd place, silver medalist(s) | 10 | | 8 | 8 | | | 11 | | | | | | | | 5 |
| Bolivia | | | | | | | 6 | | | | | | | | 4 | | | | | 2 |
| Brazil | | | 2nd place, silver medalist(s) | 1st place, gold medalist(s) | | | 1st place, gold medalist(s) | 1st place, gold medalist(s) | 2nd place, silver medalist(s) | 1st place, gold medalist(s) | | 5 | | 2nd place, silver medalist(s) | 5 | 6 | 3rd place, bronze medalist(s) | | 1st place, gold medalist(s) | 12 |
| Canada | | | | | 4 | 5 | 7 | | | 11 | 7 | | 4 | | | | 7 | | | 7 |
| Chile | 3rd place, bronze medalist(s) | | | 3rd place, bronze medalist(s) | | | | | 4 | 2nd place, silver medalist(s) | | 8 | | | | | | | 2nd place, silver medalist(s) | 6 |
| Colombia | | | | | 8 | 2nd place, silver medalist(s) | | | | 10 | | 3rd place, bronze medalist(s) | | 4 | 6 | | | | 6 | 7 |
| Costa Rica | 2nd place, silver medalist(s) | | 5 | | | | 4 | 4 | | | | 6 | 6 | | 10 | 4 | | | | 8 |
| Cuba | | | 7 | | 7 | 3rd place, bronze medalist(s) | 5 | 2nd place, silver medalist(s) | 7 | 8 | 3rd place, bronze medalist(s) | | 8 | 6 | | 8 | | | | 11 |
| Dominican Republic | | | | | | 12 | | 9 | | | | | | 8 | | | | | 8 | 4 |
| Ecuador | | | | | | | | | | | | 9 | | | 1st place, gold medalist(s) | 7 | | 8 | | 4 |
| El Salvador | | | | | | | 9 | | | 7 | | | | | | | | | | 2 |
| Guatemala | | | | | | | | 7 | 3rd place, bronze medalist(s) | 5 | | | 7 | 7 | | | | | | 5 |
| Haiti | | | 4 | | | 8 | | | | | 5 | | | | 11 | | | | | 4 |
| Honduras | | | | | | | | | | | 4 | 4 | 2nd place, silver medalist(s) | | 7 | | | 2nd place, silver medalist(s) | 7 | 6 |
| Jamaica | | | | | | 11 | 12 | | | | | | 5 | | 2nd place, silver medalist(s) | | | 6 | | 5 |
| Mexico | | 2nd place, silver medalist(s) | 6 | | 1st place, gold medalist(s) | 7 | 1st place, gold medalist(s) | | 5 | 4 | 2nd place, silver medalist(s) | 2nd place, silver medalist(s) | 1st place, gold medalist(s) | 3rd place, bronze medalist(s) | 3rd place, bronze medalist(s) | 1st place, gold medalist(s) | 2nd place, silver medalist(s) | 3rd place, bronze medalist(s) | 3rd place, bronze medalist(s) | 16 |
| Nicaragua | | | | | | | 13 | | | | 8 | | | | | | | | | 2 |
| Netherlands Antilles | | 3rd place, bronze medalist(s) | | | | | | | | | | | | | | Split into 2 nations | | | | 1 |
| Panama | | | | | | | | | | | | | | | | | 4 | 5 | | 2 |
| Paraguay | 5 | | | | | | | | | 9 | | 7 | | 5 | | | 5 | | | 5 |
| Peru | | | | | | | | | | | | | | | | | 6 | 7 | | 2 |
| Puerto Rico | | | | | | | | 5 | | | | | | | | | | | | 1 |
| Suriname | | | | | | | | | | | 6 | | | | | | | | | 1 |
| Trinidad and Tobago | | | | | 3rd place, bronze medalist(s) | 4 | 8 | | | 12 | | 10 | 9 | | | 5 | 8 | | | 8 |
| United States | | | 3rd place, bronze medalist(s) | 5 | 6 | 6 | 11 | 6 | 10 | 6 | 1st place, gold medalist(s) | 12 | 3rd place, bronze medalist(s) | | 8 | | | | 4 | 13 |
| Uruguay | | | | 4 | | | 10 | | 1st place, gold medalist(s) | | | | 10 | | | 3rd place, bronze medalist(s) | 1st place, gold medalist(s) | 4 | 5 | 8 |
| Venezuela | 4 | 4 | | | | | | | 6 | | | | | | 12 | | | | | 4 |
| Nations | 5 | 4 | 7 | 5 | 8 | 12 | 13 | 9 | 10 | 12 | 8 | 12 | 10 | 8 | 12 | 8 | 8 | 8 | 8 | — |

== Medals by confederation ==
| Confederation | Gold | Silver | Bronze | Total |
|---|---|---|---|---|
| CONMEBOL | 15 | 8 | 8 | 31 |
| CONCACAF | 5 | 10 | 11 | 26 |

== Debut of national teams ==
| Year | Debuting teams | | |
| Year | Teams | No. | Cum. |
|---|---|---|---|
| 1951 | Argentina, Chile, Costa Rica, Paraguay, Venezuela | 5 | 5 |
| 1955 | Netherlands Antilles, Mexico | 2 | 7 |
| 1959 | Brazil, Cuba, Haiti, United States | 4 | 11 |
| 1963 | Uruguay | 1 | 12 |
| 1967 | Bermuda, Canada, Colombia Trinidad and Tobago | 4 | 16 |
| 1971 | Bahamas, Dominican Republic, Jamaica | 3 | 19 |
| 1975 | Bolivia, El Salvador, Nicaragua | 3 | 22 |
| 1979 | Guatemala, Puerto Rico | 3 | 24 |
| 1983 | None | 0 | 24 |
| 1987 | None | 0 | 24 |
| 1991 | Honduras, Suriname | 2 | 26 |
| 1995 | Ecuador | 1 | 27 |
| 1999 | None | 0 | 27 |
| 2003 | None | 0 | 27 |
| 2007 | None | 0 | 27 |
| 2011 | None | 0 | 27 |
| 2015 | Panama, Peru | 2 | 29 |
| 2019 | None | 0 | 29 |
| 2023 | None | 0 | 29 |

== Hosts ==
Results of host nations
| Year | Hosting team | Finish |
|---|---|---|
| 1951 | Argentina | Champions |
| 1955 | Mexico | Runners-up |
| 1959 | United States | Third place |
| 1963 | Brazil | Champions |
| 1967 | Canada | Fourth place |
| 1971 | Colombia | Runners-up |
| 1975 | Mexico | Champions |
| 1979 | Puerto Rico | Second round |
| 1983 | Venezuela | Group stage |
| 1987 | United States | Group stage |
| 1991 | Cuba | Third place |
| 1995 | Argentina | Champions |
| 1999 | Canada | Fourth place |
| 2003 | Dominican Republic | Group stage |
| 2007 | Brazil | Group stage |
| 2011 | Mexico | Champions |
| 2015 | Canada | Group stage |
| 2019 | Peru | Seventh place |
| 2023 | Chile | Runners-up |

== All-time table ==
As of 1951–2023

Following is the overall table of Men's football in Pan American Games. Wins before 1995 counts 2 points, after 1995 counts 3 points.

| Rank | Team | Part. | Pld | W | D | L | GF | GA | GD | Pts |
|---|---|---|---|---|---|---|---|---|---|---|
| 1 | Argentina | 15 | 73 | 51 | 15 | 7 | 170 | 51 | +119 | 133 |
| 2 | Mexico | 16 | 80 | 42 | 23 | 15 | 167 | 84 | +83 | 132 |
| 3 | Brazil | 12 | 55 | 39 | 11 | 6 | 154 | 40 | +114 | 102 |
| 4 | United States | 13 | 55 | 21 | 4 | 30 | 82 | 130 | −48 | 54 |
| 5 | Uruguay | 8 | 33 | 15 | 4 | 14 | 34 | 34 | 0 | 44 |
| 6 | Colombia | 7 | 32 | 13 | 6 | 13 | 46 | 41 | +5 | 40 |
| 7 | Costa Rica | 8 | 38 | 14 | 7 | 17 | 61 | 72 | −11 | 40 |
| 8 | Cuba | 11 | 48 | 12 | 13 | 23 | 48 | 72 | −24 | 38 |
| 9 | Chile | 6 | 25 | 11 | 9 | 5 | 41 | 27 | +14 | 37 |
| 10 | Honduras | 6 | 29 | 10 | 5 | 14 | 42 | 53 | −11 | 34 |
| 11 | Canada | 7 | 33 | 7 | 7 | 19 | 35 | 64 | −29 | 23 |
| 12 | Jamaica | 5 | 18 | 6 | 3 | 9 | 17 | 25 | −8 | 21 |
| 13 | Trinidad and Tobago | 8 | 34 | 7 | 6 | 21 | 39 | 78 | −39 | 20 |
| 14 | Ecuador | 4 | 15 | 5 | 4 | 6 | 23 | 27 | −4 | 19 |
| 15 | Paraguay | 5 | 17 | 4 | 4 | 9 | 19 | 27 | −8 | 16 |
| 16 | Guatemala | 5 | 16 | 3 | 6 | 7 | 17 | 20 | −3 | 13 |
| 17 | Haiti | 4 | 15 | 4 | 4 | 7 | 37 | 39 | −2 | 12 |
| 18 | Bolivia | 2 | 10 | 4 | 1 | 5 | 11 | 19 | −8 | 11 |
| 19 | Panama | 2 | 9 | 2 | 4 | 3 | 13 | 13 | 0 | 10 |
| 20 | Venezuela | 4 | 15 | 3 | 2 | 10 | 18 | 43 | −25 | 8 |
| 21 | Bermuda | 5 | 15 | 2 | 3 | 10 | 19 | 35 | −16 | 7 |
| 22 | El Salvador | 2 | 6 | 2 | 2 | 2 | 5 | 4 | +1 | 6 |
| 23 | Peru | 2 | 7 | 1 | 2 | 4 | 6 | 13 | −7 | 5 |
| 24 | Netherlands Antilles | 1 | 6 | 2 | 0 | 4 | 11 | 13 | −2 | 4 |
| 25 | Suriname | 1 | 3 | 1 | 1 | 1 | 4 | 3 | +1 | 3 |
| 26 | Bahamas | 1 | 3 | 1 | 0 | 2 | 4 | 13 | −9 | 2 |
| 27 | Puerto Rico | 1 | 4 | 1 | 0 | 3 | 2 | 12 | −10 | 2 |
| 28 | Dominican Republic | 4 | 12 | 0 | 2 | 10 | 5 | 38 | −33 | 2 |
| 29 | Nicaragua | 2 | 6 | 0 | 0 | 6 | 3 | 43 | −40 | 0 |

== Top scorers by tournament ==
| Year | Player | Goals |
|---|---|---|
| 1951 | (Argentina) Norberto Cupo | 5 |
| 1955 | (Argentina) José Sanfilippo | 8 |
| 1959 | (Brazil) China (United States) Al Zerhusen | 10 |
| 1963 | (Brazil) Aírton | 11 |
| 1967 | (Mexico) Vicente Pereda | 7 |
| 1971 | (Canada) Buzz Parsons (Colombia) Juan Quintero (Colombia) Carlos Monsalve | 5 |
| 1975 | (Brazil) Cláudio Adão | 10 |
| 1979 | (Brazil) Silva (Cuba) Roberto Pereira (United States) Donald Ebert | 4 |
| 1983 | (Guatemala) José Bobadilla (Uruguay) Miguel Peirano | 3 |
| 1987 | (Argentina) Oscar Dertycia | 4 |
| 1991 | (Mexico) Leopoldo Castañeda (Mexico) Antonio Noriega (United States) Steve Snow | 4 |
| 1995 | (Argentina) Marcelo Gallardo | 6 |
| 1999 | (Mexico) Jesús Mendoza | 6 |
| 2003 | (Argentina) Franco Cángele (Brazil) Vágner Love (Colombia) Edixon Perea | 4 |
| 2007 | (Jamaica) Keammar Daley (Mexico) Enrique Esqueda | 4 |
| 2011 | (Mexico) Oribe Peralta | 6 |
| 2015 | (Brazil) Luciano | 5 |
| 2019 | (Argentina) Adolfo Gaich | 6 |
| 2023 | (Brazil) Ronald (Chile) Alexander Aravena (Chile) Maximiliano Guerrero (Mexico) Jordan Carrillo (United States) Tega Ikoba | 2 |

== Winning managers ==
Following is the list with all winning managers of Men's Pan American Games football tournament. Guillermo Stabile is the only one to have won the tournament more than once, in the first two editions. The German Lothar Osiander is the only foreign winner, with USA in 1991, and Luis Fernando Tena is the only one to manage to win both the Pan American Games and the Summer Olympics.

| Year | Manager |
|---|---|
| 1951 | (Argentina) Guillermo Stábile |
| 1955 | (Argentina) Guillermo Stábile |
| 1959 | (Argentina) Ernesto Duchini |
| 1963 | (Brazil) Antoninho |
| 1967 | (Mexico) Ignacio Trelles |
| 1971 | (Argentina) Rubén Bravo |
| 1975 | (Brazil) Zizinho (Mexico) Diego Mercado |
| 1979 | (Brazil) Mário Travaglini |
| 1983 | (Uruguay) Óscar Tabárez |
| 1987 | (Brazil) Carlos Alberto Silva |
| 1991 | (Germany) Lothar Osiander |
| 1995 | (Argentina) Daniel Passarella |
| 1999 | (Mexico) José Luis Real |
| 2003 | (Argentina) Miguel Tojo |
| 2007 | (Ecuador) Sixto Vizuete |
| 2011 | (Mexico) Luis Fernando Tena |
| 2015 | (Uruguay) Fabián Coito |
| 2019 | (Argentina) Fernando Batista |
| 2023 | (Brazil) Ramon Menezes |

== Teams records ==
Most titles won
7, Argentina (1951, 1955, 1959, 1971, 1995, 2003, 2019).
Most finishes in the top three
13, Mexico (1955, 1967, 1975, 1987, 1991, 1995, 1999, 2003, 2007, 2011, 2015, 2019, 2023).
Most finishes in the top four
13, Mexico (1955, 1967, 1975, 1987, 1991, 1995, 1999, 2003, 2007, 2011, 2015, 2019, 2023).
Most appearances
16, Mexico (1955, 1959, 1967, 1971, 1975, 1983, 1987, 1991, 1995, 1999, 2003, 2007, 2011, 2015, 2019, 2023).
Most consecutive medals
9, Mexico (1991, 1995, 1999, 2003, 2007, 2011, 2015, 2019, 2023).
Most consecutive golds
3, Argentina (1951, 1955, 1959).
Most consecutive silvers
2, Mexico (1991, 1995).
Most consecutive bronzes
2, Argentina (1975, 1979), Mexico (2007, 2011), (2019, 2023).
Best finish as host team
2, Argentina (hosts 1951 and 1995, gold in both tournaments).
Most appearances without conquest the gold
11, Cuba.
Most appearances without be a medalist
5, Paraguay.
Most goals scored in a match, one team
14, Brazil vs Nicaragua, 1975.
Most goals scored in a match, both teams scored
12, Chile vs United States, 10–2, 1963.
Most matches played
80, Mexico.
Most wins
51, Argentina.
Most losses
30 United States.
Most draws
23, Mexico.
Most goals scored
170, Argentina.
Most goals conceded
130, United States.
Fewest goals conceded
3, Suriname.
Fewest goals scored
2, Puerto Rico.
Most shoot-outs played
5, Mexico (1987, 1995, 2003, 2007, 2019).
Most shoot-outs won
2, Argentina (1987, 1995); Honduras (1995, 2019).
Most shoot-outs lost
4, Mexico (1987, 1995, 2007, 2019).

== Individual records ==
Most goals scored in a match
7, Aírton (Brazil) vs United States, 1963.
Most goals scored in a tournament
11, Aírton (Brazil), 1963.
Most goals scored in a tournament without being the topscorer
9, Víctor Rangel (Mexico), 1975.
Most goals scored in a gold medal match
3, Vicente Pereda (Mexico), 1967.
Most medals conquered
2, Juan Carlos Oleniak (Argentina): 1959 ( Gold), 1963 ( Silver).
2, Roberto Telch (Argentina): 1963 ( Silver), 1971 ( Gold).
2, Jorge Massó (Cuba): 1971 ( Bronze), 1979 ( Silver).
2, José Francisco Reinoso (Cuba): 1971 ( Bronze), 1979 ( Silver).
2, Andrés Roldán (Cuba): 1971 ( Bronze), 1979 ( Silver).
2, José de Jesús Corona (Mexico): 2003 ( Bronze), 2011 ( Gold).
Players who have scored in more than one tournament
10, Ed Murphy (United States): 8 (1959), 2 (1963).
6, Juan Carlos Oleniak (Argentina): 2 (1959), 4 (1963).
4, Gastón Monterola (Venezuela): 1 (1951), 3 (1959).
3, Francisco Fariñas (Cuba): 1 (1967), 2 (1971).
3, Jorge Massó (Cuba): 2 (1971), 1 (1975).
2, Regino Delgado (Cuba): 1 (1975), 1 (1979).
2, Carlos Solano (Costa Rica): 1 (1975), 1 (1979).
2, Jorge Maya (Cuba): 1 (1979), 1 (1987).
Most clean sheets
4, Gustavo Eberto (Argentina), 2003.

== Hat-tricks ==
| Sequence | Player | No. of goals | Time of goals | Representing | Final score | Opponent | Tournament | Round | Date |
|---|---|---|---|---|---|---|---|---|---|
| 1. | Norberto Cupo | 3 | 35', 39', 85' | Argentina | 7–1 | Costa Rica | 1951 Buenos Aires | Round-robin | 1 March 1951 |
| 2. | Ernesto Saavedra | 3 | 17', 23', 46' | Chile | 4–1 | Venezuela | 1951 Buenos Aires | Round-robin | 7 March 1951 |
| 3. | José Sanfilippo | 3 | 11', 16', 23' | Argentina | 4–2 | Netherlands Antilles | 1955 Mexico City | Round-robin | 18 March 1955 |
| 4. | George Delices | 4 | 8', 12', 52', 68' | Haiti | 8–2 | Cuba | 1959 Chicago | Round-robin | 28 August 1959 |
| 5. | Al Zerhusen | 4 | ?', ?', ?', ?' | United States | 7–2 | Haiti | 1959 Chicago | Round-robin | 29 August 1959 |
| 6. | Ed Murphy | 3 | 4', 49', 64' | United States | 5–3 | Brazil | 1959 Chicago | Round-robin | 31 August 1959 |
| 7. | Jorge Diéz | 3 | 7', 46', 54' | Mexico | 6–1 | Cuba | 1959 Chicago | Round-robin | 1 September 1959 |
| 8. | China | 4 | 18', 44', 54', 63' | Brazil | 9–1 | Haiti | 1959 Chicago | Round-robin | 2 September 1959 |
| 9. | Germano | 3 | 2', 52', 64' | Brazil | 9–1 | Haiti | 1959 Chicago | Round-robin | 2 September 1959 |
| 10. | China | 3 | 20', 40', 70' | Brazil | 6–2 | Mexico | 1959 Chicago | Round-robin | 3 September 1959 |
| 11. | Gérson | 3 | 48', 52', 86' | Brazil | 6–2 | Mexico | 1959 Chicago | Round-robin | 3 September 1959 |
| 12. | Miguel Basílico | 3 | 1', 52', 82' | Argentina | 7–0 | Cuba | 1959 Chicago | Round-robin | 4 September 1959 |
| 13. | Juan Sarnari | 4 | 5', 9', 45', 55' | Argentina | 8–1 | United States | 1963 São Paulo | Round-robin | 22 April 1963 |
| 14. | Juan Carlos Oleniak | 3 | 33', 85', 87' | Argentina | 8–1 | United States | 1963 São Paulo | Round-robin | 22 April 1963 |
| 15. | Aírton | 7 | 10', 47', 57', 62', 65', 76', 87' | Brazil | 10–0 | United States | 1963 São Paulo | Round-robin | 28 April 1963 |
| 16. | Vicente Pereda | 3 | 91', 99', 106' | Mexico | 4–0 (a.e.t.) | Bermuda | 1967 Winnipeg | Gold medal match | 3 August 1967 |
| 17. | Buzz Parsons | 4 | 35', 85', 87', 90+' | Canada | 5–0 | Bahamas | 1971 Cali | First round – Group A | 5 August 1971 |
| 18. | Víctor Rangel | 4 | 5', 17', 26', 68' | Mexico | 6–1 | Trinidad and Tobago | 1975 Mexico City | First round – Group A | 13 October 1975 |
| 19. | Norberto Huezo | 3 | 60', 66', 89' | El Salvador | 4–1 | Nicaragua | 1975 Mexico City | First round – Group D | 14 October 1975 |
| 20. | Juan Silva | 3 | 21', 34', 69' | Argentina | 6–0 | Jamaica | 1975 Mexico City | First round – Group B | 15 October 1975 |
| 21. | Luiz Alberto | 4 | 1', 3', 16', 32' | Brazil | 14–0 | Nicaragua | 1975 Mexico City | First round – Group D | 17 October 1975 |
| 22. | Hugo Sánchez | 3 | 12', 48', 49' | Mexico | 8–0 | Canada | 1975 Mexico City | Second round – Group A | 19 October 1975 |
| 23. | Cláudio Adão | 4 | 37', 46', 86', 89' | Brazil | 6–0 | Bolivia | 1975 Mexico City | Second round – Group B | 19 October 1975 |
| 24. | Hugo Sánchez | 3 | 9', 22', 23' | Mexico | 7–0 | Costa Rica | 1975 Mexico City | Second round – Group A | 23 October 1975 |
| 25. | Víctor Rangel | 3 | 58', 76', 83' | Mexico | 7–0 | Costa Rica | 1975 Mexico City | Second round – Group A | 23 October 1975 |
| 26. | Cláudio Adão | 3 | 4', 40', 62' | Brazil | 6–0 | Trinidad and Tobago | 1975 Mexico City | Second round – Group B | 23 October 1975 |
| 27. | Donald Ebert | 4 | 8', 29', 49', 60' | United States | 6–0 | Dominican Republic | 1979 San Juan | First round – Group C | 2 July 1979 |
| 28. | Roberto Pereira | 3 | 60', 85', 90+' | Cuba | 5–0 | United States | 1979 San Juan | Second round – Group B | 12 July 1979 |
| 29. | Juan Hernández | 3 | 15', 38', 75' | Mexico | 7–0 | Paraguay | 1987 Indianapolis | Group stage | 12 August 1987 |
| 30. | Jean Bernard Fleurial | 3 | ?', ?', ?' | Haiti | 10–0 | Nicaragua | 1991 Havana | Group stage | 8 August 1991 |
| 31. | Jesús Mendoza | 3 | 22', 24', 38' | Mexico | 3–1 | Guatemala | 1999 Winnipeg | Group stage | 26 July 1999 |
| 32. | Edixon Perea | 4 | 4', 43', 45', 48' | Colombia | 4–1 | Dominican Republic | 2003 Santo Domingo | Group stage | 9 August 2003 |
| 33. | Lulinha | 3 | 29', 66', 90+1' | Brazil | 3–0 | Honduras | 2007 Rio de Janeiro | Group stage | 15 July 2007 |
| 34. | Oribe Peralta | 3 | 19', 38', 46' | Mexico | 3–0 | Costa Rica | 2011 Guadalajara | Semi-finals | 26 October 2011 |

== Penalty shoot-outs ==
Key

- (penalty scored) = scored penalty
- gold background = scored penalty which ended the shoot-out
- (penalty missed) = missed penalty
- pink background = missed penalty which ended the shoot-out
- silver background = first penalty in the shoot-out

Penalty shoot-outs in the Copa América
| # | Winners | F | Losers | Penalties | | | Winning team | | Losing team | | Edition | Round | Date & Venue |
| # | Winners | F | Losers | S | M | T | GK | Takers | Takers | GK | Edition | Round | Date & Venue |
|---|---|---|---|---|---|---|---|---|---|---|---|---|---|
| 1 | Argentina | 0–0 | Mexico | 5–4 | 0–1 | 5–5 | Bartero | Basualdo (penalty scored); O. Acosta (penalty scored); Fabbri (penalty scored); Fantaguzzi (penalty scored); Marchesini (penalty scored) | (penalty scored) Quirarte; (penalty scored) E. de la Torre; (penalty scored) J. M. de la Torre; (penalty scored) Muñoz; (penalty missed) Félix Cruz | Larios | 1987 Indianapolis | Bronze medal match | 20 August, Kuntz Memorial Soccer Stadium, Indianapolis |
| 2 | Honduras | 0–0 | Brazil | 8–7 | 3–4 | 11–11 | Flores | Perdomo (penalty scored); Suazo (penalty missed); Pavón (penalty scored); Lagos (penalty missed); Castro (penalty scored); Romero (penalty missed); Pineda (penalty scored); López (penalty scored); Sierra (penalty scored); Guevara (penalty scored); Flores (penalty scored) | (penalty scored) Ronaldo Guiaro; (penalty scored) Anderson; (penalty scored) Bordon; (penalty missed) Alberto; (penalty missed) Nenê; (penalty missed) Ferreira; (penalty scored) Edmílson; (penalty scored) Fabrício; (penalty scored) Silvinho; (penalty scored) Sandro; (penalty missed) Adílson | Adílson | 1995 Mar del Plata | Quarter finals | 18 March, Estadio José María Minella, Mar del Plata |
| 3 | Argentina | 0–0 | Mexico | 5–4 | 0–1 | 5–5 | Bossio | Gallardo (penalty scored); Jiménez (penalty scored); Schelotto (penalty scored); Paz (penalty scored); Bassedas (penalty scored) | (penalty scored) Hernández; (penalty scored) Villa; (penalty scored) Blanco; (penalty scored) Ayala; (penalty missed) R. García | Sánchez | 1995 Mar del Plata | Gold medal match | 21 March, Estadio José María Minella, Mar del Plata |
| 4 | Mexico | 0–0 | Colombia | 5–4 | 1–2 | 6–6 | Saucedo | Martínez (penalty scored); Cacho (penalty scored); Pérez (penalty scored); Galindo (penalty missed); Durán (penalty scored); Medina (penalty scored) | (penalty scored) Ramírez; (penalty scored) Perea; (penalty scored) Acosta; (penalty scored) González; (penalty missed) Pachón; (penalty missed) Anchico | Landázuri | 2003 Santo Domingo | Bronze medal match | 15 August, Estadio Olímpico Juan Pablo Duarte, Santo Domingo |
| 5 | Jamaica | 0–0 | Mexico | 5–4 | 2–3 | 7–7 | Kerr | Thomas (penalty scored); Woodbine (penalty missed); T. Smith (penalty scored); Cousins (penalty missed); Kerr (penalty scored); D. Smith (penalty scored); Bailey (penalty scored) | (penalty missed) C. Sánchez; (penalty scored) Esqueda; (penalty scored) Velasco; (penalty scored) Torres; (penalty missed) Cerda; (penalty scored) H. Ayala; (penalty missed) Del Real | Arias | 2007 Rio de Janeiro | Semi-finals | 24 July, Estádio do Maracanã, Rio de Janeiro |
| 6 | Peru | 1–1 | Ecuador | 4–2 | 1–2 | 5–4 | Caceda | Barco (penalty missed); Acuy (penalty scored); Arakaki (penalty scored); Pretell (penalty scored); Rivera (penalty scored) | (penalty scored) Vallecilla; (penalty missed) Alcivar; (penalty scored) Porozo; (penalty missed) Minda | Lara | 2019 Lima | Seventh place match | 7 August, Estadio Universidad San Marcos, Lima |
| 7 | Honduras | 1–1 | Mexico | 4–2 | 0–2 | 4–4 | Güity | Martínez (penalty scored); Vuelto (penalty scored); Reyes (penalty scored); Maldonado (penalty scored) | (penalty missed) Govea; (penalty scored) Vásquez; (penalty missed) López; (penalty scored) Macías | Hernández | 2019 Lima | Semi-finals | 7 August, Estadio Universidad San Marcos, Lima |
| 8 | Uruguay | 0–0 | Colombia | 4–3 | 1–2 | 5–5 | Méndez | O'Neill (penalty scored); Nandín (penalty scored); Cruz de los Santos (penalty scored); Lavega (penalty scored); Piñeiro (penalty missed) | (penalty scored) Palacios; (penalty scored) Castilla; (penalty scored) Rojas; (penalty missed) Mosquera; (penalty missed) Ruiz | Marquinez | 2023 Santiago | Fifth place match | 1 November, Estadio Elías Figueroa Brander, Valparaíso |
| 9 | Brazil | 1–1 | Chile | 4–2 | 1–2 | 5–4 | Mycael | Nascimento (penalty scored); Ronald (penalty scored); Figueiredo (penalty missed); Miranda (penalty scored); Mycael (penalty scored) | (penalty scored) Zaldivia; (penalty missed) Villagra; (penalty scored) Fuentes; (penalty missed) Montes | Cortés | 2023 Santiago | Gold medal match | 4 November, Estadio Sausalito, Viña del Mar |
