= Football at the 1959 Pan American Games =

Football – Men's tournament at the I959 Pan American Games
- Venues: Hanson Stadium; Soldier Field
- Dates: 28 August – 6 September

Medalists
Gold medal	Argentina
Silver medal	Brazil
Bronze medal	United States

Football at the 1959 Pan American Games was held in Chicago, Illinois, from August 28 to September 6, 1959. Seven teams competed in a round-robin competition with Cuba, Haiti and the hosts (United States) competing in their first Pan American Games football tournament. Argentina defended the gold medal they had won at the previous games finishing with 11 points from a possible 12 points while Brazil and the United States claimed silver and bronze respectively.

== Participants ==
- Argentina
- Brazil
- Costa Rica
- Cuba
- Haiti
- Mexico
- United States

== Final table ==
Team	Pts	Pld	W	D	L	GF	GA	GD
Argentina	11	6	5	1	0	20	4	+16
Brazil	9	6	4	1	1	27	11	+16
United States	8	6	4	0	2	25	15	+10
Haiti	6	6	3	0	3	19	20	−1
Costa Rica	5	6	2	1	3	10	16	−6
Mexico	3	6	1	1	4	13	20	−7
Cuba	0	6	0	0	6	4	32	−28

== Matches ==
28 August

Haiti	8–2	Cuba
Delices 8', 14', 52', 68'; Delpeche 49', 72' (pen.); Pierre 51'; Champagne 89'	Report	Piedra 41'; Doce 78'

Hanson Stadium, Chicago
Referee: Nils Dahlquist (United States)

28 August

United States	1–4	Argentina
Murphy 40'	Report	Basílico 12', 65'; Bonanno 44'; Oleniak 78' (pen.)

Hanson Stadium, Chicago
Attendance: 2,000
Referee: J. Edzel (Brazil)

29 August

United States	7–2	Haiti
Zerhusen; Looby; Grabowski	Report	Champagne; Delpeche (pen.)

Hanson Stadium, Chicago
Referee: Raymond Morgan (Canada)

29 August

Brazil	4–2	Costa Rica
Beyruth 25'; China 33', 78'; Rodrigues 80'	Report	Vargas 68'; Loria 70'

Hanson Stadium, Chicago
Referee: Leo Goldstein (United States)

29 August

Argentina	4–1	Mexico
Rodríguez 4', 55'; Basílico 20'; Pérez 29'	Report	Sordo 89'

Hanson Stadium, Chicago
Referee: Harry Norwich (United States)

30 August

Costa Rica	1–1	Mexico
Alfaro 40'	Report	Contreras 87'

Hanson Stadium, Chicago
Referee: Joao Etzel (Brazil)

30 August

Brazil	4–0	Cuba
Gérson 2', 4'; Rodrigues 55'; Beyruth	Report

Hanson Stadium, Chicago
Referee: Nils Dahlquist (United States)

31 August

United States	5–3	Brazil
Murphy 4', 49', 54'; Zerhusen 44', 78'	Report	Gérson 15'; Roberto 20'; Germano 62'

Hanson Stadium, Chicago
Referee: Raymond Morgan (Canada)

31 August

Argentina	1–0	Haiti
Rodríguez 7' (pen.)	Report

Hanson Stadium, Chicago
Referee: Leo Goldstein (United States)

1 September

Costa Rica	1–3	Argentina
Acuña 21'	Report	Bolaños 12' (o.g.); Migone 61'; Basilico 83'

Hanson Stadium, Chicago
Referee: Nils Dahlquist (United States)

1 September

Mexico	6–1	Cuba
Díez 7', 46', 54'; Mercado 64' (pen.); Álvarez 74'; Contreras 80'	Report	Álvarez 75'

Hanson Stadium, Chicago
Referee: Raymond Morgan (Canada)

2 September

Haiti	1–9	Brazil
Delpeche 77'	Report	Germano 2', 52', 64'; China 18', 44', 54', 63'; Roberto 57'; Maranhão 69'

Hanson Stadium, Chicago
Referee: Nils Dahlquist (United States)

2 September

United States	5–0	Cuba
Zerhusen 1', 19'; Looby 2', 50'; Murphy 48'	Report

Hanson Stadium, Chicago

3 September

Costa Rica	4–3	United States
Bolaños 10' (pen.); Speca 25' (o.g.); Herrera 39', 42'	Report	Murphy 4'; Looby 26'; Zerhusen 78'

Hanson Stadium, Chicago
Referee: Raymond Morgan (Canada)

3 September

Mexico	2–6	Brazil
Mercado 65' (pen.); Carranza 79'	Report	China 20', 40', 70'; Gérson 48', 52', 86'

Hanson Stadium, Chicago
Referee: John Best (United States)

4 September

Costa Rica	0–4	Haiti
	Report	Fenol 24'; Champagne 59'; Delpeche 67'; Pierre 76'

Hanson Stadium, Chicago
Referee: Nils Dahlquist (United States)

4 September

Cuba	0–7	Argentina
	Report	Basílico 1', 52', 82'; Bonnano 14', 38'; Stork 83'; Oleniak 66'

Hanson Stadium, Chicago
Referee: Leo Goldstein (United States)

5 September

Brazil	1–1	Argentina
China 38'	Report	Bonnano 83'

Hanson Stadium, Chicago
Referee: Raymond Morgan (Canada)

Team details

Brazil

Argentina

GK	Borracha
DF	Nelson
DF	Edilson
MF	Rubens
MF	Maranhão
MF	Dari
FW	Rodrigues
FW	Martins	(substituted off) 46'
FW	Souza
FW	China
FW	Gérson
Substitutes:
FW	Beyruth	(substituted on) 46'
Manager:
(Brazil) Newton Cardoso

GK	Carlos Saldías
DF	Domingo Lejona
DF	Ricardo Vázquez
DF	Roberto Blanco
DF	Pedro de Ciancio
MF	Héctor Scardulla
MF	Juan Raúl Stork	(substituted off) a'
MF	Roberto Bonnano
FW	Domingo Rodríguez	(substituted off) b'
FW	Miguel Ángel Basílico
FW	Raúl A. Pérez
Substitutes:
FW	Alberto Corradini	(substituted on) a'
FW	Juan Carlos Oleniak	(substituted on) b'
Manager:
(Argentina) Ernesto Duchini

5 September

United States	4–2	Mexico
Murphy 7', 87'; Looby 23'; Zerhusen 72'	Report	Meza 16'; Contreras 89'

Hanson Stadium, Chicago
Referee: Joao Etzel (Brazil)

6 September

Cuba	1–2	Costa Rica
González 15'	Report	Alfaro 49'; Gómez 83'

Hanson Stadium, Chicago
Referee: Nils Dahlquist (United States)

6 September

Mexico	1–4	Haiti
Mercado 83'	Report	Delices 13'; Champagne 17'; Delpeche 40', 75'

Hanson Stadium, Chicago
Referee: John Best (United States)

1959 Pan American Games winners

Argentina
Third title

== Medalists ==
Event	Gold	Silver	Bronze
Men's tournament	Argentina Miguel Basílico; Roberto Blanco; Roberto Bonnano; Alberto Corradini; Pedro de Ciancio; José Díaz; Domingo Lejona; Dardo Migoni; Juan Carlos Oleniak; Raúl Adolfo Pérez; Héctor Readigós; Domingo Rodríguez; Carlos Saldías; Héctor Scardulla; Antonio Spilinga; Osmar Stelman; Juan Stork; José Vázquez; Miguel Villafañe; Ernesto Duchini (HC)	Brazil Françoso; Dary; Décio; Edílson; Edmar; Edson Borracha; Beyruth; Gérson; Hércules; Hilton; Humberto; Germano; Zé Maria; Maranhão; China; Carlos Alberto; Manuel; Manoelzinho; Nélson; Ouraci; Roberto Rodrigues; Rubens; Villadonega; Newton Cardoso (HC)	United States Victor Ottoboni; Jacob Ruscheinski; Willy Schaller; Joe Speca; John Peter Traina; Herman Wecke; Alex Ely; Val Pelizzaro; Zenon Snylyk; George Brown; Rolf Ganger; Gene Grabowski; P. Kulischenko; Bill Looby; Ron Maierhofer; Ed Murphy; Jim Strachrowsky; Al Zerhusen; James Reed (HC)

== Goalscorers ==
There were 115 goals scored in 21 matches, for an average of 5.48 goals per match.

10 goals

- (Brazil) China
- (United States) Al Zerhusen

8 goals

- (United States) Ed Murphy

7 goals

- (Argentina) Miguel Basílico
- (Haiti) Gérard Delpeche

6 goals

- (Brazil) Gérson
- (United States) Bill Looby

5 goals

- (Haiti) George Delices

4 goals

- (Argentina) Roberto Bonnano
- (Brazil) Germano
- (Brazil) Roberto Rodrigues
- (Haiti) Germain Champagne

3 goals

- (Argentina) Domingo Rodríguez
- (Mexico) Javier Contreras
- (Mexico) Jorge Diéz
- (Mexico) Jesús Mercado

2 goals

- (Argentina) Juan Carlos Oleniak
- (Brazil) Beyruth
- (Costa Rica) Álvaro Alfaro
- (Costa Rica) Miguel Ángel Herrera
- (Haiti) Lucien Pierre

1 goal

- (Argentina) Dardo Migoni
- (Argentina) Raúl Adolfo Pérez
- (Argentina) Juan Raúl Stork
- (Brazil) Maranhão
- (Costa Rica) Guillermo Acuña
- (Costa Rica) Javier Bolaños
- (Costa Rica) Juan José Gámez
- (Costa Rica) Jorge Loria
- (Costa Rica) Victor Vargas
- (Cuba) Ramón Álvarez
- (Cuba) José Doce
- (Cuba) José Ramón González
- (Cuba) Ángel Piedra
- (Haiti) Charles Fenol
- (Mexico) Juan Manuel Álvarez
- (Mexico) Eduardo Carranza
- (Mexico) Fernando Meza
- (Mexico) Miguel Ángel Sordo
- (United States) Gene Grabowski

1 own goal

- (Costa Rica) Javier Bolaños (against Argentina)
- (United States) Joe Speca (against Costa Rica)

Source: RSSSF
