= Roberto Blanco (disambiguation) =

Roberto Blanco (born 1937) is a German singer and actor.

Roberto Blanco may also refer to:

- Roberto Blanco (actor) (1903–1965), Argentine stage and film actor
- Roberto Blanco (footballer) (1938–2011), Argentine footballer
