= John Traina =

American soccer player

Personal information
- Full name: John Peter Traina
- Position: Defender

Youth career
- 1948–1951: SECO Boys Club

Senior career*
| Years | Team | Apps | (Gls) |
| 1951–1955 | St. Louis Simpkins-Ford | | |
| 1955–1958 | Paterson Ford | | |
| 1958–1960 | St. Louis Kutis S.C. | | |

International career
| 1957–1961 | United States | 5 | (0) |
Medal record
Men's football (soccer)
Representing the United States
Pan American Games
| Bronze medal – third place | 1959 Chicago | Team competition |
- * Club domestic league appearances and goals

John Peter Traina is a retired American soccer player who spent most of his career playing in the St. Louis, Missouri leagues from 1950 to 1960. Traina earned five caps with the U.S. national team. He was inducted into the St Louis Hall Of fame in 1983, together with his brother Peter.

== Club career ==
During his career, Traina played either defense or defensive midfielder. Growing up in St. Louis, Missouri, Traina joined the SECO Boys Club. In 1951, SECO won the National Youth Challenge Cup, also known as the McGuire Cup. In 1951, he also signed with St. Louis Simpkins-Ford of the St. Louis Major League (SLML). The SLML folded at the end of the 1952–1953 season and Simpkins moved to the St. Louis Municipal League for the 1953–1954 season. They then moved to the newly established Khoury League for the 1955 season. Simpkins won the league title in 1955. In 1955, Traina and his teammates went to the semifinals of the National Challenge Cup. Following the National Cup, he signed with Patterson Ford where he played from 1956 to 1958. That year, he moved one last time, this time to his last club, St. Louis Kutis. In 1960, he played his last season, winning the league and National Amateur Cup titles.

== National team ==
Traina earned his first cap with the U.S. national team in a 6–0 loss to Mexico in an April 7, 1957 World Cup qualifier. He next played two years later, an 8–1 loss to England on May 28, 1959. In November 1960, he played in two World Cup qualifiers, a 3–3 tie and a 3–0 loss, both to Mexico. His last game came in a 2–0 loss to Colombia on February 5, 1961. He started, but came off for Ed Murphy.
