= Helmut Kofler =

American soccer player and coach

Helmut Kofler is a former U.S. soccer player and current coach who earned five caps with the U.S. national team in 1968.

Kofler was a product of the Blau-Weiss Gottschee Soccer Club in Queens, New York. Kofler spent much of his career in the German American Soccer League. Kofler earned his five caps with the U.S. national team in 1968. He earned his first cap on September 15, 1968, in a 3–3 tie with Israel. A month later, he played in a qualifier for the 1970 FIFA World Cup, a 4–2 loss to Canada. His last game with the national team was an October 23, 1968 loss to Haiti. Today, Kofler coaches the GH Metros of New York's Cosmopolitan Soccer League.
