= Joe Speca =

American soccer player and coach

Personal information
- Full name: Joseph Speca
- Date of birth: July 1, 1937 (age 89)
- Place of birth: Baltimore, Maryland, U.S.
- Position: Defender

College career
Years	Team	Apps	(Gls)
- Mount St. Joseph Lions

Senior career*
Years	Team	Apps	(Gls)
1957–	Baltimore Pompei		
1966–67	Baltimore St. Gerards		
1967–1968	Baltimore Bays	20	(1)

International career
1960–1968	United States	3	(0)

Managerial career
- 1967–1968: Baltimore Bays
Medal record
Men's football (soccer)
Representing the United States
Pan American Games
Bronze medal – third place	1959 Chicago	Team competition
- * Club domestic league appearances and goals

Joseph "Joey" or "Joe" Speca (born Highlandtown, Baltimore, Maryland) is a former U.S. soccer player. Speca played a single season in both the National Professional Soccer League (NPSL) and the North American Soccer League (NASL). He also earned three caps with the United States.

== Youth ==
Speca grew up in Baltimore, playing soccer first at Patterson Senior High School then the College of Mount St. Joseph.

== Professional career ==
Speca began his professional career with Baltimore Pompei. He then played for Baltimore St. Gerards, American Soccer League champions of 1966–67. In 1967, Speca signed with the Baltimore Bays of the National Professional Soccer League. He was one of only three native-born U.S. players in the league. In 1968, the NPSL merged with the United Soccer Association to form the North American Soccer League. Speca then spent the 1968 season with the Bays in the NASL.

== National team ==
In 1959, Speca was selected for the U.S. roster at the 1959 Pan American Games. In 1960, he earned his first of three caps with the U.S. national team in a 3–3 tie with Mexico in a World Cup qualifier. He did not play again for the national team until September 15, 1968, when he came on for Eddie Clear in a 3–3 tie with Israel. His last game came ten days later in a 4–0 loss to Israel. In this game, he came on for Helmut Kofler.

In 1995, Speca was inducted into the Old Timers Soccer hall of Fame. In May 2007, inducted into the Maryland Athletic Hall of Fame.
