= Roberto Bonnano =

Argentine footballer

Personal information
- Full name: Roberto Bonnano Rama
- Date of birth: 16 March 1938
- Place of birth: Buenos Aires, Argentina
- Date of death: 22 January 2012 (aged 73)
- Place of death: Buenos Aires, Argentina
- Position: Forward

Senior career*
Years	Team	Apps	(Gls)
1958–1961	Vélez Sársfield	31	(10)
1962–1963	Lanús	37	(12)
1964–1965	The Strongest	3+	(1+)
1965	Deportivo Español	24	(12)
1967	Unión San Felipe	30	(9)
1968	Santiago Wanderers	20	(9)
1969–1970	Everton	34	(10)

International career
1959	Argentina (amateur)		
1960	Argentina Olympic	3	(4)
- * Club domestic league appearances and goals

Roberto Bonnano Rama (16 March 1938 – 22 January 2012) was an Argentine footballer who competed in the 1960 Summer Olympics.

== Teams ==
- (Argentina) Vélez Sársfield 1958–1961
- (Argentina) Lanús 1962–1963
- (Bolivia) The Strongest 1964–1965
- (Argentina) Deportivo Español 1965
- (Chile) Unión San Felipe 1967
- (Chile) Santiago Wanderers 1968
- (Chile) Everton de Viña del Mar 1969–1970

== Honours ==
The Strongest

- Asociación La Paz: 1964
- Bolivian Primera División: 1964

Santiago Wanderers

- Chilean Primera División: 1968

Argentina

- Pan American Games: 1959

Argentina Olympic

- Pre-Olympic Tournament: 1960
