= Jim Reed (coach) =

American wrestling, football, and soccer player and coach

Jimmy Reed
Personal information
- Full name: James J. Reed
- Date of birth: 1903
- Place of birth: Pottsville, Pennsylvania, U.S.
- Date of death: April 1, 1994
- Place of death: United States

College career
Years	Team	Apps	(Gls)
- Lehigh Engineers

Managerial career
- 1929–1933: Princeton Tigers (wrestling assistant)
- 1931–: Princeton Tigers (football assistant)
- 1934–1964: Princeton Tigers (wrestling)
- 1938–1966: Princeton Tigers (soccer)
- 1959–1961: United States (soccer)

James J. Reed was an American wrestling, football, and soccer player and coach. He served as head coach of the United States men's national soccer team from 1959 until 1961, finishing with a record of 0–3–1.

Reed graduated from Liberty High School in Bethlehem, Pennsylvania. He attended Lehigh University in Bethlehem, Pennsylvania, from 1923 to 1927. He spent four seasons on the school's wrestling team and three on the soccer team. In 1928, he was selected as an alternate for the U.S. Olympic Wrestling Team. In 1929, he became the assistant wrestling coach at Princeton University. In September 1934, he replaced Clarence Foster as head coach, a position he held until 1963. He compiled a 109–106–14 record as wrestling coach. In 1938, Reed became the head soccer coach at Princeton. When he stepped down in 1966, he had compiled a 136–95–29 record. In 1955, the National Wrestling Coaches Association awarded Reed its 25 Years of Service Award. In the 1950s, Reed also became a part-time wrestling coach at the Hun School of Princeton. After retiring from Princeton in 1969, he became a full-time wrestling and soccer coach at the school. In 2007, the Hun School inducted Reed into its Athletic Hall of Fame.

During his life, Reed held numerous positions in various athletic associations. He was the 1938 and 1947 President of the Eastern Intercollegiate Wrestling Association. In 1942, he served as the president of the American Wrestling Coaches Association and was chairman of the NCAA Wrestling Rules Committee from 1949 to 1950. In 1952, Reed spent a year as the chairman of the NCAA Soccer Rules Committee. From 1960 to 1963, he was the secretary-treasurer of the Intercollegiate Soccer Football Association. In 1962, Reed was the president of the National Soccer Coaches Association of America. In 1971, the National Intercollegiate Soccer Officials Association inducted Reed into its Hall of Fame. In 1972, the NSCAA presented Reed with its Honor Award.

Reed also played for the Bethlehem Panthers, an early American football team.
