= Herman Wecke =

American soccer player

Personal information
- Full name: Herman William Wecke
- Date of birth: March 10, 1927
- Place of birth: St. Louis, Missouri
- Date of death: November 19, 2015 (aged 88)
- Height: 5 ft 7 in (1.70 m)
- Position: Defender

Youth career
- Schumacher Junios

Senior career*
Years	Team	Apps	(Gls)
1948–1949	Paul Schulte Motors		
1949–1950	→ McMahon Pontiac		
1950–1951	Zenthoefer Furs		
1951–1952	St. Louis Raiders		
- → St. Louis Kutis

International career
1954–1957	United States	6	(0)
Medal record
Men's soccer
Representing the United States
Pan American Games
Bronze medal – third place	1959 Chicago	Team competition
- * Club domestic league appearances and goals

Herman William Wecke (March 10, 1927 – November 19, 2015) was a U.S. soccer defender. He earned six caps with the U.S. national team between 1954 and 1957. He was a member of the U.S. Olympic soccer team at the 1956 Summer Olympics.

== Club career ==
Wecke grew up in St. Louis, Missouri, where he graduated from Cleveland High School in 1945. While in high school, he played for the Schumacher juniors. The nature of team sponsorship in St. Louis during the 1940s and 1950s make it seem as if Wecke jumped between teams during his career. He actually only played for two teams; however, sponsorship changes led to several team name changes. In 1948, he turned professional with Paul Schulte Motors which became McMahon Pontiac for the 1949-1950 St. Louis Major League season. In April 1950, he jumped to Zenthoefer Furs which had been hit with several injuries as it prepared for a National Amateur Cup game. The team won the 1950, St. Louis Major League title. He then returned to his original team, now known as the St. Louis Raiders, for the 1951–1952. When Tom Kutis began sponsoring the team in 1953, the team was renamed St. Louis Kutis S.C. and Wecke remained with it until 1960. He was part of the Kutis team which won the 1957 National Challenge Cup and five consecutive National Amateur Cups from 1956 to 1960.

== National and Olympic team ==
Wecke was a mainstay of the U.S. national team, playing all seven U.S. games from April 3, 1954, through the end of 1957. On April 3 and 4, 1954, the U.S. defeated Haiti in two qualification matches for the 1954 FIFA World Cup. However, by the time the U.S. played these two games, it had already been eliminated due to earlier loses to Mexico. Wecke played the only U.S. game in 1955, a 3–2 loss to Iceland. He then played in all four of the U.S. games in 1957. While the national team was idle in 1956, Wecke was not. He was part of the U.S. soccer team at the 1956 Summer Olympics in Melbourne, Australia. In the games, the U.S. lost to Yugoslavia in the first round of the single elimination tournament. In 1959, Wecke played on the U.S. soccer team at the 1959 Pan American games. The U.S. took the bronze medal in those games.

Wecke was inducted into the St. Louis Soccer Hall of Fame on October 26, 1983.

== Family ==
Herman was the husband of Joan Allen, married on October 6, 1951. He was the father of Richard, who played for Benedictine College, Matthew who played at Forest Park CC and Southeast Missouri State and Christopher who played at Southeast Missouri State University. He had five grandchildren and one great-grandchild. His father, Herman Wecke, was a long-time sportswriter for the St. Louis Post Dispatch and the St. Louis Cardinals official scorer in the 1926 World Series.
