= Ron Maierhofer =

American soccer player

Personal information
- Full name: Ronald P. Maierhofer
- Date of birth: 1935 (age 90–91)
- Place of birth: Buffalo, New York, U.S.
- Position: Forward

Youth career
- 1956–1959: Cornell Big Red

International career
Years	Team	Apps	(Gls)
- United States Pan-American
Medal record
Men's football (soccer)
Representing the United States
Pan American Games
Bronze medal – third place	1959 Chicago	Team competition

Ronald P. Maierhofer is an American retired soccer forward who owned the Denver Avalanche of the Major Indoor Soccer League.

== Player ==
Maierhofer graduated from the Park School of Buffalo, New York in 1953. At Park, he was a four-year soccer letterman. Maierhofer also achieved All-League honors in basketball, track and baseball. He is a member of the Park School Hall of Fame. He then attended Cornell University where he was a 1959 Second Team All American soccer player. In addition to playing soccer, he was also a midfielder on the lacrosse team in 1958 and 1959 and was a member of the Quill and Dagger society. He graduated in 1960 with a bachelor's degree in Industrial and Labor Relations and was inducted into the Cornell University Athletic Hall of Fame in 1986. In 1959, he played for the U.S. soccer team which placed third at the Pan American Games. However, the matches were not counted as official U.S. national team matches. He briefly played for a team based in Toronto.

== Team owner ==
In 1979, Maierhofer was the Vice President of Operations for IHS Inc. when he decided he wanted to own a soccer team. He decided to place the team in Denver, Colorado and after a successful application to Major Indoor Soccer League, he was awarded the franchise in February 1980. The team played two seasons in MISL before entering bankruptcy in 1983.
