= Alex Ely =

American soccer player (1938–2021)

Personal information
- Full name: Alexandre Ely
- Date of birth: February 9, 1938
- Place of birth: Mogi das Cruzes, Brazil
- Date of death: September 28, 2021 (aged 83)
- Position: Midfielder

Senior career*
Years	Team	Apps	(Gls)
1959–1965	Ukrainian Nationals		
1960	New York Americans		
1961, 1962	Toronto Roma		
1964, 1965	Toronto City		
1965–1972	Santos		
1972	Philadelphia Spartans		
1973–1974	Delaware Wings		
- Philadelphia United German-Hungarians

International career
1960–1965	United States	4	(0)

Managerial career
- 1960–1965: University of Maryland (assistant)
- 1972: Philadelphia Spartans
- 1972–1976: Monsignor Bonner High School
- 1981–1994: Archbishop Carroll High School
- 1996–1997: Swarthmore College
Medal record
Men's football (soccer)
Representing the United States
Pan American Games
Bronze medal – third place	1959 Chicago	Team competition
- * Club domestic league appearances and goals

Alexandre "Alex" Ely (Ukrainian: Олександр (Олесь) Ілай, February 9, 1938 – September 28, 2021) was a Brazilian-American soccer midfielder, teacher and author. Ely played extensively in the U.S., Canada and Brazil winning multiple league and cup titles. He also earned four caps with the U.S. national team between 1960 and 1965. In addition to his extensive professional resume, Ely coached at the high school, collegiate and professional levels. He was inducted into the United States National Soccer Hall of Fame in 1997.

== Club career ==
In 1958, Ely spent a single season in the Philadelphia United Soccer League, an amateur city league. In 1959, he signed with the Ukrainian Nationals of the American Soccer League (ASL). Over his six seasons with the Nationals, the team won four league championships and three National Challenge Cup titles. In both 1961 and 1963, Ely and his teammates took the "double" of league and cup championships. The Nationals spent one season in the Eastern Professional Soccer League in 1964–1965. However, the league folded at the end of the season.

Ely took every opportunity to play. In addition to the Nationals, he played with several teams in other leagues during the ASL off season. In 1960, he was with the New York Americans of the International Soccer League. Then in 1961 and 1962, he played with Toronto Roma of the Eastern Canada Professional Soccer League with whom he won a league championship. He returned to the Eastern Canada League in 1964 and 1965 with Toronto City. Ely's devotion to the game reached its height in 1965. In addition to playing for the Nationals and Toronto City, he also played in the German American Soccer League.

While playing in multiple leagues in two countries, Ely also attended the University of Maryland. He graduated with a bachelor's degree in foreign language education in 1964.

In 1965, Ely returned to Brazil where he became an English teacher and played professionally with Santos. In 1972, he returned to the U.S., settling in Philadelphia where he attended Temple University. While working on his master's degree, Ely both played for and coached the Philadelphia Spartans for the 1972 ASL season. The Spartans folded at the end of the season and Ely moved to the Delaware Wings of the ASL. The Wings folded at the end of the 1974 season.

He continued to play in the International United German Hungarian Old Timers tournaments from 1976 to 1985.

== International career ==
In 1959, Ely joined the U.S. national team at the Pan American Games. The U.S. took third place at the games, which are not considered a full international tournament. Following the games, the U.S. entered qualification for the 1960 Summer Olympics but a loss to Mexico on October 8 and a tie with Mexico on November 22 kept the U.S. out of the Olympic tournament.

Ely earned his first official cap with the U.S. national team on November 13, 1960, in a loss to Mexico in a World Cup qualifier. That loss put the U.S. out of contention for a spot in the cup. He did not play for the U.S. again until 1965. That year, he played three of the four World Cup qualification games, all in March. The U.S. tied Mexico 2–2 on March 7, Ely and his teammates lost the away game five days later in Mexico City. He missed the U.S. win over Honduras, but played in the 1–1 tie on March 21 which put the U.S. out of cup contention.

== Coaching career ==
Ely began coaching in 1960, while attending the University of Maryland. In addition to playing professionally and attending classes, he served as an assistant coach at the university until he graduated in 1964. In 1972, he spent a single season coaching the Philadelphia Spartans of the American Soccer League. After the Spartans folded, he was hired by Monsignor Bonner High School where he coached the boys team from 1972 to 1976. In 1981, he became the boys soccer coach at Archbishop Carroll High School. In 1996, he was hired as the women's coach at Swarthmore College. In his two seasons with the team, he compiled an 11-26-3 record.

In addition to coaching at the high school and collegiate levels, Ely also founded the America Kolping Soccer Club in 1975. He served as head coach for the club for twenty years. He later continued to coach with the Jersey Shore Boca soccer club.

== Later life ==
When Ely returned to Brazil in 1965, he taught English for seven years. He authored two English textbooks, A New Approach to English and Intermediate Course. After returning to the U.S., he earned a master's degree from Temple University in English Education before becoming a teacher in Philadelphia, Pennsylvania at Cardinal Dougherty High School and later Archbishop Prendergast High School.

Ely authored the novel Destiny At Dawn as well as his memoir, From Hell To The National Hall Of Fame.
