= Jorge Bartero =

Argentine footballer

Personal information
- Full name: Jorge Osvaldo Bartero
- Date of birth: 28 December 1957 (age 68)
- Place of birth: Buenos Aires, Argentina
- Position: Goalkeeper

Senior career*
Years	Team	Apps	(Gls)
1977–1989	Vélez Sársfield	163	(0)
1985	→ Almirante Brown (loan)	30	(0)
1990–1991	Unión de Santa Fe	37	(0)
1991–1993	Racing Club	15	(0)
1993–1994	Deportivo Italiano	30	(0)
1994–1995	Chacarita Juniors	9	(0)

International career
1987	Argentina	0	(0)
- * Club domestic league appearances and goals as of October 2008

Jorge Osvaldo Bartero (born 28 December 1957 in Buenos Aires) is a retired Argentine football goalkeeper. He played for a number of clubs in Argentina.

In 1987, he was a reserve goalkeeper in the Argentina that participated in the Copa América.

Bartero spent the majority of his career with Vélez Sársfield, he also played in the Argentine Primera with Unión de Santa Fe and Racing Club de Avellaneda. Towards the end of his career he played in the Argentine 2nd division with Deportivo Italiano and Chacarita Juniors.

He currently works as a goalkeeping coach in Vélez Sársfield.
