= Willy Schaller =

American soccer player and coach

Personal information
- Date of birth: February 23, 1933
- Place of birth: Bonlanden, Germany
- Date of death: January 3, 2015 (aged 81)
- Place of death: Lakewood, Colorado, U.S.
- Position: Defender

Senior career*
Years	Team	Apps	(Gls)
- Schwaben
- Blau-Weiss Gottschee

International career
1952	United States	1	(0)
Medal record
Men's soccer
Representing the United States
Pan American Games
Bronze medal – third place	1959 Chicago	Team competition
- * Club domestic league appearances and goals

Willy (Willie) Schaller (February 23, 1933 – January 3, 2015) was a U.S. soccer defender who played most of his career in the German American Soccer League. He also played on the U.S. soccer team at the 1952 Summer Olympics. He was inducted into the National Soccer Hall of Fame in 1996.

== Club career ==
While born in Germany, Schaller's family moved to the United States when he was a young boy. He joined Schwaben of the German American Soccer League when he was in high school. In 1953, he joined the U.S. Army, serving until 1955. At some point, he moved to Blau-Weiss Gottschee, playing with the team through at least 1960.

== National teams ==
In 1952, he was selected to the U.S. soccer team which competed in the 1952 Summer Olympics. He was nineteen at the time. The U.S. lost its first game of the single elimination tournament to Italy. In 1959, he was with the U.S. team which won the bronze medal at the Pan American Games. However, the Pan American matches were not counted as official U.S. national team games.

== Coaching ==
After retiring from playing professionally, Schaller became a youth and high school soccer coach.
