= Gene Grabowski (soccer) =

American soccer player

International career
Years	Team	Apps	(Gls)
	United States	1	
Medal record
Men's football (soccer)
Representing the United States
Pan American Games
Bronze medal – third place	1959 Chicago	Team competition

Gene Grabowski is an American former soccer forward who earned a cap with the United States men's national soccer team in a 1958 FIFA World Cup qualification game.

== Club career ==
Grabowksi graduated from Kearny High School of Kearny, New Jersey in 1953. In 1999, he was named by The Star-Ledger as one of the top ten New Jersey high school soccer players of the 1940s-1960s. He spent at least one season with the Elizabeth Falcons of the American Soccer League (ASL) as he led the ASL in scoring with 19 goals during the 1955–1956 season. That season, the Falcons lost the championship game to Uhrik Truckers.

== National team ==
Grabowski earned one caps with the U.S. national team on April 7, 1957. That game, a 7–0 loss to Mexico was a qualifier for the 1958 FIFA World Cup. Grabowski also scored one goal with the U.S. in its 7–2 victory over Haiti in the 1959 Pan American Games. The U.S. took the bronze medals at those games, which are not recognized internationals.
