= José Francisco Reinoso =

Cuban footballer (born 1950)

Personal information
- Full name: José Francisco Reinoso Zayas
- Date of birth: 20 May 1950 (age 76)
- Place of birth: Encrucijada, Cuba
- Position: Goalkeeper

Senior career*
Years	Team	Apps	(Gls)
- FC Azucareros
- Villa Clara

International career
1976–1981	Cuba		
- * Club domestic league appearances and goals

José Francisco Reinoso Zayas (born 20 May 1950) is a Cuban retired footballer who competed in the 1976 Summer Olympics and in the 1980 Summer Olympics.

== International career ==
He also represented his country in 9 FIFA World Cup qualification matches.

== Football administration ==
After retiring as a player, he was president of the Football Association of Cuba and a member of the executive committee of the Caribbean Futsal Association.

== Personal life ==
Reinoso was born in Encrucijada to Francisco and Martha Reinoso and has two sons and three grandchildren.
