= Victor Ottoboni =

American soccer player

Vittorio Ottoboni
Personal information
- Date of birth: 5 April 1934
- Date of death: 15 October 2014 (aged 80)

Team information
- Current team: San Francisco Vikings

Vittorio "Victor" Ottoboni (April 5, 1934 – October 15, 2014) was a U.S. soccer goalkeeper who earned one cap with the U.S. national team in an 8–1 loss to England on May 28, 1959. He played his club soccer with the San Francisco Vikings.
