= Val Pelizzaro =

American soccer player (1931–2019)

Personal information
- Date of birth: 1931
- Date of death: September 28, 2019 (aged 88)

International career
Years	Team	Apps	(Gls)
- United States
Medal record
Men's football (soccer)
Representing the United States
Pan American Games
Bronze medal – third place	1959 Chicago	Team competition

Val Pelizzaro (1931 – September 28, 2019) was an American soccer player who spent his entire fifteen-year club career with St. Louis Kutis S.C. and earned two caps with the U.S. national team in 1957. He later served as an assistant coach with Saint Louis University and Washington University in St. Louis. He was of Italian ancestry. Val died on September 28, 2019.

== Club career ==
Pelizzaro graduated from St. Mary's High School of St. Louis in 1951. Val played for the St. Louis Raiders in 1951–1952, which the team won the U.S. Amateur Cup that year. In 1952, he signed with Kutis S.C., playing for the team until 1967. During those years, Kutis won the U.S. Amateur Cup 6 consecutive seasons (1956 to 1961) and in 1957 the team also won the National Challenge Cup, totaling 8 national championships in all as a player. Pelizzaro was inducted into the St. Louis Soccer Hall of Fame in 1984, St. Mary's High School Hall of Fame in 1993, St. Louis University Hall of Fame in 2003, and was enshrined as a Legend of St. Louis Soccer by the St. Louis Sports Hall of Fame in 2017.

== International career ==
After Kutis won the 1957 National Cup, the US Football Association decided to call up the entire team to represent the U.S. in two World Cup qualification games. As a result, Pelizzaro earned two caps with the U.S. national team, both losses to Canada. The first was a 5–1 loss on June 22, 1957. The second game was a July 6 loss to Canada. He was also a member of the U.S. soccer team that earned a bronze medal at the 1959 Pan American Games. He was also a member of the U.S. Olympic soccer team.

== Coaching career ==
After retiring from playing in 1967, Pelizzaro was hired as an assistant coach at Saint Louis University. He served under head coach Harry Keough from 1967 to 1982 and then under coach Joe Clarke from 1982 to 1996. In that stretch, SLU won five NCAA championships and were runners-up three times. In 1997, Clarke and Pelizzaro moved to Washington University in St Louis. Pelizzaro has coached over 800 collegiate soccer games with a winning percentage of over 72%. Pelizzaro also coached for Visitation Academy high school with Tom Fernandez and Dick Westbrook. During his tenure there Visitation teams won three state championships and numerous district championships as well.

== Personal life and death ==
He died September 28, 2019.
