= Ernesto Duchini =

Argentine footballer and coach

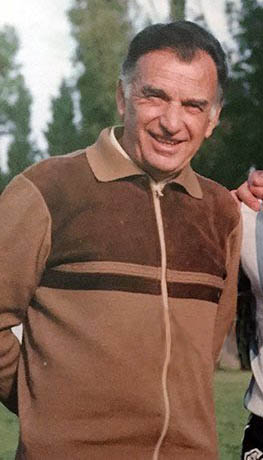
- Duchini in 1979

Personal information
- Full name: Ernesto Emilio Duchini
- Date of birth: November 10, 1910
- Place of birth: Buenos Aires, Argentina
- Date of death: March 19, 2006
- Position: Midfielder

Youth career
- 1922–1928: Chacarita Juniors

Senior career*
Years	Team	Apps	(Gls)
1928–1938	Chacarita Juniors	145	(5)

Managerial career
- 1939–1943: Chacarita Juniors
- 1954–1974: Argentina youth
- * Club domestic league appearances and goals as of September 2008

Ernesto Emilio Duchini (November 10, 1910 – March 19, 2006) was an Argentine footballer and later a football coach. He was part of the coaching team that led Argentina to the FIFA World Youth Championship in 1979.

Duchini was born in the Barrio Norte district of Buenos Aires on November 10, 1910, at a young age his family moved to Chacarita where he joined the youth team of Chacarita Juniors in 1922. He made his debut in 1928 and played for the club until his retirement in 1938.

After retiring as a player Duchini became a coach, he took charge of Chacarita Juniors in 1939 and in 1941 he led the team to the Argentine 2nd Division championship. he stayed with the club until 1943.

During the 1940s, 1950s and 1960s he worked as a youth coach at San Lorenzo, Racing Club, River Plate and Independiente.

In 1954 he was appointed youth coach for the Argentina national team, a position he held for 20 years. During his reign he won the Pan American Games in 1955 and 1959.

In 1974, he became assessor of youth development, a position he held until 1994. He was part of the coaching team that led the Argentina under 20 team to their first World Youth Championship in 1979.

Duchini died on March 19, 2006, at the age of 95 in the Pirovano Hospital, he is buried in the La Chacarita Cemetery.

== Titles ==
=== As coach ===
Chacarita Juniors

- Primera B (1): 1941

Argentina

- Pan American Games (1): 1959
