= José Díaz (footballer, born 1938) =

Argentine footballer

Personal information
- Date of birth: 20 April 1938 (age 88)
- Position: Defender

Senior career*
| Years | Team | Apps | (Gls) |
- Lanús
- * Club domestic league appearances and goals

José Díaz (born 20 April 1938) is an Argentine former footballer who competed in the 1960 Summer Olympics.
