= Edílson (footballer, born 1941) =

Brazilian footballer

Personal information
- Full name: Edílson Rodrigues Vieira
- Date of birth: 31 July 1941
- Place of birth: Rio de Janeiro, Brazil
- Date of death: 18 March 2024 (aged 82)
- Place of death: Rio de Janeiro, Brazil
- Position: Defender

Youth career
- Vasco da Gama

Senior career*
Years	Team	Apps	(Gls)
1959–1963	Vasco da Gama		
1963–1966	Portuguesa	175	(1)
1967–1969	São Paulo	58	(0)
1970	Bangu		

International career
1959	Brazil Olympic	8	(0)
1965	Brazil	1	(0)
Medal record
Men's Football
Representing Brazil
Pan American Games
Silver medal – second place	1959 Chicago
- * Club domestic league appearances and goals

Edílson Rodrigues Vieira (31 July 1941 – 18 March 2024), known as just Edílson, was a Brazilian footballer.

== Clubs career ==
Revealed by the amateur sectors of Vasco da Gama, Edílson also stood out playing for Portuguesa de Desportos, São Paulo FC and Bangu.

== International career ==
Edílson was part of the Brazil national team that competed in the 1959 Pan American Games, where the team won the silver medal. He made one appearance for the Brazil national team in 1965.

== Death ==
Edílson died at the age of 82, on 18 March 2024, in Rio de Janeiro.
