= Maranhão (footballer, born 1942) =

Brazilian footballer

Personal information
- Full name: José Ribamar Celestino
- Date of birth: 30 June 1942
- Place of birth: São Luís, Maranhão, Brazil
- Date of death: 22 August 2007 (aged 65)
- Place of death: Rio de Janeiro, Brazil
- Position: Midfielder

Senior career*
Years	Team	Apps	(Gls)
1960–1967	Vasco da Gama		
1967–1968	Comercial-SP		
1972–1976	ABC		

International career
1959–1960	Brazil Olympic	13	(2)
Medal record
Men's Football
Representing Brazil
Pan American Games
Silver medal – second place	1959 Chicago
- * Club domestic league appearances and goals

José Ribamar Celestino (30 June 1942 – 22 August 2007) was a Brazilian footballer who represented the Brazil national team at the 1959 Pan American Games and the 1960 Summer Olympics.

Maranhão stood out playing for the teams Vasco da Gama, Comercial de Ribeirão Preto and ABC. He died after suffering a heart attack during a masters match in Vista Alegre, Rio de Janeiro.
