= Roberto Rodrigues =

Brazilian footballer

Personal information
- Full name: Roberto Rodrigues Passos
- Date of birth: 12 March 1939 (age 87)
- Position: Forward

Senior career*
Years	Team	Apps	(Gls)
1958–1962	Flamengo		

International career
1959	Brazil	6	(4)
Medal record
Men's Football
Representing Brazil
Pan American Games
Silver medal – second place	1959 Chicago
- * Club domestic league appearances and goals

Roberto Rodrigues Pessoa (born 12 March 1939) is a Brazilian former footballer. He played for Flamengo Rio de Janeiro between 1958 and 1962 making 67 appearances and scoring 15 goals. He also had 8 caps for the Brazil national football team, scoring 5 goals, and represented them at the 1959 Pan American Games, where the team won the silver medal.
