= Humberto (footballer, born 1939) =

Brazilian footballer

Personal information
- Full name: Humberto Martins Barbosa
- Date of birth: 10 June 1939 (age 87)
- Place of birth: Rio de Janeiro, Brazil
- Position: Forward

Senior career*
Years	Team	Apps	(Gls)
1958–1960	Flamengo		
1960–1963	Vasco da Gama		

International career
1959	Brazil		
Medal record
Men's Football
Representing Brazil
Pan American Games
Silver medal – second place	1959 Chicago
- * Club domestic league appearances and goals

Humberto Martins Barbosa (born 10 June 1939) is a Brazilian former footballer.

Humberto represented the Brazil national team at the 1959 Pan American Games, where the team won the silver medal.
