= Manuel (footballer, born 1941) =

Brazilian footballer

Personal information
- Full name: Manuel Martins de Souza
- Date of birth: 5 February 1941 (age 85)
- Place of birth: Nova Friburgo, Rio de Janeiro
- Position: Forward

Senior career*
Years	Team	Apps	(Gls)
1959–1964	Fluminense	62	(38)
1960	→ Bonsucesso (loan)	17	(8)
1962	→ Bonsucesso (loan)	22	(10)
1965	América	4	(0)
1965	Olaria		
1965–1967	Santa Cruz		
1967–1970	Vitória de Guimarães		
1970–1972	Tirsense		

International career
1959	Brazil	5	(1)
Medal record
Men's Football
Representing Brazil
Pan American Games
Silver medal – second place	1959 Chicago
- * Club domestic league appearances and goals

Manuel Martins da Souza (born 5 February 1941), known as Manuel, is a Brazilian former footballer.

Manuel represented the Brazil national team at the 1959 Pan American Games, where the team won the silver medal.
