= Raúl Pérez (Argentine footballer) =

Argentine footballer (1939–2014)

Personal information
- Full name: Raúl Adolfo Pérez
- Date of birth: 11 November 1939
- Place of birth: Buenos Aires
- Date of death: 26 April 2014 (aged 74)
- Position: Forward

Senior career*
| Years | Team | Apps | (Gls) |
| 1957-1965 | Boca Juniors | | |
| 1965-1966 | Deportivo Español | | |

International career
| 1960 | Argentina Olympic | 3 | (1) |
- * Club domestic league appearances and goals

Raúl Adolfo Pérez (11 November 1939 – 26 April 2014) was an Argentine footballer who competed in the 1960 Summer Olympics. Pérez died on 26 April 2014, at the age of 74.
