= Hércules (footballer, born 1940) =

Brazilian footballer

Personal information
- Full name: Hércules Corrêa Torres
- Date of birth: 25 March 1940
- Date of death: 23 December 2017 (aged 77)
- Place of death: Rio de Janeiro, Brazil
- Position: Defender

Senior career*
Years	Team	Apps	(Gls)
1959–1961	Fluminense		
1961–1962	Madureira		

International career
1959	Brazil	2	(0)
Medal record
Men's Football
Representing Brazil
Pan American Games
Silver medal – second place	1959 Chicago
- * Club domestic league appearances and goals

Hércules Corrêa Torres (25 March 1940 – 23 December 2017), known as just Hércules, was a Brazilian footballer.

Hércules represented the Brazil national team at the 1959 Pan American Games, where the team won the silver medal. He died on 23 December 2017 in Rio de Janeiro.
