= Edmar (footballer, born 1941) =

Brazilian footballer

Personal information
- Full name: Edmar Japiassú Maia
- Date of birth: 30 January 1941
- Place of birth: Rio de Janeiro, Brazil
- Date of death: 20 December 2025 (aged 84)
- Position: Goalkeeper

Senior career*
Years	Team	Apps	(Gls)
1959–1960	Flamengo		
- Campo Grande
- Olaria

International career
1959–1960	Brazil Olympic	4	(0)
Medal record
Men's Football
Representing Brazil
Pan American Games
Silver medal – second place	1959 Chicago
- * Club domestic league appearances and goals

Edmar Japiassú Maia (30 January 1941 – 20 December 2025), known as just Edmar, was a Brazilian footballer who played as a goalkeeper. Edmar represented the Brazil national team at the 1959 Pan American Games, where the team won the silver medal, and in the 1960 Summer Olympics.
