= Viladônega =

Brazilian footballer (1942–2022)

Personal information
- Full name: Viladônega de Souza Rodrigues
- Date of birth: 8 June 1942
- Place of birth: Euclides da Cunha, Brazil
- Date of death: 2 August 2022 (aged 80)
- Place of death: Itapetinga, Brazil
- Positions: Midfielder; forward

Youth career
- 1954: Jequiá-BA
- 1954–1960: Vasco da Gama

Senior career*
Years	Team	Apps	(Gls)
1960–1963	Vasco da Gama	62	(29)
1963	→ Atlético Mineiro (loan)		
1964–1966	Atlético Mineiro	95	(41)
1966–1970	URT		

International career
1959	Brazil Olympic	2	(0)
Medal record
Men's Football
Representing Brazil
Pan American Games
Silver medal – second place	1959 Chicago
- * Club domestic league appearances and goals

Villadonega Souza Rodrigues (8 June 1942 – 2 August 2022), known as just Villadonega or Viladônega, was a Brazilian footballer.

Viladônega represented the Brazil national team at the 1959 Pan American Games, where the team won the silver medal. He joined Vasco da Gama at the age of 12 in 1954, played professionally from 1960 to 1963, appearing in 62 matches and scoring 29 goals, winning the Pentagonal Tournament in Mexico in 1963.

He played for Atlético-MG from mid-1963 until 1966, appearing in 95 games and scoring 41 goals. He was the Minas Gerais state champion and top scorer of the competition with 12 goals in 1963..

He ended his career at URT-MG and in the 70s returned to Bahia, where he became a visual artist in the city of Itapetinga.

== Honours ==
Atlético Mineiro

- Campeonato Mineiro: 1963
- Taça Minas Gerais: 1963

Vasco da Gama

- Campeonato Carioca (Aspirantes): 1960 e 1961
- Torneio Pentagonal do México: 1963

Seleção do Rio de Janeiro

- Brasileiro de Seleções Estaduais amadoras: 1961
