= Zé Maria (footballer, born 1942) =

Brazilian footballer

Personal information
- Full name: José Maria da Silva
- Date of birth: 27 August 1942 (age 84)
- Position: Forward

Senior career*
Years	Team	Apps	(Gls)
- Bangu

International career
1959	Brazil		
Medal record
Men's Football
Representing Brazil
Pan American Games
Silver medal – second place	1959 Chicago
- * Club domestic league appearances and goals

José Maria da Silva (born 27 August 1942) is a Brazilian former footballer.

Zé Maria represented the Brazil national team at the 1959 Pan American Games, where the team won the silver medal.
