= Nélson Purchio =

Brazilian footballer

Personal information
- Date of birth: 26 June 1941
- Date of death: 30 October 2015 (aged 74)
- Position: Defender

Senior career*
Years	Team	Apps	(Gls)
- Fluminense

International career
1959	Brazil	6	(0)
Medal record
Men's Football
Representing Brazil
Pan American Games
Silver medal – second place	1959 Chicago
- * Club domestic league appearances and goals

Nélson Purchio (26 June 1941 – 30 October 2015) was a Brazilian footballer.

Nélson represented the Brazil national team at the 1959 Pan American Games, where the team won the silver medal.
