= Domingo Lejona =

Argentine footballer

Personal information
- Full name: Domingo Héctor Lejona
- Date of birth: 2 February 1938 (age 88)
- Place of birth: Chascomús, Buenos Aires, Argentina
- Position: Central defender

Senior career*
Years	Team	Apps	(Gls)
1958–1963	Gimnasia y Esgrima (La Plata)	72	(1)
1964–1967	Vélez Sársfield	60	(0)
1968	Chacarita Juniors	12	(1)
- * Club domestic league appearances and goals

Domingo Lejona (born 2 February 1938) is an Argentine former footballer. Lejona played club football for Gimnasia y Esgrima (La Plata), Vélez Sársfield and Chacarita Juniors. He was also part of Argentina's squad for the 1960 Summer Olympics, but he did not play in any matches.
