= Décio (footballer) =

Brazilian footballer (1941-2000)

Personal information
- Full name: Décio Randazzo Teixeira
- Date of birth: 28 December 1941
- Place of birth: Belo Horizonte, Brazil
- Date of death: 28 October 2000 (aged 58)
- Place of death: Belo Horizonte, Brazil
- Position: Defender

Senior career*
Years	Team	Apps	(Gls)
- América Mineiro
1963–1969	Atlético Mineiro	184	(4)

International career
1959–1960	Brazil Olympic	5	(0)
1968	Brazil	1	(0)
Medal record
Men's Football
Representing Brazil
Pan American Games
Silver medal – second place	1959 Chicago
- * Club domestic league appearances and goals

Décio Randazzo Teixeira (28 December 1941 – 28 October 2000), known as Décio, was a Brazilian footballer who played as a defender. He was part of the Brazil national team that competed in the 1959 Pan American Games and the 1960 Summer Olympics. He made one official appearance for Brazil in 1968.
