= Ouraci =

Brazilian footballer

Personal information
- Full name: Ouraci Francisco das Chagas
- Date of birth: 8 March 1941
- Place of birth: Itaguaí, Brazil
- Date of death: 20 June 2024 (aged 83)
- Place of death: Rio de Janeiro, Brazil
- Position: Defender

Senior career*
Years	Team	Apps	(Gls)
1960–1962	Flamengo		

International career
1959	Brazil		
Medal record
Men's Football
Representing Brazil
Pan American Games
Silver medal – second place	1959 Chicago
- * Club domestic league appearances and goals

Ouraci Francisco das Chagas (8 March 1941 – 20 June 2024) was a Brazilian footballer.

Ouraci represented the Brazil national football team at the 1959 Pan American Games, where the team won the silver medal.
