= Hilton (footballer, born 1942) =

Brazilian footballer

Personal information
- Full name: Hilton Cabral de Almeida
- Date of birth: 8 July 1942 (age 84)
- Position: Defender

Senior career*
Years	Team	Apps	(Gls)
1961–1963	Flamengo		

International career
1959	Brazil		
Medal record
Men's Football
Representing Brazil
Pan American Games
Silver medal – second place	1959 Chicago
- * Club domestic league appearances and goals

Hilton Cabral de Almeida (born 8 July 1942) is a Brazilian former footballer.

Hilton represented the Brazil national team at the 1959 Pan American Games, where the team won the silver medal.
