= Edson Borracha =

Brazilian footballer (born 1941)

Personal information
- Full name: Edson Luiz de Carvalho
- Date of birth: 21 October 1941 (age 85)
- Place of birth: Tarumirim, Brazil
- Position: Goalkeeper

Youth career
- 1959: Caratinga FC

Senior career*
Years	Team	Apps	(Gls)
1959–1966	Fluminense	56	(0)
1967	Vasco da Gama	2	(0)
1968	Bahia		
1969–1972	Nacional-AM		
1972	Madureira		
1973	Paysandu		
1974	Anapolina		

International career
1959	Brazil	2	(0)
Medal record
Men's Football
Representing Brazil
Pan American Games
Silver medal – second place	1959 Chicago
- * Club domestic league appearances and goals

Edson Luiz de Carvalho (born 21 October 1941), known as Edson Borracha, is a Brazilian former footballer.

Borracha represented the Brazil national team at the 1959 Pan American Games, where the team won the silver medal.
