= Pedro de Ciancio =

Argentine footballer

Personal information
- Date of birth: 16 February 1938 (age 88)
- Place of birth: Buenos Aires, Argentina
- Position: Defender

Senior career*
Years	Team	Apps	(Gls)
1960	Racing		
1965–1966	Almagro		

International career
1960	Argentina	1	(0)
- * Club domestic league appearances and goals

Pedro de Ciancio (born 16 February 1938) is an Argentine former footballer who competed in the 1960 Summer Olympics.
