= Françoso =

Brazilian footballer (born 1941)

Personal information
- Full name: Antônio Benedicto Françoso
- Date of birth: 12 March 1941 (age 85)
- Position: Forward

Senior career*
| Years | Team | Apps | (Gls) |
- Fluminense

International career
| 1959 | Brazil | 2 | (0) |
Medal record
Men's Football
Representing Brazil
Pan American Games
| Silver medal – second place | 1959 Chicago |
- * Club domestic league appearances and goals

Antônio Benedicto Françoso (born 12 March 1941), known as just Françoso, is a Brazilian former footballer.

Françoso represented the Brazil national team at the 1959 Pan American Games, where the team won the silver medal.
