= José Vazquez (footballer) =

Argentine footballer (1940–2016)

Personal information
- Full name: José Ricardo Vázquez
- Date of birth: 7 December 1940
- Place of birth: San Martín, Argentina
- Date of death: 24 December 2016 (aged 76)
- Position: Defender

Senior career*
Years	Team	Apps	(Gls)
- Chacarita Juniors
- Racing Club
- Atalanta

International career
1963–1964	Argentina	11	(0)
- * Club domestic league appearances and goals

José Ricardo Vazquez (7 December 1940 – 24 December 2016) was an Argentine footballer. He played in 11 matches for the Argentina national football team in 1963 and 1964. He was also part of Argentina's squad for the 1963 South American Championship.
