= Ed Murphy (soccer) =

American soccer player

Personal information
- Full name: Edward John Murphy
- Date of birth: November 6, 1930
- Place of birth: Inchinnan, Scotland
- Date of death: December 5, 2005 (aged 75)
- Place of death: Pompano Beach, Florida, U.S.
- Height: 6 ft 1 in (1.85 m)
- Position: Forward

Senior career*
Years	Team	Apps	(Gls)
- Chicago Vikings
- Chicago Maroons
- Chicago Slovak
1968	Chicago Mustangs	13	(2)

International career
1955–1969	United States	18	(5)
Medal record
Men's soccer
Representing the United States
Pan American Games
Bronze medal – third place	1959 Chicago	Team competition
- * Club domestic league appearances and goals

Edward John Murphy (November 6, 1930 – December 5, 2005) was a soccer player who played as a forward. He played professionally in the National Soccer League of Chicago and the North American Soccer League. Born in Scotland, he earned seventeen caps and scored five goals for the United States national team from 1955 to 1969.

== Professional career ==
Murphy spent most of his career as an amateur with National Soccer League of Chicago clubs, including Maroon and Slovak. He led the Slovaks to the 1953 National Amateur Cup championship. He also spent a single season as a professional in 1968 with the Chicago Mustangs of the North American Soccer League (NASL). However, his greatest achievements came as a member of various U.S. national teams. In 1956, he was a member of the U.S. team which lost to Yugoslavia 9–1 at the 1956 Summer Olympics. In 1959, he saw greater success when the U.S. took the bronze medal at the Pan American Games which was played in his hometown of Chicago. In those games, Murphy scored eight goals, including a hat trick in the U.S. victory over Brazil and another two goals in the U.S. defeat of Mexico in the bronze medal game. He was also part of the team which failed to qualify for the 1960 Summer Olympics. None of these statistics count towards Murphy's national team statistics as they were considered less than full international matches.

== National team ==
Murphy earned his third cap with the U.S. national team in a May 28, 1959 loss (8–1) to England. Murphy scored the lone U.S. goal. Murphy went on to start in both U.S. games in 1960, then came on as a sub in the one U.S. game of 1961, a loss to Colombia in Bogotá. The U.S. had no games in 1962 and Murphy did not play with the U.S. in its only game of 1963. He rejoined the U.S. for the 10-0 shellacking at the hand of England in 1964. In 1965, the U.S. began qualifications for the 1966 FIFA World Cup. Murphy played in all four games as the U.S. failed to qualify with a 1-1-2 record. However, Murphy scored a goal in the U.S. 1–0 victory and 1–1 tie with Honduras. He then saw time in about half of the U.S. games in 1968 and closed out his national team career as a starter in both U.S. games of 1969 as the U.S. lost two games to Haiti in the first round of qualification for the 1970 FIFA World Cup.

He was inducted into the National Soccer Hall of Fame in 1998 and the USASA Hall of Fame in 2009. He died on December 5, 2005.

== See also ==
- List of United States men's international soccer players born outside the United States
