= Roberto Blanco (footballer) =

Argentine footballer (1938–2011)

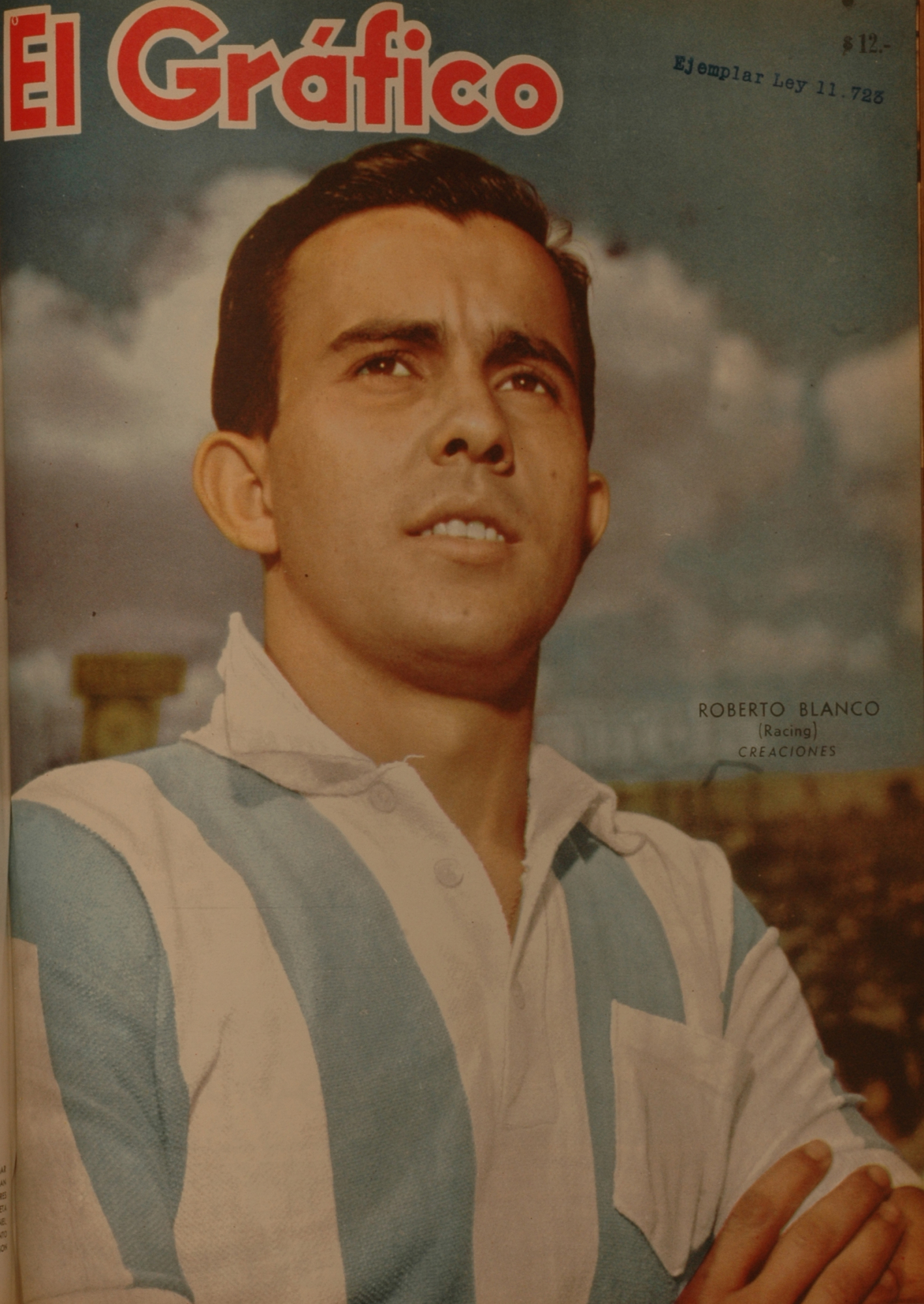
- Roberto Blanco in 1961.

Personal information
- Date of birth: 26 November 1938
- Place of birth: Buenos Aires
- Date of death: 19 March 2011 (aged 72)
- Position: Midfielder

Senior career*
Years	Team	Apps	(Gls)
1960-1962	Racing	43	(1)
1963-1965	Chacarita Juniors	74	(0)

International career
1960	Argentina Olympic	3	(0)
- * Club domestic league appearances and goals

Roberto Blanco (26 November 1938 – 19 March 2011) was an Argentine footballer who competed in the 1960 Summer Olympics. Blanco died on 19 March 2011, at the age of 72.
