= China (footballer, born 1939) =

Brazilian footballer (1939–1990)

Personal information
- Date of birth: 11 September 1939
- Place of birth: Fortaleza, Brazil
- Date of death: 1990 (aged 51)
- Place of death: Rapallo, Italy
- Height: 1.80 m (5 ft 11 in)
- Position: Striker

Senior career*
Years	Team	Apps	(Gls)
1959–1962	Botafogo		
1962–1965	Sampdoria	75	(30)
1965–1966	Roma	12	(3)
1966–1967	Vicenza	12	(4)
1967–1968	Mantova	2	(0)
1969–1972	Bangu		

International career
1959–1960	Brazil Olympic	16	(17)
Medal record
Men's Football
Representing Brazil
Pan American Games
Silver medal – second place	1959 Chicago
- * Club domestic league appearances and goals

José Ricardo da Silva, also known as China (11 September 1939 – 1990) was a Brazilian professional footballer who played as a forward. He also represented the Brazil national team at the 1959 Pan American Games and the 1960 Summer Olympics.

He died at the end of the year 1990, at the age of 51.

da Silva played for six seasons (101 games, 37 goals) in the Italian Serie A for U.C. Sampdoria, A.S. Roma, L.R. Vicenza and A.C. Mantova.

== Honours ==
Botafogo

- Campeonato Carioca: 1961, 1962
- Torneio Rio-São Paulo: 1962
