= Elson Beiruth =

Brazilian footballer (1941-2012)

Personal information
- Full name: Elson Iazegi Beyruth
- Date of birth: October 20, 1941
- Place of birth: São João da Barra, Brazil
- Date of death: August 15, 2012
- Place of death: Santiago, Chile
- Position: Forward

Senior career*
Years	Team	Apps	(Gls)
1959–1960	Flamengo		
1960–1961	Corinthians		
1962–1963	Esportiva		
1964	Flamengo		
1965–1972	Colo-Colo	243	(113)
1973	Magallanes	25	(7)
1974	Regional Antofagasta	14	(2)
1975	Santiago Morning	14	(0)

Managerial career
- 1984: Palestino
- * Club domestic league appearances and goals

Elson Iazegi Beyruth (20 October 1941 - 15 August 2012) was a Brazilian footballer.

He played for clubs in Brazil and Chile.

== Teams ==
=== Player ===
- Flamengo 1959–1960
- Corinthians 1960–1961
- Esportiva 1962–1963
- Flamengo 1964
- Colo-Colo 1965-1972
- Magallanes 1973
- Regional Antofagasta 1974
- Santiago Morning 1975

=== Manager ===
- Palestino 1984

== Titles ==
- Colo-Colo 1970 and 1972 (Chilean Primera División Championship)
