= Brazil at the 1987 Pan American Games =

- IOC code: BRA
- NOC: Brazilian Olympic Committee
- Website: www.cob.org.br

in Indianapolis 7–23 August 1987
- Competitors: 309 in 27 sports
- Flag bearer: Ronaldo de Carvalho
- Medals Ranked 4th: Gold 14 Silver 14 Bronze 33 Total 61

Pan American Games appearances (overview)
- 1951; 1955; 1959; 1963; 1967; 1971; 1975; 1979; 1983; 1987; 1991; 1995; 1999; 2003; 2007; 2011; 2015; 2019; 2023; 2027

Brazil competed at the 10th Pan American Games that were held in Indianapolis from August 7 to August 23, 1987.

== Medals ==
The following competitors from Brazil won medals at the games. In the by discipline sections below, medalists' names are bolded.

Medal	Name(s)	Sport	Event	Date	Ref
Silver	Robson Caetano	Athletics	Men's 200m	15 August 1987	
Silver	José Luiz Barbosa	Athletics	Men's 800m	16 August 1987	
Gold	Joaquim Cruz	Athletics	Men's 1500m	12 August 1987	
Gold	Adauto Domingues	Athletics	Men's 3000m steeplechase	12 August 1987	
Silver	Adauto Domingues	Athletics	Men's 5000m	13 August 1987	
Gold	Ivo Rodrigues	Athletics	Men's marathon	9 August 1987	
Bronze	Soraya Telles	Athletics	Women's 800m	16 August 1987	
Bronze	Claudileia Oliveira; Cleide Amaral; Inês Ribeiro; Sheila Santos	Athletics	Women's 4 × 100 m relay	16 August 1987	
Gold	Men's basketball team: André Ernesto Stoffel Gerson Victalino Israel Andrade João Vianna Jorge Guerra Marcel de Souza Maury de Souza Oscar Schmidt Paulinho Villas Boas Ricardo Guimarães Rolando Ferreira Sílvio Malvezi	Basketball	Men's tournament	23 August 1987	
Silver	Women's basketball team: Hortência Marcari Janeth Arcain Maria Angélica Maria José Bertolotti Maria Paula Silva Marta Sobral Nádia Bento de Lima Neusa Ribeiro Ruth Roberta de Souza Vânia Hernandes Vânia Somaio Teixeira Vanira Souza	Basketball	Women's tournament		
Bronze	Hamilton Rodrigues	Boxing	Men's flyweight (-51 kg)		
Bronze	Wanderley Oliveira	Boxing	Men's light welterweight (-63,5 kg)		
Bronze	Carlos Barcelete	Boxing	Men's super heavyweight (+91 kg)		
Silver	Marcos Mazzaron	Cycling	Men's race individual (road)		
Bronze	Antonio Carlos Hunger; Antônio Silvestre; Fernando Louro; Paulo Jamur	Cycling	Men's 4000m pursuit team (track)		
Gold	Men's football team: Ademir André Cruz Edu Marangon Cláudio Taffarel Pita Evair Geraldão Careca Luís Carlos Pereira Nelsinho Raí Ricardo Gomes Ricardo Rocha João Paulo Valdo Washington Douglas	Football	Men's tournament	21 August 1987	
Bronze	Carlos Fulcher; Carlos Sabino; Gerson Gnoatto; Guilherme Pinto; Marco Monteiro; Ricardo Nassar	Gymnastics	Men's all-around team		
Bronze	Luísa Parente	Gymnastics	Women's uneven bars		
Bronze	Men's handball team: Drean Dutra Edson Rizzo Everaldo Lopes Gilberto Cardoso José Ronaldo do Nascimento José Luiz Ramalho José Luiz Vieira Luiz Sumaio Marcelo Sampaio Osvaldo Inocente Filho Paulo Bittar Sergio Hortelan Vinicius Tetti	Handball	Men's tournament		
Bronze	Women's handball team: Anita Pires Carla Vasconcelos Cláudia Monteiro Eliane Dias Elza Giovanelli Isabela Maroja Kelma Silva Márcia Tornin Márcia Tomadon Margarete Pioresan Nivia da Cruz Simone Dias Tania Becker	Handball	Women's tournament		
Gold	Sérgio Pessoa	Judo	Men's extra lightweight (-60 kg)		
Silver	Nelson Onmura	Judo	Men's half lightweight (-65 kg)		
Silver	Luís Onmura	Judo	Men's lightweight (-71 kg)		
Gold	Rinaldo Caggiano	Judo	Men's middleweight (-86 kg)		
Gold	Aurélio Miguel	Judo	Men's half heavyweight (-95 kg)		
Silver	Frederico Flexa	Judo	Men's heavyweight (+95 kg)		
Bronze	Rogério Cherubim	Judo	Men's open class		
Gold	Monica Angelucci	Judo	Women's extra lightweight (-48 kg)		
Bronze	Soraya Carvalho	Judo	Women's half middleweight (-61 kg)		
Gold	Soraia André	Judo	Women's half heavyweight (-72 kg)		
Bronze	Rosimeri Salvador	Judo	Women's heavyweight (+72 kg)		
Bronze	Ivana Santana	Judo	Women's open class		
Bronze	Men's roller hockey team: Cláudio Gomes Ermano Santos Fabio Mainardi Fernando Jesus Lauro Terroso Neto Leônidas Agra Maurício Duque Roberto Caribe Silvio Brancacco Vitor Manuel Santos	Roller sports	Roller hockey		
Gold	Ricardo de Carvalho; Ronaldo de Carvalho	Rowing	Men's coxless pair-oared shells		
Bronze	João Deboni; José Augusto Almeida	Rowing	Men's lightweight coxless pair		
Silver	Ângelo Roso Neto; Carlos Bezerra; Cláudio Tavares; Dênis Marinho; Flávio de Melo; Helder Lima; José Raimundo Ribeiro; Mauro Weber; Nilton Alonso	Rowing	Men's eight-oared shells		
Silver	Jonas Penteado	Sailing	Men's Laser class		
Bronze	Ivan Pimenta; Marcos Vianna	Sailing	Snipe class		
Bronze	Carlos Courtney; Gastão Brun	Sailing	Star class		
Bronze	Carlos Wanderley; Cláudio Biekarck; Gunnar Ficker	Sailing	Lightning class		
Bronze	Daniel Adler; Ronaldo Senfft; Torben Grael	Sailing	Soling class		
Bronze	Alfredo Lalia; Benevenuto Tilli; Durval Guimarães	Shooting	Men's 25m center fire pistol team		
Bronze	Alain Dufour; Marcos José Olsen; Rodrigo Bastos	Shooting	Men's trap team		
Bronze	Nara Amaral	Shooting	Women's 50m pistol		
Silver	Ricardo Prado	Swimming	Men's 200m backstroke	11 August 1987	
Bronze	Ricardo Prado	Swimming	Men's 200m medley	15 August 1987	
Silver	Cristiano Michelena	Swimming	Men's 400m freestyle	13 August 1987	
Bronze	Cristiano Michelena; Cyro Delgado; Jorge Fernandes; Júlio López	Swimming	Men's 4 × 100 m freestyle relay	13 August 1987	
Bronze	Cícero Tortelli; Jorge Fernandes; Otávio Silva; Ricardo Prado	Swimming	Men's 4 × 100 m medley relay	15 August 1987	
Bronze	Cristiano Michelena; Cyro Delgado; Jorge Fernandes; Júlio López	Swimming	Men's 4 × 200 m freestyle relay	10 August 1987	
Bronze	Carlos Kawai	Table tennis	Men's singles		
Bronze	Cláudio Kano	Table tennis	Men's singles		
Silver	Cláudio Kano; Hugo Hoyama	Table tennis	Men's doubles		
Gold	Carlos Kawai; Cláudio Kano; Edson Takahashi; Hugo Hoyama	Table tennis	Men's team		
Bronze	Gilberto Medeiros	Taekwondo	Men's heavyweight (+83 kg)		
Gold	Fernando Roese	Tennis	Men's singles		
Gold	Gisele Miró	Tennis	Women's singles		
Bronze	Fernando Roese; Gisele Miró	Tennis	Mixed doubles		
Bronze	Men's volleyball team: Carlão Bernard Rajzman Domingos Maracanã Elberto Furtado Jr. Helder Zech José Francisco Filho Leonídio de Pra Luís Alexandre Rodrigues Marcelo Dutra Mario Xandó Netto Paulo Jukoski Silva Renan Dal Zotto	Volleyball	Men's tournament	23 August 1987	
Bronze	Men's water polo team: Ayrton Silva Eduardo Comini Eric Borges Fernando Rocha Filho Fernando Carsalade Francisco Chaves Neto Gilberto Gargiulo Gilberto Guimarães Hélio Gomes Filho José Meireles Mario Souto Sérgio Figueiredo Jr. Sílvio Manfredi	Water polo	Men's tournament		
Silver	Roberto Leitão	Wrestling	Men's freestyle light heavyweight (-90 kg)		

**Medals by sport**
**Sport**	1st place, gold medalist(s)	2nd place, silver medalist(s)	3rd place, bronze medalist(s)	Total
Judo	5	3	4	12
Athletics	3	3	2	8
Tennis	2	0	1	3
Table tennis	1	1	2	4
Rowing	1	1	1	3
Basketball	1	1	0	2
Football	1	0	0	1
Swimming	0	2	4	6
Sailing	0	1	4	5
Cycling	0	1	1	2
Wrestling	0	1	0	1
Boxing	0	0	3	3
Shooting	0	0	3	3
Handball	0	0	2	2
Gymnastics	0	0	2	2
Roller sports	0	0	1	1
Taekwondo	0	0	1	1
Volleyball	0	0	1	1
Waterpolo	0	0	1	1
**Total**	**14**	**14**	**33**	61

== See also ==
- Brazil at the 1988 Summer Olympics
