= Brazil at the 1983 Pan American Games =

- IOC code: BRA
- NOC: Brazilian Olympic Committee
- Website: www.cob.org.br

in Caracas 14–29 August 1983
- Competitors: 276 in 21 sports
- Flag bearer: Ricardo Prado
- Medals Ranked 4th: Gold 14 Silver 20 Bronze 23 Total 57

Pan American Games appearances (overview)
- 1951; 1955; 1959; 1963; 1967; 1971; 1975; 1979; 1983; 1987; 1991; 1995; 1999; 2003; 2007; 2011; 2015; 2019; 2023; 2027

Brazil competed at the 9th Pan American Games that were held in Caracas, Venezuela from August 14 to August 29, 1983.

== Medals ==
Medal	Name(s)	Sport	Event	Date	Ref
Bronze	Renato Emilio	Archery	Men's individual		
Bronze	Renato Emilio	Archery	Men's recurve 70m		
Bronze	Ana Beatriz Miranda; Cláudia Vasques; Martha Emilio	Archery	Women's team		
Bronze	Gérson de Souza	Athletics	Men's 400m	27 August 1983	
Silver	Antônio Ferreira	Athletics	Men's 400m hurdles	24 August 1983	
Gold	Agberto Guimarães	Athletics	Men's 800m	24 August 1983	
Silver	José Luíz Barbosa	Athletics	Men's 800m	24 August 1983	
Gold	Agberto Guimarães	Athletics	Men's 1500m	26 August 1983	
Bronze	Tom Hintnaus	Athletics	Men's pole vault	26 August 1983	
Bronze	Gérson de Souza; João Batista da Silva; Nelson dos Santos; Robson Caetano	Athletics	Men's 4 × 100 m relay	28 August 1983	
Silver	Agberto Guimarães; Evaldo da Silva; Gérson de Souza; José Luíz Barbosa	Athletics	Men's 4 × 400 m relay	28 August 1983	
Gold	Esmeralda Garcia	Athletics	Women's 100m	24 August 1983	
Gold	Conceição Geremias	Athletics	Women's heptathlon	25 August 1983	
Silver	Men's basketball team: Adilson Nascimento Fausto Gianecchini Gerson Victalino Israel Andrade Jorge Guerra Marcel de Souza Marcelo Vido Marcos Leite Milton Setrini Nilo Guimarães Ricardo Guimarães Sílvio Malvezi	Basketball	Men's tournament		
Bronze	Women's basketball team: Anne Krabenborg Dayse Mendes Elisa Garcia Hortência Marcari Maria Angélica Maria Paula Silva Marta Sobral Solange Castro Soraya Brandão Suzete Pereira Vanda dal Col Vânia Somaio Teixeira	Basketball	Women's tournament		
Bronze	Manoelito Santos	Boxing	Men's light flyweight (-48 kg)		
Bronze	Antonio Madureira	Boxing	Men's welterweight (-67 kg)		
Bronze	Antonio Carlos Hunger; Fernando Louro; Hans Fischer; Mauro Ribeiro	Cycling	Men's 4000m pursuit team (track)		
Bronze	Orlando Facada	Equestrian	Dressage		
Bronze	José Scheleder Filho; Lica Diniz; Orlando Facada	Equestrian	Dressage team		
Silver	Men's football team: Adalberto Dunga Boni Edson Souza Everaldo Heitor Hugo Jorginho Guto Neto Marcus Vinícius Mauricinho Paulo César Paulo Sérgio Paulinho Helinho João Brigatti Waldir Marquinhos	Football	Men's tournament	23 August 1983	
Bronze	Altair Prado; Claudia Magalhães; Denize Campos; Jaqueline Pires; Marian Fernandes; Tatiana Figueiredo	Gymnastics	Women's all-around team		
Silver	Luis Shinohara	Judo	Men's extra lightweight (-60 kg)		
Bronze	Sérgio Sano	Judo	Men's half lightweight (-65 kg)		
Silver	Luís Onmura	Judo	Men's lightweight (-71 kg)		
Bronze	Walter Carmona	Judo	Men's middleweight (-86 kg)		
Silver	Aurélio Miguel	Judo	Men's half heavyweight (-95 kg)		
Silver	Frederico Flexa	Judo	Men's heavyweight (+95 kg)		
Silver	Inêz Nazareth	Judo	Women's extra lightweight (-48 kg)		
Bronze	Solange Almeida	Judo	Women's half lightweight (-52 kg)		
Bronze	Tânia Ishii	Judo	Women's lightweight (-56 kg)		
Bronze	Carla Duarte	Judo	Women's half middleweight (-61 kg)		
Bronze	Soraia André	Judo	Women's heavyweight (+72 kg)		
Gold	Ricardo de Carvalho; Ronaldo de Carvalho	Rowing	Men's coxless pair-oared shells		
Silver	Dênis Marinho; José Raimundo Ribeiro; Mauro Weber; Nilton Alonso; Walter Soares	Rowing	Men's coxed four-oared shells		
Gold	Pedro Bulhões	Sailing	Men's Laser class		
Gold	José Luiz Ribeiro; Paulo Roberto Ribeiro	Sailing	Men's 470 class		
Silver	Peter Ficker; Werner Sonksen	Sailing	Star class		
Gold	Cláudio Biekarck; Gunnar Ficker; Ralph Berger	Sailing	Lightning class		
Gold	Daniel Adler; Ronaldo Senfft; Torben Grael	Sailing	Soling class		
Bronze	Delival Nobre	Shooting	Men's 25m standard pistol		
Silver	Sylvio Carvalho	Shooting	Men's 50m pistol		
Bronze	Durval Guimarães; Sylvio Carvalho; Wilson Scheidemantel	Shooting	Men's 50m pistol team		
Silver	Marcos José Olsen	Shooting	Men's trap		
Silver	Ricardo Prado	Swimming	Men's 200m backstroke	19 August 1983	
Silver	Ricardo Prado	Swimming	Men's 200m butterfly	21 August 1983	
Gold	Ricardo Prado	Swimming	Men's 200m medley	22 August 1983	
Bronze	Marcelo Jucá	Swimming	Men's 400m freestyle	20 August 1983	
Gold	Ricardo Prado	Swimming	Men's 400m medley	18 August 1983	
Silver	Marcelo Jucá	Swimming	Men's 1500m freestyle	22 August 1983	
Silver	Cyro Delgado; Djan Madruga; Jorge Fernandes; Ronald Menezes	Swimming	Men's 4 × 100 m freestyle relay	20 August 1983	
Silver	Cyro Delgado; Djan Madruga; Jorge Fernandes; Marcelo Jucá	Swimming	Men's 4 × 200 m freestyle relay	18 August 1983	
Silver	Ricardo Inokuchi	Table tennis	Men's singles		
Gold	Cláudio Kano; Ricardo Inokuchi	Table tennis	Men's doubles		
Bronze	Cláudio Kano; Sandra Noda	Table tennis	Mixed doubles		
Gold	Acassio da Cunha; Aristides Nascimento; Cláudio Kano; Maurício Kobayashi; Ricardo Inokuchi	Table tennis	Men's team		
Gold	Men's volleyball team: Amauri Ribeiro Antônio Carlos Ribeiro Bernard Rajzman Bernardo Rezende Domingos Maracanã Fernando Ávila Marcus Vinícius Freire Mario Xandó Netto Renan Dal Zotto Ronaldo de Macedo Rui Nascimento William Silva	Volleyball	Men's tournament	27 August 1983	

Medals by sport
Sport	1st place, gold medalist(s)	2nd place, silver medalist(s)	3rd place, bronze medalist(s)	Total
Athletics	4	3	3	10
Sailing	4	1	0	5
Swimming	2	5	1	8
Table tennis	2	1	1	4
Rowing	1	1	0	2
Volleyball	1	0	0	1
Judo	0	5	6	11
Shooting	0	2	2	4
Basketball	0	1	1	2
Football	0	1	0	1
Archery	0	0	3	3
Boxing	0	0	2	2
Equestrian	0	0	2	2
Gymnastics	0	0	1	1
Cycling	0	0	1	1
Total	14	20	23	57

== See also ==
- Brazil at the 1984 Summer Olympics
