= Swimming at the 1983 Pan American Games – Men's 1500 metre freestyle =

Men's 1500 metre freestyle at the 1983 Pan American Games
- Venue: -
- Dates: August 22 (preliminaries and finals)
- Competitors: from - nations

Medalists
Gold medal	Jeff Kostoff	United States
Silver medal	Marcelo Jucá	Brazil
Bronze medal	Carlos Scanavino	Uruguay

The men's 1500 metre freestyle competition of the swimming events at the 1983 Pan American Games took place on 22 August. The last Pan American Games champion was Brian Goodell of US.

This race consisted of thirty lengths of the pool, all lengths being in freestyle.

== Results ==
All times are in minutes and seconds.

KEY:	q	Fastest non-qualifiers	Q	Qualified	GR	Games record	NR	National record	PB	Personal best	SB	Seasonal best

=== Final ===
The final was held on August 22.

Rank	Name	Nationality	Time	Notes
1st place, gold medalist(s)	Jeff Kostoff	United States	15:30.67	
2nd place, silver medalist(s)	Marcelo Jucá	Brazil	15:33.01	
3rd place, bronze medalist(s)	Carlos Scanavino	Uruguay	15:36.07	NR
4	Mike O'Brien	United States	15:36.18	
5	Alejandro Lecot	Argentina	15:41.74	
6	Dave Shemilt	Canada	15:50.06	
7	Bruce Berger	Canada	15:53.82	
8	Roger Madruga	Brazil	16:26.91	
