= Swimming at the 1983 Pan American Games – Men's 400 metre individual medley =

Men's 400 metre individual medley at the 1983 Pan American Games
- Venue: -
- Dates: August 18 (preliminaries and finals)
- Competitors: from - nations

Medalists
Gold medal	Ricardo Prado	Brazil
Silver medal	Jeff Kostoff	United States
Bronze medal	Mike O'Brien	United States

The men's 400 metre individual medley competition of the swimming events at the 1983 Pan American Games took place on 18 August. The last Pan American Games champion was Jesse Vassallo of US.

This race consisted of eight lengths of the pool. The first two lengths were swum using the butterfly stroke, the second pair with the backstroke, the third pair of lengths in breaststroke, and the final two were freestyle.

== Results ==
All times are in minutes and seconds.

KEY:	q	Fastest non-qualifiers	Q	Qualified	GR	Games record	NR	National record	PB	Personal best	SB	Seasonal best

=== Final ===
The final was held on August 18.

Rank	Name	Nationality	Time	Notes
1st place, gold medalist(s)	Ricardo Prado	Brazil	4:21.43	GR
2nd place, silver medalist(s)	Jeff Kostoff	United States	4:27.99	
3rd place, bronze medalist(s)	Mike O'Brien	United States	4:30.45	
4	Peter Dobson	Canada	4:30.45	
5	Roger Madruga	Brazil	4:34.01	
6	Cam Reid	Canada	4:37.16	
7	Andrey Aguilar	Costa Rica	4:41.98	
8	Enrique Leite	Uruguay	4:47.72	
