= Swimming at the 1979 Pan American Games – Men's 1500 metre freestyle =

Men's 1500 metre freestyle at the 1979 Pan American Games
- Venue: Piscina Olimpica Del Escambron
- Dates: July 7 (preliminaries and finals)
- Competitors: from - nations

Medalists
Gold medal	Brian Goodell	United States
Silver medal	Djan Madruga	Brazil
Bronze medal	Bobby Hackett	United States

The Men's 1500m Freestyle competition of the swimming events at the 1979 Pan American Games took place on 7 July at the Piscina Olimpica Del Escambron in San Juan, Puerto Rico. The last Pan American Games champion was Bobby Hackett of US.

This race consisted of thirty lengths of the pool, all lengths being in freestyle.

== Results ==
All times are in minutes and seconds.

KEY:	q	Fastest non-qualifiers	Q	Qualified	GR	Games record	NR	National record	PB	Personal best	SB	Seasonal best

=== Heats ===
The first round was held on July 7.

Rank	Name	Nationality	Time	Notes
1	Peter Szmidt	Canada	15:56.05	Q
2	Djan Madruga	Brazil	15:56.06	Q
3	Diego Quiroga	Ecuador	16:03.73	Q
4	Alex Baumann	Canada	16:10.92	Q
5	Brian Goodell	United States	16:11.34	Q
6	Bobby Hackett	United States	16:11.50	Q
7	Alejandro Lecot	Argentina	16:13.26	Q
8	Scott Newkirk	U.S. Virgin Islands	16:21.45	Q
9	Tizoc Guemez	Mexico	16:24.01	
10	Filiberto Colon	Puerto Rico	16:24.22	NR
11	César Sánchez	Mexico	16:26.68	
12	Rafael Vidal	Venezuela	16:34.85	
13	Carlos Scanavino	Uruguay	16:53.42	NR
14	Jorge Martinez	Puerto Rico	16:58.49	
15	Oscar Moreno	El Salvador	17:00.75	NR
16	Roger Madruga	Brazil	17:23.53	
17	Jorge Sanchez	Panama	17:40.76	NR
18	Victor Masalles	Dominican Republic	18:32.65	NR

=== Final ===
The final was held on July 7.

Rank	Name	Nationality	Time	Notes
1st place, gold medalist(s)	Brian Goodell	United States	15:24.36	NR, GR
2nd place, silver medalist(s)	Djan Madruga	Brazil	15:41.74	
3rd place, bronze medalist(s)	Bobby Hackett	United States	15:46.83	
4	Peter Szmidt	Canada	15:56.91	
5	Diego Quiroga	Ecuador	16:02.34	NR
6	Alejandro Lecot	Argentina	16:04.63	NR
7	Scott Newkirk	U.S. Virgin Islands	16:08.36	NR
8	Alex Baumann	Canada	16:08.85	
