= Swimming at the 1979 Pan American Games – Men's 400 metre freestyle =

Men's 400 metre freestyle at the 1979 Pan American Games
- Venue: Piscina Olimpica Del Escambron
- Dates: July 5 (preliminaries and finals)
- Competitors: from - nations

Medalists
| Gold medal | Brian Goodell | United States |
| Silver medal | Djan Madruga | Brazil |
| Bronze medal | Peter Szmidt | Canada |

The men's 400 metre freestyle competition of the swimming events at the 1979 Pan American Games took place on 5 July at the Piscina Olimpica Del Escambron. The last Pan American Games champion was Douglas Northway of US.

This race consisted of eight lengths of the pool, with all eight being in the freestyle stroke.

== Results ==
All times are in minutes and seconds.

| KEY: | q | Fastest non-qualifiers | Q | Qualified | GR | Games record | NR | National record | PB | Personal best | SB | Seasonal best |

=== Heats ===
The first round was held on July 5.

| Rank | Name | Nationality | Time | Notes |
|---|---|---|---|---|
| 1 | Brian Goodell | United States | 3:58.72 | Q |
| 2 | Peter Szmidt | Canada | 3:58.78 | Q |
| 3 | Djan Madruga | Brazil | 4:00.83 | Q |
| 4 | Rob Bayliss | Canada | 4:00.84 | Q |
| 5 | David Larson | United States | 4:03.72 | Q |
| 6 | Diego Quiroga | Ecuador | 4:04.85 | Q |
| 7 | Scott Newkirk | U.S. Virgin Islands | 4:06.52 | Q |
| 8 | Jean François | Venezuela | 4:07.07 | Q, NR |
| 9 | Filiberto Colon | Puerto Rico | 4:07.24 | NR |
| 10 | César Sánchez | Mexico | 4:07.45 | NR |
| 11 | Jorge Martinez | Puerto Rico | 4:09.23 | |
| 12 | Alejandro Lecot | Argentina | 4:10.63 | |
| 13 | Alejandro Romo | Mexico | 4:12.13 | |
| 14 | Alberto Mestre | Venezuela | 4:13.78 | |
| 15 | Oscar Moreno | El Salvador | 4:18.12 | NR |
| 16 | Roger Madruga | Brazil | 4:22.65 | |
| 17 | Ruben Martinez | El Salvador | 4:24.46 | |
| 18 | Jorge Sanchez | Panama | 4:27.89 | NR |

=== Final ===
The final was held on July 5.

| Rank | Name | Nationality | Time | Notes |
|---|---|---|---|---|
| 1st place, gold medalist(s) | Brian Goodell | United States | 3:53.01 | NR, GR |
| 2nd place, silver medalist(s) | Djan Madruga | Brazil | 3:57.46 | |
| 3rd place, bronze medalist(s) | Peter Szmidt | Canada | 3:58.34 | |
| 4 | Rob Bayliss | Canada | 3:59.21 | |
| 5 | David Larson | United States | 4:00.07 | |
| 6 | Diego Quiroga | Ecuador | 4:02.86 | NR |
| 7 | Scott Newkirk | U.S. Virgin Islands | 4:06.52 | NR |
| 8 | Jean François | Venezuela | 4:12.20 | |
