= Swimming at the 1987 Pan American Games – Men's 4 × 100 metre freestyle relay =

Men's 4 × 100 metre freestyle relay at the 1987 Pan American Games
- Venue: Indiana University Natatorium
- Dates: August 13 (preliminaries and finals)
- Competitors: from - nations

Medalists
Gold medal	Jim Born, Scott McCadam, Paul Robinson and Todd Dudley	United States
Silver medal	-, -, - and -	Canada
Bronze medal	Jorge Fernandes, Cristiano Michelena, Cyro Delgado and Júlio César Rebolal	Brazil

The men's 4 × 100 metre freestyle relay competition of the swimming events at the 1987 Pan American Games took place on 13 August at the Indiana University Natatorium. The last Pan American Games champion was the United States.

This race consisted of eight lengths of the pool. Each of the four swimmers completed two lengths of the pool. The first swimmer had to touch the wall before the second could leave the starting block.

== Results ==
All times are in minutes and seconds.

KEY:	q	Fastest non-qualifiers	Q	Qualified	GR	Games record	NR	National record	PB	Personal best	SB	Seasonal best

=== Final ===
The final was held on August 13.

Rank	Name	Nationality	Time	Notes
1st place, gold medalist(s)	Jim Born (50.54); Scott McCadam (50.07); Paul Robinson (49.89); Todd Dudley (49.47)	United States	3:19.97	GR
2nd place, silver medalist(s)	- - - -	Canada	3:26.09	
3rd place, bronze medalist(s)	Jorge Fernandes; Cristiano Michelena; Cyro Delgado; Júlio César Rebolal	Brazil	3:27.11	
4	- - - -	Puerto Rico	3:30.89	
5	- - - -	Argentina	3:34.46	
6	- - - -	Cuba	3:35.44	
7	- - - -	Panama	3:38.70	
8	- - - -	U.S. Virgin Islands	3:51.19	
