= Swimming at the 1979 Pan American Games – Men's 400 metre individual medley =

Men's 400 metre individual medley at the 1979 Pan American Games
- Venue: Piscina Olimpica Del Escambron
- Dates: July 3 (preliminaries and finals)
- Competitors: from - nations

Medalists
Gold medal	Jesse Vassallo	United States
Silver medal	Bill Sawchuk	Canada
Bronze medal	Alex Baumann	Canada

The men's 400 metre individual medley competition of the swimming events at the 1979 Pan American Games took place on 3 July at the Piscina Olimpica Del Escambron. The last Pan American Games champion was Steve Furniss of the United States.

This race consisted of eight lengths of the pool. The first two lengths were swum using the butterfly stroke, the second pair with the backstroke, the third pair of lengths in breaststroke, and the final two were freestyle.

== Results ==
All times shown are in minutes and seconds.

KEY:	q	Fastest non-qualifiers	Q	Qualified	GR	Games record	NR	National record	PB	Personal best	SB	Seasonal best

=== Heats ===
The first round was held on July 3.

Rank	Name	Nationality	Time	Notes
1	Bill Sawchuk	Canada	4:33.97	Q
2	Jesse Vassallo	United States	4:34.14	Q
3	Alex Baumann	Canada	4:35.42	Q
4	Guillermo Zavala	Mexico	4:35.93	Q, NR
5	Glynn Perry	United States	4:38.32	Q
6	Andrey Aguilar	Costa Rica	4:41.43	Q
7	Jorge Varela	Mexico	4:41.52	Q
8	Ricardo Prado	Brazil	4:41.89	Q
9	Antonio Cerezo	Puerto Rico	4:44.31	
10	Pablo Restrepo	Colombia	4:45.64	
11	Scott Newkirk	U.S. Virgin Islands	4:46.38	NR
12	Roger Madruga	Brazil	4:49.88	
13	Jean François	Venezuela	4:50.11	
14	Emilio Abreu	Paraguay	4:52.85	
15	Andrew Philipps	Jamaica	4:55.55	
16	Enrique Leite	Uruguay	4:59.59	
17	Jorge Sanchez	Panama	5:03.28	NR
18	Oscar Moreno	El Salvador	5:11.75	
19	Victor Masalles	Dominican Republic	5:25.56	

=== Final ===
The final was held on July 3.

Rank	Name	Nationality	Time	Notes
1st place, gold medalist(s)	Jesse Vassallo	United States	4:21.63	NR, GR
2nd place, silver medalist(s)	Bill Sawchuk	Canada	4:30.21	
3rd place, bronze medalist(s)	Alex Baumann	Canada	4:32.42	
4	Glynn Perry	United States	4:32.53	
5	Jorge Varela	Mexico	4:39.11	
6	Andrey Aguilar	Costa Rica	4:39.44	NR
7	Ricardo Prado	Brazil	4:41.16	
8	Guillermo Zavala	Mexico	DQ	
