= Swimming at the 1983 Pan American Games – Men's 200 metre butterfly =

Men's 200 metre butterfly at the 1983 Pan American Games
- Venue: -
- Dates: August 21 (preliminaries and finals)
- Competitors: from - nations

Medalists
Gold medal	Craig Beardsley	United States
Silver medal	Ricardo Prado	Brazil
Bronze medal	Rafael Vidal	Venezuela

The men's 200 metre butterfly competition of the swimming events at the 1983 Pan American Games took place on 21 August. The last Pan American Games champion was Craig Beardsley of the United States.

This race consisted of four lengths of the pool, all lengths being in butterfly stroke.

== Results ==
All times are in minutes and seconds.

KEY:	q	Fastest non-qualifiers	Q	Qualified	GR	Games record	NR	National record	PB	Personal best	SB	Seasonal best

=== Final ===
The final was held on August 21.

Rank	Name	Nationality	Time	Notes
1st place, gold medalist(s)	Craig Beardsley	United States	1:58.85	GR
2nd place, silver medalist(s)	Ricardo Prado	Brazil	1:59.00	SA
3rd place, bronze medalist(s)	Rafael Vidal	Venezuela	1:59.17	NR
4	Filiberto Colon	Puerto Rico	2:01.35	
5	Tom Ponting	Canada	2:01.48	
6	Pablo Morales	United States	2:01.88	
7	Lance Schroeder	Canada	2:03.19	
8	Andrey Aguilar	Costa Rica	2:07.26	
