= Swimming at the 1987 Pan American Games – Men's 200 metre individual medley =

Men's 200 metre individual medley at the 1987 Pan American Games
- Venue: Indiana University Natatorium
- Dates: August 15 (preliminaries and finals)
- Competitors: from - nations

Medalists
Gold medal	Bill Stapleton	United States
Silver medal	Paul Wallace	United States
Bronze medal	Ricardo Prado	Brazil

The men's 200 metre individual medley competition of the swimming events at the 1987 Pan American Games took place on 15 August at the Indiana University Natatorium. The last Pan American Games champion was Ricardo Prado of Brazil.

This race consisted of four lengths of the pool, one each in backstroke, breaststroke, butterfly and freestyle swimming.

== Results ==
All times are in minutes and seconds.

KEY:	q	Fastest non-qualifiers	Q	Qualified	GR	Games record	NR	National record	PB	Personal best	SB	Seasonal best

=== Final ===
The final was held on August 15.

Rank	Name	Nationality	Time	Notes
1st place, gold medalist(s)	Bill Stapleton	United States	2:03.58	
2nd place, silver medalist(s)	Paul Wallace	United States	2:04.92	
3rd place, bronze medalist(s)	Ricardo Prado	Brazil	2:04.94	
4	Darren Ward	Canada	2:06.27	
5	Manuel Guzmán	Puerto Rico	2:06.40	
6	Rodrigo González	Mexico	2:07.95	
7	Javier Careaga	Mexico	2:09.00	
8	Júlio César Rebolal	Brazil	2:09.02	
