= Swimming at the 1987 Pan American Games – Men's 400 metre freestyle =

Men's 400 metre freestyle at the 1987 Pan American Games
- Venue: Indiana University Natatorium
- Dates: August 13 (preliminaries and finals)
- Competitors: from - nations

Medalists
Gold medal	Paul Robinson	United States
Silver medal	Cristiano Michelena	Brazil
Bronze medal	Scott Brackett	United States

The men's 400 metre freestyle competition of the swimming events at the 1987 Pan American Games took place on 13 August at the Indiana University Natatorium. The last Pan American Games champion was Bruce Hayes of US.

This race consisted of eight lengths of the pool, with all eight being in the freestyle stroke.

== Results ==
All times are in minutes and seconds.

KEY:	q	Fastest non-qualifiers	Q	Qualified	GR	Games record	NR	National record	PB	Personal best	SB	Seasonal best

=== Final ===
The final was held on August 13.

Rank	Name	Nationality	Time	Notes
1st place, gold medalist(s)	Paul Robinson	United States	3:54.44	
2nd place, silver medalist(s)	Cristiano Michelena	Brazil	3:55.37	
3rd place, bronze medalist(s)	Scott Brackett	United States	3:55.64	
4	Chris Chalmers	Canada	3:55.70	
5	Gary Vandermeulen	Canada	3:57.35	
6	Carlos Scanavino	Uruguay	3:59.36	
7	Luis Moreli	Puerto Rico	4:02.66	
8	Richard Patino	Colombia	4:04.78	
