= Swimming at the 1983 Pan American Games – Men's 400 metre freestyle =

Men's 400 metre freestyle at the 1983 Pan American Games
- Venue: -
- Dates: August 20 (preliminaries and finals)
- Competitors: from - nations

Medalists
Gold medal	Bruce Hayes	United States
Silver medal	Matt Cetlinski	United States
Bronze medal	Marcelo Jucá	Brazil

The men's 400 metre freestyle competition of the swimming events at the 1983 Pan American Games took place on 20 August. The last Pan American Games champion was Brian Goodell of US.

This race consisted of eight lengths of the pool, with all eight being in the freestyle stroke.

== Results ==
All times are in minutes and seconds.

KEY:	q	Fastest non-qualifiers	Q	Qualified	GR	Games record	NR	National record	PB	Personal best	SB	Seasonal best

=== Final ===
The final was held on August 20.

Rank	Name	Nationality	Time	Notes
1st place, gold medalist(s)	Bruce Hayes	United States	3:53.17	
2nd place, silver medalist(s)	Matt Cetlinski	United States	3:53.31	
3rd place, bronze medalist(s)	Marcelo Jucá	Brazil	3:55.66	
4	Rafael Vidal	Venezuela	3:56.19	NR
5	Carlos Scanavino	Uruguay	3:58.67	NR
6	Dave Shemilt	Canada	4:01.56	
7	Peter Szmidt	Canada	4:02.61	
8	Alejandro Lecot	Argentina	4:08.20	
