= Swimming at the 1979 Pan American Games – Men's 200 metre individual medley =

Men's 200 metre individual medley at the 1979 Pan American Games
- Venue: Piscina Olimpica Del Escambron
- Dates: July 6 (preliminaries and finals)
- Competitors: from - nations

Medalists
| Gold medal | Jesse Vassallo | United States |
| Silver medal | Graham Smith | Canada |
| Bronze medal | Scott Spann | United States |

The men's 200 metre individual medley competition of the swimming events at the 1979 Pan American Games took place on 6 July at the Piscina Olimpica Del Escambron. The last Pan American Games champion was Steve Furniss of US.

This race consisted of four lengths of the pool, one each in backstroke, breaststroke, butterfly and freestyle swimming.

== Results ==
All times are in minutes and seconds.

| KEY: | q | Fastest non-qualifiers | Q | Qualified | GR | Games record | NR | National record | PB | Personal best | SB | Seasonal best |

=== Heats ===
The first round was held on July 6.

| Rank | Name | Nationality | Time | Notes |
|---|---|---|---|---|
| 1 | Jesse Vassallo | United States | 2:07.90 | Q |
| 2 | Graham Smith | Canada | 2:08.99 | Q |
| 3 | Bill Sawchuk | Canada | 2:09.67 | Q |
| 4 | Scott Spann | United States | 2:10.16 | Q |
| 5 | Helmut Levy | Colombia | 2:10.39 | Q |
| 6 | Jorge Varela | Mexico | 2:10.60 | Q |
| 7 | Andrey Aguilar | Costa Rica | 2:10.78 | Q, NR |
| 8 | Ricardo Prado | Brazil | 2:13.93 | Q |
| 9 | Pablo Restrepo | Colombia | 2:14.15 | |
| 10 | José de Jesus | Puerto Rico | 2:14.47 | |
| 11 | David Lindquist | U.S. Virgin Islands | 2:14.73 | NR |
| 12 | Emilio Abreu | Paraguay | 2:15.16 | NR |
| 13 | Glen Sochasky | Venezuela | 2:16.02 | NR |
| 14 | Antonio Cerezo | Puerto Rico | 2:16.51 | |
| 15 | Andrew Philipps | Jamaica | 2:16.68 | |
| 16 | Roberto Ledesma | Ecuador | 2:21.50 | |
| 17 | Enrique Leite | Uruguay | 2:21.67 | |
| 18 | Donaldo Clough | Dominican Republic | 2:34.30 | |

=== Final ===
The final was held on July 6.

| Rank | Name | Nationality | Time | Notes |
|---|---|---|---|---|
| 1st place, gold medalist(s) | Jesse Vassallo | United States | 2:03.29 | WR |
| 2nd place, silver medalist(s) | Graham Smith | Canada | 2:05.86 | |
| 3rd place, bronze medalist(s) | Scott Spann | United States | 2:06.29 | |
| 4 | Bill Sawchuk | Canada | 2:07.51 | |
| 5 | Helmut Levy | Colombia | 2:08.76 | NR |
| 6 | Jorge Varela | Mexico | 2:09.63 | NR |
| 7 | Andrey Aguilar | Costa Rica | 2:11.51 | NR |
| 8 | Ricardo Prado | Brazil | 2:14.89 | |
