= Swimming at the 1983 Pan American Games – Men's 200 metre individual medley =

Men's 200 metre individual medley at the 1983 Pan American Games
- Venue: -
- Dates: August 22 (preliminaries and finals)
- Competitors: from - nations

Medalists
Gold medal	Ricardo Prado	Brazil
Silver medal	Bill Barrett	United States
Bronze medal	Steve Lundquist	United States

The men's 200 metre individual medley competition of the swimming events at the 1983 Pan American Games took place on 22 August. The last Pan American Games champion was Jesse Vassallo of US.

This race consisted of four lengths of the pool, one each in backstroke, breaststroke, butterfly and freestyle swimming.

== Results ==
All times are in minutes and seconds.

KEY:	q	Fastest non-qualifiers	Q	Qualified	GR	Games record	NR	National record	PB	Personal best	SB	Seasonal best

=== Final ===
The final was held on August 22.

Rank	Name	Nationality	Time	Notes
1st place, gold medalist(s)	Ricardo Prado	Brazil	2:04.51	
2nd place, silver medalist(s)	Bill Barrett	United States	2:04.91	
3rd place, bronze medalist(s)	Steve Lundquist	United States	2:06.37	
4	Cam Reid	Canada	2:08.05	
5	Pablo Restrepo	Colombia	2:09.41	
6	Andrey Aguilar	Costa Rica	2:11.93	
7	Peter Dobson	Canada	2:12.20	
8	Ivan Ortiz	Puerto Rico	2:15.64	
