= Swimming at the 1983 Pan American Games – Men's 200 metre backstroke =

Men's 200 metre backstroke at the 1983 Pan American Games
- Venue: -
- Dates: August 19 (preliminaries and finals)
- Competitors: from - nations

Medalists
Gold medal	Rick Carey	United States
Silver medal	Ricardo Prado	Brazil
Bronze medal	Mike West	Canada

The men's 200 metre backstroke competition of the swimming events at the 1983 Pan American Games took place on 19 August. The last Pan American Games champion was Peter Rocca of US.

This race consisted of four lengths of the pool, all in backstroke.

== Results ==
All times are in minutes and seconds.

KEY:	q	Fastest non-qualifiers	Q	Qualified	GR	Games record	NR	National record	PB	Personal best	SB	Seasonal best

=== Final ===
The final was held on August 19.

Rank	Name	Nationality	Time	Notes
1st place, gold medalist(s)	Rick Carey	United States	1:59.34	GR
2nd place, silver medalist(s)	Ricardo Prado	Brazil	2:02.85	SA
3rd place, bronze medalist(s)	Mike West	Canada	2:03.11	
4	Cameron Henning	Canada	2:03.33	
5	Richey Hughey	United States	2:06.67	
6	Giovanni Frigo	Venezuela	2:07.81	NR
7	Jorge Macario	Venezuela	2:15.60	
8	Allan Marsh	Jamaica	2:16.56	
