= Football at the 1987 Pan American Games =

Football – Men's tournament at the 1987 Pan American Games
- Venue: Kuntz Soccer Center
- Dates: 9–21 August

Medalists
Gold medal	Brazil
Silver medal	Chile
Bronze medal	Argentina

The tenth edition of the Men's Football Tournament at the Pan American Games was held at the William Kuntz Soccer Center in Indianapolis, United States from August 9 to August 21, 1987. Twelve teams competed, with title defender Uruguay missing. After the preliminary round there was a knock-out stage.

== Participating teams ==
- Argentina
- Brazil
- Canada
- Chile
- Colombia
- Cuba
- El Salvador
- Guatemala
- Mexico
- Paraguay
- Trinidad and Tobago
- United States

== Preliminary round ==
=== Group A ===
Rank	Team	Pts	Pld	W	D	L	GF	GA
1	Argentina	6	3	3	0	0	9	0
2	United States	3	3	1	1	1	3	3
3	El Salvador	3	3	1	1	1	1	1
4	Trinidad and Tobago	0	3	0	0	3	1	10

August 9

Argentina	1–0	El Salvador
H. Gutiérrez 5'

Kuntz Memorial Soccer Stadium
Referee: Adriano Brunetti (CAN)
August 9

United States	3–1	Trinidad and Tobago
Hantak 1', 40'; Klopas 77'		P. Jones 22'

Kuntz Memorial Soccer Stadium
Referee: Hernán Silva (CHI)
August 12

Argentina	6–0	Trinidad and Tobago
Dertycia 11', 44'; Fabbri 40'; Dezotti 77', 87'; H. Gutiérrez 89'

Kuntz Memorial Soccer Stadium
Referee: Rodolfo Martínez Mejía (HON)
August 12

United States	0–0	El Salvador

Kuntz Memorial Soccer Stadium
Referee: Arnaldo Cezar Coelho (BRA)
August 15

Argentina	2–0	United States
Dertycia 87'; Dezotti 90+'

Kuntz Memorial Soccer Stadium
Referee: Jesús Díaz (COL)
August 15

Trinidad and Tobago	0–1	El Salvador
		Perla 27'

Kuntz Memorial Soccer Stadium
Referee: Carlos Maciel (PAR)

=== Group B ===
Rank	Team	Pts	Pld	W	D	L	GF	GA
1	Brazil	5	3	2	1	0	7	2
2	Chile	4	3	1	2	0	3	2
3	Cuba	2	3	1	0	2	3	4
4	Canada	1	3	0	1	2	3	8

August 10

Brazil	4–1	Canada
Evair 12'; Nelsinho 36'; Tony 67' (o.g.); João Paulo 69'		Wilkinson 41'

Kuntz Memorial Soccer Stadium
Referee: Carlos Montalván (PER)
August 10

Chile	1–0	Cuba
Perez 55'

Kuntz Memorial Soccer Stadium
Referee: Juan Carlos Loustau (ARG)
August 13

Brazil	3–1	Cuba
Careca 14'; André Cruz 69'; Washington 85'		Rivero 87'

Kuntz Memorial Soccer Stadium
Referee: Esteban Garza (MEX)
August 13

Chile	2–2	Canada
Perez 27'; Tamayo 64'		Domazetis 55' (pen.), 86'

Kuntz Memorial Soccer Stadium
Referee: Juan Pablo Escobar (GUA)
August 16

Brazil	0–0	Chile

Kuntz Memorial Soccer Stadium
Referee: Rodolfo Martínez Mejía (HON)
August 16

Cuba	2–0	Canada
C. Gonzalez 7'; Maya 37'

Kuntz Memorial Soccer Stadium
Referee: José Leonidas Rogel (SLV)

=== Group C ===
Rank	Team	Pts	Pld	W	D	L	GF	GA
1	Mexico	6	3	3	0	0	10	1
2	Guatemala	3	3	1	1	1	3	2
3	Paraguay	2	3	0	2	1	1	8
4	Colombia	1	3	0	1	2	1	4

August 9

Mexico	1–0	Guatemala
Claverí 21' (o.g.)

Kuntz Memorial Soccer Stadium
Referee: Jesús Díaz (COL)
August 9

Colombia	0–0	Paraguay

Kuntz Memorial Soccer Stadium
Referee: Angelo Bratsis (USA)
August 12

Mexico	7–0	Paraguay
J. Hernández 15', 38', 75'; Javier Cruz 16', 25'; Félix Cruz 69'; Galindo 71'

Kuntz Memorial Soccer Stadium
Referee: Juan Carlos Loustau (ARG)
August 12

Guatemala	2–0	Colombia
Funes 26'; E. Westphal 85'

Kuntz Memorial Soccer Stadium
Referee: Hernán Silva (CHI)
August 15

Mexico	2–1	Colombia
Lira 19'; Quirarte 72' (pen.)		W. Rodriguez 41'

Kuntz Memorial Soccer Stadium
Referee: Richard Ramcharan (TTO)
August 15

Guatemala	1–1	Paraguay
Vargas 7'		Palacios 28'

Kuntz Memorial Soccer Stadium
Referee: Oswaldo Brea (CUB)

== Final round ==
=== Bracket ===
Semi-finals
August 18 – Indianapolis
Chile	3
Argentina	2
August 18 – Indianapolis
Brazil	1
Mexico	0

Final
August 21 – Indianapolis
Brazil	2
Chile	0
Third place
August 20 – Indianapolis
Argentina	0 (5)
Mexico	0 (4)

=== Semi finals ===
August 18

Chile	3–2	Argentina
Pino 3'; Pérez 36'; A. González 44'	Report	H. Gutiérrez 21'; Dertycia 66'

Kuntz Memorial Soccer Stadium
Referee: Jesús Díaz (COL)

August 18

Brazil	1–0 (a.e.t.)	Mexico
Evair 109'	Report

Kuntz Memorial Soccer Stadium, Indianapolis
Referee: Angelo Bratsis (USA)

=== Bronze medal match ===
August 20

Argentina	0–0 (a.e.t.)	Mexico
	Report
Penalties
Basualdo (penalty scored); O. Acosta (penalty scored); Fabbri (penalty scored); Fantaguzzi (penalty scored); Marchesini (penalty scored)	5–4	Quirarte (penalty scored); E. de la Torre (penalty scored); J. M. de la Torre (penalty scored); Muñoz (penalty scored); Félix Cruz (penalty missed)

Kuntz Soccer Center, Indianapolis
Referee: Carlos Maciel (PAR)

=== Gold Medal match ===
August 21

Brazil	2–0 (a.e.t.)	Chile
Washington 105'; Evair 115'	Report

Kuntz Soccer Center, Indianapolis
Referee: Rodolfo Martínez Mejía (HON)

1987 Pan American Games winners

Brazil
Fourth title

== Medalists ==
Event	Gold	Silver	Bronze
Men's tournament	Brazil Luís Carlos; Valdo; Pita; André Cruz; Ademir; Nelsinho; João Paulo; Edu Marangon; Douglas; Pereira; Raí; Evair; Geraldão; Ricardo Gomes; Ricardo Rocha; Washington; Careca; Claudio Taffarel; Carlos Alberto Silva (coach)	Chile Miguel Ardiman; Luis Ceballos; Nelson Enríquez; Claudio Figueroa; Eduardo Fournier; Héctor Francino; Osvaldo Gómez; Aníbal González; Juan González; Francisco Hörmann; Fernando Medina; Jorge Pérez; Germán Pino; René Pinto; Marco Tamayo; Claudio Tello; Patricio Toledo; Iván Zamorano; Eugenio Jara (coach)	Argentina Gustavo Acosta; Oscar Acosta; Mauro Airez; Favio Almirón; Jorge Bartero; Fabián Basualdo; Fabián Cancelarich; Oscar Dertycia; Gustavo Dezotti; Néstor Fabbri; José Fantaguzzi; Blas Giunta; Humberto Gutiérrez; Carlos Mac Allister; Víctor Marchesini; Alejandro Russo; Darío Siviski; Jorge Theiler; Carlos Pachamé (coach)

== Goalscorers ==
There were 53 goals scored in 22 matches, for an average of 2.41 goals per match.

4 goals

- (Argentina) Oscar Dertycia

3 goals

- (Argentina) Gustavo Dezotti
- (Argentina) Humberto Gutiérrez
- (Brazil) Evair
- (Chile) Jorge Pérez
- (Mexico) Juan Hernández

2 goals

- (Brazil) Washington
- (Canada) William Domazetis
- (Mexico) Francisco Javier Cruz
- (United States) Ted Hantak

1 goal

- (Argentina) Néstor Fabbri
- (Brazil) André Cruz
- (Brazil) Careca
- (Brazil) João Paulo
- (Brazil) Nelsinho
- (Canada) Neil Wilkinson
- (Chile) Aníbal González
- (Chile) Germán Pino
- (Chile) Marco Tamayo
- (Colombia) Wilson Manuel Rodriguez
- (Cuba) Carlos Gonzalez
- (Cuba) Jorge Maya
- (Cuba) Jorge Rivero
- (El Salvador) Luis Mauricio Perla
- (Guatemala) Jorge Aníbal Vargas
- (Guatemala) Juan Manuel Funes
- (Guatemala) Edwin Westphal
- (Mexico) Félix Cruz
- (Mexico) Benjamín Galindo
- (Mexico) Sergio Lira
- (Mexico) Fernando Quirarte
- (Paraguay) Eumelio Palacios
- (Trinidad and Tobago) Philibert Jones
- (United States) Frank Klopas

Source: RSSSF
