= Swimming at the 1979 Pan American Games – Men's 4 × 100 metre freestyle relay =

Men's 4 × 100 metre freestyle relay at the 1979 Pan American Games
- Venue: Piscina Olimpica Del Escambron
- Dates: July 3 (preliminaries and finals)
- Competitors: from - nations

Medalists
| Gold medal | Rowdy Gaines, Jack Babashoff, John Newton and David McCagg | United States |
| Silver medal | Graham Welbourn, Alan Swanston, Bill Sawchuk and Peter Szmidt | Canada |
| Bronze medal | Djan Madruga, Cyro Delgado, Rômulo Arantes and Jorge Fernandes | Brazil |

The men's 4 × 100 metre freestyle relay competition of the swimming events at the 1979 Pan American Games took place on 3 July at the Piscina Olimpica Del Escambron. The last Pan American Games champion was the United States.

This race consisted of eight lengths of the pool. Each of the four swimmers completed two lengths of the pool. The first swimmer had to touch the wall before the second could leave the starting block.

== Results ==
All times shown are in minutes and seconds.

| KEY: | q | Fastest non-qualifiers | Q | Qualified | GR | Games record | NR | National record | PB | Personal best | SB | Seasonal best |

=== Heats ===
The first round was held on July 3.

| Rank | Name | Nationality | Time | Notes |
|---|---|---|---|---|
| 1 | - - - - | Canada | 3:29.86 | Q |
| 2 | - - - - | Brazil | 3:33.60 | Q |
| 3 | - - - - | United States | 3:34.21 | Q |
| 4 | - - - - | Puerto Rico | 3:37.81 | Q |
| 5 | - - - - | Mexico | 3:38.25 | Q |
| 6 | - - - - | Venezuela | 3:43.39 | Q |
| 7 | - - - - | Argentina | 3:45.70 | Q |
| 8 | - - - - | Ecuador | 3:47.86 | Q |
| 9 | - - - - | U.S. Virgin Islands | 3:49.13 | |
| 10 | - - - - | Dominican Republic | 3:54.77 | |

=== Final ===
The final was held on July 3.

| Rank | Name | Nationality | Time | Notes |
|---|---|---|---|---|
| 1st place, gold medalist(s) | Rowdy Gaines (50.41) NR, GR; Jack Babashoff (51.26); John Newton (50.71); David McCagg (51.33) | United States | 3:23.71 | NR, GR |
| 2nd place, silver medalist(s) | Graham Welbourn (52.96); Alan Swanston (51.92); Bill Sawchuk (52.45); Peter Szmidt (52.31) | Canada | 3:29.64 | |
| 3rd place, bronze medalist(s) | Djan Madruga (53.38); Cyro Delgado (52.52); Rômulo Arantes (52.51); Jorge Fernandes (52.45) | Brazil | 3:30.86 | SA |
| 4 | Carlos Berrocal (53.82); Filiberto Colon (54.23); Fernando Cañales (50.46); Jorge Martinez (54.24) | Puerto Rico | 3:32.75 | NR |
| 5 | Oscar González (54.35); Alfredo Romo (54.24); César Sánchez (55.33); Richard Sasser (53.42) | Mexico | 3:37.34 | NR |
| 6 | - - - - | Venezuela | 3:42.33 | NR |
| 7 | - - - - | Argentina | 3:43.46 | |
| 8 | - - - - | Ecuador | 3:45.34 | |
