= Swimming at the 1984 Summer Olympics – Men's 400 metre individual medley =

Men's 400 metre individual medley at the Games of the XXIII Olympiad
- Venue: McDonald's Olympic Swim Stadium
- Date: 30 July 1984 (heats & final)
- Competitors: 24 from 20 nations
- Winning time: 4:17.41 WR

Medalists
1st place, gold medalist(s)		Alex Baumann	Canada
2nd place, silver medalist(s)		Ricardo Prado	Brazil
3rd place, bronze medalist(s)		Rob Woodhouse	Australia

The final of the men's 400 metre individual medley event at the 1984 Summer Olympics was held in the McDonald's Olympic Swim Stadium in Los Angeles, California, on July 30, 1984. 24 athletes participated in the heats, with the fastest eight qualifying for the final.

== Records ==
Prior to this competition, the existing world and Olympic records were as follows.

World record	Alex Baumann (CAN)	4:17.53	Etobicoke, Canada	17 June 1984
Olympic record	Aleksandr Sidorenko (URS)	4:22.89	Moscow, Soviet Union	27 July 1980

The following records were established during the competition:

Date	Round	Name	Nation	Time	Record
30 July	Heat 3	Alex Baumann	Canada	4:22.46	OR
30 July	Final A	Alex Baumann	Canada	4:17.41	WR

== Results ==
=== Heats ===
Rule: The eight fastest swimmers advance to final A (Q), while the next eight to final B (q).

Rank	Heat	Lane	Name	Nationality	Time	Notes
1	3	4	Alex Baumann	Canada	4:22.46	Q, OR
2	3	5	Jeff Kostoff	United States	4:22.55	Q
3	1	4	Giovanni Franceschi	Italy	4:23.03	Q
4	2	4	Ricardo Prado	Brazil	4:23.31	Q
5	1	5	Maurizio Divano	Italy	4:23.61	Q
6	2	5	Jesse Vassallo	United States	4:23.82	Q
7	3	3	Rob Woodhouse	Australia	4:24.85	Q, OC
8	3	6	Stephen Poulter	Great Britain	4:25.38	Q, NR
9	2	3	Ralf Diegel	West Germany	4:28.10	q
10	2	6	Arne Borgstrøm	Norway	4:28.37	q
11	2	7	Andrew Phillips	Jamaica	4:29.43	q, NR
12	1	3	Peter Dobson	Canada	4:29.61	q
13	1	2	Shinji Ito	Japan	4:30.52	q
14	1	6	Stuart Willmott	Great Britain	4:32.90	q
15	2	2	Anders Peterson	Sweden	4:32.93	q
16	3	7	Yoram Kochavy	Israel	4:35.70	q, NR
17	1	7	Scott Newkirk	Virgin Islands	4:48.15	
18	2	1	Jairulla Jaitulla	Philippines	4:51.24	
19	3	1	Harry Wozniak	Barbados	4:53.87	
20	1	1	Ng Wing Hon	Hong Kong	4:58.98	
21	2	8	Julian Bolling	Sri Lanka	5:02.88	
22	3	8	Wu Ming Hsun	Hong Kong	5:02.94	
23	1	8	Juan José Piro	Honduras	5:15.68	
	3	2	Rafael Escalas	Spain	DNS	

=== Finals ===
==== Final B ====
Rank	Lane	Name	Nationality	Time	Notes
9	1	Anders Peterson	Sweden	4:27.95	NR
10	3	Andrew Phillips	Jamaica	4:27.98	NR
11	5	Arne Borgstrøm	Norway	4:28.20	
12	4	Ralf Diegel	West Germany	4:28.94	
13	2	Shinji Ito	Japan	4:29.76	AS
14	6	Peter Dobson	Canada	4:30.09	
15	7	Stuart Willmott	Great Britain	4:31.10	
16	8	Yoram Kochavy	Israel	4:40.00	

==== Final A ====
Rank	Lane	Name	Nationality	Time	Notes
1st place, gold medalist(s)	4	Alex Baumann	Canada	4:17.41	WR
2nd place, silver medalist(s)	6	Ricardo Prado	Brazil	4:18.45	SA
3rd place, bronze medalist(s)	1	Rob Woodhouse	Australia	4:20.50	OC
4	7	Jesse Vassallo	United States	4:21.46	
5	2	Maurizio Divano	Italy	4:22.76	
6	5	Jeff Kostoff	United States	4:23.28	
7	8	Stephen Poulter	Great Britain	4:25.80	
8	3	Giovanni Franceschi	Italy	4:26.05	
