= Madruga (surname) =

Madruga is a surname of Portuguese origin. Notable people with the surname include:

- Alberto Madruga da Costa (born 1940), Azorean politician
- Djan Madruga (born 1958), Brazilian former swimmer
- Ivanna Madruga (born 1961), Argentine former tennis player
- Núria Madruga (born 1980), Portuguese actress and model
- Pedro Madruga (c. 1430 – 1486), Count of Caminha
- Roger Madruga (born 1964), Brazilian former swimmer
- Teresa Madruga (born 1953), Portuguese actress

== Fiction ==
- Don Ramón, character from the Mexican sitcom El Chavo del Ocho known in Brazil and Portugal as Seu Madruga
