= Swimming at the 1983 Pan American Games – Men's 4 × 100 metre freestyle relay =

Men's 4 × 100 metre freestyle relay at the 1983 Pan American Games
- Venue: -
- Dates: August 20 (preliminaries and finals)
- Competitors: from - nations

Medalists
Gold medal	Robin Leamy, Matt Gribble, Chris Cavanaugh and Rowdy Gaines	United States
Silver medal	Cyro Delgado, Djan Madruga, Jorge Fernandes and Ronald Menezes	Brazil
Bronze medal	-,-,-,-	Venezuela

The men's 4 × 100 metre freestyle relay competition of the swimming events at the 1983 Pan American Games took place on 20 August. The last Pan American Games champion was the United States.

This race consisted of eight lengths of the pool. Each of the four swimmers completed two lengths of the pool. The first swimmer had to touch the wall before the second could leave the starting block.

== Results ==
All times are in minutes and seconds.

KEY:	q	Fastest non-qualifiers	Q	Qualified	GR	Games record	NR	National record	PB	Personal best	SB	Seasonal best

=== Final ===
The final was held on August 20.

Rank	Name	Nationality	Time	Notes
1st place, gold medalist(s)	Robin Leamy (50.65); Matt Gribble (50.71); Chris Cavanaugh (50.24); Rowdy Gaines (49.81)	United States	3:21.41	GR
2nd place, silver medalist(s)	Cyro Delgado; Djan Madruga; Jorge Fernandes; Ronald Menezes	Brazil	3:27.59	SA
3rd place, bronze medalist(s)	- - - -	Venezuela	3:29.06	NR
4	- - - -	Canada	3:29.42	
5	- - - -	Puerto Rico	3:29.72	NR
6	- - - -	Argentina	3:39.98	
7	- - - -	Cuba	3:41.79	NR
8	- - - -	Suriname	3:51.21	NR
