= Swimming at the 1979 Pan American Games – Men's 200 metre butterfly =

Men's 200 metre butterfly at the 1979 Pan American Games
- Venue: Piscina Olimpica Del Escambron
- Dates: July 5 (preliminaries and finals)
- Competitors: from - nations

Medalists
Gold medal	Craig Beardsley	United States
Silver medal	George Nagy	Canada
Bronze medal	Bill Sawchuk	Canada

The men's 200 metre butterfly competition of the swimming events at the 1979 Pan American Games took place on July 5 at the Piscina Olimpica Del Escambron. The last Pan American Games champion was Greg Jagenburg of US.

This race consisted of four lengths of the pool, all lengths being in butterfly stroke.

== Results ==
All times are in minutes and seconds.

KEY:	q	Fastest non-qualifiers	Q	Qualified	GR	Games record	NR	National record	PB	Personal best	SB	Seasonal best

=== Heats ===
The first round was held on July 5.

Rank	Name	Nationality	Time	Notes
1	Craig Beardsley	United States	2:05.38	Q
2	George Nagy	Canada	2:05.66	Q
3	Bill Sawchuk	Canada	2:06.26	Q
4	Glynn Perry	United States	2:06.44	Q
5	Jorge Jaramillo	Colombia	2:06.86	Q
6	Carlos Fontoura	Brazil	2:07.56	Q
7	Filiberto Colon	Puerto Rico	2:07.99	Q
8	Rafael Vidal	Venezuela	2:08.35	Q
9	Bernardo Lesser	Mexico	2:09.31	NR
10	Victor López	Puerto Rico	2:09.86	
11	David Lindquist	U.S. Virgin Islands	2:12.08	NR
12	Caio Filardi	Brazil	2:12.14	
13	Claudio Lutotovich	Argentina	2:16.49	
14	Enrique Leite	Uruguay	2:16.97	
15	Miguel Oqueli	El Salvador	2:17.96	NR
16	Roberto Ledesma	Ecuador	2:22.33	
17	Donaldo Clough	Dominican Republic	2:22.86	
18	Víctor Masalles	Dominican Republic	2:28.11	

=== Final ===
The final was held on July 5.

Rank	Name	Nationality	Time	Notes
1st place, gold medalist(s)	Craig Beardsley	United States	2:00.49	NR, GR
2nd place, silver medalist(s)	George Nagy	Canada	2:02.15	
3rd place, bronze medalist(s)	Bill Sawchuk	Canada	2:02.93	
4	Glynn Perry	United States	2:03.84	
5	Filiberto Colon	Puerto Rico	2:06.45	NR
6	Carlos Fontoura	Brazil	2:06.50	
7	Jorge Jaramillo	Colombia	2:06.79	
8	Rafael Vidal	Venezuela	2:06.86	
