= Patricio Toledo =

Chilean footballer (born 1962)

Personal information
- Full name: Patricio Armando Toledo Toledo
- Date of birth: July 14, 1962 (age 64)
- Place of birth: Santiago, Chile
- Height: 1.84 m (6 ft 0 in)
- Position: Goalkeeper

Youth career
- Domingo Toro Herrera
- Triunfador Lonquén
- Universidad Católica

Senior career*
Years	Team	Apps	(Gls)
1982–1996	Universidad Católica	451	(0)
1987	→ Everton (loan)	15	(0)
1988	→ Unión Española (loan)	12	(0)
1997	Deportes Temuco	28	(0)
1998	Santiago Wanderers	17	(0)
1999	Coquimbo Unido	10	(0)

International career
1984	Chile Olympic		
1984	Chile U23		
1987	Chile Pre-Olympic		
1987	Chile B		
1991–1994	Chile	19	(0)

Managerial career
- 2005–2019: Audax Italiano (gk coach)
- 2020–2022: Palestino U20 (gk coach)
Medal record
Men's football
Representing Chile
Pan American Games
Silver medal – second place	1987 Indianapolis	Team
- * Club domestic league appearances and goals

Patricio Armando Toledo Toledo (born 14 July 1962) is a Chilean retired footballer who played as a goalkeeper during his career. He obtained 19 caps for the Chile national side, making his debut on 9 April 1991. His last game with the Chile national team was on 18 May 1994 against Argentina in Santiago.

== Coaching career ==
Toledo has served as a goalkeeping coach for Audax Italiano and the Palestino under-20 team.

== Personal life ==
Toledo suffered a myocardial infarction during the match in honor of the retired players and former Universidad Católica team captains Cristián Álvarez, José Pedro Fuenzalida and Milovan Mirosevic, on 28 September 2025. He was discharged five days later.

== Honours ==
Chile B

- Pan American Games Silver medal: 1987
