= Claudio Tello =

Chilean footballer (1963–2014)

Personal information
- Full name: Claudio Enrique Tello Ortiz
- Date of birth: 28 September 1963
- Date of death: 15 April 2014 (aged 50)
- Position: Defender

Senior career*
Years	Team	Apps	(Gls)
- Aviación
1983–1992	Cobreloa		
1985	→ Deportes Antofagasta (loan)		
1993–1994	Provincial Osorno	56	(0)
1995–1998	Deportes Antofagasta		

International career
1987	Chile B		
1988	Chile	8	(0)
Medal record
Men's football
Representing Chile
Pan American Games
Silver medal – second place	1987 Indianapolis	Team
- * Club domestic league appearances and goals

Claudio Enrique Tello Ortiz (28 September 1963 – 15 April 2014) was a Chilean footballer who played as a defender.

== Career ==
Tello played club football for Aviación, Cobreloa, Deportes Antofagasta and Provincial Osorno.

He also earned 8 international caps for Chile in 1988. Previously, he was a member of the Chile squad that won the silver medal in the 1987 Pan American Games.

== Later life and death ==
Tello died on 15 April 2014 at the age of 50, from cancer.
