= Ricardo Perdomo =

Uruguayan footballer (1960–2022)

Personal information
- Full name: Ricardo Javier Perdomo Moreira
- Date of birth: 3 July 1960
- Date of death: 12 August 2022 (aged 62)
- Height: 1.70 m (5 ft 7 in)
- Position: Midfielder

Senior career*
| Years | Team | Apps | (Gls) |
| 1980–1985 | Club Nacional de Football | | |
| 1985–1988 | Rayo Vallecano | 68 | (3) |
| 1988–1992 | Deportivo Mandiyú | | |
| 1992–1995 | Unión Española | | |
| 1996 | River Plate | | |
| 1996–1997 | Unión Española | | |
| 1997 | Palestino | | |
| 1998 | Rampla Juniors | | |

International career
| 1984–1985 | Uruguay | 6 | (0) |

Managerial career
- 2007–2008: Miramar Misiones
- 2009: Plaza Colonia
Medal record
Men's association football
Representing Uruguay
Pan American Games
| Gold medal – first place | 1983 Caracas | Team |
- * Club domestic league appearances and goals

Ricardo Javier "Murmullo" Perdomo Moreira (3 July 1960 – 12 August 2022) was a Uruguayan football player and head coach. He played for clubs in Uruguay, Argentina, Chile, and Spain.

== Career ==
He was a member of the Unión Española squads that won the Copa Chile in 1992 and 1993, alongside players such as Ricardo González, José Luis Sierra, José Cabrera, among others.

== Death ==
Perdomo died in August 2022, at the age of 62.

== Honours ==
Unión Española

- Copa Chile 1992, 1993
