= José Luis Sosa =

Uruguayan footballer (1956–2021)

Personal information
- Date of birth: 1 January 1956
- Date of death: 10 October 2021 (aged 65)

International career
Years	Team	Apps	(Gls)
1984	Uruguay	5	(0)
Medal record
Men's association football
Representing Uruguay
Pan American Games
Gold medal – first place	1983 Caracas	Team

José Luis Sosa (1 January 1956 – 10 October 2021) was a Uruguayan footballer who played as a goalkeeper. He played in five matches for the Uruguay national football team in 1984. He was also part of Uruguay's squad for the 1983 Copa América tournament.
