= Sailing at the 1983 Pan American Games =

Sailing at the 1983 Pan American Games lists the results of all sailing-related events held at the 1983 Pan American Games in Caracas, Venezuela.

== Men's events ==
Event	Gold	Silver	Bronze
Sailboard	Nilo Dzib; Mexico	Doug Mart; United States	Raines Kobi; Canada
Laser class	Pedro Bulhões; Brazil	Andy Roy; Canada	Gonzalo José Campero; Argentina

== Open events ==
Event	Gold	Silver	Bronze
J/24 class	United States	Canada	Argentina
470 class	Brazil	United States	Canada
Lightning class	Brazil	Chile	Argentina
Snipe class	United States	Argentina	Uruguay
Soling class	Brazil	Canada	United States
Star class	United States	Brazil	Canada

== Medal table ==
Place	Nation	Gold medal	Silver medal	Bronze medal	Total
1	Brazil	4	1	0	5
2	United States	3	2	1	6
3	Mexico	1	0	0	1
4	Canada	0	3	3	6
5	Argentina	0	1	3	4
6	Chile	0	1	0	1
7	Uruguay	0	0	1	1
Total		8	8	8	24
