= José Cabrera (Chilean footballer) =

Chilean footballer (born 1967)

Personal information
- Full name: José Miguel Cabrera Veloso
- Date of birth: June 6, 1967 (age 59)
- Place of birth: Santiago, Chile
- Position: Left-back

Youth career
- Unión Española

Senior career*
Years	Team	Apps	(Gls)
1986–1993	Unión Española	93	(0)
1991	→ Provincial Osorno (loan)	28	(1)
1993	Palestino	25	(0)
1994	Sport Recife	0	(0)
1994–1995	XV de Piracicaba	2	(0)
1995	Palestino	11	(0)
1996	Santiago Wanderers	3	(0)
1997	Unión Española	8	(0)
Total		170	(1)
- * Club domestic league appearances and goals

José Miguel Cabrera Veloso (born 6 June 1967), also known as Lito Cabrera, is a Chilean former professional footballer who played as a left-back. Besides Chile, he played in Brazil.

== Career ==
In his homeland, Cabrera developed his entire career at the Primera División. A product of Unión Española, he spent seven seasons with them from 1986 to 1992 and 1997, with a season on loan to Provincial Osorno in 1991. He was a member of the squads that won the Copa Chile in 1992 and 1993, alongside well-known players such as Ricardo Perdomo, José Luis Sierra, Ricardo González, among others.

He also played for Palestino (1993 and 1995) and Santiago Wanderers (1996).

Abroad, he had a stint in Brazil with Sport Recife and XV de Piracicaba.

== Personal life ==
He is nicknamed Lito.
