= Everaldo (footballer, born 1963) =

Brazilian footballer

Personal information
- Full name: Everaldo Aparecido Rogério
- Date of birth: 25 April 1963 (age 63)
- Place of birth: Campinas, Brazil
- Position: Centre-back

Youth career
- –1983: Guarani

Senior career*
Years	Team	Apps	(Gls)
1983–1984	Guarani		
1985–1987	Avaí		
1987–1988	Coritiba		
1989–1995	Joinville		
1995–1997	Figueirense		

International career
1983–1986	Brazil Olympic	7	(1)
Medal record
Men's football
Representing Brazil
Pan American Games
Silver medal – second place	1983 Caracas	Team
South American Games
Bronze medal – third place	1986 Santiago	Team
- * Club domestic league appearances and goals as of 25 November 2023

Everaldo Aparecido Rogério (born 25 April 1963), also known as Everaldo, is a Brazilian former professional footballer who played as a centre-back.

== Career ==
Revealed in Guarani's youth categories, Everaldo stood out in football in the south, playing more than 100 games for Avaí, in addition to Coritiba, Joinville and Figueirense.

== International career ==
In 1983, Everaldo was also part of the Olympic team of Brazil, who was won the silver medal in the Caracas Pan American Games. He was also part of the bronze medal squad at the South American Games in 1986.

== Honours ==
Brazil Olympic

- Pan American Games: (silver) 1983
- South American Games: (bronze) 1986
