= Equestrian events at the 1983 Pan American Games =

Equestrian competitions were contested by participating nations at the 1983 Pan American Games.

== Events ==
Event	Gold	Silver	Bronze
Individual dressage	Carole Grant; United States	Hilda Gurney; United States	Orlando Facada; Brazil
Team dressage	United States	Mexico	Brazil
Show jumping	Anne Kursinski; United States	James Elder; Canada	Michael Matz; United States
Team show jumping	United States; Hilda Gurney, Carole Grant, Kay Meredith	Canada	Mexico

== Medal table ==
Place	Nation	Gold medal	Silver medal	Bronze medal	Total
1	United States	4	1	1	6
2	Canada	0	2	0	2
2	Mexico	0	1	1	2
4	Brazil	0	0	2	2
Total		4	4	4	12

== See also ==
- Equestrian events at the 1984 Summer Olympics
