= Ricardo González (footballer, born 1965) =

Chilean footballer

Ricardo Gónzalez
Personal information
- Full name: Ricardo Nicolás Gónzalez Reinoso
- Date of birth: 31 August 1965 (age 61)
- Place of birth: San Felipe, Chile
- Height: 1.76 m (5 ft 9 1/2 in)
- Position: Defender

Team information
- Current team: Unión San Felipe (interim)

Youth career
- Juventud La Troya
- Unión San Felipe

Senior career*
Years	Team	Apps	(Gls)
1984–1989	Unión San Felipe		
1990–1993	Unión Española	107	(3)
1994	Colo-Colo	25	(1)
1995–1996	Deportes Temuco	52	(1)
1997–2000	Santiago Wanderers	83	(6)
2000	Palestino	21	(0)
2001–2006	Unión San Felipe		

International career
1985	Chile U20		
1993	Chile	1	(0)

Managerial career
- 2012–2016: Trasandino (youth)
- 2016–2018: Trasandino
- 2020–2021: Escuela Calle Larga (women)
- 2021–2023: Aconcagua Unido (women)
- 2023–2024: Unión San Felipe (youth)
- 2024–2025: Unión San Felipe (women) (youth)
- 2024: Unión San Felipe (caretaker)
- 2025–: Unión San Felipe (women)
- 2026–: Unión San Felipe (caretaker)
- * Club domestic league appearances and goals

Ricardo Nicolás Gónzalez Reinoso (born 31 August 1965), known as Richard González and nicknamed Manteca (Lard), is a retired Chilean footballer who played as a defender.

== Playing career ==
A historical player of his hometown club, Unión San Felipe, he made his professional debut in 1984 and retired at the end of the 2006 season, aged forty two.

He was a member of the Unión Española squads that won the Copa Chile in 1992 and 1993, alongside players such as Ricardo Perdomo, José Luis Sierra, José Cabrera, among others.

At international level, he represented Chile at under-20 level in the 1985 South American Championship.

At senior level, he obtained one cap for the Chile national side, making his only appearance on 8 September 1993 in a friendly match against Spain.

== Coaching career ==
González graduated as a football manager in 2006. In 2016, he assumed as head coach of Trasandino until September 2018.

In 2023, González assumed as coach for the Unión San Felipe under-16 team after serving as coach for Aconcagua Unido from Calle Larga commune in women's football. Later, he switche to the women's team of Unión San Felipe.

González and Esteban Carvajal assumed as interim managers of Unión San Felipe on 6 May 2026.

== Personal life ==
He is frequently named Richard González and nicknamed Manteca (Lard).

González was a candidate for councillor for San Felipe in the 2008 Chilean municipal election, supported by Independent Democratic Union.
