= Kuntz Memorial Soccer Stadium =

Outdoor soccer stadium in Indianapolis, Indiana, US

Coordinates: 39.790175°N 86.189185°W

Kuntz Stadium
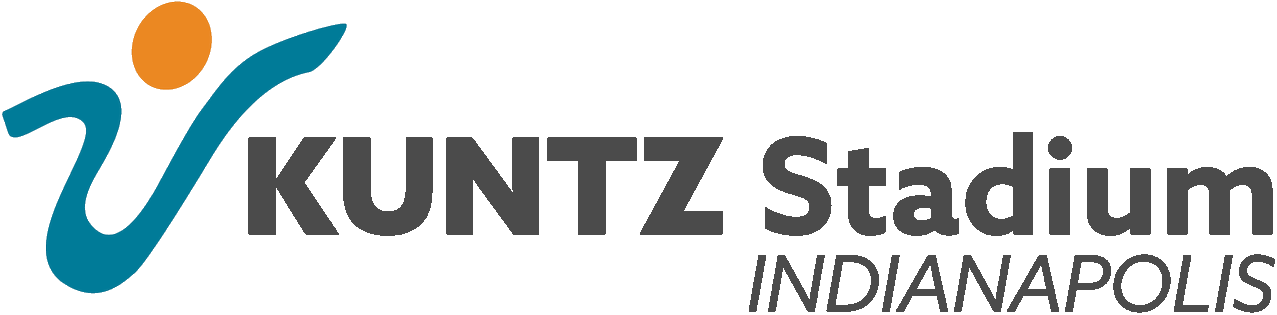

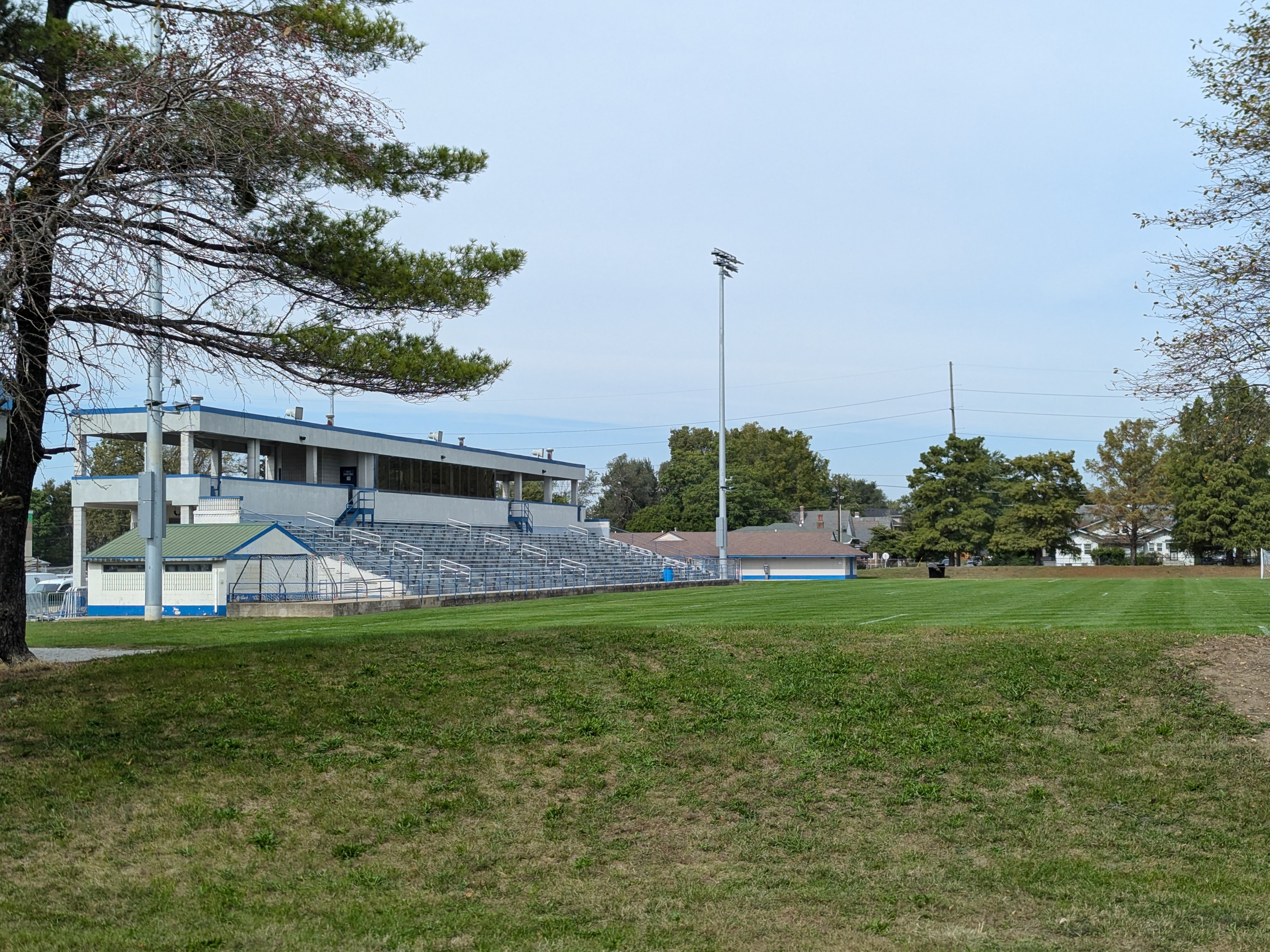
- View of the stadium field and stand in 2024
- Interactive map of Kuntz Stadium
- Address: 1502 West 16th Street; Indianapolis; U.S.
- Owner: City of Indianapolis
- Capacity: 5,257
- Type: Stadium
- Surface: Grass

Construction
- Opened: 1987; 39 years ago

Tenants
- 1987 Pan American Games; U.S. Open Cup finals (1990, 1992, 1993); IUPUI Jaguars (NCAA) (1987–2012); Indiana Blast (A-League) (1998–2004); FC Indiana (NPSL) (2007); FC Indiana (WPSL) (2007–11); Indianapolis AlleyCats (AUDL) (2013–14)

Website
- kuntzstadium.com

Kuntz Memorial Soccer Stadium is an outdoor soccer stadium located in Indianapolis. It is the location of the IHSAA State Soccer finals. It contains two FIFA-regulated game fields and seats 5,257 people. Various championship games have been played in this facility.

It was the main venue of the 1987 Pan American Games soccer tournament and three U.S. Open Cup finals (1990, 1993, and 1997). Besides, the United States men's national soccer team played three matches here in 1987 and 1988.

== See also ==
- List of attractions and events in Indianapolis
- Sports in Indianapolis
