= Esteban Carvajal =

Chilean footballer (born 1988)

Personal information
- Full name: Esteban Andrés Carvajal Tapia
- Date of birth: 17 November 1988 (age 37)
- Place of birth: Catemu, Chile
- Height: 1.72 m (5 ft 8 in)
- Position: Defensive midfielder

Team information
- Current team: Unión San Felipe (interim)

Youth career
- 2004–2007: Unión San Felipe

Senior career*
Years	Team	Apps	(Gls)
2007–2014	Unión San Felipe	108	(4)
2011	→ Olhanense (loan)	2	(0)
2011	→ O'Higgins (loan)	14	(0)
2013–2014	→ Palestino (loan)	26	(3)
2014–2017	Palestino	113	(3)
2017	→ Santiago Wanderers (loan)	15	(0)
2018	Deportes Iquique	24	(0)
2019	Coquimbo Unido	7	(0)
2019	→ Atlas (loan)	6	(0)
2020	Palestino	26	(0)
2021	Ñublense	21	(0)
2022	Santiago Morning	24	(1)
2023	Barnechea	21	(0)
2024	Rangers	4	(0)
2025	Santiago City	3	(0)

Managerial career
- 2026–: Unión San Felipe (youth)
- 2026: Unión San Felipe (interim)
- 2026–: Unión San Felipe (interim)
- * Club domestic league appearances and goals

Esteban Andrés Carvajal Tapia (Spanish pronunciation: [esˈteβaŋ kaɾβaˈxal]; born 17 November 1988) is a Chilean former footballer who played as a defensive midfielder. He is the current interim manager of Unión San Felipe.

== Club career ==
In 2024, Carvajal joined Rangers de Talca.

== International career ==
Carvajal got his first call up to the senior Chile squad for the 2018 FIFA World Cup qualifiers against Brazil and Peru in October 2015.

== Coaching career ==
Carvajal and Ricardo González assumed as interim managers of Unión San Felipe on 6 May 2026. Carvajal reassumed the charge in October of the same year after Juan José Luvera was released.

== Honours ==
Unión San Felipe

- Primera B: 2009
- Copa Chile: 2009
