= Guillermo Zavala =

Mexican swimmer

Personal information
- Full name: Guillermo Zavala Hidalgo
- Born: 28 January 1958 (age 68) Mexico
- Height: 176 cm (5 ft 9 in)
- Weight: 67 kg (148 lb)

Sport
- Sport: Swimming

Guillermo Zavala Hidalgo (born 28 January 1958) is a Mexican former freestyle and medley swimmer. He later became an pathologist.

Zavala was the national record holder in the 400 metre individual medley with a time of 4:35.93.

He competed at the 1976 Summer Olympics and the 1980 Summer Olympics.

At the Swimming at the 1979 Pan American Games he qualified fourth for the final of the men's 400 metre individual medley event, but was disqualified in the final.

Zavala represented his country also at other international championships, including the 1975 Pan American Games and 1978 World Championships.

After his swimming career, Zavala became a small animal orthopedic surgeon and later as an independent consultant at Avian Health International having worked in over 60 countries. He is induced at the Hall of Honor of the American Association of Avian Pathologists.
