= Kay Meredith =

American equestrian and novelist (1936–2022)

Medal record

Equestrian

Representing the United States

Pan American Games
Gold medal – first place	1983 Caracas	Team dressage

Kay Frances Meredith (née Huggins, February 26, 1936 – November 14, 2022) was an American equestrian and writer. Meredith was born in West Virginia and lived in Raleigh, North Carolina. She represented the United States at numerous international dressage competitions and became National Grand Prix Champion in 1982. In 1979, she was named the American Horse Show Association Horsewoman of the Year.

As a founding member of the United States Dressage Federation, Meredith served as the second USDF Vice President before she served as the President from 1977 to 1982. In 2004 the Roemer Foundation placed Kay Meredith into the USDF Hall of Fame by honoring her with their prestigious Lifetime Achievement Award.

Meredith was born in Wood County, West Virginia. She died in a hospice in Raleigh, North Carolina, on November 14, 2022, at the age of 86.
