= Rob Woodhouse =

Australian swimmer

Personal information
- Full name: Robert Woodhouse
- Nickname: "Rob"
- National team: Australia
- Born: 23 June 1966 (age 60) Melbourne, Australia.
- Height: 1.90 m (6 ft 3 in)
- Weight: 77 kg (170 lb)

Sport
- Sport: Swimming
- Strokes: Medley
Medal record
Men's swimming
Representing Australia
Olympic Games
Bronze medal – third place	1984 Los Angeles	400 m medley
Pan Pacific Games
Silver medal – second place	1985 Tokyo	200 m medley
Silver medal – second place	1987 Brisbane	400 m medley
Commonwealth Games
Silver medal – second place	1986 Edinburgh	200 m medley
Silver medal – second place	1986 Edinburgh	400 m medley
Silver medal – second place	1990 Auckland	400 m medley
Summer Universiade
Gold medal – first place	1987 Zagreb	400 m medley
Silver medal – second place	1985 Kobe	400 m medley
Silver medal – second place	1987 Zagreb	200 m medley

Robert Woodhouse (born 23 June 1966) is an Australian former competition swimmer who specialised in medley swimming. He is now a sports agent and company director. Woodhouse and Brendon Smith are the only Australian men to have won an Olympic medal in an individual medley event. He was awarded the Australian Sports Medal in 2000.

== Biography ==
Woodhouse was educated at Melbourne's Scotch College, Swinburne University (BBus), and Victoria University (MBA).

Representing the Australian swimming team, he competed at the 1984 Summer Olympics in Los Angeles and the 1988 Summer Olympics in Seoul, as well as the Commonwealth Games in Brisbane (1982), Edinburgh (1986), and Auckland (1990). He was an Australian Institute of Sport (AIS) scholarship holder. His sister Susie was also an AIS scholarship holder. He is also the uncle of Susie's children, David and Emma McKeon, who are also Olympic swimmers.

He later served as general manager of the London Roar professional swim club in the International Swimming League from 2019 to 2022.

== Sporting achievements ==
- Bronze, 400 Metre Individual Medley, 1984 Los Angeles Olympics
- US National Champion 400m Individual Medley – 1984
- Silver, 200m Individual Medley, Pan Pacific Games, Tokyo – 1985
- Silver, 200 Metre Individual Medley, 1986 Commonwealth Games, Edinburgh
- Silver, 400 Metre Individual Medley, 1986 Commonwealth Games, Edinburgh
- Gold, 400 Metre Individual medley, 1987 World University Games, Zagreb
- Silver, 400 Metre Individual Medley, 1990 Commonwealth Games, Auckland

Woodhouse retired from swimming in 1990.

- Duke Kahanamoku Medal, Australian Monthly Swim 2019, Sydney

== Business career ==
Woodhouse set up his own sports management company in 1995. In the following years, he merged his business with the firm of former Collingwood football player Craig Kelly, forming Elite Sports Properties. Elite Sports Properties has represented Australian Olympians, footballers and media personalities. The company established in Great Britain in 2008, representing a number of high-profile British Olympians including Sir Chris Hoy, Rebecca Adlington and Adam Peaty. In 2015 the company was sold to TLA Worldwide.

Woodhouse has also appeared as part of various radio and television swimming commentary teams at swimming world championships (1998, 2007, 2009), Olympic Games (2004, 2008, 2012, 2016 and 2020), and Commonwealth Games (1994, 2006, 2010, 2014 and 2018).

Woodhouse served as the general manager for the swim club London Roar, a member of the International Swimming League, starting in 2019 and stopping in 2022 in part due to issues surrounding the non-payment of athletes. One of the swimmers of London Roar, Kyle Chalmers, publicly expressed gratitude for Woodhouse via the team website, saying, "I want to say a huge thank you to Rob for his tireless work over the past 3 seasons of ISL and his commitment to all the athletes involved with the London Roar. We couldn't have had the success and fantastic memories without you."

== See also ==
- List of Commonwealth Games medallists in swimming (men)
- List of Olympic medalists in swimming (men)
