= Miguel Peirano (footballer) =

Uruguayan footballer (born 1960)

Personal information
- Full name: Miguel Ángel Peirano Castro
- Date of birth: 30 June 1960 (age 66)
- Place of birth: Montevideo, Uruguay
- Position: Defender

Senior career*
| Years | Team | Apps | (Gls) |
| – | River Plate (URU) | | |
| – | Rampla Juniors | | |
| – | C.A. Cerro | | |
| – | El Tanque Sisley | | |
| – | C.A. Rentistas | | |
| 1980–1984 | C.A. Peñarol | | |
| 1984–1985 | Sevilla | 3 | (0) |
| 1986 | C.A. Progreso | | |
| 1987 | LDU Quito | | |
| 1987–1989 | Levadiakos | 31 | (5) |
| – | XV de Jaú | | |

International career
| 1983 | Uruguay | | |
Medal record
Men's association football
Representing Uruguay
Pan American Games
| Gold medal – first place | 1983 Caracas | Team |
- * Club domestic league appearances and goals

Miguel Ángel Peirano Castro (born 30 June 1960) is a former Uruguayan footballer who played as a defender.

== Club career ==
Peirano played for C.A. Peñarol and C.A. Progreso in the Primera División Uruguaya. He played in the Spanish La Liga with Sevilla F.C. during the 1984-85 season. He also had a spell in the Super League Greece with Levadiakos during the 1987–88 and 1988-89 seasons.

== International career ==
Peirano appeared for the senior Uruguayan soccer team at the 1983 Pan American Games, scoring the game-winning goal in the final against Brazil.
