= Luís Carlos (footballer, born 1962) =

Brazilian footballer

Personal information
- Full name: Luís Carlos de Aquino Guirra
- Date of birth: 25 December 1962 (age 63)
- Place of birth: Recife, Brazil
- Height: 1.78 m (5 ft 10 in)
- Position: Forward

Youth career
- Sport Recife

Senior career*
Years	Team	Apps	(Gls)
1981–1987	Sport Recife		
1983–1984	→ Confiança (loan)		
1987	Santos		
1988–1990	Real Murcia		
1990	Sport Recife		
1991	Londrina		
1992	Fortaleza		
1993	Sampaio Corrêa		
1999	Confiança	1	(1)

International career
1987	Brazil Olympic	3	(0)
Medal record
Men's Football
Representing Brazil
Pan American Games
Winner	1987 Indianapolis
- * Club domestic league appearances and goals as of 24 November 2023

Luís Carlos de Aquino Guirra (born 25 December 1962), simply known as Luís Carlos, is a Brazilian former professional footballer who played as a forward.

== Career ==
Revealed at Sport Recife, Luís Carlos also played for Confiança, Santos, Real Murcia, Londrina, Fortaleza and Sampaio Correa, where he retired in 1993. He returned from retirement to play once again, 18 May 1999, in a match against Itabaiana.

== International career ==
Luís Carlos was part of the Olympic team of Brazil in 1987, being champion of the Indianapolis Pan American Games.

== Honours ==
Brazil Olympic

- Pan American Games: (gold) 1987

Confiança

- Campeonato Sergipano: 1983

Individual

- 1983 Campeonato Sergipano top scorer: 22 goals
- 1984 Campeonato Pernambucano top scorer: 40 goals
- 1986 Campeonato Pernambucano top scorer: 14 goals
