= Gustavo Acosta (footballer) =

Argentinian association football player

Gustavo Jorge Acosta
Personal information
- Full name: Gustavo Jorge Acosta
- Date of birth: November 22, 1965
- Place of birth: Mar del Plata, Argentina
- Date of death: April 3, 2024 (58 years old)
- Position: Midfielder

Senior career*
Years	Team	Apps	(Gls)
–1991	Ferro (Argentina)	170	(10)
1991–1992	FC St. Pauli	16	(3)
1992–1993	SV Lurup		
1993	Lleida	9	(0)
1993	Cádiz	11	(1)
1994–1996	Nueva Chicago	40	(0)
- * Club domestic league appearances and goals

Gustavo Jorge Acosta (22 November 1965 in Mar del Plata – 3 April 2024) was an Argentine professional footballer who played as a midfielder.

== Career ==
Acosta started his career with Argentine side Ferro (Argentina) where he made 170 league appearances and scored ten goals, helping them win their only two top flight titles. In 1991, Acosta signed for FC St. Pauli in the German second division. In 1992, he signed for German third division club SV Lurup. In 1993, he signed for Lleida in the Spanish second division, helping them earn promotion to the Spanish La Liga. In 1994, Acosta signed for Argentine second division team Nueva Chicago.
