= Washington (footballer, born 1960) =

Brazilian footballer

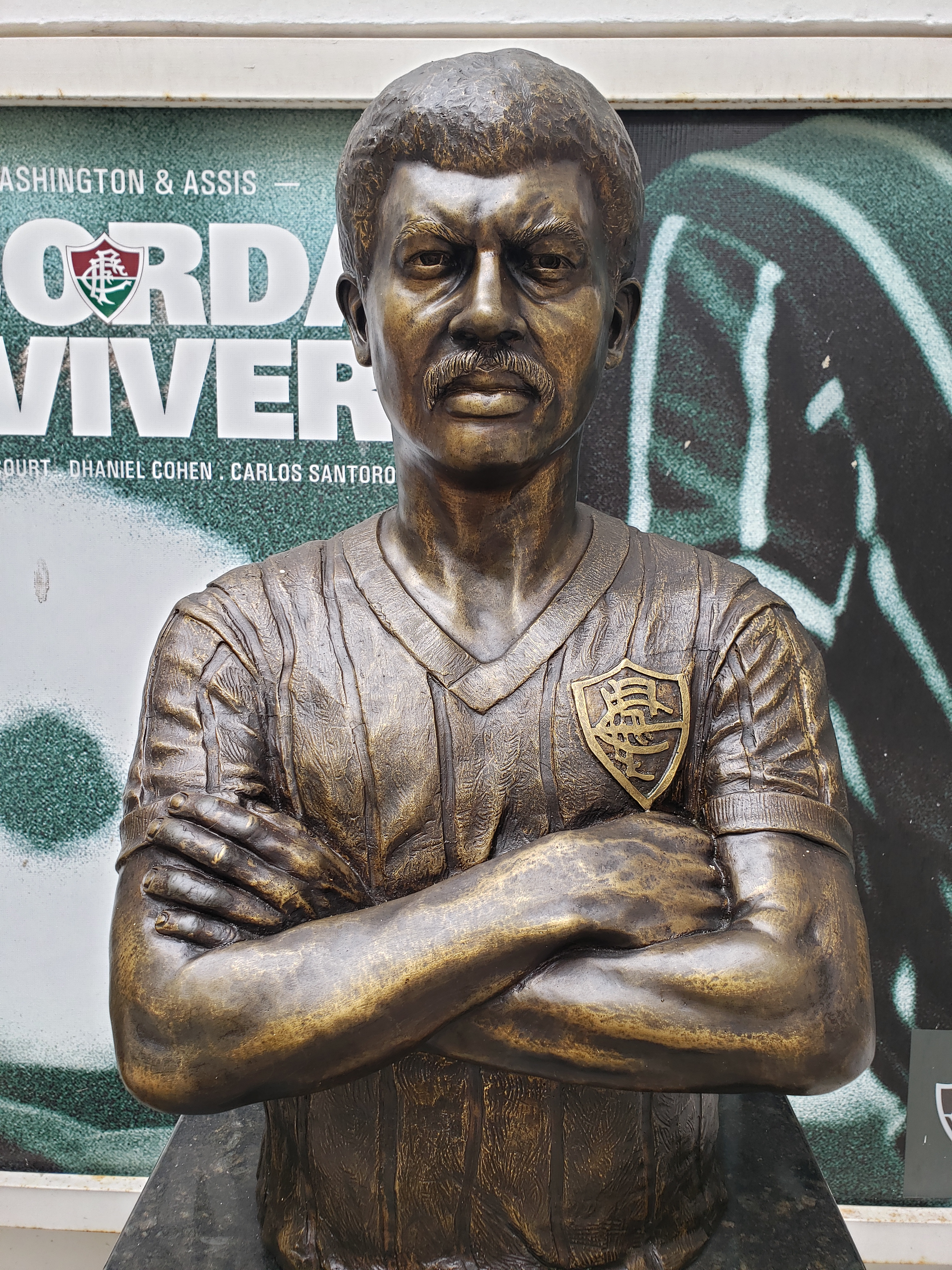
- Bust of Washington César Santos at the headquarters of Fluminense Football Club

Personal information
- Full name: Washington César Santos
- Date of birth: January 3, 1960
- Place of birth: Valença, Bahia, Brazil
- Date of death: May 25, 2014 (aged 54)
- Place of death: Curitiba, Brazil
- Position: Striker
Medal record
Men's football
Representing Brazil
Pan American Games
Gold medal – first place	1987 Indianapolis	Team competition

Washington César Santos (January 3, 1960 – May 25, 2014) was a Brazilian footballer who played as a striker. He was born in Valença, Bahia State, and died in Curitiba.

In his career (1980–1996) he played for several clubs: Galícia (1980 and 1995), Corinthians, Operário and Internacional (1981) Atlético Paranaense (1982–1983 and 1992), Fluminense (1983–1989, eighth best top goalscorer in club history with 118 goals in 311 matches), Guarani (1989–1990), Botafogo (1990–1991) União São João (1991–1992) Desportiva-ES (1992) Santa Cruz (1993–1994) Figueiras (1994), Fortaleza (1996) and Foz de Iguaçu (1996).

He won one Rio Grande do Sul State Tournament (1981), one Paraná State Tournament (1982), four Campeonato Carioca (1983, 1984, 1985, 1990), and one Campeonato Brasileiro Série A (1984),

With the Brazil national football team he got 5 international caps and won the 1987 Pan American Games.

On 25 May 2014 Washington died due to amyotrophic lateral sclerosis.
