= José Luiz Aguiar e Ramalho =

Brazilian handball player (born 1963)

Personal information
- Full name: José Luiz Bueno de Aguiar e Ramalho
- Born: 3 June 1963 (age 62); São Paulo, Brazil

Sport
- Country: Brazil
- Sport: Handball

José Luiz Aguiar e Ramalho (born 3 June 1963) is a Brazilian handball player. He competed in the 1992 Summer Olympics.
