= Edson Rizzo =

Brazilian handball player (born 1957)

Personal information
- Born: 22 November 1957 (age 67); São Paulo, Brazil

Sport
- Sport: Handball

Edson Rizzo (born 22 November 1957) is a Brazilian handball player. He competed in the men's tournament at the 1992 Summer Olympics.
