= Swimming at the 1975 Pan American Games – Men's 200 metre individual medley =

Men's 200 metre individual medley at the 1975 Pan American Games
- Venue: -
- Dates: October 22 (preliminaries and finals)
- Competitors: from - nations

Medalists
Gold medal	Steve Furniss	United States
Silver medal	Mike Curington	United States
Bronze medal	Bill Sawchuk	Canada

The men's 200 metre individual medley competition of the swimming events at the 1975 Pan American Games took place on 22 October. The last Pan American Games champion was Steve Furniss of the United States.

This race consisted of four lengths of the pool, one each in backstroke, breaststroke, butterfly and freestyle swimming.

== Results ==
All times are in minutes and seconds.

KEY:	q	Fastest non-qualifiers	Q	Qualified	GR	Games record	NR	National record	PB	Personal best	SB	Seasonal best

=== Final ===
The final was held on October 22.

Rank	Name	Nationality	Time	Notes
1st place, gold medalist(s)	Steve Furniss	United States	2:09.77	
2nd place, silver medalist(s)	Mike Curington	United States	2:10.17	
3rd place, bronze medalist(s)	Bill Sawchuk	Canada	2:11.63	
4	-	-	-	
5	-	-	-	
6	-	-	-	
7	Carlos da Rocha Azevedo	Brazil	2:17.39	
8	-	-	-	
