= Hugo (footballer, born 1964) =

Brazilian footballer

Personal information
- Full name: Hugo José Duarte
- Date of birth: 20 June 1964 (age 62)
- Place of birth: Morrinhos, Brazil
- Position: Goalkeeper

Youth career
- –1983: Flamengo

Senior career*
Years	Team	Apps	(Gls)
1983–1986	Flamengo	10	(0)
1987–1988	O Elvas		
1989–1992	Estrela da Amadora		
1993	Rio Branco-SP		
1993–1994	Corinthians	3	(0)
1995	Santo André		
1996	Rio Branco-SP		
1997	São José-SP		
1997	Ituano		
1998	Fluminense	1	(0)

International career
1983	Brazil U20		
1983	Brazil Olympic	3	(0)
Medal record
Men's football
Representing Brazil
Pan American Games
Silver medal – second place	1983 Caracas	Team
- * Club domestic league appearances and goals as of 24 November 2023

Hugo José Duarte (born 20 June 1964), simply known as Hugo, is a Brazilian former professional footballer who played as a goalkeeper.

== Career ==
Revealed at Flamengo, Hugo had few opportunities at the club. It was negotiated in 1987 with "O Elvas" Clube Alentejano de Desportos. The following season, he went to Estrela da Amadora, where he became champion of the Portugal Cup in 1989–90. He returned to Brazil and played for some teams in the interior of the state of São Paulo, and a quick spell at Corinthians, again, without getting many appearances.

== International career ==
In 1983, Hugo was part of the Brazil under-20 team that won the South American Championship and the World Youth Championship. In the same year, he was also part of the Olympic team of Brazil, who was won the silver medal in the Caracas Pan American Games.

== Honours ==
Brazil U20

- South American U-20 Championship: 1983
- FIFA World Youth Championship: 1983

Brazil Olympic

- Pan American Games: (silver) 1983

Estrela da Amadora

- Taça de Portugal: 1989–90
