= Paulinho Carioca =

Brazilian footballer (born 1964)

Personal information
- Full name: Paulo Roberto Ferreira Primo
- Date of birth: 24 March 1964 (age 62)
- Place of birth: Rio de Janeiro, Brazil
- Position: Right winger

Youth career
- –1982: Fluminense

Senior career*
Years	Team	Apps	(Gls)
1982–1987	Fluminense		
1988–1989	Corinthians	48	(2)
1990	Palmeiras	52	(3)
1990	Flamengo	5	(0)
1991	Puebla		
1991	America-RJ		
1992	Fluminense		
1992–1993	União da Madeira		
1994	Volta Redonda		
1994	Rio Verde-GO		
1995	Araçatuba		

International career
1983	Brazil U20		
1983–1986	Brazil Olympic	6	(0)
Medal record
Men's football
Representing Brazil
Pan American Games
Silver medal – second place	1983 Caracas	Team
South American Games
Bronze medal – third place	1986 Santiago	Team
- * Club domestic league appearances and goals as of 24 November 2023

Paulo Roberto Ferreira Primo (born 24 March 1964), better known as Paulinho or Paulinho Carioca, is a Brazilian former professional footballer who played as a right winger.

== Career ==
Paulinho played for several clubs in Brazil, with emphasis on Fluminense, where he was state and Brazilian champion, and at Corinthians, being champion of the 1988 Campeonato Paulista. He also played for Palmeiras and Flamengo.

== International career ==
In 1983, Paulinho was part of the Brazil under-20 team that won the South American Championship and the World Youth Championship. In the same year, he was also part of the Olympic team of Brazil, who was won the silver medal in the Caracas Pan American Games. He was also part of the bronze medal squad at the South American Games in 1986.

== Honours ==
Brazil U20

- South American U-20 Championship: 1983
- FIFA World Youth Championship: 1983

Brazil Olympic

- Pan American Games: (silver) 1983
- South American Games: (bronze) 1986

Fluminense

- Campeonato Carioca: 1983, 1984, 1985
- Campeonato Brasileiro: 1984
- Kirin Cup: 1987

Corinthians

- Campeonato Paulista: 1988
