= Guto (footballer, born 1964) =

Brazilian footballer

Personal information
- Full name: José Augusto Bagatini
- Date of birth: 14 May 1964 (age 62)
- Place of birth: Rio Claro, Brazil
- Position: Centre-back

Youth career
- –1983: XV de Jaú
- 1983: Flamengo

Senior career*
Years	Team	Apps	(Gls)
1983–1988	Flamengo	127	(1)
1987–1991	O Elvas		
1991–1994	Belenenses		
1994	Vitória		
1994–1995	Ovarense		

International career
1983	Brazil U20		
1983	Brazil Olympic	3	(0)
Medal record
Men's football
Representing Brazil
Pan American Games
Silver medal – second place	1983 Caracas	Team
- * Club domestic league appearances and goals as of 25 November 2023

José Augusto Bagatini (born 14 May 1964), better known as Guto, is a Brazilian former professional footballer who played as a centre-back.

== Career ==
Guto started his career at Vasco de Torrinha, an amateur team. He was called to train at XV de Jaú, where the Brazil under-20 team called-up, and a few weeks later, he was hired by CR Flamengo and was part of the champion teams of the 1986 Campeonato Carioca and the Copa União. He ended his career playing for football in Portugal.

== International career ==
In 1983, Guto was part of the Brazil under-20 team that won the South American Championship and the World Youth Championship. In the same year, he was also part of the Olympic team of Brazil, who was won the silver medal in the Caracas Pan American Games.

== Honours ==
Brazil U20

- South American U-20 Championship: 1983
- FIFA World Youth Championship: 1983

Brazil Olympic

- Pan American Games: (silver) 1983

Flamengo

- Copa União Green Module: 1987
- Campeonato Carioca: 1986
