= Adalberto (footballer, born 1964) =

Brazilian footballer

Personal information
- Full name: Adalberto Machado
- Date of birth: 3 June 1964 (age 62)
- Place of birth: Rio de Janeiro, Brazil
- Height: 1.69 m (5 ft 7 in)
- Position: Left back

Youth career
- 1981–1982: Flamengo

Senior career*
| Years | Team | Apps | (Gls) |
| 1983–1989 | Flamengo | 183 | (7) |
| Total | | 183 | (7) |

International career
| 1983 | Brazil U20 | | |
| 1983–1984 | Brazil U23 | | |
Medal record
Men's football
Representing Brazil
Pan American Games
| Silver medal – second place | 1983 Caracas | Team |
- * Club domestic league appearances and goals

Adalberto Machado (born 3 June 1964), simply known as Adalberto, is a Brazilian retired footballer who played as a left back.

== Club career ==
A Flamengo youth graduate, Rio de Janeiro-born Adalberto was promoted to the first team in 1983, but spent his first year sidelined due to a leg break. He made his first team debut in a 0–0 draw against Guarani in the year's Campeonato Brasileiro Série A.

An immediate backup of Júnior, Adalberto scored his first goal in March 1984, netting the opener in a 3–0 home win against Brasil de Pelotas. When Júnior was sold to Torino, he became the first-choice and appeared regularly until the end of the year.

Adalberto started the 1985 campaign as an undisputed starter, scoring a brace in a 6–1 routing of rivals Botafogo. He subsequently struggled severely with injuries, which prompted him to end his career at the age of just 24.

== International career ==
Adalberto represented Brazil at under-20 and under-23 levels. He won the 1983 South American U-20 Championship and 1983 FIFA World Youth Championship, while also appearing in the 1983 Pan American Games.

== Personal life ==
He is the father of Spanish international forward Rodrigo. Adalberto opened a football school in Vigo alongside 1994 FIFA World Cup winner Mazinho.

== Honours ==
=== Club ===
Flamengo

- Campeonato Carioca: 1986, 1987, 1988
- Campeonato Brasileiro Série A: 1989
- Taça Guanabara: 1987

=== International ===
Brazil U20

- South American Youth Football Championship: 1983
- FIFA U-20 World Cup: 1983
