= Swimming at the 1975 Pan American Games – Men's 400 metre individual medley =

Men's 400 metre individual medley at the 1975 Pan American Games
- Venue: -
- Dates: October 20 (preliminaries and finals)
- Competitors: from - nations

Medalists
Gold medal	Steve Furniss	United States
Silver medal	Rick Colella	United States
Bronze medal	Ricardo Marmolejo	Mexico

The men's 400 metre individual medley competition of the swimming events at the 1975 Pan American Games took place on 20 October. The last Pan American Games champion was Steve Furniss of US.

This race consisted of eight lengths of the pool. The first two lengths were swum using the butterfly stroke, the second pair with the backstroke, the third pair of lengths in breaststroke, and the final two were freestyle.

== Results ==
All times are in minutes and seconds.

KEY:	q	Fastest non-qualifiers	Q	Qualified	GR	Games record	NR	National record	PB	Personal best	SB	Seasonal best

=== Final ===
The final was held on October 20.

Rank	Name	Nationality	Time	Notes
1st place, gold medalist(s)	Steve Furniss	United States	4:40.38	GR
2nd place, silver medalist(s)	Rick Colella	United States	4:40.91	
3rd place, bronze medalist(s)	Ricardo Marmolejo	Mexico	4:43.67	
4	-	-	-	
5	-	-	-	
6	-	-	-	
7	-	-	-	
8	-	-	-	
