= Heitor (footballer, born 1964) =

Brazilian footballer

Personal information
- Full name: Heitor Camarin Júnior
- Date of birth: 14 February 1964 (age 62)
- Place of birth: Tietê, Brazil
- Position: Right back

Youth career
- Laranjalense

Senior career*
Years	Team	Apps	(Gls)
1983	Ponte Preta	1	(0)
1983–1984	Flamengo	21	(0)
1985	Náutico	19	(1)
1985–1986	Vasco da Gama	21	(2)
1986–1987	Vitória de Guimarães	11	(0)
1987–1991	Nacional da Madeira	91	(11)
1991–1995	Marítimo	135	(27)

International career
1983	Brazil U20	6	(0)
1983	Brazil Olympic	3	(2)
Medal record
Men's football
Representing Brazil
Pan American Games
Silver medal – second place	1983 Caracas	Team
- * Club domestic league appearances and goals as of 25 November 2023

Heitor Camarin Júnior (born 14 February 1964), simply known as Heitor, is a Brazilian former professional footballer who played as a right back.

== Career ==
Heitor started his career at Laranjalense de Laranjal Paulista, then played for Ponte Preta and Flamengo, where he was appointed as Leandro replacement. He was traded to Portuguese football early, and played there for most of his career.

== International career ==
In 1983, Heitor was part of the Brazil under-20 team that won the South American Championship and the World Youth Championship. In the same year, he was also part of the Olympic team of Brazil, who was won the silver medal in the Caracas Pan American Games.

== Honours ==
Brazil U20

- South American U-20 Championship: 1983
- FIFA World Youth Championship: 1983

Brazil Olympic

- Pan American Games: (silver) 1983
