= Pereira (footballer, born 1962) =

Brazilian footballer

Personal information
- Full name: Márcio Pereira Monteiro
- Date of birth: 8 February 1962 (age 64)
- Place of birth: Belo Horizonte, Brazil
- Position: Goalkeeper

Youth career
- –1981: Atlético Mineiro

Senior career*
Years	Team	Apps	(Gls)
1981–1987	Atlético Mineiro	137	(0)
1988	Coritiba		
1988–1990	Cruzeiro	40	(0)
1990	União São João		
1990–1991	América Mineiro		
1991–1992	Cruzeiro	5	(0)
1993–1994	LDU Quito		
1995	Inter de Limeira		
1995	Ituano		
1996–1997	Inter de Limeira		
1998	Sãocarlense		

International career
1981	Brazil U20		
1987	Brazil Olympic	1	(0)

Managerial career
- 2014: Nacional de Muriaé
Medal record
Men's Football
Representing Brazil
Pan American Games
Winner	1987 Indianapolis
- * Club domestic league appearances and goals as of 24 November 2023

Márcio Pereira Monteiro (born 8 February 1962), simply known as Pereira, is a Brazilian former professional footballer and manager who played as a goalkeeper.

== Career ==
Revealed in Atlético Mineiro's youth categories, Pereira played 137 times, won 7 titles and was part of the squad from 1981 to 1987. He also played for Coritiba, Cruzeiro, América Mineiro and other clubs, until retiring at Sãocarlense in 1998.

== International career ==
Pereira is one of the goalkeepers for Brazil U20 in the 1981 FIFA World Youth Championship. He was also part of the Olympic team of Brazil in 1987, being champion of the Indianapolis Pan American Games. Cláudio Taffarel substitute, he only played one game, this being exactly the gold medal match against Chile.

== Managerial career ==
In 2014 he was the coach of Nacional de Muriaé in the Campeonato Mineiro Segunda Divisão.

== Honours ==
Brazil Olympic

- Pan American Games: (gold) 1987

Atlético Mineiro

- Campeonato Mineiro: 1981, 1982, 1983, 1985, 1986
- Taça Minas Gerais: 1986, 1987
