= Bill Sawchuk =

Canadian swimmer (born 1959)

Personal information
- Full name: William M. Sawchuk
- Nickname: "Bill"
- National team: Canada
- Born: January 8, 1959 (age 67) Roblin, Manitoba

Sport
- Sport: Swimming
- Strokes: Freestyle, butterfly, medley
- Club: Thunderbolts Swim Club
- College team: University of Florida
Medal record
Men's swimming
Representing Canada
Pan American Games
Silver medal – second place	1979 San Juan	400 m medley
Silver medal – second place	1979 San Juan	4×100 m freestyle
Silver medal – second place	1979 San Juan	4×100 m medley
Bronze medal – third place	1975 Mexico City	200 m medley
Bronze medal – third place	1979 San Juan	200 m butterfly
Bronze medal – third place	1979 San Juan	4×200 m freestyle
Commonwealth Games
Gold medal – first place	1978 Edmonton	4×100 m freestyle
Gold medal – first place	1978 Edmonton	4×100 m medley
Silver medal – second place	1978 Edmonton	4×200 m freestyle
Silver medal – second place	1978 Edmonton	100 m freestyle
Silver medal – second place	1978 Edmonton	200 m medley
Bronze medal – third place	1978 Edmonton	100 m butterfly
Bronze medal – third place	1978 Edmonton	400 m medley

William Matthew Sawchuk (born January 8, 1959) is a Canadian former swimmer, competing in the butterfly, freestyle and medley events during the 1970s and early 1980s.

In his international debut as a 16-year-old at the 1975 Pan American Games in Mexico City, he won a bronze medal for his third-place finish in the 200-metre individual medley. He represented Canada at the 1976 Summer Olympics in Montreal, Quebec, where he competed in the preliminary heats of the 200 and 400-metre freestyle events, the 400-metre individual medley, and the 4×200-metre freestyle relay.

At the 1978 Commonwealth Games in Edmonton, Alberta, Sawchuk led the three Canadian relay teams to gold medals in the 4×100-metre freestyle and the 4×100-metre medley events, and a silver in the 4×200-metre freestyle. In individual competition, he also won two silver medals in the 100-metre freestyle and 200-metre individual medley, and two bronzes in the 100-metre butterfly and 400-metre individual medley – for a total of seven medals.

Sawchuk accepted an athletic scholarship to attend the University of Florida in Gainesville, Florida, where he swam for coach Randy Reese's Florida Gators swimming and diving team in National Collegiate Athletic Association (NCAA) and Southeastern Conference (SEC) competition in 1979 and again in 1981 and 1982. In his three years as a Gator, he was recognized as the SEC Male Swimmer of the Year in 1979, and earned six All-American honours. At the 1981 NCAA Swimming Championships, Sawchuk, together with Gator teammates John Hillencamp, Geoff Gaberino and David Larson, won the national title in the 800-yard freestyle relay.

After his freshman season, Sawchuk turned in a five-medal performance at the 1979 Pan American Games in San Juan, Puerto Rico, winning three silver medals in the 400-metre individual medley, 4×100-metre freestyle relay and 4×100-metre medley relay, and a pair of bronze medals in the 200-metre butterfly and 4×200-metre freestyle relay. Afterward, he withdrew from the University of Florida to train full-time for the 1980 Olympics. Sawchuk qualified for the 1980 Canadian Olympic team, but was unable to compete at the 1980 Summer Olympics in Moscow when Canada joined the United States-led boycott over the Soviet Union's invasion of Afghanistan.

Sawchuk returned to the University of Florida after the 1980 Olympics, and graduated with a bachelor's degree in exercise and sport science in 1984.

== See also ==
- List of Commonwealth Games medallists in swimming (men)
- List of University of Florida alumni
- List of University of Florida Olympians
