= Football at the 1983 Pan American Games =

Football – Men's tournament at the 1983 Pan American Games
- Venue: Brígido Iriarte Stadium
- Dates: 15–27 August

Medalists
Gold medal	Uruguay
Silver medal	Brazil
Bronze medal	Guatemala

The ninth edition of the men's football tournament at the Pan American Games was held in Caracas, Venezuela, from 15 August to 27 August 1983. Ten teams competed in a first round-robin competition, with Brazil defending the title. After the preliminary round there was a semifinal and a final.

Uruguay, coached by Oscar Tabárez, won their first Pan American title after beating Brazil 1–0 in the final.

== Qualifying ==
=== North America ===
Bermuda v Bahamas
5 June
First leg

Bermuda	3–1	Bahamas
	Report

Bermuda National Stadium, Devonshire Parish

12 June
Second leg

Bahamas	0–5	Bermuda
	Report

Thomas Robinson Stadium, Nassau

USA v Canada
6 July
First leg

United States	1–1	Canada
Lischner 8'	Report	Vrablic 15'

Giants Stadium, East Rutherford

10 July
Second leg

Canada	2–3	United States
Sudeyko 55'; Odinga 87'	Report	Fox 12', 51'; Hooker 62'

McMaster University Stadium, Hamilton
Referee: Rex Osborne (Bermuda)

== Participants ==
- Argentina
- Bermuda (qualifying winner)
- Brazil
- Chile
- Cuba
- Guatemala
- Mexico
- United States (qualifying winner)
- Uruguay
- Venezuela

== Original draw ==
Originally, the tournament was to have been played by 12 teams organised into four groups of three teams, but Honduras and Suriname withdrew, forcing a rearrangement of the original draw (shown below).

- Group A: Venezuela, Chile, Suriname
- Group B: Brazil, United States, Bermuda
- Group C: Argentina, Guatemala, Honduras
- Group D: Uruguay, Mexico, Cuba

== First round ==
=== Group A ===
Rank	Team	Pts.	Pld	W	D	L	GF	GA
1	Uruguay	4	2	2	0	0	2	0
2	Venezuela	2	2	1	0	1	3	3
3	Bermuda	0	2	0	0	2	2	4

15 Aug

Venezuela	0–1	Uruguay
	Report	Batista 82'

Olympic Stadium, Caracas
Referee: Abel Gnecco (Argentina)

17 Aug

Uruguay	1–0	Bermuda
Azzinari 66'	Report

Olympic Stadium, Caracas
Referee: Osvaldo Brea (Cuba)

19 Aug

Venezuela	3–2	Bermuda
Zubizarreta 24'; Carvajal 40'; Castellanos 43'	Report	Jambe 34'; Bean 67'

Olympic Stadium, Caracas
Referee: Norberto Noguera (Guatemala)

=== Group B ===
Rank	Team	Pts.	Pld	W	D	L	GF	GA
1	Brazil	4	2	2	0	0	3	0
2	Mexico	2	2	1	0	1	2	1
3	Argentina	0	2	0	0	2	0	4

15 Aug

Brazil	2–0	Argentina
Marcus Vinícius 20'; Heitor 25'	Report

Brígido Iriarte Stadium, Caracas
Attendance: 20,000
Referee: Carlos Alfaro (Costa Rica)

17 Aug

Mexico	2–0	Argentina
Meza 52' (pen.); Ruiz 75'	Report

Brígido Iriarte Stadium, Caracas
Attendance: 10,000
Referee: Luis Da Rosa (Uruguay)

19 Aug

Brazil	1–0	Mexico
Heitor 2'	Report

Brígido Iriarte Stadium, Caracas
Attendance: 10,000
Referee: Mario Lira (Chile)

=== Group C ===
Rank	Team	Pts.	Pld	W	D	L	GF	GA
1	Guatemala	4	3	1	2	0	5	2
2	Chile	4	3	1	2	0	3	2
3	Cuba	3	3	0	3	0	1	1
4	United States	1	3	0	1	2	1	5

15 Aug

Cuba	0–0	Chile
	Report

Brígido Iriarte Stadium, Caracas
Attendance: 15,000

15 Aug

Guatemala	3–0	United States
Claverí 60'; Bobadilla 76'; Gómez Rendón 82'	Report

Brígido Iriarte Stadium, Caracas
Attendance: 7,000

17 Aug

Cuba	0–0	United States
	Report

Brígido Iriarte Stadium, Caracas

17 Aug

Guatemala	1–1	Chile
Bobadilla 29'	Report	Castañeda 45'

Brígido Iriarte Stadium, Caracas

19 Aug

Chile	2–1	United States
Vera 48'; Gálvez 57'	Report	McDaniel 31'

Brígido Iriarte Stadium, Caracas

19 Aug

Guatemala	1–1	Cuba
Fernández 78'	Report	Núñez 19'

Brígido Iriarte Stadium, Caracas
Referee: Ray Osborne (Bermuda)

== Semifinal ==
Group B winner (Brazil) received a bye to the final.

21 August 1983

Uruguay	2–1	Guatemala
Peirano 48', 75'	Report	Bobadilla 78'

Brígido Iriarte Stadium, Caracas
Referee: Angelo Brassif (United States)

== Gold-medal match ==
23 August 1983

Uruguay	1–0	Brazil
Peirano 83'	Report

Brígido Iriarte Stadium, Caracas
Referee: Mario Lira (Chile)

Team details

Uruguay
Brazil

GK	José Luis Sosa
DF	Alvaro Pérez
DF	Santiago Ostolaza
DF	José Batista
DF	Abraham Yeladián
MF	Juan Rabino
MF	Vicente R. Rodríguez
MF	Ricardo Perdomo
FW	Miguel Peirano
FW	Víctor Púa
FW	Luis Heimen	(substituted off) 76'
Substitutes:
	Edgardo Martirena	(substituted on) 76'
Manager:
(Uruguay) Oscar Tabárez

GK	Hugo
DF	Heitor
DF	Everaldo
DF	Guto
DF	Jorginho
MF	Edson Souza
MF	Dunga
MF	Neto	(substituted off) a'
FW	Helinho	(substituted off) b'
FW	Marcus Vinícius
FW	Paulinho
Substitutes:
DF	Adalberto	(substituted on) a'
	Waldir	(substituted on) b'
Manager:
(Brazil) Gílson Nunes

== Awards ==
1983 Pan American Games winners

Uruguay
First title

== Statistics ==
=== Goalscorers ===
There were 26 goals scored in 14 matches, for an average of 1.86 goals per match.

3 goals

- (Guatemala) José Bobadilla
- (Uruguay) Miguel Peirano

2 goals

- (Brazil) Heitor Camarin

1 goal

- (Bermuda) Ralph Bean
- (Bermuda) David Lambe
- (Brazil) Marcus Vinícius
- (Chile) Victor Castañeda
- (Chile) Martín Galvéz
- (Chile) Luís Vera
- (Cuba) Ramón Nuñez
- (Guatemala) Walter Claverí
- (Guatemala) Jorge Fernández
- (Guatemala) Julio Gómez
- (Mexico) César Meza
- (Mexico) Joel Ruíz
- (United States) Dave McDaniel
- (Uruguay) Aldo Azzinari
- (Uruguay) José Batista
- (Venezuela) Rodolfo Carvajal
- (Venezuela) Johnny Castellanos
- (Venezuela) Iker Zubizarreta

Source: PanamSports

== Squads ==
=== Uruguay ===
José Luis Sosa, Mario Picún, Gualberto de los Santos, Álvaro Pérez, José Batista, Juan Rabino, Abraham Yeladián, Santiago Ostolaza, Rudy Rodríguez, Ricardo Perdomo, Daniel Carreño, Luis Heimen, Carlos Larrañaga, Víctor Púa, Edgardo Martirena, Aldo Azzinari, Julio Rivadavia, Miguel Ángel Peirano.

=== Brazil ===
Hugo Duarte, João Brigatti, Heitor, Jorginho, Édson Bonifácio, José Bagitini, Everaldo Rogelio, Adalberto Machado, Édson de Souza, Dunga, Paulo Bellotti, Maurício Villela, Hélio de Conceição, Waldir de Carvalho, Paulinho Carioca, Paulo Pereira, Neto, Marcus do Nascimento.

=== Guatemala ===
Edgar Jerez, David Gardiner, Edgar Salguero, Guillermo Rodríguez, Julio Gómez, Benjamín Monterroso, Rubén Paredes, Jorge Fernández, José Bobadilla, Eddy Alburez, Byron Pérez, Boris Ortiz, Víctor Hugo Monzón, Julio de la Roca, Wálter Claverie, Hermenegildo Castro, Víctor Hugo Méndez, Otto Mynor Méndez.

=== Argentina ===
Mario Bernio, Jorge Ceballos, Héctor Cejas, Duilio Dagametti, Esteban Del Río, Gustavo Dezotti, Juan Gilberto Funes, Rodolfo Garnica, Eugenio Gentile, Francisco Guillén (GK), Humberto Gutiérrez, Ariel Moreno, Juan José Oficialdegui, Oscar Olivera, Norberto Ortega Sánchez, Carlos Prono (GK), Esteban Solaberrieta, Jorge Theiler. Head coach: Carlos Pachamé
