= Walter Claverí =

Guatemalan football coach

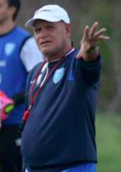
- Claverí in 2016

Personal information
- Full name: Walter Enrique Claverí Alvarado
- Date of birth: 24 November 1957 (age 68)
- Place of birth: San Pablo Jocopilas, Guatemala

Managerial career
- Years: Team
- 2013–2016: Suchitepéquez
- 2016: Guatemala
- 2016–2017: Suchitepéquez
- 2018: Xelajú
- 2018–2019: Guatemala
- 2020: Xelajú
- 2023: Malacateco
Medal record
Men's football
Representing Guatemala
Pan American Games
Bronze medal – third place	1983 Caracas	Team

Walter Enrique Claverí Alvarado (born 24 November 1957) is a Guatemalan football coach. He debuted in the 2018 FIFA World Cup qualification match against the United States. Claverí was a member of the Guatemalan team that won a bronze medal at the 1983 Pan American Games.
