= Helinho (footballer, born 1964) =

Brazilian footballer

Personal information
- Full name: Hélio Ricardo Dias da Conceição
- Date of birth: 19 October 1964 (age 62)
- Place of birth: Rio de Janeiro, Brazil
- Position: Right winger

Youth career
- –1983: Botafogo

Senior career*
| Years | Team | Apps | (Gls) |
| 1983–1988 | Botafogo | 193 | (33) |
| 1988 | → Grêmio (loan) | 16 | (2) |
| 1989 | Bangu | | |
| 1990 | Remo | | |
| 1990 | Bangu | | |
| 1991 | Madureira | | |
| 1992 | Ferroviário | | |
| 1993–1994 | Linhares | | |

International career
| 1983 | Brazil Olympic | 2 | (0) |
Medal record
Men's Football
Representing Brazil
Pan American Games
| Silver medal – second place | 1983 Caracas |
- * Club domestic league appearances and goals as of 24 November 2023

Hélio Ricardo Dias da Conceição (born 19 October 1964), simply known as Helinho, is a Brazilian former professional footballer who played as a right winger.

== Career ==
Formed in the youth categories of Botafogo FR, he became an idol of the club in the 80s, during the title drought, due to his incredible dribbling ability, compared to Garrincha. In 1988 he was loaned to Grêmio, where he was part of the Campeonato Gaucho champion team. In 1989, he left for Bangu AC de Castor de Andrade, to earn a salary around 20 times higher than what he received at Botafogo. Due to the club's decline, he did not achieve success, and the player only played for modest teams from then on.

== International career ==
In 1983, Helinho was also part of the Olympic team of Brazil, who was won the silver medal in the Caracas Pan American Games.

== Honours ==
Brazil Olympic

- Pan American Games: (silver) 1983

Grêmio

- Campeonato Gaúcho: 1988
