= Marcelo Jucá =

Brazilian swimmer (born 1963)

Personal information
- Full name: Marcelo Dias Jucá
- Born: 18 September 1963 (age 62) Rio de Janeiro, Rio de Janeiro, Brazil
- Height: 1.74 m (5 ft 9 in)
- Weight: 60 kg (132 lb)

Sport
- Sport: Swimming
- Strokes: Freestyle, Butterfly
Medal record
Men's swimming
Representing Brazil
Pan American Games
Silver medal – second place	1983 Caracas	1500m freestyle
Silver medal – second place	1983 Caracas	4x200m freestyle
Bronze medal – third place	1983 Caracas	400m freestyle

Marcelo Dias Jucá (born 18 September 1963 in Rio de Janeiro) is a former international freestyle swimmer from Brazil.

Jucá participated in the 1980 Summer Olympics, in Moscow, where he swam the 400-metre and 1500-metre freestyle, not reaching the finals.

Participated at the 1982 World Aquatics Championships in Guayaquil, where he finished 7th in the 4×200-metre freestyle final, 10th in the 1500-metre freestyle, and 22nd in the 400-metre freestyle. The conditions were adverse in Ecuador. Ricardo Prado gave a statement to a Brazilian newspaper, telling the situation: "The hotel we stayed at was not well attended. It was directly across the Guayaquil bus station. I managed to reach the final of the 200-metre individual medley, but I was weak because food there was terrible, and finished the race in eighth place." Prado landed at home with gold in the neck and a big mycosis in the belly. Djan Madruga had worse luck: he contracted typhoid.

At the 1983 Summer Universiade, in Edmonton, he finished 4th in the 400-metre and 1500-metre freestyle, and 8th in the 100-metre butterfly.

He was at the 1983 Pan American Games, in Caracas. He won two silver medals in the 1500-metre and 4×200-metre freestyle, and won the bronze medal in the 400-metre freestyle. He also finished 7th in the 100-metre butterfly.

At the 1984 Summer Olympics in Los Angeles, Jucá finished 9th in the 4×200-metre freestyle, 12th in the 4×100-metre medley, 15th in the 400-metre freestyle, and 17th in the 1500-metre freestyle.

Jucá was at the 1985 Pan Pacific Swimming Championships, the first edition of the competition, where he finished 6th in the 400-metre freestyle, and 8th in the 200-metre butterfly.

At the 1985 Summer Universiade, in Kobe, he finished 4th in the 400-metre freestyle. At this competition, Jucá broke the Brazilian record of the 100-metre butterfly, which belonged to Ricardo Prado, with a time of 56.19 seconds. This was the only Brazilian record that Jucá possessed throughout his life.
