= Jeff Kostoff =

American swimmer (born 1965)

Personal information
- Full name: Jeffrey James Kostoff
- Nickname: "Jeff"
- National team: United States
- Born: August 19, 1965 (age 61) Upland, California, U.S.
- Occupation: Collegiate Swim Coach
- Height: 6 ft 1 in (1.85 m)
- Weight: 170 lb (77 kg)
- Spouse: Carol

Sport
- Sport: Swimming
- Events: 500, 1000, 1500 freestyle 400 IM
- Strokes: Freestyle, individual medley
- Club: Industry Hills Aquatic Club
- College team: Stanford University
- Coach: Ed Spencer (Industry Hills Aquatic); Skip Kenney (Stanford); Don Gambril (84 Olympics); Randy Reese (88 Olympics)
Medal record
Men's swimming
Representing the United States
Pan American Games
Gold medal – first place	1983 Caracas	1500 m freestyle
Silver medal – second place	1983 Caracas	400 m medley

Jeffrey James Kostoff (born August 19, 1965) is an American former competition swimmer who competed for Stanford University specializing in freestyle distance events, and represented the United States at the 1984 Los Angeles Olympics and the 1988 Soul Olympics. Though failing to medal in his Olympic appearances, Kostoff held a long-standing American High School record in the 500-yard freestyle, and at one time held National High School records in both the 1000 and 1500-yard distances. After his swimming career, he worked as an age group and collegiate swimming coach.

== Early life ==
Kostoff was born August 19, 1965 in Upland, California to James and Pat Kostoff, and attended Upland High School where he graduated in 1983. As a specialist in distance swimming, he established and continued to hold for thirty years the American High School 500-yard freestyle record, from 1983-2013, and held shorter lived American High School records in the 1000 and 1500 yard distances. He swam for the Industry Hills Aquatic Club in High School under Head Distance Coach Ed Spencer where in June, 1982, he won the 800, 400, and 1500 meter freestyles, at the Meet of Champions at Mission Viejo, in Mission Viejo, California. An important early coach, Spencer began working with Kostoff in late 1980.

== Stanford University ==
Kostoff attended and competed in swimming for Stanford University, under Hall of Fame Head Coach Skip Kenney, where he was a recipient of All-American honors five times. He was an NCAA champion in the 400-meter Individual Medley in 1987. For a twenty-one year period from 1986-2007, Kostoff set and continued to hold Stanford's school record for the 1,650-yard freestyle. and held the Stanford record in the 1,650-yard freestyle for 21 years (1986–2007).

== Olympics ==
Managed by Olympic Head Coach Don Gambril at the 1984 Summer Olympics in Los Angeles, Kostoff finished in sixth place in the final of the men's 400-meter individual medley with a time of 4:23.28, just over 3 seconds behind contending for a bronze medal. Canadian Alex Baumann of Canada, a pre-Games favorite, won the gold with a world record time of 4:17.41, Brazilian swimmer Ricardo Prado took the silver with a time of 4:18.45, and Australian Rob Woodhouse took the bronze with a time of 4:20.50. As a distance specialist, many had expected Kostoff to qualify in the 1500 meter event, including his Russian rival Vladimir Salnakov. Salnikov competed with Kostoff in the 400 meter events, and considered Kostoff a talented rival to watch who had a strong chance to medal.

At the 1988 Summer Olympics in Seoul, South Korea, Kostoff advanced to the B Final of the 400-meter individual medley under Head Olympic Coach Eddie Reese and Assistant Coach Randy Reese. Kostoff finished ninth overall with a time of 4:22.95. Hungarian swimmer Tamas Darnyi took the gold with a time of 4:14.75, American Dave Wharton took the silver with a 4:17.36, and Italian Stefano Battistelli took the bronze with a 4:18.01.

=== Coaching ===
Kostoff spent four years as an Assistant swimming coach at the University of Maryland, and three seasons coaching as an Assistant at the University of Indiana from 2013-2016. He next spent three seasons as an Assistant Coach at Stanford University, his alma mater, where he led the 2017 team to a PAC-12 Conference Championship. He began as an Associate Head Coach with the University of Minnesota Swimming and Diving teams in 2018, and was still at Minnesota in 2024.

He has lived in Minnesota with his wife Carol, a hospital administrator, with whom he had two stepsons.

== See also ==
- List of Stanford University people
