= Diego Quiroga =

Ecuadorian swimmer

Personal information
- Born: 9 February 1961 (age 65)

Sport
- Sport: Swimming

Diego Quiroga (born 9 February 1961) is an Ecuadorian swimmer. He competed in two events at the 1980 Summer Olympics.
