= Peter Dobson (swimmer) =

Canadian swimmer (born 1962)

Personal information
- Born: 21 December 1962 (age 63) Peterborough, Ontario, Canada

Sport
- Sport: Swimming
Medal record
Representing Canada
Summer Universiade
Silver medal – second place	1981 Bucharest	400m individual medley

Peter Dobson (born 21 December 1962) is a Canadian former swimmer. He competed in the men's 400 metre individual medley at the 1984 Summer Olympics.
