= Cristiano Michelena =

Brazilian swimmer (born 1971)

Personal information
- Full name: Cristiano Rosito Michelena
- Born: 7 March 1971 (age 55) Rio Grande do Sul, Brazil
- Height: 1.87 m (6 ft 2 in)
- Weight: 86 kg (190 lb)

Sport
- Sport: Swimming
- Strokes: Freestyle
Medal record
Men's swimming
Representing Brazil
Pan American Games
Silver medal – second place	1987 Indianapolis	400m Freestyle
Bronze medal – third place	1987 Indianapolis	4x100m Freestyle
Bronze medal – third place	1987 Indianapolis	4x200m Freestyle

Cristiano Rositoano Michelena (born 7 March 1971) is a former international freestyle swimmer from Brazil. He was born in Rio Grande do Sul. He participated in two consecutive Summer Olympics for his native country, starting in 1988. His best result was the sixth place in the Men's 4×100-metre freestyle Relay in Barcelona, Spain.

At the 1987 Pan American Games, in Indianapolis, he won silver in the 400-metre freestyle, and bronze in the 4×100-metre freestyle and 4×200-metre freestyle. He finished 4th in the 1500-metre freestyle, and 6th in the 200-metre freestyle.

At the 1988 Summer Olympics, in Seoul, he finished 10th in the 4×200-metre freestyle, 12th in the 4×100-metre freestyle, 23rd in the 200-metre freestyle, 23rd in the 400-metre freestyle, and 26th in the 1500-metre freestyle.

On 17 April 1989, he broke the short-course South American record in the 400-metre freestyle, with a time of 3:46.39. The record was broken only in the end of 2005, by Armando Negreiros.

At the 1992 Summer Olympics, in Barcelona, he finished 6th in the 4×100-metre freestyle, 7th in the 4×200-metre freestyle, and 21st in the 200-metre freestyle.
