= Júlio López (swimmer) =

Brazilian swimmer (born 1967)

Personal information
- Full name: Júlio Cézar Rebollal Rodriguez López
- Born: 6 June 1967 (age 59) Rio de Janeiro, Rio de Janeiro, Brazil
- Height: 1.80 m (5 ft 11 in)
- Weight: 70 kg (154 lb)

Sport
- Sport: Swimming
- Strokes: Freestyle and Medley
Medal record
Men's swimming
Representing Brazil
Pan American Games
Gold medal – first place	1991 Havana	4x100m Freestyle
Bronze medal – third place	1987 Indianapolis	4x100m Freestyle
Bronze medal – third place	1987 Indianapolis	4x200m Freestyle

Júlio Cézar Rebollal Rodriguez López (born 6 June 1967 in Rio de Janeiro) is a former international freestyle and medley swimmer from Brazil. He participated for his native South American country at the 1988 Summer Olympics in Seoul, South Korea.

Participated at the 1986 World Aquatics Championships in Madrid, where he finished 23rd in the 400m medley, and 28th in the 200m medley.

He was at the 1987 Pan American Games, in Indianapolis. He won the bronze medal in the 4 × 100 m and in the 4 × 200 m free. He also finished 4th in the 200m free, and 8th in the 200m medley.

At the 1988 Summer Olympics in Seoul, he finished 10th in the 4 × 200 m free, 12th in the 4 × 100 m free, 26th in the 200m medley, and 30th in the 200m free.

Rebollal obtained his best result at the 1991 Pan American Games in Havana, where he won the gold medal in the 4 × 100 m freestyle.
