= Scott Newkirk =

US Virgin Islands swimmer (born 1961)

Personal information
- Born: July 22, 1961 (age 64)

Sport
- Sport: Swimming

Scott Newkirk (born July 22, 1961) is a swimmer who represented the United States Virgin Islands. He competed in six events at the 1984 Summer Olympics.
