= Alejandro Lecot =

Argentine swimmer

Personal information
- Born: 22 December 1962 (age 63)

Sport
- Sport: Swimming

Alejandro Lecot (born 22 December 1962) is an Argentine freestyle swimmer. He competed in two events at the 1984 Summer Olympics.
