= Roger Madruga =

Brazilian swimmer (born 1964)

Personal information
- Full name: Roger Madruga
- Nationality: Brazil
- Born: 1964 (age 61–62) Rio de Janeiro, Rio de Janeiro, Brazil

Sport
- Sport: Swimming
- Strokes: Freestyle, Medley

Roger Madruga (born 1964 in Rio de Janeiro) is a Brazilian former international freestyle and medley swimmer. He is the younger brother of Djan Madruga.

== International career ==
He competed at the 1979 Pan American Games in San Juan, where he finished 12th in the 400-metre individual medley, and 16th in both the 400-metre freestyle and the 1500-metre freestyle.

He participated at the 1982 World Aquatics Championships in Guayaquil, where he finished 8th in the 400-metre individual medley final, and 17th in the 1500-metre freestyle. The conditions were adverse in Ecuador. Ricardo Prado gave a statement to a Brazilian newspaper, describing the situation: "The hotel we stayed at was not well attended. It was directly across the Guayaquil bus station. I managed to reach the final of the 200-metre individual medley, but I was weak because food there was terrible, and finished the race in eighth place." Prado landed at home with gold in the neck and a big mycosis in the belly. Djan Madruga had worse luck: he contracted typhoid.

At the 1983 Summer Universiade in Edmonton, he finished 6th in the 400-metre individual medley.

He competed at the 1983 Pan American Games in Caracas, where he finished 5th in the 400-metre individual medley, and 8th in the 1500-metre freestyle.

He was champion of the Big Ten Conference in 1982 (400-metre individual medley - 3:57:27) and 1983 (400-metre individual medley - 3:55:34).
