= Filiberto Colon =

Puerto Rican swimmer (born 1964)

Personal information
- Born: June 23, 1964 (age 62)

Sport
- Sport: Swimming
- Strokes: Butterfly

Filiberto Colon (born 23 June 1964) is a Puerto Rican former swimmer who competed in the 1984 Summer Olympics.
