= Ricardo Prado =

Brazilian swimmer (born 1965)

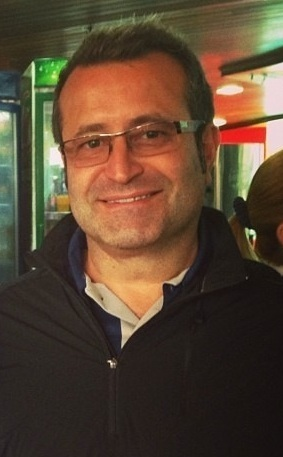
- Ricardo Prado, 2013

Personal information
- Full name: Ricardo Prado
- Born: 3 January 1965 (age 61) Andradina, SP, Brazil
- Height: 1.68 m (5 ft 6 in)
- Weight: 56 kg (123 lb)

Sport
- Sport: Swimming
- Strokes: Medley and backstroke
Medal record
Men's swimming
Representing Brazil
Olympic Games
Silver medal – second place	1984 Los Angeles	400 m medley
World Championships
Gold medal – first place	1982 Guayaquil	400 m medley
Pan American Games
Gold medal – first place	1983 Caracas	200 m medley
Gold medal – first place	1983 Caracas	400 m medley
Silver medal – second place	1983 Caracas	200 m backstroke
Silver medal – second place	1983 Caracas	200 m butterfly
Silver medal – second place	1987 Indianapolis	200 m backstroke
Bronze medal – third place	1987 Indianapolis	200 m medley
Bronze medal – third place	1987 Indianapolis	4x100 m medley
Pan Pacific Games
Gold medal – first place	1985 Tokyo	400 m medley
Bronze medal – third place	1985 Tokyo	200 m butterfly
Summer Universiade
Gold medal – first place	1985 Kobe	400 m medley
Bronze medal – third place	1983 Edmonton	200 m medley
Bronze medal – third place	1983 Edmonton	400 m medley
Bronze medal – third place	1985 Kobe	200 m medley

Ricardo Prado (born 3 January 1965 in Andradina, São Paulo, Brazil) is an Olympic and former World Record holding medley swimmer from Brazil. He was one of the greatest swimmers in the history of Brazil and the best Brazilian swimmer in the 1980s.

== International career ==
At just 14 years old, he participated at the 1979 Pan American Games, in San Juan, where he finished seventh in the 400-metre individual medley, and eighth in the 200-metre individual medley.

Prado participated in the 1980 Summer Olympics, in Moscow. He swam the 400-metre individual medley and the 100-metre backstroke, not reaching the final.

On 8 August 1982, at the 1982 World Aquatics Championships in Guayaquil, Prado won a gold medal in the 400-metre individual medley, with a time of 4:19.78, establishing a new world record that stood until 23 May 1984. Prado was also in four other finals: placing fourth in the 200-metre butterfly (beating the South American record), and eighth in the 200-metre individual medley, the 200-metre backstroke, and the 4×100-metre medley. Prado had chances to earn a good result also in the 200-metre individual medley, but the conditions were adverse in Ecuador. "The hotel we stayed at was not well attended. It was directly across [from] the Guayaquil bus station. I managed to reach the final of the 200-metre individual medley, but I was weak because food there was terrible, and finished the race in eighth place." Prado landed at home with gold on his neck but a big mycosis in his belly. Djan Madruga had worse luck: he contracted typhoid fever.

At the 1983 Summer Universiade, in Edmonton, Prado won two bronze medals: in the 200-metre and 400-metre individual medley races. He also finished fourth in the 200-metre backstroke, and sixth in the 200-metre butterfly.

Prado competed at the 1983 Pan American Games, in Caracas, where he won two gold medals in the 200-metre and 400-metre individual medley (beating the Pan Am Games record). He also won two silver medals: in the 200-metre backstroke, and in the 200-metre butterfly (both beating the South American record).

Prado won the silver medal in the men's 400-metre individual medley at the 1984 Summer Olympics in Los Angeles, California. He also finished fourth in the 200-metre backstroke, 12th in the 4×100-metre medley, and 17th in the 200-metre individual medley and the 200-metre butterfly.

Prado participated in the 1985 Pan Pacific Swimming Championships, the first year of the competition, where he won the gold medal in the 400-metre individual medley, and the bronze medal in the 200-metre butterfly. He also finished fourth in the 200-metre backstroke.

At the 1985 Summer Universiade, in Kobe, Prado won the gold medal in the 400-metre individual medley and the bronze medal in the 200-metre individual medley. He also finished fourth in the 200-metre backstroke and in the 200-metre butterfly.

At the 1986 World Aquatics Championships in Madrid, Prado competed in the 200-metre individual medley final, finishing seventh.

Although feeling the exhaustion of years of competition, Prado still swam at the 1987 Pan American Games, in Indianapolis, where he won a silver medal in the 200-metre backstroke, and two bronze medals in the 200-metre individual medley and the 4×100-metre medley.

Prado began to decline after losing the gold in Los Angeles 1984 to Alex Baumann. In 1987, Prado felt tired with his star status. During that year, he still swam well, earning medals in the Pan American Games, and spoke to journalists about training for the 1988 Olympics in Seoul. In early 1988, Prado's positive diagnosis for hepatitis marked the inevitable. Prado said goodbye to competitive swimming after racing for 23 years.

== Marks and records ==
In addition to beating the world record of the 400-metre individual medley, Prado held five South American individual records at the same time, at the 1983 Pan American Games in Caracas. At this competition, he broke Djan Madruga South American record in the 200-metre backstroke, with a time of 2:02.85. This record would not be broken until the 1988 Summer Olympics in Seoul by Rogério Romero, with a time of 2:02.26 in the heats. In Caracas, he also broke the South American record for the 200-metre butterfly, with a time of 1:59.00. This record was not beaten until 2003, 20 years later, by Kaio Almeida.

Prado broke the South American record in the 400-metre individual medley at the 1984 Summer Olympics, with a time of 4:18.45. This record was only beaten 20 years later, in 2004 by Thiago Pereira.

In the 200-metre individual medley, Prado broke the South American record in Clovis, California, in 1983, with a time of 2:04.10. This record lasted 20 years and was beaten in 2003 by Diogo Yabe.

== After professional swimming ==
In 2003, at 38 years old, Prado suffered a heart attack, and later had an angioplasty procedure at a hospital in Dallas, Texas.

Prado served as sports manager of the Organizing Committee of the 2007 Pan American Games in Rio de Janeiro. As of 2013, he works as sporting director of the Maria Lenk Aquatic Center in Rio de Janeiro.

Prado graduated with a Masters in Economics and in Physical education from Southern Methodist University in Dallas, Texas. In addition to his work at the Maria Lenk Aquatic Center, he currently works as a swimming coach team in Hebraica Club/Projeto Futuro. He is also a swimming commentator for the pay-TV channel ESPN Brasil.

During the period of the 2016 Summer Olympics, the in-train announcements of the Rio de Janeiro Metro were modified to feature recordings by Prado and two other former Brazilian Olympic athletes:, rower Sebastián Cuattrin, and volleyball player Dora Castanheira. The announcements would provide station names and where the passengers could exit to get to certain competition venues.

== See also ==
- World record progression 400 metres medley

Records
Preceded by (United States) Jesse Vassallo	World Record Holder; Men's 400 Individual Medley; 8 August 1982 – 23 May 1984	Succeeded by (East Germany) Jens-Peter Berndt
