= Football at the 2019 Pan American Games – Men's team squads =

The men's football tournament at the 2019 Pan American Games was held in Lima from 29 July to 10 August 2019. The eight teams involved in the tournament were required to register a squad of 18 players, including two goalkeepers.

Teams participating in the men's competition were restricted to under-22 players (born on or after 1 January 1997) with a maximum of three overage players allowed.

Overage players indicated in bold. Caps and goals as of the start of the tournament (29 July 2019) and includes only senior team statistics

== Group A ==
=== Panama ===
Head coach: Julio Dely Valdés

Three overage players were named on 11 July 2019. The 18-man squad was announced on 13 July 2019. Midfielder Justin Simons was replaced by Maikell Díaz.

| No. | Pos. | Player | Date of birth (age) | Caps | Goals | Club |
|---|---|---|---|---|---|---|
| 1 | GK | Samuel Baptista | 8 March 1998 (aged 21) | 0 | 0 | (Panamanian Football Federation) Costa del Este |
| 2 | DF | Iván Anderson | 24 November 1997 (aged 21) | 0 | 0 | (Panamanian Football Federation) Tauro |
| 3 | DF | José Garibaldi | 28 May 1997 (aged 22) | 0 | 0 | (Panamanian Football Federation) Arabe Unido |
| 4 | DF | Emmanuel Chanis | 21 December 1998 (aged 20) | 0 | 0 | (Panamanian Football Federation) Plaza Amador |
| 5 | DF | **Manuel Torres** | 21 November 1978 (aged 40) | 35 | 1 | (Panamanian Football Federation) Independiente La Chorrera |
| 6 | DF | Samir Ramírez | 27 April 1997 (aged 22) | 0 | 0 | (Panamanian Football Federation) Universitario |
| 7 | FW | Luis Zúñiga | 27 January 1997 (aged 22) | 0 | 0 | (Peruvian Football Federation) Pirata |
| 8 | MF | Adalberto Carrasquilla | 28 November 1998 (aged 20) | 1 | 0 | (Panamanian Football Federation) Tauro |
| 9 | FW | **Jorman Aguilar** | 11 September 1994 (aged 24) | 2 | 0 | (Panamanian Football Federation) Independiente La Chorrera |
| 10 | MF | Rafael Águila | 29 January 1997 (aged 22) | 0 | 0 | (Panamanian Football Federation) Veraguas |
| 11 | MF | Maikell Díaz | 16 February 2000 (aged 19) | 0 | 0 | (Panamanian Football Federation) Alianza |
| 12 | GK | Aldo Ciel | 3 December 1997 (aged 21) | 0 | 0 | (Panamanian Football Federation) Arabe Unido |
| 13 | DF | Jorge Gutiérrez | 1 September 1998 (aged 20) | 0 | 0 | (Panamanian Football Federation) Tauro |
| 14 | MF | **Abdiel Ayarza** | 12 September 1992 (aged 26) | 0 | 0 | (Panamanian Football Federation) Independiente La Chorrera |
| 15 | MF | Alejandro Ferrara | 20 September 1998 (aged 20) | 0 | 0 | (Panamanian Football Federation) Arabe Unido |
| 16 | MF | Andrés Peñalba | 8 July 1997 (aged 22) | 0 | 0 | (Panamanian Football Federation) Universitario |
| 17 | DF | Gilberto Hernández | 26 June 1997 (aged 22) | 0 | 0 | (Panamanian Football Federation) Arabe Unido |
| 18 | FW | Tomás Rodríguez | 9 March 1999 (aged 20) | 0 | 0 | (Panamanian Football Federation) Alianza |

=== Mexico ===
Head coach: Jaime Lozano

The 18-man squad was announced on 29 June 2019. Vladimir Loroña, Héctor Mascorro and Martín Rodríguez were replaced by Kevin Álvarez, Pablo López and Óscar Macías due to individual injuries. On 28 July 2019 forward Eduardo Aguirre was replaced by Diego Abella due to an injury.

| No. | Pos. | Player | Date of birth (age) | Caps | Goals | Club |
|---|---|---|---|---|---|---|
| 1 | GK | José Hernández | 1 May 1997 (aged 22) | 0 | 0 | (Mexican Football Federation) Atlas |
| 2 | DF | **Kevin Álvarez** | 15 January 1999 (aged 20) | 0 | 0 | (Mexican Football Federation) Pachuca |
| 3 | DF | **Ismael Govea** | 20 February 1997 (aged 22) | 0 | 0 | (Mexican Football Federation) Atlas |
| 4 | DF | **Johan Vásquez** | 22 October 1998 (aged 20) | 0 | 0 | (Italian Football Federation) Genoa |
| 5 | DF | Aldo Cruz | 24 September 1997 (aged 21) | 0 | 0 | (Mexican Football Federation) Tijuana |
| 6 | DF | Éric Cantú | 28 February 1999 (aged 20) | 0 | 0 | (Mexican Football Federation) Monterrey |
| 7 | FW | **Paolo Yrizar** | 6 August 1997 (aged 21) | 0 | 0 | (Mexican Football Federation) Querétaro |
| 8 | MF | Óscar Macías | 9 July 1998 (aged 21) | 0 | 0 | (Mexican Football Federation) Atlético San Luis |
| 9 | FW | **Jesús Godínez** | 20 January 1997 (aged 22) | 0 | 0 | (Mexican Football Federation) León |
| 10 | FW | Diego Abella | 22 October 1998 (aged 20) | 0 | 0 | (Mexican Football Federation) Puebla |
| 11 | MF | **Mauro Lainez** | 9 May 1996 (aged 23) | 0 | 0 | (Mexican Football Federation) Tijuana |
| 12 | GK | Luis Malagón | 2 March 1997 (aged 22) | 0 | 0 | (Mexican Football Federation) Monarcas Morelia |
| 13 | MF | Ulises Cardona | 13 November 1998 (aged 20) | 0 | 0 | (Mexican Football Federation) Atlas |
| 14 | MF | Pablo López | 7 January 1998 (aged 21) | 0 | 0 | (Mexican Football Federation) Pachuca |
| 15 | DF | **Francisco Venegas** | 16 July 1998 (aged 21) | 0 | 0 | (Mexican Football Federation) Tigres UANL |
| 16 | MF | **José Joaquín Esquivel** | 7 January 1998 (aged 21) | 0 | 0 | (Mexican Football Federation) Atlético San Luis |
| 17 | MF | Marcel Ruiz | 26 October 2000 (aged 18) | 0 | 0 | (Mexican Football Federation) Querétaro |
| 18 | DF | Brayton Vázquez | 5 March 1998 (aged 21) | 0 | 0 | (Mexican Football Federation) Atlas |

=== Ecuador ===
Head coach: (Argentina) Jorge Célico

The 18-man squad was announced on 18 July 2019. On 30 July, defender Bryan Carabalí was replaced by Jackson Porozo because Emelec denied the call of his new player Carabalí.

| No. | Pos. | Player | Date of birth (age) | Caps | Goals | Club |
|---|---|---|---|---|---|---|
| 1 | GK | Johan Lara | 28 February 1999 (aged 20) | 0 | 0 | (Ecuadorian Football Federation) Aucas |
| 2 | DF | Kevin Minda | 21 November 1998 (aged 20) | 0 | 0 | (Ecuadorian Football Federation) LDU Quito |
| 3 | DF | Jesús Luis Castillo | 26 April 1999 (aged 20) | 0 | 0 | (Ecuadorian Football Federation) Puerto Quito |
| 4 | DF | Bryan Hernandez | 20 December 1998 (aged 20) | 0 | 0 | (Ecuadorian Football Federation) América |
| 5 | MF | Jordy Alcívar | 5 August 1999 (aged 19) | 0 | 0 | (Ecuadorian Football Federation) LDU Quito |
| 6 | DF | Exon Vallecilla | 28 May 1999 (aged 19) | 0 | 0 | (Ecuadorian Football Federation) Aucas |
| 7 | FW | Luis Estupiñán | 13 May 1999 (aged 20) | 0 | 0 | (Ecuadorian Football Federation) Mushuc Runa |
| 8 | MF | José Cifuentes | 12 March 1999 (aged 20) | 0 | 0 | (United States Soccer Federation) Los Angeles FC |
| 9 | FW | Leonardo Campana | 24 July 2000 (aged 18) | 2 | 0 | (Swiss Football Association) Grasshopper |
| 10 | MF | Jordan Rezabala | 29 February 2000 (aged 19) | 0 | 0 | (Ecuadorian Football Federation) Independiente |
| 11 | FW | Daniel Segura | 17 March 1999 (aged 20) | 0 | 0 | (Ecuadorian Football Federation) América |
| 12 | GK | Gabriel Cevallos | 19 March 1998 (aged 21) | 0 | 0 | (Ecuadorian Football Federation) América |
| 13 | MF | Jefferson Arce | 29 May 2000 (aged 18) | 0 | 0 | (Ecuadorian Football Federation) LDU Quito |
| 14 | MF | Janus Vivar | 7 September 1998 (aged 20) | 0 | 0 | (Ecuadorian Football Federation) Aucas |
| 15 | MF | Anderson Naula | 22 June 1998 (aged 21) | 0 | 0 | (Ecuadorian Football Federation) Guayaquil City |
| 16 | MF | Sergio Quintero | 12 March 1999 (aged 20) | 0 | 0 | (Ecuadorian Football Federation) Imbabura |
| 17 | DF | Joao Quiñonez | 15 September 1999 (aged 19) | 0 | 0 | (Ecuadorian Football Federation) Toreros |
| 18 | DF | Jackson Porozo | 4 August 2000 (aged 18) | 0 | 0 | (Portuguese Football Federation) Boavista |

=== Argentina ===
Head coach: Fernando Batista

The 18-man squad was announced on 17 July 2019.

| No. | Pos. | Player | Date of birth (age) | Caps | Goals | Club |
|---|---|---|---|---|---|---|
| 1 | GK | Facundo Cambeses | 9 April 1997 (aged 22) | 0 | 0 | (Argentine Football Association) Banfield |
| 2 | DF | Leonel Mosevich | 4 February 1997 (aged 22) | 0 | 0 | (Portuguese Football Federation) Nacional |
| 3 | DF | Aaron Barquett | 9 March 1999 (aged 20) | 0 | 0 | (Argentine Football Association) Argentinos Juniors |
| 4 | DF | Marcelo Herrera | 3 November 1998 (aged 20) | 0 | 0 | (Argentine Football Association) San Lorenzo |
| 5 | MF | Fausto Vera | 26 March 2000 (aged 19) | 0 | 0 | (Argentine Football Association) Argentinos Juniors |
| 6 | DF | Joaquín Novillo | 19 February 1998 (aged 21) | 0 | 0 | (Argentine Football Association) Belgrano |
| 7 | FW | Carlos Valenzuela | 22 April 1997 (aged 22) | 0 | 0 | (Argentine Football Association) Barracas Central |
| 8 | DF | Nicolás Demartini | 4 November 1999 (aged 19) | 0 | 0 | (Argentine Football Association) Temperley |
| 9 | FW | Adolfo Gaich | 26 February 1999 (aged 20) | 0 | 0 | (Argentine Football Association) San Lorenzo |
| 10 | FW | Nicolás González | 6 April 1998 (aged 21) | 0 | 0 | (German Football Association) VfB Stuttgart |
| 11 | MF | Santiago Colombatto | 17 January 1997 (aged 22) | 0 | 0 | (Italian Football Federation) Cagliari |
| 12 | GK | Juan Pablo Cozzani | 9 October 1998 (aged 20) | 0 | 0 | (Argentine Football Association) Lanús |
| 13 | FW | Ignacio Aliseda | 14 March 2000 (aged 19) | 0 | 0 | (Argentine Football Association) Defensa y Justicia |
| 14 | DF | Facundo Medina | 28 May 1999 (aged 20) | 0 | 0 | (Argentine Football Association) Talleres |
| 15 | MF | Aníbal Moreno | 13 May 1999 (aged 20) | 0 | 0 | (Argentine Football Association) Newell's Old Boys |
| 16 | MF | Agustín Urzi | 4 May 2000 (aged 19) | 0 | 0 | (Argentine Football Association) Banfield |
| 17 | MF | Lucas Necul | 21 August 1999 (aged 19) | 0 | 0 | (Argentine Football Association) Arsenal de Sarandí |
| 18 | FW | Sebastián Lomonaco | 17 September 1998 (aged 20) | 0 | 0 | (Argentine Football Association) Godoy Cruz |

== Group B ==
=== Jamaica ===
Head coach: Donovan Duckie

The 18-man squad was announced on 21 July 2019. On 23 July defender Alwayne Harvey was replaced by Andre Leslie. Later, forward Alex Marshall was replaced by Sheldon McKoy.

| No. | Pos. | Player | Date of birth (age) | Caps | Goals | Club |
|---|---|---|---|---|---|---|
| 1 | GK | Jeadine White | 7 July 2000 (aged 19) | 2 | 0 | (Jamaica Football Federation) Humble Lions |
| 2 | FW | Sheldon McKoy | 3 September 1999 (aged 19) | 0 | 0 | (Jamaica Football Federation) Montego Bay United |
| 3 | MF | Tyreek Magee | 27 October 1999 (aged 19) | 2 | 0 | (Royal Belgian Football Association) Eupen |
| 4 | DF | Clifton Woodbine | 7 July 1999 (aged 20) | 0 | 0 | (Jamaica Football Federation) Cavalier |
| 5 | MF | Luca Levee | 21 February 1997 (aged 22) | 0 | 0 | (Jamaica Football Federation) Harbour View |
| 6 | DF | Ricardo Thomas | 30 August 1997 (aged 21) | 0 | 0 | (Jamaica Football Federation) Waterhouse |
| 7 | MF | Kaheem Parris | 6 January 2000 (aged 19) | 3 | 0 | (Football Association of Slovenia) Koper |
| 8 | MF | Tevin Shaw | 24 February 1997 (aged 22) | 6 | 0 | (Canadian Soccer Association) Atlético Ottawa |
| 9 | FW | Daniel Green | 10 June 1997 (aged 22) | 0 | 0 | (Jamaica Football Federation) Mount Pleasant |
| 10 | DF | Andre Leslie | 5 February 1997 (aged 22) | 0 | 0 | (Jamaica Football Federation) Waterhouse |
| 11 | FW | Jourdaine Fletcher | 23 September 1997 (aged 21) | 2 | 0 | (Jamaica Football Federation) Mount Pleasant |
| 12 | MF | Venton Evans | 19 June 1998 (aged 21) | 0 | 0 | (United States Soccer Federation) Fort Lauderdale |
| 13 | GK | Shamar Jemison | 20 April 1998 (aged 21) | 0 | 0 | Unattached |
| 14 | DF | Javain Brown | 9 March 1999 (aged 20) | 4 | 0 | (Canadian Soccer Association) Vancouver Whitecaps |
| 15 | MF | Deshane Beckford | 18 March 1998 (aged 21) | 0 | 0 | (United States Soccer Federation) Colorado Springs Switchbacks |
| 16 | MF | Leonardo Jibbison | 14 January 1999 (aged 20) | 0 | 0 | (Jamaica Football Federation) Humble Lions |
| 17 | DF | Ajeanie Talbott | 27 March 1998 (aged 21) | 2 | 0 | (Portuguese Football Federation) São João de Ver |
| 18 | MF | Lamar Walker | 5 December 1999 (aged 19) | 0 | 0 | (United States Soccer Federation) Miami FC |

=== Honduras ===
Head coach: (Uruguay) Fabián Coito.

The 18-man squad was announced on 22 July 2019.

| No. | Pos. | Player | Date of birth (age) | Caps | Goals | Club |
|---|---|---|---|---|---|---|
| 1 | GK | Enrique Facussé | 30 December 1998 (aged 20) | 0 | 0 | (United States Soccer Federation) Kentucky Wildcats |
| 2 | DF | Denil Maldonado | 26 May 1998 (aged 21) | 0 | 0 | (National Autonomous Federation of Football of Honduras) Motagua |
| 3 | DF | Elvin Oliva | 24 October 1997 (aged 21) | 0 | 0 | (National Autonomous Federation of Football of Honduras) Olimpia |
| 4 | DF | Elison Rivas | 20 November 1999 (aged 19) | 0 | 0 | (National Autonomous Federation of Football of Honduras) Real España |
| 5 | DF | Cristopher Meléndez | 25 November 1997 (aged 21) | 0 | 0 | (National Autonomous Federation of Football of Honduras) Motagua |
| 6 | DF | Ricky Zapata | 23 November 1997 (aged 21) | 0 | 0 | (National Autonomous Federation of Football of Honduras) Real Sociedad |
| 7 | MF | José Reyes | 5 November 1997 (aged 21) | 0 | 0 | (National Autonomous Federation of Football of Honduras) Olimpia |
| 8 | MF | Jorge Álvarez | 28 January 1998 (aged 21) | 0 | 0 | (National Autonomous Federation of Football of Honduras) Olimpia |
| 9 | FW | Douglas Martínez | 5 June 1997 (aged 22) | 0 | 0 | (United States Soccer Federation) Real Monarchs |
| 10 | MF | Rembrandt Flores | 12 May 1997 (aged 22) | 0 | 0 | (National Autonomous Federation of Football of Honduras) Olimpia |
| 11 | FW | Darixon Vuelto | 15 January 1998 (aged 21) | 0 | 0 | (National Autonomous Federation of Football of Honduras) Real España |
| 12 | FW | Aldo Fajardo | 13 November 1997 (aged 21) | 0 | 0 | (National Autonomous Federation of Football of Honduras) Platense |
| 13 | MF | Carlos Pineda | 23 September 1997 (aged 21) | 0 | 0 | (National Autonomous Federation of Football of Honduras) Olimpia |
| 14 | FW | Kilmar Peña | 9 March 1997 (aged 22) | 0 | 0 | (National Autonomous Federation of Football of Honduras) Lobos UPNFM |
| 15 | MF | Kervin Arriaga | 5 January 1998 (aged 21) | 0 | 0 | (National Autonomous Federation of Football of Honduras) Platense |
| 16 | DF | José García | 21 September 1998 (aged 20) | 0 | 0 | (National Autonomous Federation of Football of Honduras) Olimpia |
| 17 | MF | José Mario Pinto | 27 September 1997 (aged 21) | 0 | 0 | (National Autonomous Federation of Football of Honduras) Olimpia |
| 18 | GK | Alex Güity | 20 July 1997 (aged 22) | 0 | 0 | (National Autonomous Federation of Football of Honduras) Olimpia |

=== Uruguay ===
Head coach: Gustavo Ferreyra

The 18-man squad was announced on 28 June 2019.

| No. | Pos. | Player | Date of birth (age) | Caps | Goals | Club |
|---|---|---|---|---|---|---|
| 1 | GK | Santiago Mele | 6 September 1997 (aged 21) | 0 | 0 | (Turkish Football Federation) Osmanlıspor |
| 2 | DF | Bruno Méndez | 10 September 1999 (aged 19) | 2 | 0 | (Brazilian Football Confederation) Corinthians |
| 3 | DF | Sebastián Cáceres | 18 August 1999 (aged 19) | 0 | 0 | (Uruguayan Football Association) Liverpool |
| 4 | DF | Emiliano Ancheta | 9 June 1999 (aged 20) | 0 | 0 | (Uruguayan Football Association) Danubio |
| 5 | MF | Martín Barrios | 24 January 1999 (aged 20) | 0 | 0 | (Uruguayan Football Association) Racing |
| 6 | DF | Maximiliano Araújo | 15 February 2000 (aged 19) | 0 | 0 | (Uruguayan Football Association) Montevideo Wanderers |
| 7 | MF | Pablo Siles | 15 July 1997 (aged 22) | 0 | 0 | (Uruguayan Football Association) Danubio |
| 8 | MF | **Federico Martínez** | 28 February 1996 (aged 23) | 0 | 0 | (Uruguayan Football Association) Liverpool |
| 9 | FW | Darwin Núñez | 24 June 1999 (aged 20) | 0 | 0 | (Uruguayan Football Association) Peñarol |
| 10 | MF | Leonardo Fernández | 1 October 1998 (aged 20) | 0 | 0 | (Uruguayan Football Association) Fénix |
| 11 | FW | Ignacio Ramírez | 1 February 1997 (aged 22) | 0 | 0 | (Uruguayan Football Association) Liverpool |
| 12 | GK | Mauro Silveira | 6 May 2000 (aged 19) | 0 | 0 | (Uruguayan Football Association) Montevideo Wanderers |
| 13 | DF | Emanuel Gularte | 30 September 1997 (aged 21) | 0 | 0 | (Uruguayan Football Association) Progreso |
| 14 | MF | Francisco Ginella | 21 January 1999 (aged 20) | 0 | 0 | (Uruguayan Football Association) Montevideo Wanderers |
| 15 | MF | Facundo Waller | 9 April 1997 (aged 22) | 0 | 0 | (Uruguayan Football Association) Plaza Colonia |
| 16 | DF | Gastón Álvarez | 24 March 2000 (aged 19) | 0 | 0 | (Uruguayan Football Association) Defensor Sporting |
| 17 | FW | Leandro Suhr | 24 September 1997 (aged 21) | 0 | 0 | (Uruguayan Football Association) Plaza Colonia |
| 18 | MF | Joaquín Piquerez | 24 August 1998 (aged 20) | 0 | 0 | (Uruguayan Football Association) River Plate |

=== Peru ===
Head coach: Nolberto Solano

The 18-man squad was announced on 27 June 2019.

| No. | Pos. | Player | Date of birth (age) | Caps | Goals | Club |
|---|---|---|---|---|---|---|
| 1 | GK | **Carlos Cáceda** | 27 September 1991 (aged 27) | 6 | 0 | (Peruvian Football Federation) Melgar |
| 2 | DF | Carlos Huerto | 26 April 1999 (aged 20) | 0 | 0 | (Peruvian Football Federation) Universidad San Martín |
| 3 | DF | Gianfranco Chávez | 10 August 1998 (aged 20) | 0 | 0 | (Peruvian Football Federation) Sporting Cristal |
| 4 | DF | Jefferson Portales | 29 November 1997 (aged 21) | 0 | 0 | (Peruvian Football Federation) Universidad San Martín |
| 5 | DF | Aldair Fuentes | 25 April 1998 (aged 21) | 0 | 0 | (Peruvian Football Federation) Alianza Lima |
| 6 | MF | Jesús Barco | 9 March 1997 (aged 22) | 0 | 0 | (Peruvian Football Federation) Universitario |
| 7 | MF | Jordan Guivin | 23 February 1998 (aged 21) | 0 | 0 | (Peruvian Football Federation) Universidad San Martín |
| 8 | MF | Hideyoshi Arakaki | 2 January 1998 (aged 21) | 0 | 0 | (Peruvian Football Federation) Melgar |
| 9 | FW | **Mauricio Montes** | 22 June 1982 (aged 37) | 0 | 0 | (Peruvian Football Federation) Ayacucho |
| 10 | FW | Kevin Quevedo | 22 February 1997 (aged 22) | 0 | 0 | (Peruvian Football Federation) Alianza Lima |
| 11 | MF | Andy Polar | 17 February 1997 (aged 22) | 0 | 0 | (Peruvian Football Federation) Binacional |
| 12 | GK | Ángel Zamudio | 21 April 1997 (aged 22) | 0 | 0 | (Peruvian Football Federation) Unión Comercio |
| 13 | FW | Luis Acuy | 29 June 1998 (aged 21) | 0 | 0 | (Peruvian Football Federation) Pirata |
| 14 | MF | **Yamir Oliva** | 17 January 1996 (aged 23) | 0 | 0 | (Peruvian Football Federation) Universidad San Martín |
| 15 | DF | Eduardo Rabanal | 30 January 1997 (aged 22) | 0 | 0 | (Peruvian Football Federation) Deportivo Municipal |
| 16 | MF | Jesús Pretell | 26 March 1999 (aged 20) | 1 | 0 | (Peruvian Football Federation) Sporting Cristal |
| 17 | MF | Yuriel Celi | 20 February 2002 (aged 17) | 0 | 0 | (Peruvian Football Federation) Cantolao |
| 18 | FW | José Rivera | 8 May 1997 (aged 22) | 0 | 0 | (Peruvian Football Federation) Unión Comercio |
