= Football at the 2019 Pan American Games =

- Football pictogram
- Venue: Estadio Universidad San Marcos
- Dates: July 25 – August 10
- Competitors: 288 from 11 nations

Football competitions at the 2019 Pan American Games in Lima, Peru were held from July 25 (the day before the opening ceremony) to August 9. The venue for the competition was the Estadio Universidad San Marcos, which seats up to 32,000 spectators.

A total of eight men's and eight women's teams (each consisting up to 18 athletes) competed in each tournament. This means a total of 288 athletes competed. The men's competition was an under-22 level competition (born on or after January 1, 1997), with each team allowed up to three overage players. The women's tournament was an open competition without age restrictions.

Uruguay and Brazil were the defending men's and women's gold medalists, respectively; however, Brazil due a clash of dates with the 2019 FIFA Women's World Cup did not participate in the women's tournament to defend their title.

== Medal summary ==
=== Medal table ===
Rank	Nation	Gold	Silver	Bronze	Total
1	Argentina	1	1	0	2
2	Colombia	1	0	0	1
3	Honduras	0	1	0	1
4	Costa Rica	0	0	1	1
4	Mexico	0	0	1	1
Totals (5 entries)		2	2	2	6

=== Medalists ===
Event	Gold	Silver	Bronze
Men's tournament	Argentina; Facundo Cambeses; Leonel Mosevich; Aaron Barquett; Marcelo Herrera; Fausto Vera; Joaquín Novillo; Carlos Valenzuela; Nicolás Demartini; Adolfo Gaich; Nicolás González; Santiago Colombatto; Juan Cozzani; Ignacio Aliseda; Facundo Medina; Aníbal Moreno; Agustín Urzi; Lucas Necul; Sebastián Lomonaco	Honduras; Enrique Facusse; Denil Maldonado; Elvin Oliva; Elison Rivas; Cristopher Meléndez; Riky Zapata; José Reyes; Jorge Álvarez; Douglas Martínez; Rembrandt Flores; Darixon Vuelto; Aldo Fajardo; Carlos Pineda; Kilmar Peña; Kervin Arriaga; José García; José Pinto; Alex Guity	Mexico; José Hernández; Kevin Álvarez; Ismael Govea; Johan Vásquez; Aldo Cruz; Eric Cantú; Paolo Yrizar; Óscar Macías; José Godínez; Diego Avello; Mauro Lainez; Luis Malagón; Ulises Cardona; Pablo López; Francisco Venegas; José Joaquín Esquivel; Marcel Ruiz; Brayton Vázquez
Women's tournament	Colombia; Catalina Pérez; Manuela Vanegas; Natalia Gaitán; Diana Ospina; Isabella Echeverri; Daniela Montoya; Marcela Restrepo; Jessica Caro; Oriánica Velásquez; Leicy Santos; Catalina Usme; Stefany Castaño; Michell Lugo; Daniela Arias; Daniela Caracas; Lady Andrade; Carolina Arias; Mayra Ramírez	Argentina; Vanina Correa; Agustina Barroso; Eliana Stábile; Adriana Sachs; Vanesa Santana; Aldana Cometti; Yael Oviedo; Micaela Cabrera; Milagros Menéndez; Dalila Ippólito; Mariana Larroquette; Solana Pereyra; Virginia Gómez; Miriam Mayorga; Yamila Rodríguez; Natalie Juncos; Mariela Coronel; Gabriela Chávez	Costa Rica; Noelia Bermúdez; Gabriela Guillén; María Paula Elizondo; Mariana Benavides; Fabiola Sánchez; Carol Sánchez; Valeria del Campo; Daniela Cruz; Gloriana Villalobos; Shirley Cruz; Raquel Rodríguez; Lixy Rodríguez; Sofía Varela; Priscila Chinchilla; Stephannie Blanco; Katherine Alvarado; María Paula Salas; Priscilla Tapia

== Participating nations ==
A total of 11 countries qualified football teams. The numbers in parentheses represent the number of participants qualified.

- Argentina (36)
- Colombia (18)
- Costa Rica (18)
- Ecuador (18)
- Honduras (18)
- Jamaica (36)
- Mexico (36)
- Panama (36)
- Paraguay (18)
- Peru (36)
- Uruguay (18)

== Qualification ==
A total of eight men's teams and eight women's team qualified to compete at the games in each tournament. The host nation (Peru) qualified in each tournament, along with seven other teams in each tournament according to various qualifying criteria.

=== Men ===
Event	Dates	Location	Vacancies	Qualified
Host Nation	—N/a	—N/a	1	Peru
2019 South American U-20 Championship	17 January – 10 February	Chile	3	Ecuador; Argentina; Uruguay
2018 CONCACAF U-20 Championship	1–21 November	United States	4	Panama; Jamaica; Honduras; Mexico
Total			8	

- The top team at the 2018 CONCACAF U-20 Championship, from each of the Caribbean, Central American and North American unions qualified, the fourth spot was determined by CONCACAF at a later date.
- United States declined to participate, so Mexico qualified for the North American berth.

=== Women ===
Event	Dates	Location	Vacancies	Qualified
Host Nation	—N/a	—N/a	1	Peru
2018 Copa América Femenina (teams placed 3rd to 5th)	4–22 April	Chile	3	Argentina; Colombia; Paraguay
2018 CONCACAF Women's Championship	4–17 October	United States	4	Jamaica; Panama; Costa Rica; Mexico
Total			8	

- The top team at the 2018 CONCACAF Women's Championship, from each of the Caribbean, Central American and North American unions, qualified. The fourth spot was determined by CONCACAF at a later date.
- Mexico and Costa Rica replaced the United States and Canada, who withdrew to focus on the 2019 FIFA Women's World Cup.

== Men's competition ==
=== Group stage ===
==== Group A ====
Pos	Team	Pld	W	D	L	GF	GA	GD	Pts	Qualification
1	Mexico	3	2	1	0	4	1	+3	7	Knockout stage
2	Argentina	3	2	0	1	7	5	+2	6	Knockout stage
3	Panama	3	0	2	1	2	4	−2	2	Fifth place match
4	Ecuador	3	0	1	2	3	6	−3	1	Seventh place match

Source: Lima 2019
Rules for classification: Tie-breakers

==== Group B ====
Pos	Team	Pld	W	D	L	GF	GA	GD	Pts	Qualification
1	Uruguay	3	3	0	0	7	0	+7	9	Knockout stage
2	Honduras	3	1	1	1	5	6	−1	4	Knockout stage
3	Jamaica	3	1	0	2	3	5	−2	3	Fifth place match
4	Peru (H)	3	0	1	2	2	6	−4	1	Seventh place match

Source: Lima 2019
Rules for classification: Tie-breakers
(H) Hosts

=== Knockout stage ===
Semi-finals
7 August – Lima
Mexico	1 (2)
Honduras (p)	1 (4)
7 August – Lima
Uruguay	0
Argentina	3

Gold medal match
10 August – Lima
Honduras	1
Argentina	4
Bronze medal match
10 August – Lima
Mexico	1
Uruguay	0

== Women's competition ==
=== Group stage ===
==== Group A ====
Pos	Team	Pld	W	D	L	GF	GA	GD	Pts	Qualification
1	Paraguay	3	2	1	0	5	2	+3	7	Knockout stage
2	Colombia	3	1	2	0	4	2	+2	5	Knockout stage
3	Mexico	3	1	1	1	5	4	+1	4	Fifth place match
4	Jamaica	3	0	0	3	1	7	−6	0	Seventh place match

Source: Lima 2019
Rules for classification: Tie-breakers

==== Group B ====
Pos	Team	Pld	W	D	L	GF	GA	GD	Pts	Qualification
1	Costa Rica	3	2	1	0	6	2	+4	7	Knockout stage
2	Argentina	3	2	1	0	4	0	+4	7	Knockout stage
3	Panama	3	0	1	2	2	5	−3	1	Fifth place match
4	Peru (H)	3	0	1	2	2	7	−5	1	Seventh place match

Source: Lima 2019
Rules for classification: Tie-breakers
(H) Hosts

=== Knockout stage ===
Semi-finals
6 August
Paraguay	0
Argentina	3
6 August
Costa Rica	3
Colombia (a.e.t.)	4

Gold medal match
9 August
Argentina	1 (6)
Colombia (p)	1 (7)
Bronze medal match
9 August
Paraguay	0
Costa Rica	1

== See also ==
- Football at the 2020 Summer Olympics
