= Diego Abella =

Mexican footballer (born 1998)

Personal information
- Full name: Diego Abella Calleja
- Date of birth: 22 October 1998 (age 28)
- Place of birth: Córdoba, Veracruz, Mexico
- Height: 1.82 m (6 ft 0 in)
- Position: Forward

Team information
- Current team: Jaguares
- Number: 20

Youth career
- 2014: Santos Córdoba
- 2014–2018: Toluca

Senior career*
Years	Team	Apps	(Gls)
2018–2021	Toluca	11	(0)
2019–2020	→ Puebla (loan)	15	(1)
2021	→ Necaxa (loan)	0	(0)
2021–2022	Atlético Morelia	41	(7)
2023–2024	Tepatitlán	10	(3)
2024–	Jaguares	1	(0)

International career
2019	Mexico U23	2	(0)
Medal record
Representing Mexico
Men's football
Pan American Games
Bronze medal – third place	2019 Lima	Team
- * Club domestic league appearances and goals as of 21:23, 9 September 2024 (UTC)

Diego Abella Calleja (born 22 October 1998) is a Mexican professional footballer who plays as a forward for Jaguares.

== International career ==
Abella was called up by Jaime Lozano to participate with the under-23 team at the 2019 Pan American Games, with Mexico winning the third-place match.

== Honours ==
Morelia

- Liga de Expansión MX: Clausura 2022

Mexico U23

- Pan American Bronze Medal: 2019
