= Johan Vásquez (footballer, born 1998) =

Mexican footballer

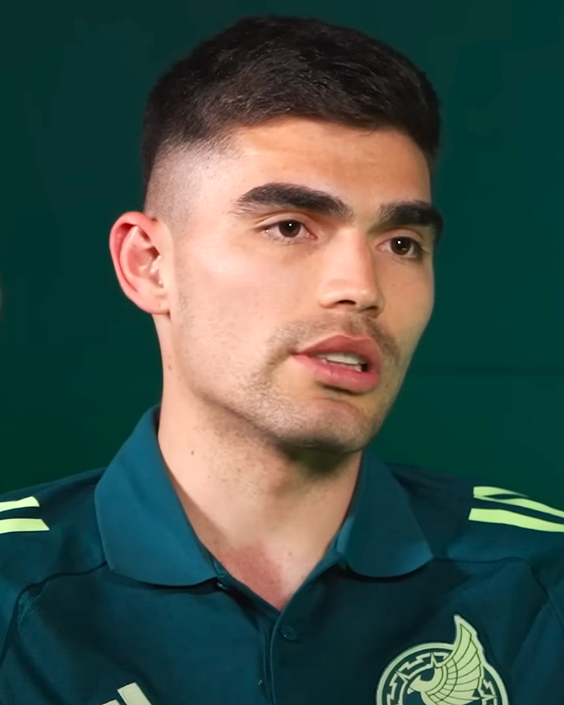
- Vásquez with Mexico in 2025

Personal information
- Full name: Johan Felipe Vásquez Ibarra
- Date of birth: 22 October 1998 (age 28)
- Place of birth: Navojoa, Sonora, Mexico
- Height: 1.84 m (6 ft 0 in)
- Position: Centre-back

Team information
- Current team: Genoa
- Number: 22

Youth career
- 2015: Tigres UANL
- 2016: Poblado Miguel Alemán FC
- 2016–2017: Sonora

Senior career*
Years	Team	Apps	(Gls)
2017–2018	Sonora	25	(0)
2018–2019	→ Monterrey (loan)	11	(1)
2019–2020	Monterrey	2	(0)
2020	→ Pumas UNAM (loan)	10	(1)
2020–2022	Pumas UNAM	39	(1)
2021–2022	→ Genoa (loan)	28	(1)
2022–	Genoa	117	(6)
2022–2023	→ Cremonese (loan)	25	(1)

International career^{‡}
2019–2021	Mexico U23	17	(3)
2019–	Mexico	54	(3)
Medal record
Representing Mexico
Men's football
CONCACAF Gold Cup
Winner	2025 United States–Canada	Team
Winner	2023 United States–Canada	Team
CONCACAF Nations League
Winner	2025 United States
Runner-up	2024 United States
Third place	2023 United States
Olympic Games
Bronze medal – third place	2020 Tokyo	Team
Olympic Qualifying Championship
Winner	2020 Mexico
Pan American Games
Bronze medal – third place	2019 Lima	Team
- * Club domestic league appearances and goals as of 19:34, 28 October 2026 (UTC) ‡ National team caps and goals as of 14 November 2026

Johan Felipe Vásquez Ibarra (born 22 October 1998) is a Mexican professional footballer who plays as a centre-back for and captains both Serie A club Genoa and the Mexico national team.

== Club career ==
=== Sonora ===
Vásquez first joined Tigres UANL youth academy in 2015. He then briefly transferred to Tercera División de México club Poblado Miguel Alemán FC in 2016 before settling in Cimarrones de Sonora, successfully going through the ranks until reaching the first team and making his professional debut in the Ascenso MX.

=== Monterrey ===
In April 2018, Vásquez joined Monterrey on a two-year loan deal with the option to buy. He was eventually purchased by Monterrey for US$2 million, making him the most expensive transfer between the top two levels of Mexican football.

Vásquez made his debut with Monterrey on 2 August in a 2–1 Copa MX home victory over Puebla. He debuted in the league on 6 October in an away 1–2 loss to Cruz Azul.

=== Pumas UNAM ===
In December 2019, following a lack of playing time, Vásquez joined Pumas UNAM on loan with the option to buy. On 12 January 2020, he made his debut with the team, appearing in the starting line up against Pachuca as the Pumas won 2–1. Two months later, following impressive performances, 50 percent of his rights were purchased by UPumas UNAM.

He solidified his place in the starting eleven, helping the team reach the Guardianes 2020 championship finals, losing against León in an aggregate 3–1. He was subsequently included in the tournament's best XI.

=== Genoa ===
==== 2021–22: Debut season ====
On 16 August 2021, Vásquez joined Serie A club Genoa on a season-long loan with an obligation to buy after one played match for a transfer fee of €3.5 million. On 17 October, Vásquez made his debut with the team in a league match against Sassuolo, scoring the equalizing goal for his team for a 2–2 draw.

==== 2022–23: Loan to Cremonese ====
On 18 June 2022, Vásquez moved to recently promoted Cremonese on loan with an option to buy. On 6 May 2023, Vásquez scored Cremonese's second goal in a 2–0 victory over Spezia. He returned to Genoa after the end of the season.

On 22 February 2024, Vásquez renewed his contract with Genoa, extending it through 2027.

==== 2024–25: Player of the season ====
On 2 March 2025, Vásquez scored the tying goal for his club against Empoli in a 1–1 draw. On 13 April, Vásquez made his 121st league appearance in a scoreless draw against Hellas Verona, surpassing Hirving Lozano as the Mexican with the most appearances in Serie A. On 11 May, in his 100th Serie A appearance with Genoa, he scored the equalizing goal in 2–2 away draw against Napoli. On 19 May, he was awarded the club's "Grifone d'Oro" for best player of the season.

Prior to the beginning of the season, he was named captain. On 15 August, Vásquez made his debut as team captain in a 3–0 home victory over Vicenza in the first round of that season's Coppa Italia. On that same month, it was reported Vásquez extended his contract through 2028.

On 26 September 2026, Vásquez scored the match-tying goal against Frosinone Calcio during the second-half but was sent-off as the match remained tied at 1. Three days later, he would score the match-winning goal after coming on as a substitute during the Coppa Italia match against Südtirol, helping them advance to the round of 16.

== International career ==
=== Youth ===
Vásquez began his international career with the under-23 side, featuring at the 2019 Pan American Games where Mexico won the bronze medal. He also participated at the 2020 CONCACAF Olympic Qualifying Championship, scoring one goal in five appearances, where Mexico won the competition. He was included in the tournament's Best XI. Vásquez was subsequently called up to participate in the 2020 Summer Olympics. He scored Mexico's second goal in a 3–1 victory over Olympic hosts, Japan, in the third-place match for the bronze medal.

=== Senior ===
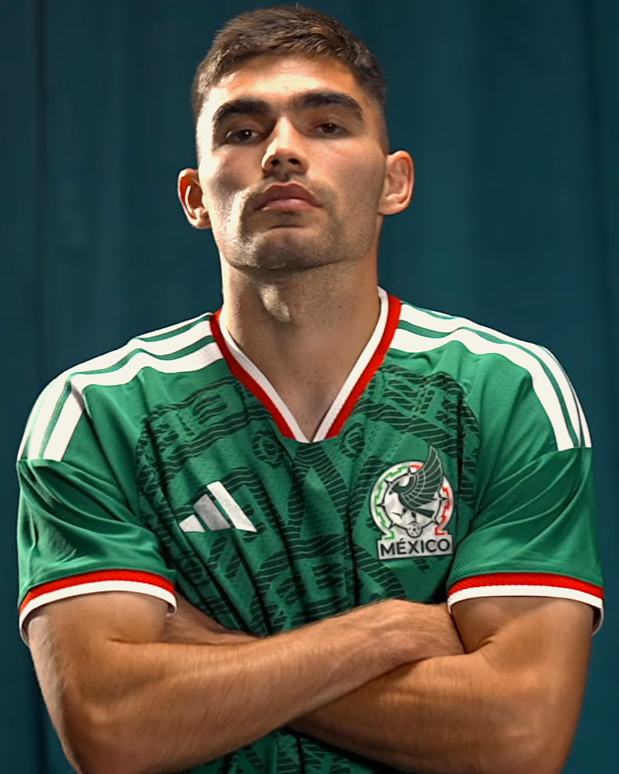
Vásquez with Mexico in 2025

On 2 October 2019, under Gerardo Martino, Vásquez made his senior national team debut in a friendly against Trinidad & Tobago. He came on as a substitute replacing Paolo Yrizar in the 63rd minute in Mexico's 2–0 win.

In October 2022, Vásquez was named in Mexico's preliminary 31-man squad for the 2022 FIFA World Cup, and in November, he was ultimately included in the final 26-man roster, but did not receive any minutes on the field during the tournament.

Vásquez was included in Jaime Lozano's roster for the 2023 Gold Cup that Mexico won, where he was included in the tournament's Best XI.

Vásquez was called up by Javier Aguirre to participate at the 2025 CONCACAF Nations League Finals and the subsequent Gold Cup in which Mexico won both after defeating both Panama and the United States, respectively. He was included in both tournament's best XI.

Vásquez was named in the 26-man squad for the 2026 FIFA World Cup, hosted on home soil. In Mexico's first match after the World Cup, manager Rafael Márquez named Vásquez as team captain against Colombia.

== Career statistics ==
=== Club ===
As of match played 28 October 2026

Appearances and goals by club, season and competition
Club	Season	League			National cup (Note: Includes Copa MX, Coppa Italia)		Continental		Other		Total	
Club	Season	Division	Apps	Goals	Apps	Goals	Apps	Goals	Apps	Goals	Apps	Goals
Sonora	2017–18	Ascenso MX	25	0	8	0	—		—		33	0
Monterrey (loan)	2018–19	Liga MX	11	1	8	0	2 (Note: Appearances in CONCACAF Champions League)	0	—		21	1
Monterrey	2019–20	Liga MX	2	0	2	0	—		1 (Note: Appearance in FIFA Club World Cup)	0	5	0
Monterrey	Monterrey total		13	1	10	0	2	0	1	0	26	1
Pumas UNAM (loan)	2019–20	Liga MX	10	1	—		—		—		10	1
Pumas UNAM	2020–21	Liga MX	39	1	—		—		—		39	1
Pumas UNAM	Pumas total		49	2	—		—		—		49	2
Genoa (loan)	2021–22	Serie A	28	1	2	0	—		—		30	1
Genoa	2023–24	Serie A	37	1	1	1	—		—		38	2
Genoa	2024–25	Serie A	36	3	1	0	—		—		37	3
Genoa	2025–26	Serie A	36	1	3	0	—		—		39	1
Genoa	2026–27	Serie A	8	1	2	1	—		—		10	2
Genoa	Genoa total		145	7	9	2	—		—		154	9
Cremonese (loan)	2022–23	Serie A	25	1	4	0	—		—		29	1
Career total			257	11	31	2	2	0	1	0	291	13

=== International ===
As of match played on 14 November 2026

Appearances and goals by national team and year
National team	Year	Apps	Goals
Mexico	2019	1	0
Mexico	2020	0	0
Mexico	2021	3	0
Mexico	2022	3	0
Mexico	2023	13	1
Mexico	2024	9	0
Mexico	2025	13	0
Mexico	2026	12	2
Total		54	3

Scores and results list Mexico's goal tally first.

List of international goals scored by Johan Vásquez
No.	Date	Venue	Opponent	Score	Result	Competition
1.	23 March 2023	Frank Essed Stadion, Paramaribo, Suriname	Suriname	1–0	2–0	2022–23 CONCACAF Nations League A
2.	30 May 2026	Rose Bowl, Pasadena, United States	Australia	1–0	1–0	Friendly
3.	4 June 2026	Estadio Nemesio Díez, Toluca, Mexico	Serbia	1–1	5–1	Friendly

== Honours ==
Monterrey

- Liga MX: Apertura 2019
- CONCACAF Champions League: 2019
- FIFA Club World Cup third place: 2019

Mexico U23

- Pan American Bronze Medal: 2019
- CONCACAF Olympic Qualifying Championship: 2020
- Olympic Bronze Medal: 2020

Mexico

- CONCACAF Gold Cup: 2023, 2025
- CONCACAF Nations League: 2024–25

Individual

- Liga MX Best XI: Guardianes 2020
- CONCACAF Olympic Qualifying Championship Best XI: 2020
- CONCACAF Gold Cup Best XI: 2023, 2025
- IFFHS CONCACAF Best XI: 2023, 2025
- CONCACAF Nations League Finals Best XI: 2025
- Genoa Grifone d'Oro: 2024–25
