= Kevin Álvarez (footballer, born 1999) =

Mexican footballer (born 1999)

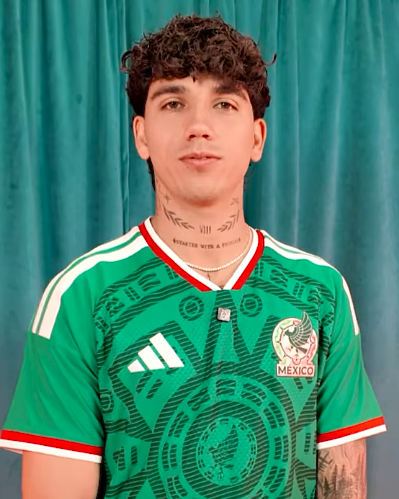
- Álvarez with Mexico in 2025

Personal information
- Full name: Kevin Nahin Álvarez Campos
- Date of birth: 15 January 1999 (age 27)
- Place of birth: Colima, Mexico
- Height: 1.78 m (5 ft 10 in)
- Position: Right-back

Team information
- Current team: América
- Number: 5

Youth career
- Pachuca

Senior career*
Years	Team	Apps	(Gls)
2018–2023	Pachuca	123	(5)
2023–	América	107	(4)

International career^{‡}
2018–2019	Mexico U20	12	(1)
2019–2021	Mexico U23	5	(1)
2021–	Mexico	18	(1)
Medal record
Men's football
Representing Mexico
CONCACAF Gold Cup
Runner-up	2021 United States	Team
CONCACAF U-20 Championship
Runner-up	2018 United States
Pan American Games
Bronze medal – third place	2019 Lima	Team
- * Club domestic league appearances and goals as of 7 November 2026 ‡ National team caps and goals as of 17 November 2026

Kevin Nahin Álvarez Campos (born 15 January 1999) is a Mexican professional footballer who plays as a right-back for Liga MX club América and the Mexico national team.

== Club career ==
Álvarez began his professional career with Pachuca, advancing through the club's youth academy before making his first-team debut in January 2018 during a Copa MX fixture against Atlético de San Luis.

In October 2022, he achieved his first professional honor as Pachuca secured the Apertura 2022 title.

In June 2023, Álvarez completed a transfer to América.

== International career ==
=== Youth ===
In April 2019, Kevin Álvarez was included in the 21-player squad to represent Mexico at the U-20 World Cup in Poland.

Kevin Álvarez was called up by Jaime Lozano to participate with the under-23 squad at the 2019 Pan American Games, with Mexico winning the third-place match.

=== Senior ===
On 3 July 2021, Kevin Álvarez made his senior national team debut in a friendly match against Nigeria.

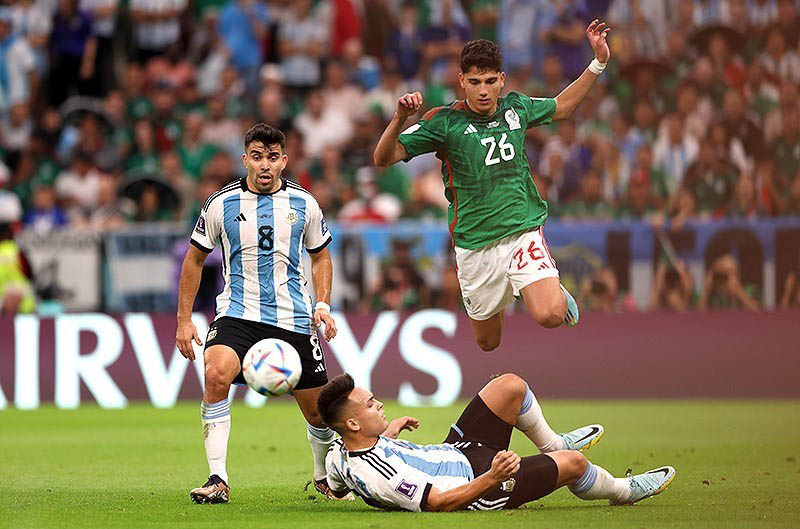
Álvarez playing against Argentina in the 2022 World Cup

In October 2022, Kevin Álvarez was named in Mexico's preliminary 31-man squad for the 2022 FIFA World Cup, and in November, he was ultimately included in the final 26-man roster.

== Career statistics ==
=== Club ===
As of match played on 7 November 2026

Club	Season	League			Cup		Continental		Global		Other		Total	
Club	Season	Division	Apps	Goals	Apps	Goals	Apps	Goals	Apps	Goals	Apps	Goals	Apps	Goals
Pachuca	2017–18	Liga MX	—		5	0	—		—		—		5	0
Pachuca	2019–20	Liga MX	10	0	5	0	—		—		—		15	0
Pachuca	2020–21	Liga MX	38	1	—		—		—		—		38	1
Pachuca	2021–22	Liga MX	37	1	—		—		—		—		37	1
Pachuca	2022–23	Liga MX	38	3	—		2 (Note: Appearances in CONCACAF Champions Cup)	0	—		—		40	3
Pachuca	Total		123	5	10	0	2	0	—		—		135	5
América	2023–24	Liga MX	32	1	—		5	0	—		4 (Note: Appearances in Leagues Cup)	2	41	3
América	2024–25	Liga MX	34	1	—		4	0	—		—		41	1
América	2025–26	Liga MX	31	1	1 (Note: One appearance in Campeón de Campeones)	0	2	0	1 (Note: Appearance in the FIFA Club World Cup play-in)	0	2	0	37	1
América	2026–27	Liga MX	12	1	—		—		—		6	0	18	1
América	Total		109	4	1	0	11	0	1	0	12	2	134	6
Career total			232	9	11	0	13	0	1	0	12	2	269	11

=== International ===
As of match played on 17 November 2026

National team	Year	Apps	Goals
Mexico	2021	2	0
Mexico	2022	8	0
Mexico	2023	5	1
Mexico	2024	0	0
Mexico	2025	1	0
Mexico	2026	2	0
Total		18	1

==== International goals ====
Scores and results list Mexico's goal tally first.

No.	Date	Venue	Opponent	Score	Result	Competition
1.	10 June 2023	Snapdragon Stadium, San Diego, United States	Cameroon	2–2	2–2	Friendly

== Honours ==
Pachuca

- Liga MX: Apertura 2022

América

- Liga MX: Apertura 2023, Clausura 2024, Apertura 2024
- Campeón de Campeones: 2024
- Campeones Cup: 2024

Mexico U23

- Pan American Bronze Medal: 2019

Mexico

- CONCACAF Nations League third place: 2022–23

Individual

- Liga MX Best XI: Guardianes 2021, Clausura 2022
- Liga MX Best Full-back: 2021–22, 2022–23
- Liga MX All-Star: 2021, 2022
