= José Santiago Hernández =

Mexican footballer (born 1997)

José Hernández
Personal information
- Full name: José Santiago Hernández García
- Date of birth: 1 May 1997 (age 29)
- Place of birth: Guadalajara, Jalisco, Mexico
- Height: 1.83 m (6 ft 0 in)
- Position: Goalkeeper

Team information
- Current team: Querétaro
- Number: 1

Youth career
- 2011–2018: Atlas

Senior career*
Years	Team	Apps	(Gls)
2018–2025	Atlas	46	(0)
2025–	Querétaro	14	(0)

International career^{‡}
2017	Mexico U20	3	(0)
2018	Mexico U21	5	(0)
2019	Mexico U23	8	(0)
Medal record
Men's football
Representing Mexico
Toulon Tournament
Third place	2019 France	Team
Runner-up	2018 France	Team
Pan American Games
Bronze medal – third place	2019 Lima	Team
- * Club domestic league appearances and goals as of 14 November 2026 ‡ National team caps and goals as of 13 August 2020

José Santiago Hernández García (born 1 May 1997) is a Mexican professional footballer who plays as a goalkeeper for Liga MX club Querétaro.

== International career ==
Hernández was included in the under-21 roster that participated in the 2018 Toulon Tournament, where Mexico would finish runners-up.

Hernández was called up by Jaime Lozano to participate with the under-22 team at the 2019 Toulon Tournament, where Mexico won third place. He was called up by Lozano again to participate at the 2019 Pan American Games, with Mexico winning the third-place match.

== Career statistics ==
=== Club ===
As of match played on 14 November 20260

Club	Season	League			Cup		Continental		Other		Total	
Club	Season	Division	Apps	Goals	Apps	Goals	Apps	Goals	Apps	Goals	Apps	Goals
Atlas	2015–16	Liga MX	—		1	0	—		—		1	0
Atlas	2017–18	Liga MX	5	0	2	0	—		—		7	0
Atlas	2018–19	Liga MX	32	0	6	0	—		—		38	0
Atlas	2019–20	Liga MX	—		2	0	—		—		2	0
Atlas	2020–21	Liga MX	1	0	1 (Note: Appearances in Copa GNP por México)	0	—		—		2	0
Atlas	2022–23	Liga MX	5	0	2 (Note: Appearances in Copa GNP por México)	0	1 (Note: Appearance in CONCACAF Champions League)	0	1 (Note: Appearances in Leagues Cup)	0	9	0
Atlas	2024–25	Liga MX	3	0	—		—		—		3	0
Atlas	Total		46	0	14	0	1	0	1	0	62	0
Querétaro	2025–26	Liga MX	13	0	—		—		1	0	14	0
Querétaro	2026–27	Liga MX	1	0	—		—		1	0	2	0
Querétaro	Total		14	0	—		—		2	0	16	0
Career total			60	0	14	0	1	0	3	0	78	0

== Honours ==
Atlas

- Liga MX: Apertura 2021, Clausura 2022
- Campeón de Campeones: 2022

Mexico U23

- Pan American Bronze Medal: 2019
