= Éric Cantú =

Mexican footballer (born 1999)

Personal information
- Full name: Éric David Cantú Guerrero
- Date of birth: 28 February 1999 (age 27)
- Place of birth: Monterrey, Nuevo León, Mexico
- Height: 1.80 m (5 ft 11 in)
- Position: Midfielder

Team information
- Current team: Durango
- Number: 5

Youth career
- 2014–2018: Monterrey

Senior career*
| Years | Team | Apps | (Gls) |
| 2018–2022 | Monterrey | 24 | (0) |
| 2021 | → Atlético San Luis (loan) | 0 | (0) |
| 2022 | → UAT (loan) | 11 | (1) |
| 2022–2023 | Raya2 | 0 | (0) |
| 2023–2025 | Atlante | 28 | (1) |
| 2026– | Durango | 1 | (0) |

International career
| 2019 | Mexico U23 | 5 | (0) |
Medal record
Representing Mexico
Men's football
Pan American Games
| Bronze medal – third place | 2019 Lima | Team competition |
- * Club domestic league appearances and goals as of 25 July 2026

Éric David Cantú Guerrero (born 28 February 1999) is a Mexican professional footballer who plays as a midfielder for Liga de Expansión MX club Durango.

== International career ==
Cantú was called up by Jaime Lozano to participate with the under-23 team at the 2019 Pan American Games, with Mexico winning the third-place match.

== Career statistics ==
=== Club ===
As of 12 April 2022

| Club | Season | League | | | Cup | | Continental | | Other | | Total | |
| Club | Season | Division | Apps | Goals | Apps | Goals | Apps | Goals | Apps | Goals | Apps | Goals |
|---|---|---|---|---|---|---|---|---|---|---|---|---|
| Monterrey | 2017–18 | Liga MX | 3 | 0 | 1 | 0 | – | | – | | 4 | 0 |
| Monterrey | 2018–19 | Liga MX | 14 | 0 | 7 | 0 | 1 (Note: Appearances in CONCACAF Champions League) | 0 | – | | 22 | 0 |
| Monterrey | 2019–20 | Liga MX | 1 | 0 | 4 | 0 | – | | – | | 5 | 0 |
| Monterrey | 2020–21 | Liga MX | 6 | 0 | – | | 1 | 0 | – | | 7 | 0 |
| Monterrey | Total | | 24 | 0 | 12 | 0 | 2 | 0 | 0 | 0 | 38 | 0 |
| UAT (loan) | 2021–22 | Liga de Expansión MX | 11 | 1 | – | | – | | – | | 11 | 1 |
| Career total | | | 35 | 1 | 12 | 0 | 2 | 0 | 0 | 0 | 49 | 1 |

== Honours ==
Monterrey

- Liga MX: Apertura 2019
- Copa MX: 2019–20
- CONCACAF Champions League: 2019, 2021

Mexico U23

- Pan American Bronze Medal: 2019
