= Brayton Vázquez =

Mexican footballer (born 1998)

Personal information
- Full name: Brayton Josué Vázquez Vélez
- Date of birth: 5 March 1998 (age 28)
- Place of birth: Zapopan, Jalisco, Mexico
- Height: 1.79 m (5 ft 10 in)
- Position: Centre-back

Team information
- Current team: Tlaxcala
- Number: 14

Youth career
- Atlas

Senior career*
Years	Team	Apps	(Gls)
2019–2023	Atlas	11	(0)
2022	→ Tampico Madero (loan)	12	(0)
2022–2023	→ Tepatitlán (loan)	28	(0)
2023	Sinaloa	10	(0)
2024	Querétaro	7	(0)
2025–2026	Atlético Morelia	41	(6)
2026–	Tlaxcala	0	(0)

International career^{‡}
2017	Mexico U20	1	(0)
2018	Mexico U21	3	(0)
2019	Mexico U23	6	(0)
Medal record
Men's football
Representing Mexico
Toulon Tournament
Third place	2019 France	Team
Pan American Games
Bronze medal – third place	2019 Lima	Team
- * Club domestic league appearances and goals as of 26 April 2026 ‡ National team caps and goals as of 10 December 2019

Brayton Josué Vázquez Vélez (born 5 March 1998) is a Mexican professional footballer who plays as a centre-back for Liga de Expansión MX club Tlaxcala.

== International career ==
=== Youth ===
Vázquez was called up for the 2017 FIFA U-20 World Cup.

Vázquez was called up by Jaime Lozano to participate with the under-22 team at the 2019 Toulon Tournament, where Mexico finished in third. He was called up by Lozano again to participate at the 2019 Pan American Games, with Mexico winning the third-place match.

== Career statistics ==
=== Club ===
As of match played 9 April 2023

Appearances and goals by club, season and competition
Club	Season	League			Cup		Continental		Other		Total	
Club	Season	Division	Apps	Goals	Apps	Goals	Apps	Goals	Apps	Goals	Apps	Goals
Atlas	2019–20	Liga MX	4	0	2	0	–		–		6	0
Atlas	2020–21	Liga MX	7	0	–		–		–		7	0
Atlas	2021–22	Liga MX	0	0	–		–		–		0	0
Atlas	Total		11	0	2	0	0	0	0	0	13	0
Tampico Madero (loan)	2021–22	Liga de Expansión MX	12	0	–		–		–		12	0
Tepatitlán (loan)	2022–23	Liga de Expansión MX	28	0	–		–		–		28	0
Career total			51	0	2	0	0	0	0	0	53	0

== Honours ==
Atlas

- Liga MX: Apertura 2021

Mexico U23

- Pan American Bronze Medal: 2019
