= Pablo López (footballer, born 1998) =

Mexican footballer

Personal information
- Full name: Pablo César López Martínez
- Date of birth: 7 January 1998 (age 28)
- Place of birth: Querétaro, Mexico
- Height: 1.66 m (5 ft 5 in)
- Position: Midfielder

Youth career
- 2012–2016: Pachuca

Senior career*
Years	Team	Apps	(Gls)
2016–2023	Pachuca	34	(3)
2020–2021	→ Atlético San Luis (loan)	14	(0)
2022–2023	→ Cancún (loan)	12	(0)
2023–2024	Tepatitlán	19	(4)
2024	Jaguares	10	(0)

International career^{‡}
2014–2015	Mexico U17	7	(2)
2017	Mexico U20	7	(0)
2019	Mexico U22	9	(0)
Medal record
Men's football
Representing Mexico
Toulon Tournament
Third place	2019 France	Team
Pan American Games
Bronze medal – third place	2019 Lima	Team
CONCACAF Under-17 Championship
First place	2015 Honduras	Team
- * Club domestic league appearances and goals as of 21 October 2022 ‡ National team caps and goals as of 23 September 2020

Pablo César López Martínez (born 7 January 1998) is a Mexican professional footballer who plays as a midfielder. He was included in The Guardian's "Next Generation 2015".

== Club career ==
López made his Liga MX debut against América on 19 November 2016, and made his Copa MX debut against Atlético San Luis on 17 February 2016.

When midfielder Érick Gutiérrez joined Dutch Eredivisie club PSV Eindhoven in 2018, López became his replacement. He scored his first goal in the professional ranks in September against Guadalajara. He started 20 games overall during the 2018–19 season.

== International career ==
=== Youth ===
López was called up for the 2017 FIFA U-20 World Cup.

López was called up by Jaime Lozano to participate with the under-22 team at the 2019 Toulon Tournament, where Mexico won third place. He was called up by Lozano again for the 2019 Pan American Games, with Mexico winning the third-place match.

== Honours ==
Mexico Youth

- CONCACAF U-17 Championship: 2015
- Pan American Bronze Medal: 2019
