= Mauro Lainez =

Mexican footballer (born 1996)

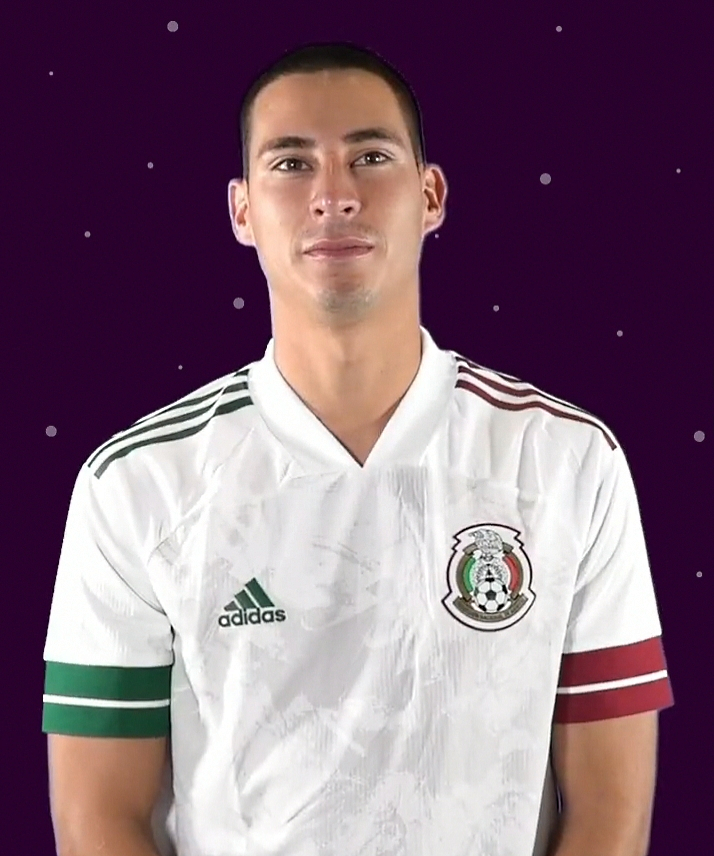
- Lainez in 2020

Personal information
- Full name: Mauro Alberto Lainez Leyva
- Date of birth: 9 May 1996 (age 30)
- Place of birth: Villahermosa, Tabasco, Mexico
- Height: 1.77 m (5 ft 9 1/2 in)
- Position: Winger

Team information
- Current team: Tigres UANL
- Number: 19

Youth career
- Pachuca

Senior career*
Years	Team	Apps	(Gls)
2016–2019	Pachuca	0	(0)
2016–2017	→ Zacatecas (loan)	48	(1)
2017–2018	→ León (loan)	2	(0)
2018–2019	→ Lobos BUAP (loan)	27	(4)
2019–2021	Tijuana	37	(3)
2021	→ América (loan)	31	(2)
2021–2024	América	14	(0)
2022–2023	→ Juárez (loan)	26	(1)
2023	→ Quéretaro (loan)	8	(0)
2024–2026	Mazatlán	52	(1)
2026–	Tigres UANL	13	(0)

International career^{‡}
2015	Mexico U20	7	(1)
2019	Mexico U23	4	(1)
2021	Mexico	1	(0)
Medal record
Representing Mexico
Men's football
Pan American Games
Bronze medal – third place	2019 Lima	Team
- * Club domestic league appearances and goals as of 21 November 2026 ‡ National team caps and goals as of 8 December 2021

Mauro Alberto Lainez Leyva (born 9 May 1996) is a Mexican professional footballer who plays as a winger for Liga MX club Tigres UANL.

== Club career ==
=== Pachuca ===
Lainez was scouted at a young age and joined Pachuca's youth academy in 2011. On 19 August 2015, under manager Diego Alonso, Lainez made his competitive debut with Pachuca in the Copa MX group stage match against Ascenso MX club Venados playing 85 mins in the 4–1 win.

=== Lobos BUAP ===
During the 17/18 season, Lainez signed on a loan deal with Lobos BUAP from Pachuca.

== International career ==
=== Youth ===
Lainez was included in the roster to be part of the 2015 CONCACAF U-20 Championship. On 8 May 2015, he was also included to form part of the final roster that will participate in the 2015 FIFA U-20 World Cup. In Mexico's third group match against Serbia, Lainez played the last 35 minutes in the team's 2–0 loss.

Lainez was called up by Jaime Lozano to participate with the under-23 team at the 2019 Pan American Games, with Mexico winning the third-place match.

=== Senior ===
In September 2020, Lainez received his first senior national team call-up by Gerardo Martino for a training camp.

Lainez received his second call-up to the senior national team, and made his debut on 8 December 2021 in a friendly match against Chile, coming in as a substitute in the 83rd minute for Sebastián Córdova.

== Career statistics ==
=== Club ===
As of match played on 21 November 2026

Club	Season	League			Cup		Continental		Other		Total	
Club	Season	Division	Apps	Goals	Apps	Goals	Apps	Goals	Apps	Goals	Apps	Goals
Pachuca	2015–16	Liga MX	—		3	0	—		—		3	0
Zacatecas (loan)	2015–16	Ascenso MX	13	0	4	1	—		—		17	1
Zacatecas (loan)	2016–17	Ascenso MX	35	1	9	0	—		—		44	1
Zacatecas (loan)	Total		48	1	13	1	—		—		61	2
León (loan)	2017–18	Liga MX	2	0	3	0	—		—		5	0
BUAP (loan)	2018–19	Liga MX	27	4	4	0	—		—		31	4
Tijuana	2019–20	Liga MX	23	3	7	0	—		—		30	3
Tijuana	2020–21	Liga MX	14	0	—		—		—		14	0
Tijuana	Total		37	3	7	0	—		—		44	3
América (loan)	2020–21	Liga MX	19	1	—		6 (Note: Appearances in CONCACAF Champions League)	0	—		25	1
América (loan)	2021–22	Liga MX	12	1	—		—		—		12	1
América (loan)	Total		31	2	—		6	0	—		37	2
América	2021–22	Liga MX	13	0	—		—		—		13	0
América	2023–24	Liga MX	1	0	—		—		—		1	0
América	Total		14	0	—		—		—		14	0
Juárez (loan)	2022–23	Liga MX	26	1	—		—		—		26	1
Quéretaro (loan)	2023–24	Liga MX	8	0	—		—		—		8	0
Mazatlán	2024–25	Liga MX	23	1	—		—		—		23	1
Mazatlán	2025–26	Liga MX	29	0	—		—		—		29	0
Mazatlán	Total		52	1	—		—		—		52	1
Tigres UANL	2026–27	Liga MX	13	0	—		—		—		13	0
Career total			258	12	30	1	6	0	0	0	294	13

=== International ===
As of match played on 8 December 2021

National team	Year	Apps	Goals
Mexico	2021	1	0
Total		1	0

== Personal life ==
Mauro's younger brother Diego is also a professional footballer. Both brothers started in Pachuca's Youth Academy. However, Mauro's brother decided to leave for América, while Mauro opted to stay at Pachuca.

== Honours ==
América

- Liga MX: Clausura 2024
- Campeón de Campeones: 2024

Mexico Youth

- CONCACAF U-20 Championship: 2015
- Pan American Bronze Medal: 2019
