= Francisco Venegas (footballer) =

Mexican footballer (born 1998)

Personal information
- Full name: Francisco Eduardo Venegas Moreno
- Date of birth: 16 July 1998 (age 28)
- Place of birth: Acámbaro, Guanajuato, Mexico
- Height: 1.82 m (5 ft 11 1/2 in)
- Position: Defender

Team information
- Current team: Pachuca (on loan from Querétaro)
- Number: 15

Youth career
- 2013–2016: Pachuca

Senior career*
Years	Team	Apps	(Gls)
2016–2018	Pachuca	2	(0)
2017	→ Everton (loan)	27	(3)
2019–2022	UANL	27	(2)
2023–2024	Mazatlán	25	(3)
2024	→ Querétaro (loan)	13	(0)
2024–	Querétaro	55	(2)
2026–	→ Pachuca (loan)	15	(1)

International career^{‡}
2015	Mexico U17	6	(3)
2017	Mexico U20	3	(0)
2019	Mexico U23	5	(2)
2019	Mexico	1	(0)
Medal record
Representing Mexico
Men's football
CONCACAF Under-17 Championship
First place	2015 Honduras	Team
Pan American Games
Bronze medal – third place	2019 Lima	Team
- * Club domestic league appearances and goals as of 21 November 2026 ‡ National team caps and goals as of 2 October 2019

Francisco Eduardo Venegas Moreno (born 16 July 1998) is a Mexican professional footballer who plays as a defender for Liga MX club Pachuca.

== International career ==
=== Youth ===
Venegas was called up for the 2017 FIFA U-20 World Cup.

Venegas was called up by Jaime Lozano to participate with the under-23 team at the 2019 Pan American Games, with Mexico winning the third-place match.

=== Senior ===
Venegas made his senior national team debut under manager Gerardo Martino on 2 October 2019 in a friendly against Trinidad and Tobago. He substituted Sebastián Córdova in the 74th minute.

== Career statistics ==
=== Club ===
As of match played on 21 November 2026

Club	Season	League			Cup		Continental		Other		Total	
Club	Season	Division	Apps	Goals	Apps	Goals	Apps	Goals	Apps	Goals	Apps	Goals
Pachuca	2016–17	Liga MX	2	0	—		1 (Note: Appearances in CONCACAF Champions League)	0	—		3	0
Everton (loan)	2017	Chilean Primera División	11	1	1	0	—		—		12	1
Everton (loan)	2018	Chilean Primera División	16	2	—		—		—		16	2
Everton (loan)	Total		27	3	1	0	—		—		28	3
UANL	2018–19	Liga MX	8	2	—		—		—		8	2
UANL	2019–20	Liga MX	4	0	—		1	0	—		5	0
UANL	2020–21	Liga MX	5	0	1 (Note: Appearances in Copa GNP por México)	0	—		1 (Note: Appearances in Leagues Cup)	0	7	0
UANL	2021–22	Liga MX	6	0	—		—		—		6	0
UANL	2022–23	Liga MX	4	0	—		—		—		4	0
UANL	Total		27	2	1	0	1	0	1	0	30	2
Mazatlán	2022–23	Liga MX	14	1	—		—		—		14	1
Mazatlán	2023–24	Liga MX	11	2	—		—		2	0	13	2
Mazatlán	Total		25	3	—		—		2	0	27	3
Querétaro (loan)	2023–24	Liga MX	13	0	—		—		—		13	0
Querétaro	2024–25	Liga MX	26	2	—		—		1	0	27	2
Querétaro	2025–26	Liga MX	29	0	—		—		2	0	31	0
Querétaro	Total		55	2	—		—		3	0	58	2
Pachuca	2026–27	Liga MX	15	1	—		—		—		15	1
Career total			164	11	2	0	2	0	6	0	174	11

=== International ===
As of match played on 2 October 2019

National team	Year	Apps	Goals
Mexico	2019	1	0
Total		1	0

== Honours ==
UANL

- Liga MX: Clausura 2019
- CONCACAF Champions League: 2020

Mexico Youth

- CONCACAF U-17 Championship: 2015
- Pan American Bronze Medal: 2019
