= Nicolás Demartini =

Argentine footballer (born 1999)

Personal information
- Full name: Nicolás Agustín Demartini
- Date of birth: 4 November 1999 (age 27)
- Place of birth: Rafael Calzada, Argentina
- Height: 1.79 m (5 ft 10 in)
- Position: Centre-back

Team information
- Current team: Barracas Central
- Number: 31

Youth career
- Temperley

Senior career*
Years	Team	Apps	(Gls)
2017–2025	Temperley	85	(1)
2021	→ Antofagasta (loan)	24	(2)
2022	→ Tigre (loan)	14	(1)
2024	→ Barracas Central (loan)	20	(2)
2025–	Barracas Central	38	(0)

International career
2018	Argentina U19		
2019	Argentina U23	1	(0)
Medal record
Representing Argentina
Men's Football
Pan American Games
Gold medal – first place	2019 Lima	Team competition
- * Club domestic league appearances and goals as of 17:10, 3 June 2026 (UTC)

Nicolás Agustín Demartini (born 4 November 1999) is an Argentine professional footballer who plays as a centre-back for who currently plays for the Barracas Central.

== Club career ==
Demartini started his career with Temperley. Gastón Esmerado promoted the defender into the club's first-team squad during the 2017–18 Primera División campaign, making appearances against Newell's Old Boys, Chacarita Juniors and Patronato from February 2018 as they were relegated; his only previous experience in senior football was as an unused substitute in the Copa Argentina versus Defensa y Justicia in August 2017. In Primera B Nacional, the second tier, Demartini started and finished the opening twenty fixtures of 2018–19, while also netting his first goal during a 2–3 home defeat to Arsenal de Sarandí on 23 September 2018.

On 15 March 2021, Demartini joined Chilean Primera División club Antofagasta on a loan deal for the rest of 2021. In January 2022, he was loaned out once again, this time to Argentine Primera División club Tigre until the end of the year.

== International career ==
In 2018, Demartini represented Argentina's U19s at the South American Games in Bolivia; as they finished fourth. A year later, Demartini was selected for the 2019 Pan American Games with the U23s in Peru. Just one appearance followed, though it occurred in the tournament's final against Honduras as Argentina won the trophy.

== Career statistics ==
As of 28 March 2019.

Appearances and goals by club, season and competition
Club	Season	League			Cup		Continental		Other		Total	
Club	Season	Division	Apps	Goals	Apps	Goals	Apps	Goals	Apps	Goals	Apps	Goals
Temperley	2017–18	Primera División	3	0	0	0	—		0	0	3	0
Temperley	2018–19	Primera B Nacional	23	1	5	0	—		0	0	28	1
Career total			26	1	5	0	—		0	0	31	1

== Honours ==
Argentina U23

- Pan American Games: 2019
