= Óscar Macías (footballer) =

Mexican footballer (born 1998)

Personal information
- Full name: Óscar Uriel Macías Mora
- Date of birth: 9 July 1998 (age 28)
- Place of birth: Guadalajara, Jalisco, Mexico
- Height: 1.75 m (5 ft 9 in)
- Position: Midfielder

Team information
- Current team: Atlético San Luis
- Number: 21

Youth career
- 2014–2017: Guadalajara

Senior career*
Years	Team	Apps	(Gls)
2017–2023	Guadalajara	7	(0)
2018	→ Zacatepec (loan)	13	(4)
2019	→ Lobos BUAP (loan)	15	(0)
2019–2020	→ Atlético San Luis (loan)	16	(1)
2020–2021	→ Tapatío (loan)	28	(8)
2021	→ Juárez (loan)	1	(0)
2022	→ Tampico Madero (loan)	16	(0)
2022–2023	→ Tapatío (loan)	50	(2)
2024–	Atlético San Luis	78	(7)

International career
2019	Mexico U23	2	(0)
Medal record
Representing Mexico
Men's football
Pan American Games
Bronze medal – third place	2019 Lima	Team competition
- * Club domestic league appearances and goals as of 20 November 2026

Óscar Uriel Macías Mora (Note: In this Spanish name, the first or paternal surname is Macías and the second or maternal family name is Mora.) (born 9 July 1998) is a Mexican professional footballer who plays as a midfielder for Liga MX club Atlético San Luis.

== Club career ==
=== Youth ===
Macías joined Guadalajara's youth academy in 2014. He continued through Chivas Youth Academy successfully going through U-17, U-20 and C.D. Guadalajara Premier. Until finally reaching the first team, Matías Almeyda being the coach promoting macías to first team.

=== Guadalajara ===
Macías made his Liga MX debut on 22 October 2017 in a 3–2 win against Veracruz.

== International career ==
Macías was called up by Jaime Lozano to participate with the under-23 squad at the 2019 Pan American Games, with Mexico winning the third-place match.

== Honours ==
Guadalajara

- CONCACAF Champions League: 2018

Tapatío

- Liga de Expansión MX: Clausura 2023

Mexico U23

- Pan American Bronze Medal: 2019
