= Ismael Govea =

Mexican footballer (born 1997)

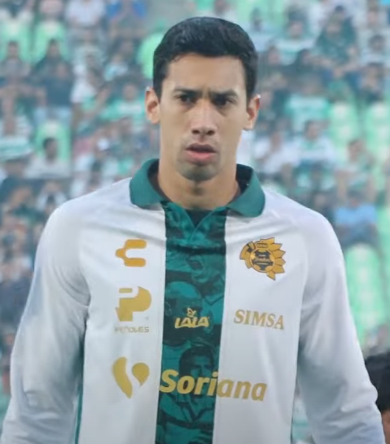
- Govea with Santos Laguna in 2023

Personal information
- Full name: Ismael Govea Solórzano
- Date of birth: 20 February 1997 (age 29)
- Place of birth: Buenavista, Michoacán, Mexico
- Height: 1.77 m (5 ft 10 in)
- Position: Right-back

Team information
- Current team: Tlaxcala
- Number: 1

Youth career
- 2013–2014: Limoneros de Apatzingán
- 2014–2018: Atlas

Senior career*
Years	Team	Apps	(Gls)
2018–2020	Atlas	56	(2)
2020–2025	Santos Laguna	54	(0)
2022–2023	→ Tijuana (loan)	27	(0)
2026–	Tlaxcala	19	(3)

International career^{‡}
2018–2019	Mexico U21	7	(0)
2019	Mexico U23	8	(1)
2019	Mexico	1	(0)
Medal record
Men's football
Representing Mexico
Toulon Tournament
Third place	2019 France	Team
Runner-up	2018 France	Team
Pan American Games
Bronze medal – third place	2019 Lima	Team competition
- * Club domestic league appearances and goals as of 30 March 2025 ‡ National team caps and goals as of 2 October 2019

Ismael Govea Solórzano (born 20 February 1997) is a Mexican professional footballer who plays as a right-back for Liga de Expansión MX club Tlaxcala.

== International career ==
Govea was included in the under-21 roster that participated in the 2018 Toulon Tournament, where Mexico would finish runners-up.

Govea was called up by Jaime Lozano to participate with the under-22 team at the 2019 Toulon Tournament, where Mexico won third place. He was called up by Lozano again to participate at the 2019 Pan American Games, with Mexico winning the third-place match.

== Career statistics ==
=== Club ===
As of 9 March 2024

Club	Season	League			Cup		Continental		Other		Total	
Club	Season	Division	Apps	Goals	Apps	Goals	Apps	Goals	Apps	Goals	Apps	Goals
Atlas	2017–18	Liga MX	7	0	2	0	–		–		9	0
Atlas	2018–19	Liga MX	27	0	6	0	–		–		33	0
Atlas	2019–20	Liga MX	22	2	2	0	–		–		24	2
Atlas	Total		56	2	10	0	—		—		66	2
Santos Laguna	2020–21	Liga MX	7	0	—		—		1 (Note: Appearances in Leagues Cup)	0	8	0
Santos Laguna	2021–22	Liga MX	9	0	—		2 (Note: Appearances in CONCACAF Champions League)	0	—		11	0
Santos Laguna	2023–24	Liga MX	26	0	–		–		1	0	27	0
Santos Laguna	Total		42	0	—		2	0	2	0	46	0
Tijuana (loan)	2022–23	Liga MX	27	0	–		–		–		27	0
Career total			125	2	10	0	2	0	2	0	139	2

=== International ===
As of match played 2 October 2019

National team	Year	Apps	Goals
Mexico	2019	1	0
Total		1	0

== Honours ==
Mexico U23

- Pan American Bronze Medal: 2019
