= Carlos Pineda (footballer) =

Honduran footballer (born 1997)

Personal information
- Full name: Carlos Enrique Pineda López
- Date of birth: 23 September 1997 (age 29)
- Place of birth: Tegucigalpa, Honduras
- Height: 1.70 m (5 ft 7 in)
- Position: Defensive midfielder

Team information
- Current team: Olimpia
- Number: 32

Youth career
- 2003–2016: Olimpia

Senior career*
Years	Team	Apps	(Gls)
2016–2025	Olimpia	41	(2)
2017–2018	→ Lobos UPNFM (loan)	1	(0)
2019	→ Real de Minas (loan)	14	(0)
2025-	Sporting FC	0	(0)

International career^{‡}
2017	Honduras U20	7	(0)
2019–	Honduras U23	5	(0)
2019–	Honduras	7	(0)
Medal record
Representing Honduras
Men's football
Pan American Games
Silver medal – second place	2019 Lima	Team competition
- * Club domestic league appearances and goals as of 22 May 2021 ‡ National team caps and goals as of 15 November 2020

Carlos Enrique Pineda López (born 23 September 1997) is a Honduran professional footballer who plays as a defensive midfielder for Sporting FC and the Honduras national team.

== Club career ==
Pineda made his debut for C.D. Olimpia on 14 February 2016, coming off the bench in the 70th minute for Óscar Salas in a 4–0 win over C.D.S. Vida.

Before the start of the 2017 Apertura tournament, Pineda joined Lobos UPNFM on a season-long loan. He made his debut on 15 October 2017 in a 3–2 away victory against Real C.D. España.

On 9 January 2019, Pineda was loaned to C.D. Real de Minas for six months.

== Honours ==
Honduras Youth

- Pan American Silver Medal: 2019
