= Paolo Yrizar =

Mexican footballer (born 1997)

Personal information
- Full name: Paolo Yrizar Martín del Campo
- Date of birth: 6 October 1997 (age 29)
- Place of birth: El Grullo, Jalisco, Mexico
- Height: 1.87 m (6 ft 2 in)
- Position: Forward

Youth career
- 2015–2016: Querétaro

Senior career*
Years	Team	Apps	(Gls)
2016–2020	Querétaro	40	(1)
2020–2021	Tijuana	3	(0)
2021	→ Toluca (loan)	9	(0)
2021	→ Dorados (loan)	19	(6)
2022	Guadalajara	5	(0)
2022	→ Tapatío (loan)	12	(4)
2023–2024	Querétaro	1	(0)
2024–2025	Atlético Morelia	15	(1)

International career
2017	Mexico U20	5	(0)
2018	Mexico U21	1	(0)
2019	Mexico U23	10	(2)
2019	Mexico	1	(0)
Medal record
Men's football
Representing Mexico
Toulon Tournament
Third place	2019 France	Team
Pan American Games
Bronze medal – third place	2019 Lima	Team
- * Club domestic league appearances and goals as of 29 March 2025

Paolo Yrizar Martín del Campo (born 6 October 1997) is a Mexican professional footballer who plays as a forward.

== International career ==
=== Youth ===
Yrizar was called up for the 2017 FIFA U-20 World Cup.

Yrizar was called up by Jaime Lozano to participate with the under-22 team at the 2019 Toulon Tournament, where Mexico won third place at the tournament. He was called up by Lozano again to participate at the 2019 Pan American Games, with Mexico winning the third-place match.

=== Senior ===
Yrizar made his senior national team debut under manager Gerardo Martino on 2 October 2019 in a friendly against Trinidad & Tobago. He started the game and was substituted in the 63rd minute. One of his shots hit the goalpost.

== Career statistics ==
=== International ===
As of match played 2 October 2019

National team	Year	Apps	Goals
Mexico	2019	1	0
Total		1	0

== Honours ==
Querétaro

- Copa MX: Apertura 2016
- Supercopa MX: 2017

Mexico U23

- Pan American Bronze Medal: 2019
