= Leonel Mosevich =

Argentine association football player

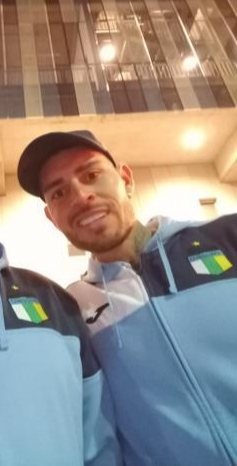
- Mosevich with O'Higgins in 2024.

Personal information
- Full name: Julio Leonel Mosevich
- Date of birth: 4 February 1997 (age 29)
- Place of birth: Lomas de Zamora, Argentina
- Height: 1.85 m (6 ft 1 in)
- Position: Centre-back

Team information
- Current team: Instituto (on loan from Argentinos Juniors)
- Number: 26

Senior career*
Years	Team	Apps	(Gls)
2015–	Argentinos Juniors	9	(0)
2018–2019	→ St. Gallen (loan)	13	(0)
2019–2020	→ Nacional (loan)	14	(1)
2020–2021	→ Vizela (loan)	7	(0)
2022	→ Patronato (loan)	28	(1)
2023	→ Instituto (loan)	22	(0)
2024	→ O'Higgins (loan)	25	(1)
2025–	→ Instituto (loan)	27	(0)

International career
2017	Argentina U20	1	(0)
2019–2021	Argentina U23	9	(0)
Medal record
Representing Argentina
Men's Football
Pan American Games
Gold medal – first place	2019 Lima	Team competition
- * Club domestic league appearances and goals as of 18:11, 10 May 2026 (UTC)

Julio Leonel Mosevich (born 4 February 1997) is an Argentine professional footballer who plays as a centre-back for Cordoban club Instituto, on loan from Argentinos Juniors.

== Club career ==
Mosevich's career started with Argentinos Juniors. He was an unused substitute in an Primera División match against Olimpo in November 2015, prior to making his professional league debut on 13 March 2016 versus Temperley.

By August 2017, Mosevich had made five appearances for Argentinos. On 30 June 2018, Swiss Super League side FC St. Gallen completed the loan signing of Mosevich. His first appearance arrived on 26 July, during a UEFA Europa League qualifying match with Sarpsborg 08. Sixteen further appearances followed in all competitions as they placed sixth in the Super League.

On 29 June 2019, a loan to Nacional of Portugal's LigaPro was agreed. He didn't appear competitively until 10 November, featuring in a victory over Covilhã. He went on to appear fourteen times, scoring his first senior goal in the process during a win against Farense on 7 December.

The club was promoted to the Primeira Liga after finishing in first place, though weren't officially deemed champions as the season was cut short due to the COVID-19 pandemic. Mosevich soon returned to Argentina, before leaving on loan to Portuguese football again on 6 October 2020 as he agreed to terms with newly promoted LigaPro team Vizela.

In January 2022, Mosevich moved to Patronato on a one-year loan deal Ahead of the 2023 season, Mosevich joined Instituto on loan until the end of 2023. The next season, he moved to Chile and joined on loan to O'Higgins.

In January 2025, Mosevich rejoined Instituto on a one-year loan. On 5 January 2026, Instituto extended the loan for another year.

== International career ==
2017 saw Mosevich called up by Argentina U20 manager Claudio Úbeda for the 2017 FIFA U-20 World Cup in South Korea.

He made his U20 debut in Argentina's final Group A match versus Guinea. A year previous he was called up for the 2016 COTIF Tournament but didn't feature.

In July 2019, Mosevich was selected by the U23s for the 2019 Pan American Games in Peru. He featured four times as they won it.

== Career statistics ==
As of 4 March 2026.

Club statistics
Club	Season	League			Cup		League Cup		Continental (Note: Includes UEFA Europa League)		Total	
Club	Season	Division	Apps	Goals	Apps	Goals	Apps	Goals	Apps	Goals	Apps	Goals
Argentinos Juniors	2015	Primera División	0	0	0	0	—		—		0	0
Argentinos Juniors	2016	Primera División	3	0	0	0	—		—		3	0
Argentinos Juniors	2016–17	Primera B Nacional	2	0	0	0	—		—		2	0
Argentinos Juniors	2017–18	Primera División	2	0	0	0	—		—		2	0
Argentinos Juniors	2018–19	Primera División	0	0	0	0	0	0	0	0	0	0
Argentinos Juniors	2019–20	Primera División	0	0	0	0	0	0	0	0	0	0
Argentinos Juniors	2020–21	Primera División	0	0	0	0	0	0	—		0	0
Argentinos Juniors	Total		7	0	0	0	0	0	0	0	7	0
FC St. Gallen (loan)	2018–19	Super League	13	0	2	0	—		2	0	17	0
Nacional (loan)	2019–20	LigaPro	14	1	0	0	0	0	—		14	1
Vizela (loan)	2020–21	Liga Portugal 2	7	0	1	0	0	0	—		3	0
Patronato (loan)	2022	Primera División	19	0	2	0	9	1	—		30	1
Instituto (loan)	2023	Primera División	20	0	0	0	2	0	—		22	0
O'Higgins (loan)	2024	Liga de Primera	25	1	0	0	—		—		25	1
Instituto (loan)	2025	Primera División	11	0	0	0	0	0	—		11	0
Instituto (loan)	2026	Primera División	8	0	0	0	0	0	—		8	0
Instituto (loan)	Total		19	0	0	0	0	0	0	0	19	0
Career total			124	2	5	0	11	1	2	0	142	3

== Honours ==
Argentinos Juniors

- Primera B Nacional: 2016–17

Argentina U23

- Pan American Games: 2019
