= Agustín Urzi =

Argentine footballer

Personal information
- Full name: Agustín José Urzi
- Date of birth: 4 May 2000 (age 26)
- Place of birth: Lomas de Zamora, Argentina
- Height: 1.68 m (5 ft 6 in)
- Position: Winger

Team information
- Current team: Levadiakos (on loan from Universidad de Concepción)
- Number: 11

Youth career
- 2008–2018: Banfield

Senior career*
Years	Team	Apps	(Gls)
2018–2022	Banfield	104	(6)
2023–2026	Juárez	22	(1)
2024	→ Racing (loan)	19	(0)
2025	→ Huracán (loan)	26	(1)
2026	→ Concepción (loan)	19	(2)
2026–	Concepción	0	(0)
2026–	→ Levadiakos (loan)	5	(0)

International career^{‡}
2018	Argentina U19		
2019	Argentina U20	4	(0)
2019–2021	Argentina U23	13	(1)
Medal record
Representing Argentina
Men's Football
Pan American Games
Gold medal – first place	2019 Lima	Team competition
- * Club domestic league appearances and goals as of 20 September 2026 ‡ National team caps and goals as of 17:30, 22 July 2021 (UTC)

Agustín José Urzi (born 4 May 2000) is an Argentine professional footballer who plays as a winger for Greek Super League club Levadiakos, on loan from Chilean side Universidad de Concepción.

== Club career ==
Urzi's career began in the system of Argentine Primera División side Banfield, joining the club's academy in 2008. He started appearing in their first-team squad during the 2018–19 season under manager Julio César Falcioni, who selected the forward on the substitutes bench on 25 November 2018, for a fixture with Racing Club; though he was unused. A week later, on 1 December, Urzi made his professional debut in a home defeat to Argentinos Juniors; featuring for the last twenty-seven minutes, having been subbed on in place of Nicolás Silva. He ended the 2018–19 campaign with goals in games against Atlético Tucumán and Newell's Old Boys.

As a player of Mexican club Juárez, Urzi moved to Chile and joined Universidad de Concepción on 27 January 2026 on a one-year loan. In July 2026, Universidad de Concepción exercised the purchase option and sent him on loan to Greek club Levadiakos.

== International career ==
Urzi trained with the Argentina U19s in March 2018. He was selected by them for the 2018 South American Games in Bolivia, a competition in which he was notably sent off during a semi-final defeat to Uruguay. Urzi was called up by Fernando Batista's U20s in May 2019 for the FIFA U-20 World Cup in Poland. He played in all four of Argentina's fixtures in Poland, as they reached the round of sixteen. Also in 2019, Urzi was picked by the U23s for the Pan American Games in Peru. Urzi appeared in four matches, including in the final against Honduras when he also scored, as they won the trophy. In 2020, Urzi scored one goal in six games as Argentina won the 2020 CONMEBOL Pre-Olympic Tournament.

== Career statistics ==
As of 24 June 2020

Club statistics
Club	Season	League			Cup		League Cup		Continental		Other		Total	
Club	Season	Division	Apps	Goals	Apps	Goals	Apps	Goals	Apps	Goals	Apps	Goals	Apps	Goals
Banfield	2018–19	Primera División	10	2	0	0	2	0	—		0	0	12	2
Banfield	2019–20	Primera División	18	0	1	0	1	0	—		0	0	20	0
Career total			28	2	1	0	3	0	—		0	0	32	2

== Honours ==
Racing Club

- Copa Sudamericana: 2024

Argentina U23

- Pan American Games: 2019
- Pre-Olympic Tournament: 2020
