= Lucas Necul =

Argentine footballer

Personal information
- Full name: Lucas Misael Necul
- Date of birth: 21 August 1999 (age 27)
- Place of birth: Puerto Madryn, Argentina
- Height: 1.71 m (5 ft 7 in)
- Positions: Attacking midfielder; winger

Team information
- Current team: Marko
- Number: 11

Youth career
- Club Comercio
- Club J.J. Moreno
- Arsenal de Sarandí

Senior career*
Years	Team	Apps	(Gls)
2018–2021	Arsenal de Sarandí	32	(2)
2021–2023	Ierapetra	13	(6)
2024	Athens Kallithea	7	(0)
2024–25	A.E. Kifisia	1	(0)
2025–2026	Chania	6	(1)
2026–	Marko	2	(0)

International career
2019	Argentina U23	5	(1)
Medal record
Representing Argentina
Men's Football
Pan American Games
Gold medal – first place	2019 Lima	Team competition
- * Club domestic league appearances and goals as of 20:00, 15 February 2026

Lucas Misael Necul (born 21 August 1999) is an Argentine professional footballer who plays as an attacking midfielder for Super League Greece 2 club Marko.

== Club career ==
Necul began his youth career with stints in Club Comercio and Club J.J. Moreno, prior to his signing with Arsenal de Sarandí. He was promoted into the Argentine Primera División side's first-team towards the end of 2017–18, participating in his debut on 14 April 2018 in a 3–0 loss to Belgrano. A further two league appearances followed during that season, which ended with relegation. In the subsequent Primera B Nacional campaign, Necul scored his first goal in a match against Ferro Carril Oeste on 2 December 2018; in a season which they concluded with promotion. In January 2024, Necul joined Athens Kallithea FC. from where he left in summer 2025.

In summer 2025 he was signed by Chania where he stayed up until January 15th 2026 where after playing 6 matches and scoring one goal, he has released as a free agent.

Subsequently, on January 16th 2026 he was signed by Marko.

== International career ==
Necul, in 2019, was selected for that year's Pan American Games in Peru by Fernando Batista's U23s. Necul netted in the final versus Honduras, as Argentina beat the Central American team to win the competition.

== Career statistics ==
As of 29 July 2019.

Club statistics
Club	Season	League			Cup		League Cup		Continental		Other		Total	
Club	Season	Division	Apps	Goals	Apps	Goals	Apps	Goals	Apps	Goals	Apps	Goals	Apps	Goals
Arsenal de Sarandí	2017–18	Primera División	3	0	1	0	—		—		0	0	4	0
Arsenal de Sarandí	2018–19	Primera B Nacional	18	1	1	0	—		—		1 (Note: Appearance(s) in the Primera B Nacional play-offs)	0	20	1
Arsenal de Sarandí	2019–20	Primera División	0	0	0	0	0	0	—		0	0	0	0
Career total			21	1	2	0	0	0	—		1	0	24	1

== Honours ==
Argentina U23

- Pan American Games: 2019
