= Sebastián Lomónaco =

Argentine footballer

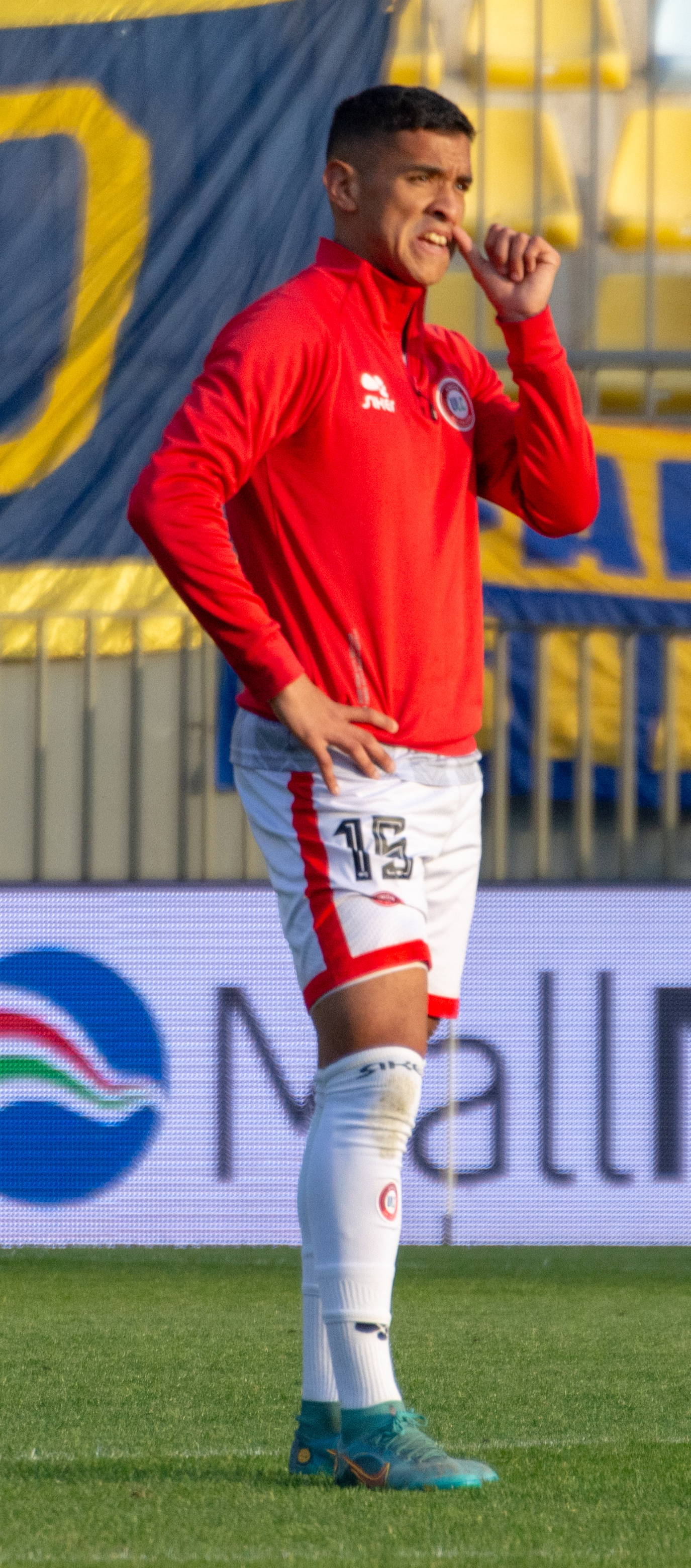
- Lomónaco with Unión La Calera in 2023

Personal information
- Full name: Sebastián Ariel Lomónaco
- Date of birth: 17 September 1998 (age 28)
- Place of birth: Avellaneda, Argentina
- Height: 1.73 m (5 ft 8 in)
- Position: Forward

Team information
- Current team: Omonia Aradippou
- Number: 31

Youth career
- Arsenal Sarandí

Senior career*
| Years | Team | Apps | (Gls) |
| 2017–2019 | Arsenal de Sarandí | 35 | (7) |
| 2019–2026 | Godoy Cruz | 40 | (4) |
| 2022 | → Arsenal de Sarandí (loan) | 38 | (11) |
| 2023 | → Unión La Calera (loan) | 27 | (4) |
| 2024–2025 | → Panetolikos (loan) | 33 | (4) |
| 2025 | → Gimnasia LP | 4 | (0) |
| 2026– | Omonia Aradippou | 10 | (3) |

International career
| 2019 | Argentina U23 | 4 | (1) |
Medal record
Representing Argentina
Men's Football
Pan American Games
| Gold medal – first place | 2019 Lima | Team competition |
- * Club domestic league appearances and goals as of 14 June 2026

Sebastián Ariel Lomónaco (born 17 September 1998) is an Argentine professional footballer who plays as a forward for Cypriot First Division club Omonia Aradippou.

== Club career ==
Lomónaco started his professional career in 2016, making his debut on 18 December for Arsenal de Sarandí in a Primera División match against Vélez Sarsfield. He scored the first goal of his career in a defeat to Olimpo on 23 February 2018. In June 2019, after scoring seven goals in thirty-six matches for Arsenal de Sarandí, Lomónaco agreed to a move to Godoy Cruz.

In the second half of 2019, he transferred to Godoy Cruz on a four-year deal.

To gain more playing time, Lomónaco was loaned out to his former club, Arsenal de Sarandí, in January 2022 until the end of the year. In 2023, he was loaned out to Chilean Primera División club Unión La Calera. The following season, he was loaned to Greek club Panetolikos on a one-year deal with an option to buy.

== International career ==
Lomónaco was called up by the Argentina U23s for the 2019 Pan American Games in Peru. He scored a goal in the group stage against Panama on 4 August. Lomónaco made four appearances as Argentina won the tournament.

== Career statistics ==
As of 4 August 2019.

Club statistics
| Club | Season | League | | | Cup | | League Cup | | Continental | | Other | | Total | |
| Club | Season | Division | Apps | Goals | Apps | Goals | Apps | Goals | Apps | Goals | Apps | Goals | Apps | Goals |
|---|---|---|---|---|---|---|---|---|---|---|---|---|---|---|
| Arsenal de Sarandí | 2016–17 | Primera División | 1 | 0 | 0 | 0 | — | | 0 | 0 | 0 | 0 | 1 | 0 |
| Arsenal de Sarandí | 2017–18 | Primera División | 12 | 3 | 1 | 0 | — | | 0 | 0 | 0 | 0 | 13 | 3 |
| Arsenal de Sarandí | 2018–19 | Primera B Nacional | 22 | 4 | 0 | 0 | — | | 0 | 0 | 0 | 0 | 22 | 4 |
| Career total | | | 35 | 7 | 1 | 0 | — | | 0 | 0 | 0 | 0 | 36 | 7 |

== Honours ==
Argentina U23

- Pan American Games: 2019
