= Joaquín Novillo =

Argentine footballer

Personal information
- Full name: Joaquín Ariel Novillo
- Date of birth: 19 February 1998 (age 28)
- Place of birth: Córdoba, Argentina
- Height: 1.90 m (6 ft 3 in)
- Position: Centre-back

Team information
- Current team: Quilmes

Youth career
- Belgrano

Senior career*
Years	Team	Apps	(Gls)
2019–2024	Belgrano	34	(2)
2021	→ Racing Club (loan)	11	(0)
2022	→ Colón (loan)	19	(0)
2023	→ Huracán (loan)	17	(0)
2023–2024	→ Vizela (loan)	0	(0)
2024–2025	Deportes Iquique	5	(0)
2025–2026	Paysandu	18	(0)
2026	Aldosivi	8	(0)
2026–	Quilmes	5	(0)

International career^{‡}
2019	Argentina U23	5	(0)
Medal record
Representing Argentina
Men's Football
Pan American Games
Gold medal – first place	2019 Lima	Team competition
- * Club domestic league appearances and goals as of 17:36, 3 October 2026 (UTC) ‡ National team caps and goals as of 26 August 2023

Joaquín Ariel Novillo (born 19 February 1998) is an Argentine professional footballer who plays as a centre-back for Quilmes.

== Club career ==
Novillo played for Belgrano at youth level, notably being selected as part of their squad for the 2016 Torneo di Viareggio in Italy. He was moved by Diego Osella into his senior squad after the 2018–19 Primera División's mid-season break, subsequently appearing for his senior bow in a goalless draw in the league with Unión Santa Fe on 27 January 2019; he participated in the full ninety minutes, picking up a yellow card in the process.

Once returning from a loan spell at Racing Club in 2021, Novillo was sent out on loan once again in January 2022, this time to Colón until the end of the year.

On 2 January 2023, Novillo signed for Huracán on a season-long loan from Belgrano, with a future option to make the move permanent.

On 14 August 2023, Belgrano sent Novillo on a season-long loan to Primeira Liga side Vizela.

In January 2024, after having failed to make any appearances for Vizela, Belgrano's loan was cancelled and he joined recently promoted to Chilean Primera División club Deportes Iquique.

== International career ==
In 2019, Novillo received an U23 call-up for Pan American Games in Peru. Argentina won the competition, as Novillo appeared in five matches.

== Career statistics ==
As of match played 15 July 2023

Appearances and goals by club, season and competition
Club	Season	League			National cup		League cup		Continental		Other		Total	
Club	Season	Division	Apps	Goals	Apps	Goals	Apps	Goals	Apps	Goals	Apps	Goals	Apps	Goals
Belgrano	2018–19	Primera División	9	0	1	0	2	0	—		—		12	0
Belgrano	2019–20	Primera Nacional	19	1	0	0	0	0	—		—		19	1
Belgrano	2020	Primera Nacional	6	1	0	0	0	0	—		—		6	1
Belgrano	Total		34	2	1	0	2	0	—		—		37	2
Racing (loan)	2021	Primera División	11	0	1	0	0	0	6 (Note: Appearance(s) in Copa Libertadores)	1	1 (Note: Appearance in Supercopa Argentina)	0	19	1
Colón (loan)	2022	Primera División	19	0	0	0	0	0	2	0	—		21	0
Huracán (loan)	2023	Primera División	17	0	0	0	0	0	4 (Note: One appearance in Copa Libertadores, three appearances and one goal in Copa Sudamericana)	1	—		21	1
Vizela (loan)	2023–24	Primeira Liga	0	0	0	0	0	0	—		—		0	0
Career total			81	2	2	0	2	0	12	2	1	0	98	4

== Honours ==
Argentina U23

- Pan American Games: 2019
