= José García (Honduran footballer) =

Honduran footballer (born 1998)

Personal information
- Full name: José Antonio García Robledo Ewan Jackson
- Date of birth: 21 September 1998 (age 28)
- Place of birth: Olanchito, Honduras
- Height: 1.84 m (6 ft 0 in)
- Position: Defender

Team information
- Current team: Olimpia
- Number: 4

Youth career
- Victoria

Senior career*
Years	Team	Apps	(Gls)
2016–2017	Victoria	0	(0)
2017–2019	Olimpia	5	(0)
2019	→ Real de Minas (loan)	18	(1)
2019–2020	Real de Minas	27	(1)
2021–	Olimpia	14	(2)

International career^{‡}
2017	Honduras U-20	8	(0)
2021	Honduras U-23	8	(0)
2021–	Honduras	1	(0)
- * Club domestic league appearances and goals as of 25 August 2021 ‡ National team caps and goals as of 2 September 2021

José Antonio García Robledo (born 21 September 1998) is a Honduran professional footballer who plays as a defender for Olimpia.

== International career ==
He represented Honduras at the 2017 CONCACAF U-20 Championship, 2017 FIFA U-20 World Cup, 2019 Pan American Games and the 2020 Summer Olympics.

He made his debut for the Honduras national football team on 2 September 2021 in a World Cup qualifier against Canada, a 1–1 away draw. He substituted Brayan Moya in the 88th minute.
