= Elvin Oliva =

Honduran footballer (born 1997)

Personal information
- Full name: Elvin Oliva Casildo
- Date of birth: 24 October 1997 (age 29)
- Place of birth: Santa Rosa de Aguan, Honduras
- Height: 1.89 m (6 ft 2 in)
- Position: Defender

Team information
- Current team: Olimpia
- Number: 3

Senior career*
Years	Team	Apps	(Gls)
2018–	Olimpia	47	(3)

International career^{‡}
2019	Honduras U23	6	(0)
- * Club domestic league appearances and goals as of 07:36, 22 May 2021 (UTC) ‡ National team caps and goals as of 23:02, 24 March 2021 (UTC)

Elvin Oliva Casildo (born 24 October 1997) is a Honduran professional footballer who plays as a defender for Liga Nacional de Honduras club Olimpia.

== Career ==
Oliva made his professional debut with Olimpia in a 1–0 Liga Nacional win over Real C.D. España on 11 August 2016.

== Honours ==
Honduras Youth

- Pan American Silver Medal: 2019
