= Carlos Valenzuela =

Argentine footballer

Personal information
- Full name: Carlos Fernando Valenzuela
- Date of birth: 22 April 1997 (age 29)
- Place of birth: Santiago del Estero, Argentina
- Height: 1.67 m (5 ft 6 in)
- Positions: Winger; forward

Senior career*
Years	Team	Apps	(Gls)
2016–2018	Racing Club	0	(0)
2016–2017	→ Nueva Chicago (loan)	13	(1)
2018–2022	Barracas Central	75	(25)
2020–2021	→ Famalicão (loan)	24	(3)
2023–2025	Tijuana	18	(1)
2025	Querétaro	2	(0)

International career
2019	Argentina U23	14	(6)
Medal record
Men's association football
Representing Argentina
Pan American Games
Gold medal – first place	2019 Lima	Team competition
- * Club domestic league appearances and goals as of 17 February 2024

Carlos Fernando Valenzuela (born 22 April 1997) is an Argentine professional footballer who plays as a winger or forward.

== Club career ==
Valenzuela was moved into the Racing Club first-team squad in April 2016; manager Facundo Sava selected him as a substitute for a victory away to Huracán but didn't use him. In July 2016, Valenzuela joined Nueva Chicago of Primera B Nacional on loan. He made his senior debut on 10 September against Douglas Haig, before scoring his first goal five appearances later in a 5–1 win over Juventud Unida. He returned to Racing Club in June 2017 following one goal in thirteen for Nueva Chicago. Primera B Metropolitana's Barracas Central signed Valenzuela on 30 June 2018. He scored three in his first four.

After twenty-four goals, including four in Primera B Nacional following promotion in 2018–19, in two seasons for Barracas Central, Valenzuela departed in August 2020 to join Portuguese Primeira Liga side Famalicão on loan. His first appearance came in a 5–1 home defeat to Benfica on 18 September, with his opening goal arriving ten days later against Belenenses SAD.

== International career ==
Valenzuela was called up to the Argentina U23s for the 2019 Pan American Games in Peru. He scored three times in the competition, netting in victories over Ecuador, Panama and Uruguay. Valenzuela netted as Argentina defeated Honduras in the final on 10 August, earning the forward a gold medal.

== Career statistics ==
As of 24 November 2020.

Club statistics
Club	Season	League			Cup		League Cup		Continental		Other		Total	
Club	Season	Division	Apps	Goals	Apps	Goals	Apps	Goals	Apps	Goals	Apps	Goals	Apps	Goals
Racing Club	2016	Primera División	0	0	0	0	—		0	0	0	0	0	0
Racing Club	2016–17	Primera División	0	0	0	0	—		0	0	0	0	0	0
Racing Club	2017–18	Primera División	0	0	0	0	—		0	0	0	0	0	0
Racing Club	Total		0	0	0	0	—		0	0	0	0	0	0
Nueva Chicago (loan)	2016–17	Primera B Nacional	13	1	0	0	—		—		0	0	13	1
Barracas Central	2018–19	Primera B Metropolitana	37	20	1	0	—		—		0	0	38	20
Barracas Central	2019–20	Primera B Nacional	18	4	1	0	—		—		0	0	19	4
Barracas Central	Total		55	25	2	0	—		0	0	0	0	57	25
Famalicão (loan)	2020–21	Primeira Liga	7	2	1	0	0	0	—		0	0	8	2
Career total			75	27	3	0	0	0	0	0	0	0	78	27

== Honours ==
Barracas Central

- Primera B Metropolitana: 2018–19

Argentina U23

- Pan American Games: 2019
