= Elison Rivas =

Honduran footballer (born 1999)

Personal information
- Full name: Elison David Rivas Mejía
- Date of birth: 20 November 1999 (age 26)
- Place of birth: Tela, Honduras
- Height: 1.78 m (5 ft 10 in)
- Position: Left-back

Team information
- Current team: Differdange 03
- Number: 24

Youth career
- Real España

Senior career*
Years	Team	Apps	(Gls)
2017– 2023	Real España	32	(2)
2020	Platense	4	(0)
2021	Real de Minas	10	
2021	Águila	17	(2)
2022–2023	Vida	43	(5)
2024	Rionegro Águilas	7	
2024–2025	Olancho	28	(2)
2025–2026	Olimpia	31	(3)
2026–	Differdange 03		

International career^{‡}
2018–2019	Honduras U20	10	(1)
2023–	Honduras	4	(0)
- * Club domestic league appearances and goals as of 06:11, 28 June 2026 (UTC) ‡ National team caps and goals as of 03:24 , 2 April 2026 (UTC)

Elison David Rivas Mejía (born 20 November 1999) is a Honduran professional footballer who plays as a left-back for Luxembourg National Division club Differdange 03 and the Honduras national team.

== Club career ==
He began his professional career developing through the reserve at Real España. He signed with the first team in mid-2017. During his multi-year tenure under contract with the club, he experienced several loan movements to maximize playing time. He moved to Platense on loan for a short spell to gain valuable top-flight minutes. Sent out on loan again, he spent the latter half of 2020 and early 2021 playing for Real de Minas. In August 2021, he signed for CD Águila in El Salvador before returning to Honduras. Rivas joined CD Vida permanently in early 2022. He split his time over the next two seasons between Vida and another loan return to Real España in late 2023.

In January 2024, Rivas signed a free-agent deal with Colombian Categoría Primera A side Águilas Doradas. Then returned to signing a transfer deal with Olancho FC where he re-established himself as a steady defensive presence. His consistent domestic performances earned him a high-profile transfer to CD Olimpia. In 2026 he joined Luxembourg club Differdange 03 under a 1-year contract.

== International career ==
Rivas represented Honduras at the 2019 FIFA U-20 World Cup. He made his national team debut during the 2023–24 CONCACAF Nations League against Cuba. He played the quarterfinals against Mexico in the 2023–24 Nations League.
