= Luis Zúñiga =

Ecuadorian writer

Luis Zúñiga is an Ecuadorian writer. He was born in Quito in 1955. He studied anthropology in Ecuador and Italy, and has worked extensively in the Andes region. He has also been a diplomatic and cultural emissary in Cuba.

He is the author of five novels:

- Manuela (1991), a historical novel about Manuela Saenz which won the Premio Nacional de novela Joaquín Gallegos Lara, and was published in Ecuador and in Colombia, Cuba, Peru and Venezuela
- Rayo (1997), Primera Mención del Jurado de la Bienal de la Novela ecuatoriana
- Extasia (2007), jury mention at the Premio Nacional Joaquín Gallegos Lara
- Un As de alto vuelo (2010)
- Karaoke

He has also written for the theatre, for example, the dramatic monologue La celebración (2009). As a poet, he has published three collections:

- Ruidos intercostales (1982)
- Del barrio a la ciudad (1985)
- Versiones (1996).
