= Jesús Pretell =

Peruvian footballer (born 1999)

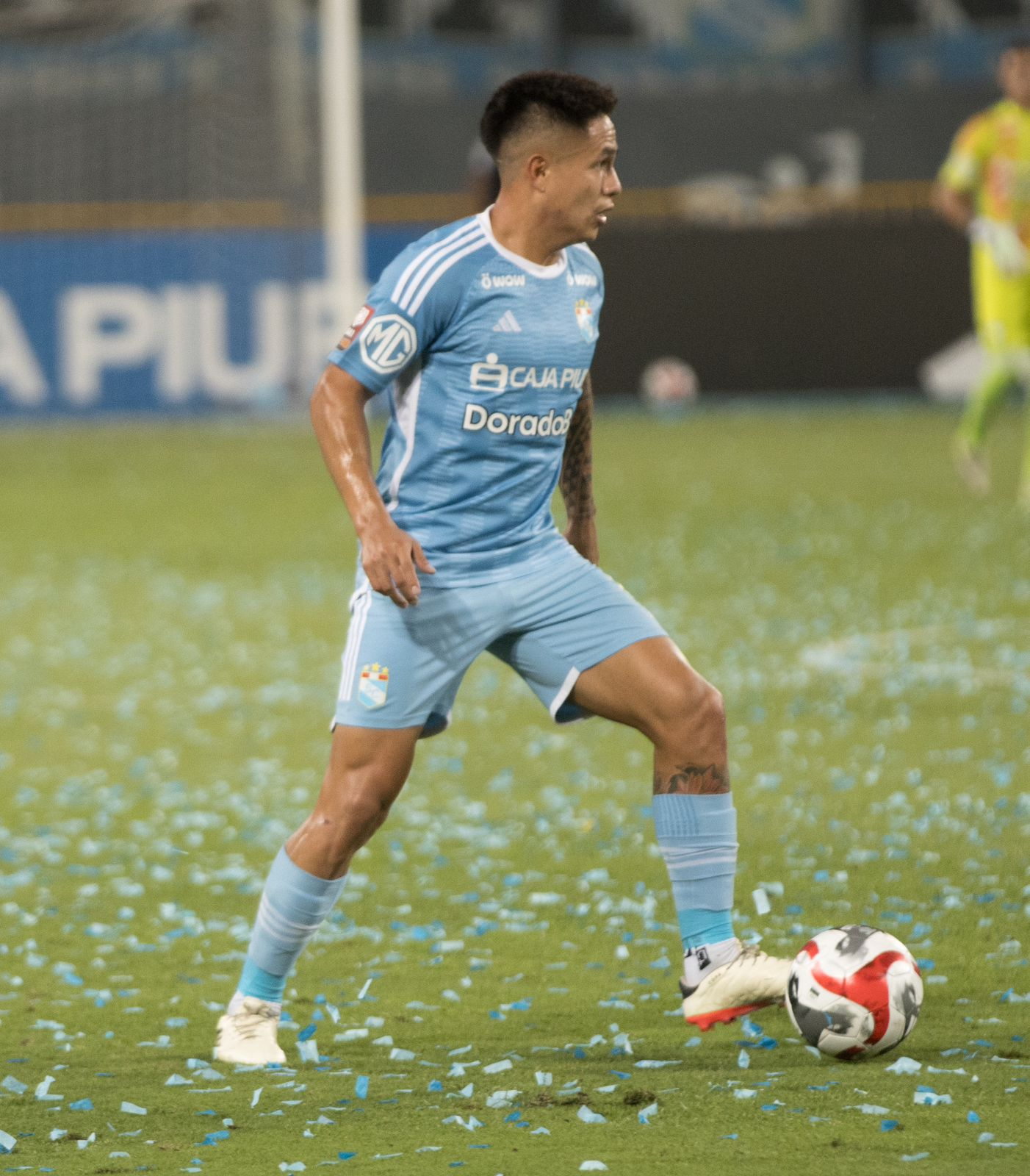
- Pretell in 2024

Personal information
- Full name: Jesús Emanuel Pretell Panta
- Date of birth: 26 March 1999 (age 27)
- Place of birth: Piura, Peru
- Height: 1.71 m (5 ft 7 in)
- Position: Midfielder

Team information
- Current team: LDU Quito
- Number: 8

Youth career
- Atlético Grau
- Sporting Cristal

Senior career*
Years	Team	Apps	(Gls)
2018–2026	Sporting Cristal	138	(1)
2018	→ USMP (loan)	33	(1)
2020	→ Melgar (loan)	10	(1)
2026–	LDU Quito	29	(1)

International career^{‡}
2019	Peru U20	4	(0)
2019	Peru U23	14	(0)
2019–	Peru	11	(0)
Medal record
Men's football
Representing Peru
Copa América
Runner-up	2019 Brazil
- * Club domestic league appearances and goals as of 22:44, 20 September 2026 (UTC) ‡ National team caps and goals as of 14 November 2026

Jesús Emanuel Pretell Panta (born 26 March 1999) is a Peruvian professional footballer who plays as a midfielder for LDU Quito and the Peru national team.

== International career ==
He made his Peruvian national team debut on 9 June 2019 in a friendly against Colombia, as a 67th-minute substitute for Renato Tapia.

== Career statistics ==
=== Club ===
As of 20 September 2026.

Club	Season	League			Cup		Continental		Other		Total	
Club	Season	Division	Apps	Goals	Apps	Goals	Apps	Goals	Apps	Goals	Apps	Goals
Sporting Cristal	2018	Liga 1	0	0	0	0	0	0	0	0	0	0
Sporting Cristal	2019	Liga 1	16	0	1	0	7 (Note: Five appearances in the Copa Libertadores, two appearances in the Copa Sudamericana)	0	0	0	24	0
Sporting Cristal	2021	Liga 1	17	0	3	0	2 (Note: Appearances in the Copa Libertadores)	0	—		22	0
Sporting Cristal	2022	Liga 1	23	1	0	0	—		1 (Note: Appearance in Liga 1 play-offs)	0	24	1
Sporting Cristal	2023	Liga 1	19	0	—		12 (Note: Ten appearances in Copa Libertadores, two appearances in Copa Sudamericana)	0	—		31	0
Sporting Cristal	2024	Liga 1	29	0	—		2	0	—		31	0
Sporting Cristal	2025	Liga 1	34	0	—		5	1	—		39	1
Sporting Cristal	Total		138	1	4	0	28	1	1	0	171	2
USMP (loan)	2018	Liga 1	33	1	0	0	0	0	0	0	33	1
Melgar (loan)	2020	Liga 1	10	0	—		1 (Note: Appearance in the Copa Sudamericana)	0	—		11	0
LDU Quito	2026	LigaPro Serie A	29	0	3	0	9	0	—		41	0
Career total			210	2	4	0	38	1	1	0	253	3

=== International ===
As of matches played 13 November 2026.

National team	Year	Apps	Goals
Peru	2019	1	0
Peru	2025	2	0
Peru	2026	8	0
Total		11	0
