= Abdiel Ayarza =

Panamanian footballer (born 1992)

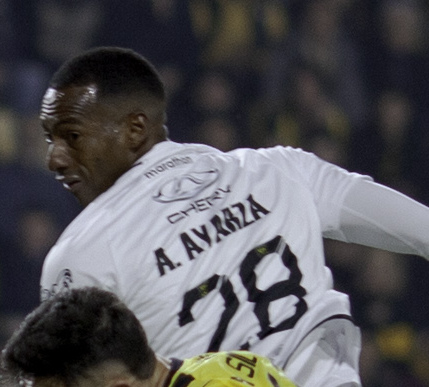

Personal information
- Full name: Abdiel Armando Ayarza Cocanegra
- Date of birth: 12 September 1992 (age 34)
- Place of birth: Colón, Panama
- Height: 1.85 m (6 ft 1 in)
- Position: Midfielder

Team information
- Current team: The Strongest
- Number: 28

Senior career*
Years	Team	Apps	(Gls)
2016–2018	Santa Gema	58	(3)
2018–2019	CAI	24	(3)
2020–2021	Cienciano	41	(15)
2022–2023	Cusco FC	52	(21)
2024	Cienciano	16	(4)
2024	CAI	0	(0)
2024–	The Strongest	16	(4)

International career^{‡}
2019	Panama U22	4	(1)
2019–	Panama	31	(4)
- * Club domestic league appearances and goals as of 30 December 2025 ‡ National team caps and goals as of 23:21, 15 October 2024 (UTC)

Abdiel Armando Ayarza Cocanegra (born 12 September 1992) is a Panamanian professional footballer who plays as midfielder for The Strongest and the Panama national team.

== Playing career ==
On 24 July 2019, Ayarza signed with Cienciano in Peru after being named the best player in the 2018–19 season of the Liga Panameña de Fútbol. Ayarza made his professional debut with Cienciano on 2 February 2020 in a 2–1 Peruvian Primera División defeat to Academia Cantolao.

== International career ==
Ayarza made his debut for the Panama national team in a 3–1 CONCACAF Nations League loss against Mexico on 15 October 2019.

He scored his first goal in a 1–0 friendly win over Costa Rica on 10 October 2020, and his second three days later, against the same opponent and with the same outcome.

== Career statistics ==
=== International ===
As of match played 15 October 2024

Appearances and goals by national team and year
National team	Year	Apps	Goals
Panama	2019	2	0
Panama	2020	4	2
Panama	2021	12	0
Panama	2022	4	1
Panama	2023	2	1
Panama	2024	9	0
Total		31	4

=== International goals ===
As of match played 17 October 2023. Panama score listed first, score column indicates score after each Ayarza goal.

List of international goals scored by Abdiel Ayarza
No.	Cap	Date	Venue	Opponent	Score	Result	Competition	Ref.
1	3	10 October 2020	Estadio Nacional de Costa Rica, San José, Costa Rica	Costa Rica	1–0	1–0	Friendly	
2	4	13 October 2020	Estadio Nacional de Costa Rica, San José, Costa Rica	Costa Rica	1–0	1–0	Friendly	
3	20	16 January 2022	Estadio Nacional, Lima, Peru	Peru	1–1	1–1	Friendly	
4	22	17 October 2023	Estadio Rommel Fernández, Panama City, Panama	Guatemala	3–0	3–0	2023 CONCACAF Nations League	

== Honours ==
Santa Gema

- Copa Panamá: 2016–17

CAI

- Liga Panameña de Fútbol: 2019 Clausura

Cusco F.C.

- 2022 Liga 2 (Peru)
