= Football at the 2019 Pan American Games – Men's tournament =

Football – Men's tournament at the 2019 Pan American Games
- Venue: Estadio Universidad San Marcos
- Dates: 29 July – 10 August

Medalists
Gold medal	Argentina
Silver medal	Honduras
Bronze medal	Mexico

The men's football tournament at the 2019 Pan American Games was held in Lima from 29 July to 10 August 2019.

== Qualification ==
A total of eight men's teams qualified to compete at the games, four CONMEBOL teams and four CONCACAF teams. For CONMEBOL, the best three teams at the 2019 South American U-20 Championship qualified, while Peru automatically qualified as hosts. For CONCACAF, the best team from each of the three zones (North American, Central American and Caribbean) at the 2018 CONCACAF U-20 Championship qualified, however, United States (best North American team) declined to participate and were replaced by Mexico. Honduras also qualified by decision of CONCACAF.

=== Qualified teams ===
Confederation	Region	Means of qualification	Teams qualified	Appearance	Previous best performance
CONCACAF	North American	2018 CONCACAF U-20 Championship (1–21 November 2018)	Mexico	15th	Gold medal (1967, 1975, 1999, 2011)
CONCACAF	Caribbean	2018 CONCACAF U-20 Championship (1–21 November 2018)	Jamaica	5th	Silver medal (2007)
CONCACAF	Central American	2018 CONCACAF U-20 Championship (1–21 November 2018)	Panama	2nd	Fourth place (2015)
CONCACAF	Central American	Last berth defined by CONCACAF	Honduras	5th	Silver medal (1999)
CONMEBOL	South American	Automatically qualified	Peru (hosts)	2nd	Group stage (2015)
CONMEBOL	South American	2019 South American U-20 Championship (17 January–10 February 2019)	Argentina	15th	Gold medal (1951, 1955, 1959, 1971, 1995, 2003)
CONMEBOL	South American	2019 South American U-20 Championship (17 January–10 February 2019)	Uruguay	7th	Gold medal (1983, 2015)
CONMEBOL	South American	2019 South American U-20 Championship (17 January–10 February 2019)	Ecuador	4th	Gold medal (2007)

== Draw ==
The draw of the tournament was held on 12 April 2019, 12:00 PET (UTC−5), at the Peruvian Football Federation headquarters in Lima, Peru. The eight teams were drawn into two groups of four and each group was conformed by two CONCACAF teams and two CONMEBOL teams. The hosts Peru were seeded into group B and assigned to position 4 in their group, while the remaining seven teams were placed into two pots according to the confederation which they belong.

CONCACAF pot	CONMEBOL pot
Jamaica; Honduras; Mexico; Panama	Argentina; Ecuador; Uruguay

The CONCACAF teams were drawn first and assigned to positions 1 and 2 in groups A and B. Then, the CONMEBOL teams were drawn and the first two teams occupied positions 3 and 4 in group A while the third team occupied the position 3 in group B. The draw resulted in the following groups:

Group A
Pos	Team
A1	Panama
A2	Mexico
A3	Ecuador
A4	Argentina

Group B
Pos	Team
B1	Jamaica
B2	Honduras
B3	Uruguay
B4	Peru

The draw was led by Hugo Figueredo, competition director of CONMEBOL, and had the help of Miriam Tristan and Cindy Novoa members of the Peru women's national football team

== Squads ==
Players must be born on or after 1 January 1997, three overage players are allowed.

== Match officials ==
The referees and assistant referees were:

- (Argentina) Fernando Echenique
  - Assistants: Cristian Navarro and Lucas Germanotta
- (Brazil) Wagner Magalhaes
  - Assistants: Emerson De Carvalho and Alessandro Rocha
- (Chile) Felipe González
  - Assistants: Raúl Orellana and Edson Cisternas
- (Colombia) Gustavo Murillo
  - Assistants: Miguel Roldán and John Gallego
- (Paraguay) Ulises Mereles
  - Assistants: Juan Zorrilla and Rodney Aquino
- (Peru) Michael Espinoza
  - Assistants: Michael Orué and Stephen Atoche
- (Peru) Miguel Santibañez
  - Assistants: Raúl López and Jesús Sánchez
- (Venezuela) José Argote
  - Assistants: Franchescoly Chacón and Alberto Ponte

== Group stage ==
Tie-breakers

All times are local, PET (UTC−5).

=== Group A ===
Pos	Team	Pld	W	D	L	GF	GA	GD	Pts	Qualification
1	Mexico	3	2	1	0	4	1	+3	7	Knockout stage
2	Argentina	3	2	0	1	7	5	+2	6	Knockout stage
3	Panama	3	0	2	1	2	4	−2	2	Fifth place match
4	Ecuador	3	0	1	2	3	6	−3	1	Seventh place match

Source: Lima 2019
Rules for classification: Tie-breakers
29 July 2019
10:00

Panama	0–0	Mexico
	Report

Estadio Universidad San Marcos, Lima
Referee: José Argote (Venezuela)
29 July 2019
13:00

Ecuador	2–3	Argentina
Rezabala 75'; Naula 89'	Report	Valenzuela 33'; Gaich 40', 76'

Estadio Universidad San Marcos, Lima
Referee: Gustavo Murillo (Colombia)

1 August 2019
10:00

Panama	1–1	Ecuador
Zúñiga 27'	Report	Campana 53'

Estadio Universidad San Marcos, Lima
Referee: Miguel Santibañez (Peru)
1 August 2019
13:00

Mexico	2–1	Argentina
Venegas 13' (pen.); Godínez 81' (pen.)	Report	Gaich 39'

Estadio Universidad San Marcos, Lima
Referee: Michael Espinoza (Peru)

4 August 2019
10:00

Panama	1–3	Argentina
Aguilar 45'	Report	Gaich 4'; Lomonaco 14'; Valenzuela 80'

Estadio Universidad San Marcos, Lima
Referee: Ulises Mereles (Paraguay)
4 August 2019
13:00

Ecuador	0–2	Mexico
	Report	Vásquez 25'; Lainez 90'+5'

Estadio Universidad San Marcos, Lima
Referee: Wagner Magalhães (Brazil)

=== Group B ===
Pos	Team	Pld	W	D	L	GF	GA	GD	Pts	Qualification
1	Uruguay	3	3	0	0	7	0	+7	9	Knockout stage
2	Honduras	3	1	1	1	5	6	−1	4	Knockout stage
3	Jamaica	3	1	0	2	3	5	−2	3	Fifth place match
4	Peru (H)	3	0	1	2	2	6	−4	1	Seventh place match

Source: Lima 2019
Rules for classification: Tie-breakers
(H) Hosts
29 July 2019
17:30

Jamaica	1–3	Honduras
Beckford 46'	Report	Vuelto 71', 80'; Martínez 78'

Estadio Universidad San Marcos, Lima
Referee: Fernando Echenique (Argentina)
29 July 2019
20:30

Uruguay	2–0	Peru
Núñez 6'; Fernández 36'	Report

Estadio Universidad San Marcos, Lima
Referee: Ulises Mereles (Paraguay)

1 August 2019
17:30

Jamaica	0–2	Uruguay
	Report	Fernández 61', 72'

Estadio Universidad San Marcos, Lima
Referee: Wagner Magalhães (Brazil)
1 August 2019
20:30

Honduras	2–2	Peru
Vuelto 90'+2'; Maldonado 90'+7'	Report	Quevedo 15'; Guivin 62'

Estadio Universidad San Marcos, Lima
Referee: Felipe González (Chile)

4 August 2019
17:30

Uruguay	3–0	Honduras
Arriaga 34' (o.g.); Ramírez 75' (pen.); Fernández 84'	Report

Estadio Universidad San Marcos, Lima
Referee: Gustavo Murillo (Colombia)
4 August 2019
20:30

Jamaica	2–0	Peru
Beckford 55', 60'	Report

Estadio Universidad San Marcos, Lima
Referee: Fernando Echenique (Argentina)

== Placement stage (5th–8th place) ==
7th place
7 August – Lima
Ecuador	1 (2)
Peru (p)	1 (4)

5th place
7 August – Lima
Panama	4
Jamaica	0

=== Seventh place match ===
7 August 2019
10:00

Ecuador	1–1	Peru
Vivar 88'	Report	Minda 83' (o.g.)
Penalties
Vallecilla (penalty scored); Alcivar (penalty missed); Porozo (penalty scored); Minda (penalty missed)	2–4	(penalty missed) Barco; (penalty scored) Acuy; (penalty scored) Arakaki; (penalty scored) Pretell; (penalty scored) Rivera

Estadio Universidad San Marcos, Lima
Referee: José Argote (Venezuela)

=== Fifth place match ===
7 August 2019
13:00

Panama	4–0	Jamaica
Aguilar 3'; Carrasquilla 11'; Ayarza 28'; Zúñiga 58'	Report

Estadio Universidad San Marcos, Lima
Referee: Miguel Santibañez (Peru)

== Knockout stage ==
If necessary, extra time and penalty shoot-out are used to decide the winner.

Semi-finals
7 August – Lima
Mexico	1 (2)
Honduras (p)	1 (4)
7 August – Lima
Uruguay	0
Argentina	3

Gold medal match
10 August – Lima
Honduras	1
Argentina	4
Bronze medal match
10 August – Lima
Mexico	1
Uruguay	0

=== Semi-finals ===
7 August 2019
17:30

Mexico	1–1 (a.e.t.)	Honduras
Venegas 40'	Report	Reyes 79'
Penalties
Govea (penalty missed); Vásquez (penalty scored); López (penalty missed); Macías (penalty scored)	2–4	(penalty scored) Martínez; (penalty scored) Vuelto; (penalty scored) Reyes; (penalty scored) Maldonado

Estadio Universidad San Marcos, Lima
Referee: Ulises Mereles (Paraguay)

7 August 2019
20:30

Uruguay	0–3	Argentina
	Report	Gaich 6', 85'; Valenzuela 29'

Estadio Universidad San Marcos, Lima
Referee: Wagner Magalhães (Brazil)

=== Bronze medal match ===
10 August 2019
17:30

Mexico	1–0	Uruguay
Yrizar 7'	Report

Estadio Universidad San Marcos, Lima
Referee: Fernando Echenique (Argentina)

=== Gold medal match ===
10 August 2019
20:30

Honduras	1–4	Argentina
Martínez 42'	Report	Urzi 7'; Valenzuela 58'; Necul 61'; Vera 65'

Estadio Universidad San Marcos, Lima
Referee: Gustavo Murillo (Colombia)

Team details

Honduras
Argentina

GK	18	Alex Güity
DF	2	Denil Maldonado
DF	3	Elvin Oliva
DF	4	Elison Rivas	(yellow card) 32'
DF	16	José García
MF	7	Alejandro Reyes
MF	8	Jorge Álvarez
MF	13	Carlos Pineda
FW	17	Kilmar Peña		(substituted off) 80'
FW	9	Douglas Martínez
FW	11	Darixon Vuelto
Substitutes:
MF		José Pinto		(substituted in) 80'
Manager:
(Uruguay) Fabián Coito

GK	1	Facundo Cambeses
DF	4	Marcelo Herrera
DF	2	Leonel Mosevich
DF	6	Joaquín Novillo
DF	14	Facundo Medina
MF	5	Fausto Vera	(yellow card) 23'	(substituted off) 80'
MF	11	Santiago Colombatto
MF	10	Nicolás González	(yellow card) 18'
FW	7	Carlos Valenzuela
FW	9	Adolfo Gaich
FW	16	Agustín Urzi		(substituted off) 57'
Substitutes:
MF	17	Lucas Necul		(substituted in) 57'
MF	15	Aníbal Moreno		(substituted in) 80'
Manager:
(Argentina) Fernando Batista

2019 Pan American Games
Men's football tournament Winners

Argentina
7th title

== Final standings ==
Rank	Team
1st place, gold medalist(s)	Argentina
2nd place, silver medalist(s)	Honduras
3rd place, bronze medalist(s)	Mexico
4	Uruguay
5	Panama
6	Jamaica
7	Peru
8	Ecuador

== Goalscorers ==
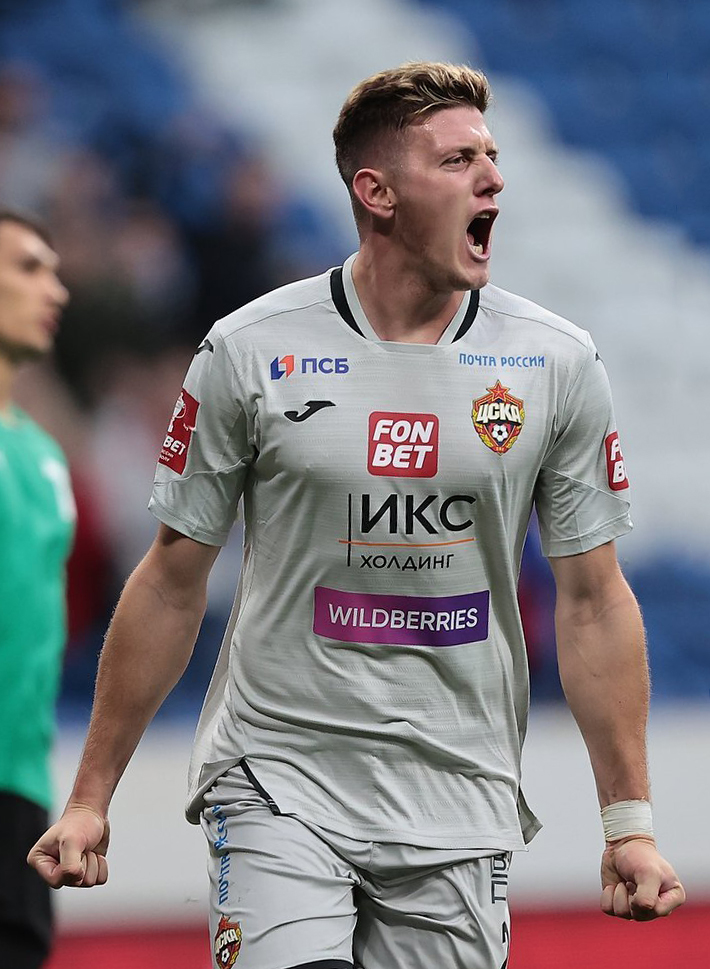
Argentine Adolfo Gaich, top scorer

There were 50 goals scored in 18 matches, for an average of 2.78 goals per match.

6 goals

- (Argentina) Adolfo Gaich

4 goals

- (Argentina) Carlos Valenzuela
- (Uruguay) Leonardo Fernández

3 goals

- (Honduras) Darixon Vuelto
- (Jamaica) Deshane Beckford

2 goals

- (Honduras) Douglas Martínez
- (Mexico) Francisco Venegas
- (Panama) Jorman Aguilar
- (Panama) Luis Zúñiga

1 goal

- (Argentina) Lucas Necul
- (Argentina) Agustín Urzi
- (Argentina) Fausto Vera
- (Argentina) Sebastián Lomonaco
- (Ecuador) Leonardo Campana
- (Ecuador) Anderson Naula
- (Ecuador) Jordan Rezabala
- (Ecuador) Janus Vivar
- (Honduras) Denil Maldonado
- (Honduras) José Reyes
- (Mexico) José de Jesús Godínez
- (Mexico) Mauro Lainez
- (Mexico) Johan Vásquez
- (Mexico) Paolo Yrizay
- (Panama) Abdiel Ayarza
- (Panama) Adalberto Carrasquilla
- (Peru) Jordan Guivin
- (Peru) Kevin Quevedo
- (Uruguay) Darwin Núñez
- (Uruguay) Ignacio Ramírez

1 own goal

- (Ecuador) Kevin Minda (against Peru)
- (Honduras) Kervin Arriaga (against Uruguay)

Source: Lima 2019
