= Jaime Lozano =

Mexican footballer and manager

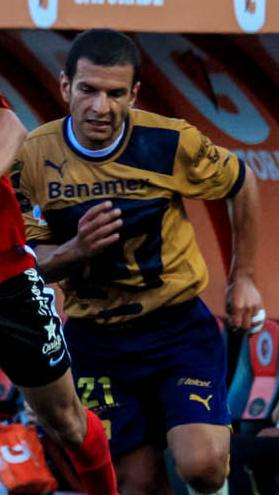
- Lozano with Pumas in 2012

Personal information
- Full name: Jaime Arturo Lozano Espín
- Date of birth: 29 September 1979 (age 47)
- Place of birth: Mexico City, Mexico
- Height: 1.71 m (5 ft 7 in)
- Position: Midfielder

Senior career*
Years	Team	Apps	(Gls)
1998–2005	Pumas	152	(25)
2001–2002	→ Celaya (loan)	24	(1)
2005–2007	Tigres UANL	67	(12)
2007–2012	Cruz Azul	90	(15)
2010–2012	→ Morelia (loan)	69	(12)
2012–2013	Pumas	10	(0)
Total		412	(65)

International career
2000–2007	Mexico	34	(12)

Managerial career
- 2014: Pumas (academy)
- 2015–2016: Querétaro (academy)
- 2016–2017: Querétaro (assistant)
- 2017: Querétaro
- 2018–2021: Mexico U23
- 2022: Necaxa
- 2023–2024: Mexico
- 2025: Pachuca
Medal record
Men's football
Representing Mexico (as a player)
CONCACAF Gold Cup
Runner-up	2007 United States	Team
Copa América
Third place	2007 Venezuela	Team
Representing Mexico (as manager)
CONCACAF Gold Cup
Winner	2023 United States–Canada	Team
CONCACAF Nations League
Runner-up	2024 United States	Team
Pan American Games
Bronze medal – third place	2019 Lima	Team
Olympic Games
Bronze medal – third place	2020 Tokyo	Team
- * Club domestic league appearances and goals

Jaime Arturo "Jimmy" Lozano Espín (born 29 September 1979) is a Mexican professional football manager and former player.

Lozano spent the majority of his playing career with Universidad Nacional, where he made over 160 appearances, and won two Primera División titles.

At international level, Lozano made 34 appearances for the Mexico national team. He represented his country in various competitions, including the 2004 and 2007 Copa America tournaments, the 2005 FIFA Confederations Cup and the 2007 CONCACAF Gold Cup.

== Club career ==
Lozano made his professional debut with Universidad Nacional in 1998. After a brief stint with Celaya, he went back to his former club, where, under the leadership of Hugo Sánchez, he won two consecutive league titles in 2004.

In the years that followed, Lozano played for Tigres UANL, Cruz Azul and Morelia, before making his return to Universidad Nacional, where he concluded a 15-year career.

== International career ==
Lozano was capped 34 times for the Mexico national team; he made three appearances in the team's fourth-place finish at the 2005 FIFA Confederations Cup, and eleven in the 2006 FIFA World Cup qualifiers. A series of injuries kept him away from the team in the months leading up to the World Cup. Nevertheless, Lozano was named by Ricardo La Volpe in a provisional list of 26 players. However, he did not make the final list.

Lozano was one of the players selected by Hugo Sánchez to compete in the Copa América 2007. He made his first appearance in the tournament coming on as a substitute in Mexico's opening 2–0 group stage victory over Brazil.

== Managerial career ==
=== Querétaro ===
After winning the U-20 Clausura Liga MX title with Querétaro FC's U-20 team, Lozano was promoted to be an assistant coach at Querétaro's senior team under Víctor Manuel Vucetich.

After Vucetich was sacked on 31 January 2017, Lozano was appointed manager. On 16 July, he won his first career title as a manager when Querétaro defeated América 2–0 to clinch the 2017 Supercopa MX. On 22 October, Lozano was sacked after a poor run of form which left Querétaro in last place, being replaced by Luis Fernando Tena.

=== Mexico U23 ===
On 18 December 2018, Lozano was named manager of the Mexico U-23 national team.

At the 2019 Toulon Tournament, Lozano took the team to a third-place finish, defeating the Republic of Ireland in a penalty shoot-out 4–3 following a scoreless draw. Disputing the Pan American Games the following month, he led the team to a third-place finish, defeating Uruguay 1–0, receiving the bronze medal. At the 2020 Summer Olympics, Lozano took the U-23 team to a third-place finish, defeating hosts Japan 3–1 in the bronze medal match.

=== Necaxa ===
On 9 February 2022, Lozano was appointed as manager of Liga MX side Necaxa. He led the team to the Reclassification phase of the Clausura 2022, where they tied 1–1 on aggregate but lost 3–1 in a penalty shoot-out to Cruz Azul. After Necaxa failed to get past the Reclassification phase in the Apertura 2022 following a 2–0 defeat to Tigres UANL, Necaxa and Lozano mutually parted ways.

=== Mexico national team ===
After Mexico's 3–0 loss to the United States in the 2023 CONCACAF Nations League semi-finals and the subsequent firing of Diego Cocca, Lozano was appointed as interim manager to lead the side for the forthcoming Gold Cup. Mexico went on to win the tournament, defeating Panama 1–0 in the final. On 10 August, the Mexican Football Federation announced that Lozano would stay on as manager of the national team. On 16 July 2024, Lozano was dismissed from his position following an underwhelming group stage exit from the 2024 Copa América.

=== Pachuca ===
On 29 May 2025, Pachuca announced Lozano as their new head coach. The following month, Pachuca participated in the FIFA Club World Cup and had a group-stage exit. On 10 November, Lozano was relieved of his duties.

== Personal life ==
Lozano's parents were both telenovela actors, and was given the nickname "El Actor" during his playing career. His mother is actress Ana Bertha Espín and his father is actor of the same name Jaime Lozano.

During the peak of his career, Lozano was featured on the North American cover of EA Sports' 2006 FIFA World Cup video game alongside Claudio Reyna. He did not make Mexico's final roster that participated at the World Cup.

== Career statistics ==
=== International ===
Appearances and goals by national team and year
National team	Year	Apps	Goals
Mexico	2000	2	0
Mexico	2003	1	0
Mexico	2004	8	8
Mexico	2005	12	3
Mexico	2006	2	0
Mexico	2007	7	1
Mexico	2008	1	0
Total		33	12

Scores and results list Mexico's goal tally first, score column indicates score after each Lozano goal.

List of international goals scored by Jaime Lozano
No.	Date	Venue	Opponent	Score	Result	Competition	Ref.
1	19 June 2004	Alamodome, San Antonio, United States	Dominica	7–0	10–0	2006 FIFA World Cup qualification	
2	19 June 2004	Alamodome, San Antonio, United States	Dominica	9–0	10–0	2006 FIFA World Cup qualification	
3	27 June 2004	Estadio Victoria, Aguascalientes, Mexico	Dominica	2–0	8–0	2006 FIFA World Cup qualification	
4	27 June 2004	Estadio Victoria, Aguascalientes, Mexico	Dominica	7–0	8–0	2006 FIFA World Cup qualification	
5	6 October 2004	Estadio Hidalgo, Pachuca, Mexico	Saint Vincent and the Grenadines	2–0	7–0	2006 FIFA World Cup qualification	
6	6 October 2004	Estadio Hidalgo, Pachuca, Mexico	Saint Vincent and the Grenadines	3–0	7–0	2006 FIFA World Cup qualification	
7	13 October 2004	Estadio Cuauhtémoc, Puebla, Mexico	Trinidad and Tobago	2–0	3–0	2006 FIFA World Cup qualification	
8	13 October 2004	Estadio Cuauhtémoc, Puebla, Mexico	Trinidad and Tobago	3–0	3–0	2006 FIFA World Cup qualification	
9	9 February 2005	Estadio Ricardo Saprissa Aymá, San Juan, Costa Rica	Costa Rica	1–0	2–1	2006 FIFA World Cup qualification	
10	9 February 2005	Estadio Ricardo Saprissa Aymá, San Juan, Costa Rica	Costa Rica	2–0	2–1	2006 FIFA World Cup qualification	
11	12 October 2005	Hasely Crawford Stadium, Port of Spain, Trinidad and Tobago	Trinidad and Tobago	1–0	1–2	2006 FIFA World Cup qualification	
12	2 June 2007	Estadio Alfonso Lastras, San Luis, Mexico	Iran	2–0	4–0	Friendly	

== Managerial statistics ==
As of 9 November 2025

Team	From	To	Record				
Team	From	To	G	W	D	L	Win %
Querétaro	1 February 2017	22 October 2017	36	11	9	16	30.56
Mexico U23	18 December 2018	6 August 2021	24	16	6	2	66.67
Necaxa	9 February 2022	10 October 2022	31	11	7	13	35.48
Mexico	19 June 2023	16 July 2024	21	10	4	7	47.62
Pachuca	29 May 2025	10 November 2025	24	8	5	11	33.33
Total			136	56	31	49	41.18

== Honours ==
=== Player ===
Pumas

- Mexican Primera División: Clausura 2004, Apertura 2004
- Campeón de Campeones: 2004

Morelia

- North American SuperLiga: 2010

Individual

- Mexican Primera División Best Full-back: 2003–04
- Mexican Primera División Best Attacking Midfielder: Apertura 2009

=== Manager ===
Querétaro

- Supercopa MX: 2017

Mexico U23

- Pan American Bronze Medal: 2019
- CONCACAF Olympic Qualifying Championship: 2020
- Olympic Bronze Medal: 2020

Mexico

- CONCACAF Gold Cup: 2023

Individual

- Liga MX Manager of the Month: July 2025
