= Brazil at the 1963 Pan American Games =

- IOC code: BRA
- NOC: Brazilian Olympic Committee
- Website: www.cob.org.br

in São Paulo April 20 – May 5, 1963
- Competitors: 385 in 19 sports
- Flag bearer: Roberto Chap Chap
- Medals Ranked 2nd: Gold 14 Silver 21 Bronze 18 Total 53

Pan American Games appearances (overview)
- 1951; 1955; 1959; 1963; 1967; 1971; 1975; 1979; 1983; 1987; 1991; 1995; 1999; 2003; 2007; 2011; 2015; 2019; 2023

Brazil was the host nation of the 4th Pan American Games held in São Paulo, from April 20 to May 5, 1963. Brazil finished second in the final ranking, a performance only matched again at the 2019 Pan American Games in Lima.

== Medals ==
Medal	Name(s)	Sport	Event	Date	Ref
Bronze	Iris dos Santos	Athletics	Women's javelin throw	27 April 1963	
Silver	Iris dos Santos	Athletics	Women's long jump	27 April 1963	
Silver	Sebastião Mendes	Athletics	Men's 3000m steeplechase	30 April 1963	
Bronze	Roberto Chapchap	Athletics	Men's hammer throw	3 May 1963	
Silver	Men's basketball team: Amaury Pasos Antônio Salvador Sucar Carlos Domingo Massoni Carmo de Souza Celso Luiz Scarpini Edson Bispo Friedrich Wilhem Braun Luiz Cláudio Menon Ubiratan Pereira Maciel Victor Mirshauswka Wlamir Marques Waldemar Blatskauskas	Basketball	Men's tournament	3 May 1963	
Bronze	Mario Gomes	Athletics	Men's triple jump	4 May 1963	
Bronze	Walter de Almeida	Athletics	Men's javelin throw	4 May 1963	
Bronze	Wanda dos Santos	Athletics	Women's 80m hurdles	4 May 1963	
Bronze	Edir Ribeiro; Érica da Silva; Inês Pimenta; Leontina Santos	Athletics	Women's 4 × 100 m relay	4 May 1963	
Gold	Men's football team: Adevaldo Aírton Arlindo Carlos Alberto Nene Décio Dirceu Evaldo Heitor Perroca Hélio Dias Íris Jairzinho Cardoso Zé Carlos Luiz Henrique Menotti Othon Riva Zanin Valdir	Football	Men's tournament	4 May 1963	
Bronze	Leny Filelini; Maria Helena Nascimento; Fiametta Palazo; Cecilia Ghezzi; Ana Maria Oliveira; Ignez Barros Porto; Eliana Chaves Uruguai; Ana Luisa Corrêa	Synchronized swimming	Team	5 May 1963	
Silver	Women's basketball team: Angelina Bizarro Delcy Ellender Marques Diva Lucia Marchetti Isaura Marli Alvares Maria Amélia Gomes Maria Helena Campos Maria Helena Cardoso Marlene José Bento Nadir Bazani Neuci Ramos da Silva Norma Pinto de Oliveira Nilza Monte Garcia	Basketball	Women's tournament		
Silver	Pedro Dias	Boxing	Men's flyweight (-51 kg)		
Gold	Rosemiro Mateus	Boxing	Men's featherweight (-57 kg)		
Silver	João da Silva	Boxing	Men's lightweight (-60 kg)		
Silver	Orlando Nunes	Boxing	Men's light welterweight (-63,5 kg)		
Silver	Rubens Alves Vasconcelos	Boxing	Men's welterweight (-67 kg)		
Gold	Elcio Neves	Boxing	Men's light middleweight (-71 kg)		
Gold	Luiz Cézar	Boxing	Men's middleweight (-75 kg)		
Bronze	Rubens Oliveira	Boxing	Men's light heavyweight (-81 kg)		
Silver	José Edson Jorge	Boxing	Men's heavyweight (+81 kg)		
Bronze	Anésio Argenton	Cycling	Men's 1000m time trial (track)		
Silver	Aloysio Alves Borges; Arthur Cramer; Carlos Luiz Couto; José Maria Pereira	Fencing	Men's épée team		
Silver	Jorge Yamashita	Judo	Men's lightweight (-70 kg)		(Note: This medal is missing in some counts.)
Gold	Lhofei Shiozawa	Judo	Men's middleweight (-80 kg)		
Silver	Milton Lovato	Judo	Men's heavyweight (-93 kg)		
Silver	Georges Mehdi	Judo	Men's open class		
Silver	José Wilson Pereira; Justo Botelho Santiago; Nilo Jaime da Silva	Modern pentathlon	Men's team		
Silver	Ivan Pital	Rowing	Men's single sculls		
Bronze	Edgard Gijsen; Francisco Todesco	Rowing	Men's double sculls		
Bronze	Adriano Monteiro Soares; Antemídio Julião; Audifax Barbosa	Rowing	Men's coxed pair-oared shells		
Silver	Alberto Blemer; Antemídio Julião; Assis Garcia Ramos; Audifax Barbosa; Sylvio de Souza	Rowing	Men's coxed four-oared shells		
Silver	Fritz Müller; Harri Klein; Jorge Rodrigues; Roberto Knirien	Rowing	Men's coxless four-oared shells		
Silver	Ado Steiner; Edson Schmidt; Erich Passig; Ernestro Vahl Filho; Jobel Furtado; Manuel Silveira; Rui Souza Lopes; Teodoro Rogério Vahl; Walfredo Santos	Rowing	Men's eight-oared shells		
Gold	Hans Helmuth Domscke	Sailing	Finn class		
Bronze	Harry Adler; Luiz Peixoto Ramos	Sailing	Star class		
Silver	Axel Schmidt; Erik Oluf Schmidt; Robinson Hasselmann	Sailing	Lightning class		
Gold	Joaquim Roderbourg; Klaus Hendriksen	Sailing	Flying Dutchman		
Gold	Ralph Conrad; Reinaldo Conrad	Sailing	Snipe class		
Bronze	Álvaro dos Santos Filho; Benevenuto Tilli; Durval Guimarães; Francisco Estrella	Shooting	Men's 50m pistol team		
Bronze	Álvaro Altmann; Amílcar Caldeira; Edmar de Salles; Milton Sobocinski	Shooting	Men's 50m high power rifle three positions team		
Bronze	Athos de Oliveira	Swimming	Men's 100m backstroke		
Bronze	Athos de Oliveira; Antonio Renzo Filho; Antonio Celso Guimarães; Peter Wolfgang Metzner	Swimming	Men's 4 × 200 m freestyle relay		
Bronze	Eliana Souza Motta; Maria Lourdes Teixeira; Angela Maria Palioli; Vera Maria Formiga	Swimming	Women's 4 × 100 m freestyle relay		
Gold	Ronald Barnes	Tennis	Men's singles		
Gold	Carlos Fernandes; Ronald Barnes	Tennis	Men's doubles		
Bronze	Iarte Adam; Thomaz Koch	Tennis	Men's doubles		
Gold	Maria Esther Bueno	Tennis	Women's singles		
Silver	Maria Esther Bueno; Maureen Schwartz	Tennis	Women's doubles		
Silver	Maria Esther Bueno; Thomaz Koch	Tennis	Mixed doubles		
Gold	Men's volleyball team: Carlos Albano Feitosa Décio de Azevedo Fábio Starling Carvalho Giuseppe Mezzalma João Cláudio França Josias Ramalho Luiz Roberto Moraes Marco Antônio Volpi Emanuel Newdon Pedro Barbosa de Andrade Roque Midley Maron Victor Barcellos Borges	Volleyball	Men's tournament		
Gold	Women's volleyball team: Corina Lasperg Elda Pimenta Eunice Rondino Joana Silva Leila Peixoto Lia de Freitas Marina Conceição Calistre Marlene Dunishian Norma Rosa Vaz Tânia Fagundes Vera Trezoitko Zilda Ulbrich	Volleyball	Women's tournament		
Gold	Men's water polo team: Adhemar Grijó Filho Aladar Szabo Flávio Ratto Ivo Carotini João Gonçalves Filho Luís Carlos Valim Luiz Daniel Luiz Eduardo Lima Márvio dos Santos Paulo Carotini	Water polo	Men's tournament		

Medals by sport
Sport	1st place, gold medalist(s)	2nd place, silver medalist(s)	3rd place, bronze medalist(s)	Total
Boxing	3	5	1	9
Tennis	3	2	1	6
Sailing	3	1	1	5
Volleyball	2	0	0	2
Judo	1	3	0	4
Football	1	0	0	1
Waterpolo	1	0	0	1
Rowing	0	4	2	6
Athletics	0	2	6	8
Basketball	0	2	0	2
Fencing	0	1	0	1
Modern Pentathlon	0	1	0	1
Swimming	0	0	3	3
Shooting	0	0	2	2
Cycling	0	0	1	1
Synchronized swimming	0	0	1	1
Total	14	21	18	53

== See also ==
- Brazil at the 1964 Summer Olympics
- List of Pan American medalists for Brazil
