= List of Brazil international footballers (1 cap) =

The Brazil national football team represents the country of Brazil in international association football. It is fielded by the Brazilian Football Confederation (CBF), the governing body of football in Brazil, and competes as a member of CONMEBOL, which encompasses the countries of South America.

== Key ==
Positions key
GK	Goalkeeper
DF	Defender
MF	Midfielder
FW	Forward

Player
This colour background and the * symbol indicate that the player is currently active at the club level.
Position
Playing positions are listed according to the player's primary position while playing for the national team.
Caps and goals
Caps and goals comprise all those in official "A" international matches as recognised by the CBF. This includes competitive matches (FIFA World Cup qualifying and final tournaments, FIFA Confederations Cup, CONCACAF Gold Cup, etc.) and international friendly matches.

== Players ==
Brazil national football team players with 1 cap
Player	Position	Goals	Appearance		Pos. ref.
Player	Position	Goals	Date	Opponent	Pos. ref.
Octavio Egydio; Octavio Egydio de Oliveira Carvalho	MF	0	20 September 1914	Argentina	
Rubens Salles; Rubens de Moraes Salles	MF	1	27 September 1914	Argentina	
Demóstenes; Demósthenes Corrêa de Syllos	FW	1	8 July 1916	Chile	
Carlito; Manoel Carlos Aranha	DF	0	18 July 1916	Uruguay	
Giacomo Facchini; Giacomo Facchine	MF	0	18 July 1916	Uruguay	
Osny; Osny Augusto Werner	DF	0	18 July 1916	Uruguay	
Adhemar; Adhemar dos Santos	MF	0	3 October 1917	Argentina	
Paula Ramos; José França de Paula Ramos	MF	0	7 October 1917	Uruguay	
Arlindo Pacheco; Arlindo Correia Pacheco	FW	2	1 June 1919	Argentina	
Oscar Carregal; Oscar Cyrillo Carregal	FW	0	1 June 1919	Argentina	
Dionysio; Dionysio Álvaro dos Santos	GK	0	1 June 1919	Argentina	
Rodrigo; Rodrigo Antônio Brandão	MF	0	11 September 1920	Chile	
Nonô; Claudionor Gonçalves da Silva	FW	0	2 October 1921	Argentina	
Francisco Abatte; Francisco Abatte	MF	0	22 October 1922	Argentina	
Francisco Chaves; Francisco Chaves de Almeida	FW	1	22 October 1922	Argentina	
José Faragassi; José Faragassi	MF	0	22 October 1922	Argentina	
Leite de Castro; Joaquim Antônio Leite de Castro	FW	0	22 October 1922	Argentina	
Fidêncio Osses; Fidêncio Osses	FW	0	22 October 1922	Argentina	
Luiz Tepet; Luiz Tepet	FW	0	22 October 1922	Argentina	
Alexy; Alexy Nuyers	DF	0	29 October 1922	Paraguay	
Imparatinho; Caetano Imparatto	FW	2	29 October 1922	Paraguay	
Gino Martinelli; Gino Martinelli	FW	0	29 October 1922	Paraguay	
Xingó; Pedro Salvador	MF	0	29 October 1922	Paraguay	
Torteroli; Nicomedes da Conceição	FW	0	11 November 1923	Paraguay	
Batalha; José Lodi Batalha	GK	0	17 December 1925	Paraguay	
José Rueda; José Rueda	DF	0	25 December 1925	Argentina	
Araken Patusca; Araken Abraham Patusca da Silveira	FW	0	14 July 1930	Yugoslavia	
Brilhante; Alfredo Brilhante da Costa	DF	0	14 July 1930	Yugoslavia	
Poly; Polycarpo Ribeiro de Oliveira	FW	0	14 July 1930	Yugoslavia	
Henrique Serafini; Henrique Serafini	MF	0	1 August 1930	France	
Armando Del Debbio; Armando Del Debbio	DF	0	1 August 1930	France	
Pedro Sernagiotto; Pedro Sernagiotto	MF	0	1 August 1930	France	
Pedro Rizzeti; Pedro Rizzetto	MF	0	1 August 1930	France	
Santana; Sebastião Santana	FW	0	10 August 1930	Yugoslavia	
Doca; Alfredo de Almeida Rego	FW	1	17 August 1930	United States	
Newton Barbosa; Newton Ribeiro Barbosa	MF	0	17 August 1930	United States	
Oscarino; Oscarino Costa da Silva	DF	0	17 August 1930	United States	
Luís Matoso; Luiz Fernandes de Macedo Matoso	FW	0	6 September 1931	Uruguay	
Goliardo Gelardi; Giuseppe Gogliardo Gelardi	MF	0	6 September 1931	Uruguay	
Hildegardo; Hildegardo de Almeida Magalhães	DF	0	6 September 1931	Uruguay	
Alfredo; Alfredo Pires de Andrade	MF	0	6 September 1931	Uruguay	
Agrícola; Agrícola de Siqueira	MF	0	4 December 1932	Uruguay	
Gradim; Francisco de Souza Ferreira	FW	0	4 December 1932	Uruguay	
Ivan Mariz; Ivan Mariz	MF	0	4 December 1932	Uruguay	
Jarbas Batista; Jarbas Baptista	FW	0	4 December 1932	Uruguay	
Paulinho; Paulo Goulart de Oliveira	FW	0	4 December 1932	Uruguay	
Victor; Victor Correia Gonçalves	GK	0	4 December 1932	Uruguay	
Tinoco; Alfredo Alves Tinoco	MF	0	27 May 1934	Spain	
Ariel Nogueira; Ariel Augusto Nogueira	MF	0	3 June 1934	Yugoslavia	
Bioró; Arthur Evaristo	DF	0	15 January 1939	Argentina	
Mamede da Guia; Mamede Antônio da Guia	MF	0	15 January 1939	Argentina	
Thadeu Bogurawski Filho; Thadeu Bogurrawski Filho	GK	0	22 January 1939	Argentina	
Junqueira; José Junqueira de Oliveira	DF	0	18 February 1940	Argentina	
Hortêncio de Souza; Hortêncio de Souza	FW	0	24 March 1940	Uruguay	
Carlos Brant; Carlos Brant	DF	0	31 March 1940	Uruguay	
Russo; Adolpho Milman Júnior	FW	0	21 January 1942	Peru	
Joanino; Joanino Bevilácqua	FW	0	31 January 1942	Ecuador	
Piolim; Laurindo Furlani	DF	0	14 May 1944	Uruguay	
Ávila; Oswaldo Ávila	MF	0	18 May 1944	Uruguay	
Vevé; Everaldo Paes de Lima	FW	0	21 January 1945	Colombia	
Djalma; Djalma Bezerra dos Santos	MF	0	28 February 1945	Chile	
Haroldo; Haroldo Batista Pereira	DF	0	1 April 1947	Uruguay	
Carlyle Guimarães; Carlyle Guimarães Cardoso	FW	1	11 April 1948	Uruguay	
Araty; Araty Pedro Vianna	DF	0	6 April 1952	Mexico	
Rubens; Rubens Josué da Costa	MF	0	13 April 1952	Panama	
Ivan Bahiense; Ivan Monteiro Bahiense	MF	0	18 September 1955	Chile	
Hélvio; Hélvio Peçanha Moreira	DF	0	20 September 1955	Chile	
Turcão; Alberto Chuairi	DF	0	20 September 1955	Chile	
Edmur Ribeiro; Edmur Pinto Ribeiro	FW	0	17 November 1955	Paraguay	
Julião; Antônio Elias Julião	MF	0	24 January 1956	Chile	
Ernâni; Ernâni Ribeiro Guimarães	GK	0	11 June 1957	Portugal	
Paulo Martorano; Paulo Martorano	GK	0	16 June 1957	Portugal	
Urubatão; Urubatão Calvo Nunes	MF	0	7 July 1957	Argentina	
Boquinha; João D'Almeida	MF	0	15 September 1957	Chile	
Ceninho; Avatênio Antônio da Costa	FW	0	15 September 1957	Chile	
Wálder dos Santos; Walder dos Santos	DF	0	15 September 1957	Chile	
Albertino; Gilberto Trindade Filho	GK	0	18 September 1957	Chile	
Hamilton; Hamílton Evangelista dos Santos	MF	0	18 September 1957	Chile	
Jota Alves; Antônio José Alves	DF	0	18 September 1957	Chile	
Elcy; Elcy Duarte de Freitas	FW	0	12 December 1959	Uruguay	
Geroldo; Geroldo Guimarães Ramos	DF	0	22 December 1959	Argentina	
Servílio; José Lucas	DF	0	27 December 1959	Ecuador	
Bruno Camozzatto; Bruno Camozzato	DF	0	17 March 1960	Costa Rica	
Kim; Alci Martha de Freitas	MF	0	20 March 1960	Argentina	
Amaro; Amaro José dos Santos	MF	0	30 April 1961	Paraguay	
Ari Clemente; Ary Paulino Clemente da Silva	DF	0	29 June 1961	Paraguay	
Babá; Mário Braga Gadelha	MF	0	29 June 1961	Paraguay	
Agostinho Zeola; Agostinho Zeola	FW	0	29 June 1961	Paraguay	
Benê; Benedito Leopoldo da Silva	FW	0	24 April 1962	Paraguay	
Jair da Costa; Jair da Costa	MF	0	16 May 1962	Wales	
Joaquinzinho; Joaquim Gilberto da Silva	MF	0	3 March 1963	Paraguay	
Altamiro Pereira; Altamiro Pereira	FW	0	10 March 1963	Peru	
Mário Tito; Mário Tito	DF	0	24 March 1963	Argentina	
Dary; Dari Batista	DF	0	13 April 1963	Argentina	
Aírton Beleza; Aírton Baptista dos Santos	FW	0	7 June 1964	Portugal	
Carlinhos; Luiz Carlos Nunes da Silva	MF	0	7 June 1964	Portugal	
Dário Alegria; Jurandir Dário Gouveia Damasceno dos Santos	MF	0	7 September 1965	Uruguay	
Ferrari; Gilberto José Ferrari	DF	0	7 September 1965	Uruguay	
Tupãzinho; José Hernani da Rosa	MF	1	7 September 1965	Uruguay	
Abel Verônico; Abel Verônico da Silva Filho	MF	1	21 November 1965	Hungary	
Edílson; Edílson Rodrigues Vieira	DF	0	21 November 1965	Hungary	
Nair; Nair José da Silva	MF	1	21 November 1965	Hungary	
Prado; Antônio Francisco Bueno do Prado	MF	0	21 November 1965	Hungary	
Fefeu; Alfredo de Souza	MF	0	15 May 1966	Chile	
Édson Cegonha; Édson de Sousa Barbosa	DF	0	18 May 1966	Wales	
Fábio; Fábio Arlindo Medeiros	GK	0	18 May 1966	Wales	
Ivair; Ivair Ferreira	MF	0	18 May 1966	Wales	
Ubirajara Motta; Ubirajara Gonçalves Motta	GK	0	8 June 1966	Peru	
Mário Tilico; Amaro Gomes da Costa	FW	0	19 September 1967	Chile	
Zé Carlos; José Carlos Gaspar Ferreira	DF	0	19 September 1967	Chile	
Neves; Walter Oliveira Neves	DF	0	25 July 1968	Paraguay	
Toninho Guerreiro; Antônio Ferreira	FW	1	25 July 1968	Paraguay	
Copeu; Carlos Cidreira	MF	0	28 July 1968	Paraguay	
Tales; Tales Flamínio Carlos	MF	0	28 July 1968	Paraguay	
Valtencir; Waltencir Pereira Senra	DF	1	7 August 1968	Argentina	
Dirceu Alves; Dirceu Alves Ferreira	MF	0	11 August 1968	Argentina	
Evaldo; Evaldo Cruz	FW	1	11 August 1968	Argentina	
Pedro Paulo; Pedro Paulo Teles Marcelino	DF	0	11 August 1968	Argentina	
Rodrigues; José Rodrigues dos Santos	FW	1	11 August 1968	Argentina	
Babá; Roberto Caveanha	FW	1	17 December 1968	Yugoslavia	
Luiz Carlos Tatu; Luís Carlos Silva Lemos	FW	0	17 December 1968	Yugoslavia	
Scala; Luiz Carlos Scala Loureiro	DF	0	17 December 1968	Yugoslavia	
Caldeira; Leonardo Augusto Caldeira	MF	0	19 December 1968	Yugoslavia	
Décio; Décio Randazo Teixeira	DF	0	19 December 1968	Yugoslavia	
Grapete; José Borges do Couto	DF	0	19 December 1968	Yugoslavia	
Lola; Raimundo José Correia	MF	0	19 December 1968	Yugoslavia	
Mussula; Luiz de Matos Luchesi	GK	0	19 December 1968	Yugoslavia	
Normandes; Onormandes Sousa Lima	DF	0	19 December 1968	Yugoslavia	
Ronaldo Drummond; Ronaldo Gonçalves Drumond	MF	1	19 December 1968	Yugoslavia	
Tião; Sebastião Rocha	MF	0	19 December 1968	Yugoslavia	
Vander; Wander Martins	DF	0	19 December 1968	Yugoslavia	
Lula; Luiz dos Santos Costa	GK	0	24 August 1969	Venezuela	
Baldocchi; José Guilherme Baldochi	DF	0	4 March 1970	Argentina	
Luís Carlos Galter; Luiz Carlos Gálter	DF	0	24 July 1971	Paraguay	
Moisés; Moisés Mathias de Andrade	DF	0	21 June 1973	Soviet Union	
Jairo do Nascimento; Jairo do Nascimento	GK	0	28 April 1976	Uruguay	
Jayme de Almeida; Jayme de Almeida Filho	DF	0	19 May 1976	Argentina	
Nei; Elias Ferreira Sobrinho	MF	0	1 December 1976	Soviet Union	
Nílson Dias; Nílson Severino Dias	FW	0	23 January 1977	Bulgaria	
Zé Mario; José Mário Donizeti Barone	MF	0	8 June 1977	England	
Abel Braga; Abel Carlos da Silva Braga	DF	0	19 April 1978	England	
Guina; Aguinaldo Roberto Gallon Ota	MF	0	31 May 1979	Uruguay	
Jair; Jair Gonçalves Prates	MF	0	24 October 1979	Paraguay	
Robertinho; Roberto Oliveira Gonçalves do Carmo	FW	0	25 September 1980	Paraguay	
Paulo César; Paulo César Camassutti	MF	0	14 March 1981	Chile	
Roberto Cearense; Roberto Almeida Nascimento	FW	0	26 August 1981	Chile	
Rocha; Jorge Luiz Rocha de Paula	MF	0	28 October 1981	Bulgaria	
Adílio; Adílio de Oliveira Gonçalves	MF	0	21 March 1982	West Germany	
Marinho; Mário Caetano Filho	DF	0	28 April 1983	Chile	
Geraldo Touro; Geraldo Pereira	FW	0	24 August 1983	Argentina	
Roberto Costa; Roberto Costa Cabral	GK	0	10 June 1984	England	
Arturzinho; Artur dos Santos Lima	MF	1	21 June 1984	Uruguay	
Jorge Baidek; Jorge Baidek	DF	0	21 June 1984	Uruguay	
Delei; Wanderley Alves de Oliveira	MF	0	21 June 1984	Uruguay	
João Marcos; João Marcos Coelho da Silva	GK	0	21 June 1984	Uruguay	
Betinho; Gilberto Carlos Nascimento	MF	0	12 October 1988	Belgium	
Toninho; Antônio Benedito da Silva	MF	0	15 March 1989	Ecuador	
Jorginho; Jorge Luís da Silva	MF	0	12 September 1990	Spain	
Paulo Egídio; Paulo Egídio Bertollazzi	FW	0	12 September 1990	Spain	
Velloso; Wagner Fernando Velloso	GK	0	12 September 1990	Spain	
João Santos; João dos Santos Ferreira	MF	0	12 December 1990	Mexico	
Marquinhos; Marco Antônio da Silva	MF	0	12 December 1990	Mexico	
Cuca; Alexi Stival	FW	0	27 February 1991	Paraguay	
Maurício; Maurício de Oliveira Anastácio	MF	0	27 February 1991	Paraguay	
Balu; Luís Carlos Carvalho dos Reis	DF	0	17 April 1991	Romania	
Cássio Barros; Cássio Alves de Barros	DF	0	11 September 1991	Wales	
Giba; Antônio Gilberto de Souza Maniaes	DF	0	18 December 1991	Czechoslovakia	
Alexandre Torres; Carlos Alexandre Torres	DF	0	26 February 1992	United States	
Wilson Mano; Wilson Carlos Mano	MF	0	26 February 1992	United States	
Carlos Alberto Dias; Carlos Alberto Costa Dias	MF	0	15 April 1992	Finland	
Axel; Axel Rodrigues de Arruda	MF	0	23 September 1992	Costa Rica	
Marquinhos; Marcos Corrêa dos Santos	MF	0	27 June 1993	Argentina	
Ronaldo Giovanelli; Ronaldo Soares Giovanelli	GK	0	17 November 1993	Germany	
Válber; Válber da Silva Costa	MF	0	17 November 1993	Germany	
Alberto Félix; Alberto Carlos Félix da Silva	MF	0	16 December 1993	Mexico	
Dinho; Edi Wilson José dos Santos	MF	0	16 December 1993	Mexico	
Yan Razera; Yan Cleiton de Lima Razera	MF	0	22 February 1995	Slovakia	
Argel Fuchs; Argélico Fucks	DF	0	29 March 1995	Honduras	
Gélson Baresi; Gélson Tardivo Gonçalves Júnior	DF	0	29 March 1995	Honduras	
Jefferson; Jéfferson Vieira da Silva	DF	0	29 March 1995	Honduras	
Adriano Teixeira; Adriano Félix Teixeira	DF	0	27 September 1995	Romania	
Ronaldo Guiaro; Ronaldo Guiaro	DF	0	26 June 1996	Poland	
Renaldo; Renaldo Lopes da Cruz	FW	0	13 November 1996	Cameroon	
Zé Carlos; José Carlos de Almeida	DF	0	7 July 1998	Netherlands	
André Doring; André Döring	GK	0	23 September 1998	FR Yugoslavia	
Émerson; Émerson Ferreira Lopes	GK	0	18 November 1998	Russia	
Alessandro Cambalhota; Alessandro Andrade de Oliveira	MF	0	28 March 1999	South Korea	
Luiz Alberto; Luiz Alberto da Silva Oliveira	DF	0	30 July 1999	New Zealand	
Edu; Luís Eduardo Schimidt	FW	0	23 February 2000	Thailand	
Vágner; Vágner Rogério Nunes	MF	0	31 May 2001	Cameroon	
Geovanni; Geovanni Deiberson Maurício	MF	0	12 July 2001	Mexico	
Roger Machado; Roger Machado Marques	DF	0	12 July 2001	Mexico	
Esquerdinha; Rogério Fonseca da Silva	MF	0	31 January 2002	Bolivia	
Daniel da Silva; Daniel da Silva	DF	0	6 February 2002	Saudi Arabia	
Fábio Luciano; Fábio Luciano	DF	0	11 June 2003	Nigeria	
Dyego Coelho; Dyego Rocha Coelho	DF	0	27 July 2003	Mexico	
Marcelo Bordon; Marcelo José Bordon	DF	0	28 April 2004	Hungary	
Dedé; Leonardo de Deus Santos	DF	0	28 April 2004	Hungary	
Fernando Henrique * Fernando Henrique dos Anjos	GK	0	18 August 2004	Haiti	
Pedrinho; Pedro Paulo de Oliveira	MF	0	18 August 2004	Haiti	
Roger Flores; Roger Galera Flores	MF	2	18 August 2004	Haiti	
Fabiano Eller; Fabiano Eller dos Santos	DF	0	27 April 2005	Guatemala	
Fernandão; Fernando Lúcio da Costa	FW	0	27 April 2005	Guatemala	
Gabriel; Gabriel Rodrigues dos Santos	DF	0	27 April 2005	Guatemala	
Gláuber; Gláuber Leandro Honorato Berti	DF	0	27 April 2005	Guatemala	
Marcinho; Márcio Miranda Freitas Rocha da Silva	MF	0	27 April 2005	Guatemala	
Anderson; Ânderson Cléber Beraldo	DF	1	27 April 2005	Guatemala	
Ilsinho; Ilson Pereira Dias Júnior	MF	0	27 March 2007	Ghana	
Léo Moura; Leonardo da Silva Moura	DF	0	6 February 2008	Republic of Ireland	
Fábio Simplício; Fábio Henrique Simplício	MF	0	17 November 2009	Oman	
Ederson; Ederson Honorato Campos	MF	0	10 August 2010	United States	
Douglas; Douglas dos Santos	MF	0	17 November 2010	Argentina	
Renato Abreu; Carlos Renato de Abreu	MF	0	14 September 2011	Argentina	
Humberlito Borges; Humberlito Borges Teixeira	FW	0	28 September 2011	Argentina	
Bruno Cortez; Bruno Cortês Barbosa	DF	0	28 September 2011	Argentina	
Gabriel * Gabriel Vasconcelos Ferreira	GK	0	15 August 2012	Sweden	
Carlinhos; Carlos Andrade Souza	DF	0	21 November 2012	Argentina	
Durval; Severino dos Ramos Durval da Silva	DF	0	21 November 2012	Argentina	
Dória * Matheus Dória Macedo	DF	0	6 April 2013	Bolivia	
Leandro * Weverson Leandro Oliveira Moura	MF	1	6 April 2013	Bolivia	
Ricardo Goulart; Ricardo Goulart Pereira Cruz	FW	0	9 September 2014	Ecuador	
Mário Fernandes; Mário Figueira Fernandes	DF	0	14 October 2014	Japan	
Camilo * Fernando Camilo Farias	MF	0	25 January 2017	Colombia	
Gustavo Scarpa * Gustavo Henrique Scarpa Furtado	MF	0	25 January 2017	Colombia	
Jorge * Jorge Marco de Oliveira Moraes	DF	0	25 January 2017	Colombia	
Willian Arão * Willian Souza Arão da Silva	MF	0	25 January 2017	Colombia	
Cássio * Cássio Ramos	GK	0	10 November 2017	Japan	
Neto * Norberto Murara Neto	GK	0	11 September 2018	El Salvador	
Matheus Henrique * Matheus Henrique de Souza	MF	0	10 October 2019	Senegal	
Wesley * Wesley Moraes Ferreira da Silva	FW	0	15 November 2019	Argentina	
Arthur * Arthur Augusto de Matos Soares	DF	0	25 March 2023	Morocco	
Yuri Alberto * Yuri Alberto Monteiro da Silva	FW	0	25 March 2023	Morocco	
Paulinho * Paulo Henrique Sampaio Filho	MF	0	16 November 2023	Colombia	
Nino * Marcílio Florêncio Mota Filho	DF	0	21 November 2023	Argentina	
Pablo Maia * Pablo Gonçalves Maia Fortunato	MF	0	23 March 2024	England	
Galeno * Wenderson Rodrigues do Nascimento Galeno	MF	0	26 March 2024	Spain	
Matheus Pereira * Matheus Fellipe Costa Pereira	MF	0	15 October 2024	Peru	
Murillo * Murillo Santiago Costa dos Santos	DF	0	25 March 2025	Argentina	
Kaio Jorge * Kaio Jorge Pinto Ramos	FW	0	4 September 2025	Chile	
Jean Lucas * Jean Lucas de Souza Oliveira	MF	0	9 September 2025	Bolivia	
Gabriel Sara * Gabriel Davi Gomes Sara	MF	0	26 March 2026	France	
Kaiki Bruno * Kaiki Bruno da Silva	DF	0	31 March 2026	Croatia	
Otávio * Otávio Eleodoro Rezende Costa	GK	0	29 September 2026	Australia	
André * André Luiz Santos Dias	MF	0	14 November 2026	Japan	
Jonathan Jesus * Jonathan de Jesus Alves	DF	0	14 November 2026	Japan	
Marlon Gomes * Marlon Gomes Claudino	MF	0	14 November 2026	Japan	
Alisson Santana * Alisson Santana Lopes da Fonseca	FW	0	14 November 2026	Japan	

== See also ==
- List of Brazil international footballers
- List of Brazil international footballers (6–19 caps)
- List of Brazil international footballers (2–5 caps)
