= Football at the 1963 Pan American Games =

Football – Men's tournament at the 1963 Pan American Games
- Venue: Pacaembu Stadium
- Dates: 20 April – 4 May

Medalists
| Gold medal | Brazil |
| Silver medal | Argentina |
| Bronze medal | Chile |

The fourth edition of the football tournament at the Pan American Games was held in São Paulo, Brazil, from 20 April to 4 May 1963. Five teams competed in a round-robin competition, with Argentina being the defending champions. Brazil, Argentina and Chile qualified for the tournament at the beginning of the year, while Peru and Paraguay did not.

Matches were held in Estádio Comendador Sousa and Estádio Parque São Jorge, both in São Paulo.

== Teams ==
- Argentina
- Brazil
- Chile
- United States
- Uruguay

== Final table ==
| Team | Pts | Pld | W | D | L | GF | GA | GD |
|---|---|---|---|---|---|---|---|---|
| Brazil | 7 | 4 | 3 | 1 | 0 | 18 | 3 | +15 |
| Argentina | 6 | 4 | 2 | 2 | 0 | 11 | 3 | +8 |
| Chile | 5 | 4 | 2 | 1 | 1 | 12 | 6 | +6 |
| Uruguay | 2 | 4 | 1 | 0 | 3 | 4 | 6 | −2 |
| United States | 0 | 4 | 0 | 0 | 4 | 3 | 30 | −27 |

== Matches ==
20 April

| Chile | 10–2 | United States |
|---|---|---|
| Bell 8' (o.g.); Barrera 51', 65'; Araneda 57'; Torres 67'; González 73', 85'; Esquivel 74', 89'; Lavín 90' | Report | Murphy 24', 59' |

Estádio Comendador Sousa, São Paulo
Referee: Joao Etzel (Brazil)

22 April

| Argentina | 8–1 | United States |
|---|---|---|
| Sarnari 5', 9', 45', 55'; Ferreño 25'; Oleniak 33', 85', 87' | Report | Ronge 52' |

Parque São Jorge, São Paulo
Referee: Eunapio Quiros (Brazil)

24 April

| Brazil | 3–1 | Uruguay |
|---|---|---|
| Othon 7'; Beleza 12', 85' | Report | Varela 57' |

Parque São Jorge, São Paulo
Referee: Leo Goldstein (United States)

26 April

| Argentina | 0–0 | Chile |
|---|---|---|
| | Report |

Estádio Comendador Sousa, São Paulo
Referee: Leo Goldstein (United States)

28 April

| Brazil | 10–0 | United States |
|---|---|---|
| Othon 6'; Beleza 10', 47', 57', 62', 65', 76', 87'; Nené 35'; Jairzinho 40' | Report |

Parque São Jorge, São Paulo
Referee: Joao Etzel (Brazil)

28 April

| Argentina | 1–0 | Uruguay |
|---|---|---|
| Manfredi 58' | Report |

Estádio Comendador Sousa, São Paulo
Referee: Armando Marques (Brazil)

30 April

| Brazil | 3–0 | Chile |
|---|---|---|
| Jairzinho 9'; Othon 26'; Beleza 60' | Report |

Parque São Jorge, São Paulo
Referee: Leo Goldstein (United States)

2 May

| United States | 0–2 | Uruguay |
|---|---|---|
| | Report | Curbelo 85'; Pérez 87' |

Parque São Jorge, São Paulo
Referee: Roberto Goicoechea (Argentina)

4 May

| Brazil | 2–2 | Argentina |
|---|---|---|
| Beleza 60'; Othon 75' | Report | Oleniak 87'; Manfredi 88' |

Parque São Jorge, São Paulo
Referee: Carlos Vicuña (Chile)

4 May

| Chile | 2–1 | Uruguay |
|---|---|---|
| Torres 20'; Lavin 59' | Report | Gil Rivero 13' |

Estádio Comendador Sousa, São Paulo
Referee: René Fernandes (Brazil)

== Medalists ==
| Event | Gold | Silver | Bronze |
|---|---|---|---|
| Men's tournament | Brazil: 1. Adevaldo; 2. Aírton Beleza; 3. Arlindo; 4. Carlos Alberto; 5. Nené; 6. Décio; 7. Dirceu; 8. Evaldo; 9. Heitor; 10. Hélio Dias; 11. Iris; 12. Jairzinho; 13. Joaquim; 14. Zé Carlos; 15. Luiz Henrique; 16. Menotti; 17. Othon; 18. Riva; 19. Zanin; 20. Valdir; Antonio Fernandes (HC) | Argentina: 1. Abel Vieytez (DF); 2. Agustín Cejas (GK); 3. Enry Barale (DF); 4. Héctor Sabás (FW); 5. José Magiolo (DF); 6. José Paflik (DF); 7. Juan C. Guzmán (DF); 8. Juan Carlos Oleniak (FW); 9. Juan C. Sarnari (FW); 10. Néstor Sanguinetti (MF); 11. Néstor Manfredi (FW); 12. Osmar Miguelucci (GK); 13. Osvaldo Ferreño (FW); 14. Raúl O. Pérez (FW); 15. Raúl Salvio (DF); 16. Reynaldo Aimonetti (FW); 17. Roberto Canosa (DF); 18. Roberto Santiago (MF); 19. Roberto Telch (MF); 20. Sergio Cantú (FW); Ernesto Duchini (HC) | Chile: 1. Carlos Lavín; 2. Domingo Araneda; 3. Domingo Barrera; 4. Gilberto Traslaviña; 5. Gregorio Silva; 6. Haroldo Peña; 7. Héctor Dávila; 8. Héctor Holz; 9. Ismael Manterola; 10. Juan Carlos Esquivel; 11. Juan Torres; 12. José Sánchez; 13. Manuel Montecinos; 14. Óscar Cifuentes; 15. Pedro Bustamante; 16. Pedro González; 17. Ramón Valencia; 18. Raúl Angulo; 19. Raúl Guevara; 20. Víctor Pacheco; Raúl Pino (HC) |

1963 Pan American Games winners

Brazil
First title

== Goalscorers ==
There were 48 goals scored in 10 matches, for an average of 4.8 goals per match.

11 goals

- (Brazil) Aírton

4 goals

- (Argentina) Juan Carlos Oleniak
- (Argentina) Juan Carlos Sarnari
- (Brazil) Othon

2 goals

- (Argentina) Néstor Manfredi
- (Brazil) Jairzinho
- (Chile) Domingo Barrera
- (Chile) Juan Esquivel
- (Chile) Carlos Lavín
- (Chile) Pedro González
- (Chile) Juan Torres
- (United States) Ed Murphy

1 goal

- (Argentina) Osvaldo Ferreño
- (Brazil) Nene
- (Chile) Domingo Araneda
- (United States) Walter Ronge
- (Uruguay) Julio César Curbelo
- (Uruguay) Héctor Pérez
- (Uruguay) Gil Rivero
- (Uruguay) Luis Varela

1 own goal

- (United States) Donald Bell (against Chile)

Source: RSSSF
