= 1964 CONMEBOL Pre-Olympic Tournament =

Tournament details
- Dates: 8 May – 7 June 1964
- Teams: 7

Final positions
- Champions: Argentina
- Runners-up: Brazil
- Third place: Peru
- Fourth place: Colombia

The 1964 CONMEBOL Pre-Olympic Tournament took place during May and June 1964. It was the 2nd CONMEBOL Pre-Olympic Tournament.

Bolivia, Paraguay and Venezuela did not participate. Argentina and Brazil qualified for the 1964 Summer Olympics.

During the match between Argentina and Peru on 24 May 1964, after a goal scored by Peru was disallowed, fans tried to invade the pitch. The police threw gas to contain disturbances, which led to a stampede, causing 328 deaths.After this incident, all of the remaining matches of the tournament were cancelled.

== Standings ==
Pos	Team	Pld	W	D	L	GF	GA	GD	Pts	Qualification
1	Argentina	5	5	0	0	11	1	+10	10	Qualification for 1964 Summer Olympics
2	Brazil	3	2	1	0	6	2	+4	5	Advance to second place play-off
3	Peru	4	2	1	1	6	2	+4	5	Advance to second place play-off
4	Colombia	6	1	2	3	6	10	−4	4	
5	Uruguay	5	0	3	2	3	7	−4	3	
6	Chile	4	1	1	2	2	6	−4	3	
7	Ecuador	5	0	2	3	4	10	−6	2	

Source: RSSSF
8 May 1964

Peru	1–1	Ecuador
Lobatón 65'	Report	Rangel 28'

Estadio Nacional del Perú, Lima
8 May 1964

Argentina	2–0	Colombia
Malleo 50', 74'	Report

Estadio Nacional del Perú, Lima
8 May 1964

Uruguay	0–0	Chile
	Report

Estadio Nacional del Perú, Lima
10 May 1964

Peru	3–0	Colombia
Zegarra (?)	Report

Estadio Nacional del Perú, Lima
11 May 1964

Argentina	1–0	Ecuador
Pérez 10'	Report

Estadio Nacional del Perú, Lima
11 May 1964

Brazil	2–0	Chile
Othon (?); Soares (?)	Report

Estadio Nacional del Perú, Lima
Referee: Alberto Tejada Burga (Peru)
14 May 1964

Uruguay	1–1	Ecuador
Avellaneda 23'	Report	Landázuri 38'

Estadio Nacional del Perú, Lima
14 May 1964

Brazil	1–1	Colombia
Nélio (?)	Report	Padilla (?)

Estadio Nacional del Perú, Lima
Referee: Jorge Cruzat (Chile)
16 May 1964

Argentina	4–0	Chile
Bulla (?); Manfredi (?); Malleo (?)	Report

Estadio Nacional del Perú, Lima
17 May 1964

Peru	2–0	Uruguay
	Report

Estadio Nacional del Perú, Lima
18 May 1964

Colombia	0–2	Chile
	Report	Tabilo 37'; Chávez 45'

Estadio Nacional del Perú, Lima
19 May 1964

Brazil	3–1	Ecuador
Zé Roberto 60', 70'; Nélio 76'	Report	Ordóñez 58'

Estadio Nacional del Perú, Lima
20 May 1964

Colombia	4–1	Ecuador
Caicedo 11', 68'; Caro 23'; Varela 90'	Report	Ordóñez 55'

Estadio Nacional del Perú, Lima
20 May 1964

Argentina	3–1	Uruguay
Bulla 16', 76', 77'	Report	Varela 88'

Estadio Nacional del Perú, Lima
23 May 1964

Uruguay	1–1	Colombia
Fontora 77'	Report	Guerrero 45'

Estadio Nacional del Perú, Lima
24 May 1964

Peru	0–1	Argentina
	Report	Manfredi 60'

Estadio Nacional del Perú, Lima
Attendance: 53,000
Referee: Ángel Eduardo Pazos (Uruguay)

Match abandoned at 85'.

26 May 1964

Chile	Cancelled	Ecuador

26 May 1964

Brazil	Cancelled	Uruguay

28 May 1964

Argentina	Cancelled	Brazil

28 May 1964

Peru	Cancelled	Chile

31 May 1964

Peru	Cancelled	Brazil

== Second place play-off ==
Team 1	Score	Team 2
Brazil	4–0	Peru

7 June 1964

Brazil	4–0	Peru
Zé Roberto 20', 30'; Evaldo 45', 84'	Report

Maracanã Stadium, Rio de Janeiro
Referee: Gottfried Dienst (Switzerland)

Brazil qualified for the Summer Olympics.

== Goalscorers ==
There were 42 goals scored in 17 matches, for an average of 2.47 goals per match.

4 goals

- (Argentina Olympic football team) José Malleo
- (Argentina Olympic football team) Carlos Alberto Bulla
- (Brazil Olympic football team) Zé Roberto

3 goals

- (Peru Olympic football team) Víctor Zegarra

2 goals

- (Brazil Olympic football team) Nélio
- (Ecuador Olympic football team) Kléber Ordóñez
- (Colombia Olympic football team) Diego Caicedo
- (Argentina Olympic football team) Néstor Manfredi
- (Brazil Olympic football team) Evaldo

1 goal

- (Peru Olympic football team) Víctor Lobatón
- (Ecuador Olympic football team) Simón Rangel
- (Argentina Olympic football team) Ricardo Ramón Pérez
- (Brazil Olympic football team) Othon
- (Brazil Olympic football team) Ivo Soares
- (Uruguay Olympic football team) Raúl Avellaneda
- (Ecuador Olympic football team) Felipe Landázuri
- (Colombia Olympic football team) Efraín Padilla
- (Chile Olympic football team) Daniel Tabilo
- (Chile Olympic football team) Julio Chávez
- (Colombia Olympic football team) Juan Caro
- (Colombia Olympic football team) Héctor Varela
- (Uruguay Olympic football team) Antonio Varela
- (Colombia Olympic football team) D. Guerrero
- (Uruguay Olympic football team) Luis Fontora
