= Barale =

Barale is an Italian surname. Notable people with the surname include:

- Enry Juan Barale (born 1941), Argentine footballer
- Germano Barale (born 1936), Italian racing cyclist
- Oreste Barale (1904–1982), Italian footballer and manager
- Paola Barale (born 1967), Italian actress
