= Rodrigues (footballer, born 1946) =

Brazilian footballer

Personal information
- Full name: José Rodrigues dos Santos
- Date of birth: 31 July 1946
- Place of birth: Conde, Brazil
- Date of death: 19 July 2015 (aged 68)
- Place of death: Conde, Brazil
- Position: Left winger

Senior career*
| Years | Team | Apps | (Gls) |
| 1964–1969 | Flamengo | 81 | (8) |
| 1968–1969 | → Cruzeiro (loan) | 88 | (15) |
| 1970–1972 | Cruzeiro | 69 | (13) |
| 1972 | Vasco da Gama | | |
| 1973 | Atlético Mineiro | 26 | (8) |
| 1973 | Portuguesa | | |
| 1975 | Noroeste | | |

International career
| 1968 | Brazil | 1 | (1) |
- * Club domestic league appearances and goals as of 20 April 2024

José Rodrigues dos Santos (31 July 1946 – 19 July 2015), simply known as Rodrigues, was a Brazilian professional footballer who played as a left winger.

== Career ==
Left winger, Rodrigues had spells for major Brazilian football teams, most notably for Flamengo, where he made 81 appearances and was state champion in 1965, and for Cruzeiro, where he won the state championships in 1968 and 1969. He also played for Vasco da Gama, Atlético Mineiro, Portuguesa and Noroeste.

He also played a match for the Brazil national team, on 11 August 1968, when players who acting in Minas Gerais were called up to face Argentina. Rodrigues scored one of the goals of the match.

== Honours ==
Flamengo

- Campeonato Carioca: 1965

Cruzeiro

- Campeonato Mineiro: 1968, 1969

== Death ==
Rodrigues passed away in his hometown, Conde, Bahia, after suffering a sudden illnes, on 19 July 2015.
