= Zanin =

Zanin is a surname. Notable people with the surname include:

- Bruno Zanin (born 1951), Italian actor and writer
- Cristiano Zanin (born 1976), Brazilian lawyer
- Mario Zanin (bishop) (1890–1958), papal diplomat
- Mario Zanin (cyclist) (born 1940), Italian cyclist
- Santo Zanin (born 1943), Brazilian footballer
- Valentin Zanin (born 1937), Soviet rower

== See also ==
- 21301 Zanin, a main-belt minor planet
- Zanini, a surname
