= Garfield McMahon =

Canadian sports shooter (1932–2023)

Gary McMahon
Personal information
- Full name: Garfield Walter McMahon
- Born: 25 February 1932 Roland, Manitoba, Canada
- Died: 7 November 2023 (aged 91) Dartmouth, Nova Scotia, Canada
- Height: 169 cm (5 ft 7 in)
- Weight: 64 kg (141 lb)
- Spouse: Ruby Bertha McMahon (m. 1972)

Sport
- Country: Canada
- Sport: Sports shooting
Medal record
Men's shooting
Representing Canada
Pan American Games
Bronze medal – third place	1959 Chicago	50m pistol team
Bronze medal – third place	1959 Chicago	25m center fire pistol
Silver medal – second place	1963 São Paulo	50m pistol
Silver medal – second place	1963 São Paulo	50m pistol team
Silver medal – second place	1963 São Paulo	25m center fire pistol team
Bronze medal – third place	1963 São Paulo	25m center fire pistol
Silver medal – second place	1971 Cali	25m center fire pistol team
Commonwealth Games
Bronze medal – third place	1966 Kingston	50m pistol team

Garfield Walter McMahon (25 February 1932 – 7 November 2023) was a Canadian sports shooter. He competed at the 1960 Summer Olympics and the 1964 Summer Olympics.

== Personal life and death ==
McMahon was born on 25 February 1932 and was raised in Roland, Manitoba. He married Ruby Bertha (Fulton) McMahon in 1972. He died in Dartmouth, Nova Scotia on 7 November 2023, at the age of 91.
