= List of Brazil international footballers =

The Brazil national football team represents the country of Brazil in international association football. It is fielded by the Brazilian Football Confederation (CBF), the governing body of football in Brazil, and competes as a member of CONMEBOL, which encompasses the countries of South America. As hundreds of players have played for the team since it started officially registering its players, only players with 20 or more official caps are included.

Nine players – Cafu, Thiago Silva, Roberto Carlos, Dani Alves, Lúcio, Cláudio Taffarel, Neymar, Marquinhos and Robinho – have won 100 or more caps for Brazil.

== Key ==
Positions key
GK	Goalkeeper
DF	Defender
MF	Midfielder
FW	Forward

Player
This colour background and the * symbol indicate that the player is currently active at the club level.
Position
Playing positions are listed according to the player's primary position while playing for the national team.
Caps and goals
Caps and goals comprise all those in official "A" international matches as recognised by the CBF. This includes competitive matches (FIFA World Cup qualifying and final tournaments, FIFA Confederations Cup, CONCACAF Gold Cup, etc.) and international friendly matches.

== Players ==
Brazil national football team players with at least 20 caps
Player	Position	Caps	Goals	Debut		Last or most recent match		Pos. ref.
Player	Position	Caps	Goals	Date	Opponent	Date	Opponent	Pos. ref.
Cafu; Marcos Evangelista de Morais	DF	143	5	12 September 1990	Spain	1 July 2006	France	
Neymar * Neymar da Silva Santos Júnior	FW	130	80	10 August 2010	United States	5 July 2026	Norway	
Roberto Carlos; Roberto Carlos da Silva	DF	127	10	26 February 1992	United States	1 July 2006	France	
Dani Alves; Daniel Alves da Silva	DF	126	8	10 October 2006	Ecuador	5 December 2022	South Korea	
Thiago Silva * Thiago Emiliano Silva	DF	113	7	12 October 2008	Venezuela	9 December 2022	Croatia	
Marquinhos * Marcos Aoas Corrêa	DF	112	7	16 November 2013	Honduras	3 October 2026	India	
Lúcio; Lucimar da Silva Ferreira	DF	105	4	15 November 2000	Colombia	5 September 2011	Ghana	
Cláudio Taffarel; Cláudio André Mergen Taffarel	GK	102	0	7 July 1988	Australia	12 July 1998	France	
Robinho; Robson de Souza	FW	100	28	13 July 2003	Mexico	25 January 2017	Colombia	
Ronaldo; Ronaldo Luís Nazário de Lima	FW	99	62	23 March 1994	Argentina	7 June 2011	Romania	
Djalma Santos; Dejalma dos Santos	DF	98	3	10 April 1952	Peru	9 June 1968	Uruguay	
Ronaldinho * Ronaldo de Assis Moreira	MF	97	33	26 June 1999	Latvia	24 April 2013	Chile	
Gilmar; Gylmar dos Santos Neves	GK	93	0	1 March 1953	Bolivia	12 June 1969	England	
Dida; Nélson de Jesus Silva	GK	93	0	7 July 1995	Ecuador	1 July 2006	France	
Gilberto Silva; Gilberto Aparecido da Silva	MF	93	3	7 November 2001	Bolivia	2 July 2010	Netherlands	
Pelé; Edison Arantes do Nascimento	FW	92	77	7 July 1957	Argentina	18 July 1971	Yugoslavia	
Rivellino; Roberto Rivellino	MF	92	26	21 November 1965	Hungary	24 June 1978	Italy	
Kaká; Ricardo Izecson dos Santos Leite	MF	92	29	31 January 2002	Bolivia	29 May 2016	Panama	
Dunga; Carlos Caetano Bledorn Verri	MF	91	6	19 May 1987	England	12 July 1998	France	
Casemiro * Carlos Henrique Casimiro	MF	91	10	14 September 2011	Argentina	5 July 2026	Norway	
Júlio César; Júlio César Soares de Espíndola	GK	87	0	8 July 2004	Chile	12 July 2014	Netherlands	
Zé Roberto; José Roberto da Silva Júnior	MF	84	6	12 August 1995	South Korea	1 July 2006	France	
Aldair; Aldair Nascimento dos Santos	DF	83	3	15 March 1989	Ecuador	28 June 2000	Uruguay	
Alisson Becker * Alisson Ramses Becker	GK	83	0	13 October 2015	Venezuela	5 July 2026	Norway	
Jairzinho; Jair Ventura Filho	MF	82	35	7 June 1964	Portugal	3 March 1982	Czechoslovakia	
Émerson Leão; Émerson Leão	GK	80	0	8 March 1970	Argentina	30 April 1986	Yugoslavia	
Juan; Juan Silveira dos Santos	DF	79	7	15 July 2001	Peru	2 July 2010	Netherlands	
Bebeto; José Roberto Gama de Oliveira	FW	77	40	28 April 1985	Peru	12 July 1998	France	
Rivaldo; Rivaldo Vitor Borba Ferreira	MF	76	35	16 December 1993	Mexico	19 November 2003	Uruguay	
Maicon; Maicon Douglas Sisenando	DF	76	7	13 July 2003	Mexico	5 September 2014	Colombia	
Nílton Santos; Nílton dos Santos	DF	75	3	17 April 1949	Colombia	17 June 1962	Czechoslovakia	
Danilo * Danilo Luiz da Silva	DF	75	1	14 September 2011	Argentina	5 July 2026	Norway	
Emerson; Émerson Ferreira da Rosa	MF	73	6	10 September 1997	Ecuador	27 June 2006	Ghana	
Branco; Cláudio Ibrahim Vaz Leal	DF	72	9	25 April 1985	Colombia	22 February 1995	Slovakia	
Gérson; Gérson de Oliveira Nunes	MF	71	14	7 May 1961	Chile	9 July 1972	Portugal	
Zico; Arthur Antunes Coimbra	MF	71	48	25 February 1976	Uruguay	21 June 1986	France	
Romário; Romário de Souza Faria	FW	71	55	23 May 1987	Republic of Ireland	27 April 2005	Guatemala	
Willian * Willian Borges da Silva	MF	70	9	10 November 2011	Gabon	15 November 2019	Argentina	
Léo Júnior; Leovegildo Lins Gama Júnior	DF	69	6	17 May 1979	Paraguay	16 December 1992	Germany	
Didi; Waldir Pereira	MF	68	20	6 April 1952	Mexico	17 June 1962	Czechoslovakia	
Philippe Coutinho * Philippe Coutinho Correia	MF	68	21	7 October 2010	Iran	2 June 2022	South Korea	
Lucas Paquetá * Lucas Tolentino Coelho de Lima	MF	67	13	7 September 2018	United States	29 June 2026	Japan	
Jorginho; Jorge Amorim de Oliveira Campos	DF	65	4	21 June 1987	Ecuador	9 August 1995	Japan	
Gabriel Jesus * Gabriel Fernando de Jesus	FW	64	19	1 September 2016	Ecuador	21 November 2023	Argentina	
Denílson; Denílson de Oliveira	MF	61	9	13 November 1996	Cameroon	12 February 2003	China	
Sócrates; Sócrates Brasileiro Sampaio de Souza Vieira de Oliveira	MF	60	22	17 May 1979	Paraguay	21 June 1986	France	
Careca; Antônio de Oliveira Filho	FW	60	29	21 March 1982	West Germany	1 August 1993	Venezuela	
Oscar; José Oscar Bernardi	DF	59	2	1 April 1978	France	7 May 1986	Chile	
Mauro Silva; Mauro da Silva	MF	59	0	27 March 1991	Argentina	5 September 2001	Argentina	
Paulo Cézar Caju; Paulo Cezar Lima	MF	58	7	19 September 1967	Chile	10 July 1977	Peru	
Marcelo; Marcelo Vieira da Silva Júnior	DF	58	6	5 September 2006	Wales	6 July 2018	Belgium	
Miranda; João Miranda de Souza Filho	DF	58	3	1 April 2009	Peru	2 July 2019	Argentina	
Vinícius Júnior * Vinícius José Paixão de Oliveira Júnior	MF	58	16	10 September 2019	Peru	14 November 2026	Japan	
Toninho Cerezo; Antônio Carlos Cerezo	MF	57	5	9 March 1977	Colombia	30 June 1985	Bolivia	
David Luiz * David Luiz Moreira Marinho	DF	57	3	10 August 2010	United States	13 June 2017	Australia	
Müller; Luiz Antônio Correia da Costa	FW	56	12	12 March 1986	West Germany	23 September 1998	FR Yugoslavia	
Leonardo Araújo; Leonardo Nascimento de Araújo	MF	56	7	17 October 1990	Chile	15 August 2001	Paraguay	
Paulinho; José Paulo Bezerra Maciel Júnior	MF	56	13	14 September 2011	Argentina	20 November 2018	Cameroon	
Tostão; Eduardo Gonçalves de Andrade	FW	55	32	15 May 1966	Chile	9 July 1972	Portugal	
Zinho; Crizan Cezar de Oliveira Filho	MF	55	7	15 March 1989	Ecuador	15 February 1998	Jamaica	
Roberto Firmino * Roberto Firmino Barbosa de Oliveira	FW	55	17	12 November 2014	Turkey	10 July 2021	Argentina	
Carlos Alberto Torres; Carlos Alberto Torres	DF	54	8	30 May 1964	England	20 March 1977	Paraguay	
Richarlison * Richarlison de Andrade	MF	54	20	7 September 2018	United States	14 October 2025	Japan	
Zizinho; Thomaz Soares da Silva	MF	53	30	17 January 1942	Argentina	3 April 1957	Argentina	
Fernandinho; Fernando Luiz Roza	MF	53	2	10 August 2011	Germany	18 June 2019	Venezuela	
Éder Aleixo; Éder Aleixo de Assis	MF	52	8	17 May 1979	Paraguay	1 April 1986	Peru	
Juninho Paulista; Oswaldo Giroldo Júnior	MF	52	4	22 February 1995	Slovakia	12 October 2003	Jamaica	
Bruno Guimarães * Bruno Guimarães Rodriguez Moura	MF	52	4	17 November 2020	Uruguay	14 November 2026	Japan	
Hilderaldo Bellini; Hideraldo Luiz Bellini	DF	51	0	13 April 1957	Peru	15 July 1966	Hungary	
Wilson Piazza; Wilson da Silva Piazza	DF	51	0	25 June 1967	Uruguay	4 October 1975	Peru	
Ramires; Ramires Santos do Nascimento	MF	51	4	6 June 2009	Uruguay	9 September 2014	Ecuador	
Garrincha; Manoel dos Santos	MF	50	12	18 September 1955	Chile	15 July 1966	Hungary	
Elano; Elano Blumer	MF	50	9	13 October 2004	Colombia	17 July 2011	Paraguay	
Raí; Raí Souza Vieira de Oliveira	MF	49	16	19 May 1987	England	29 April 1998	Argentina	
Hulk * Givanildo Vieira de Sousa	MF	49	11	14 November 2009	England	9 September 2021	Peru	
Alex; Alexsandro de Souza	MF	48	12	23 September 1998	FR Yugoslavia	12 October 2005	Venezuela	
Roque Júnior; José Vítor Roque Júnior	DF	48	2	9 October 1999	Netherlands	12 November 2005	United Arab Emirates	
Adriano; Adriano Leite Ribeiro	FW	48	27	15 November 2000	Colombia	2 March 2010	Republic of Ireland	
Oscar; Oscar dos Santos Emboaba Júnior	MF	48	12	14 September 2011	Argentina	17 November 2015	Peru	
Zé Maria; José Maria Rodrigues Alves	DF	47	0	20 June 1968	Poland	17 May 1978	Czechoslovakia	
César Sampaio; Carlos César Sampaio Campos	MF	47	6	8 November 1990	Chile	15 November 2000	Colombia	
Flávio Conceição; Flávio da Conceição	MF	47	4	8 November 1995	Argentina	3 September 2000	Bolivia	
Júlio Baptista; Júlio César Baptista	MF	47	5	4 June 2001	Japan	25 June 2010	Portugal	
Brito; Hercules Britto Ruas	DF	46	0	30 May 1964	England	9 July 1972	Portugal	
Ricardo Gomes; Ricardo Gomes Raymundo	DF	46	4	10 June 1984	England	12 June 1994	El Salvador	
Valdo; Valdo Cândido de Oliveira Filho	MF	46	4	19 May 1987	England	8 August 1993	Mexico	
Alex Sandro * Alex Sandro Lobo Silva	DF	46	2	10 November 2011	Gabon	24 June 2026	Scotland	
Zito; José Ely de Miranda	MF	45	3	17 November 1955	Paraguay	25 June 1966	Scotland	
Edinho; Edino Nazareth Filho	DF	45	3	9 March 1977	Colombia	21 June 1986	France	
Luís Fabiano; Luís Fabiano Clemente	FW	45	28	11 June 2003	Nigeria	6 February 2013	England	
Luisão; Ânderson Luís da Silva	DF	44	3	23 July 2001	Honduras	10 November 2011	Gabon	
Filipe Luís; Filipe Luís Kasmirski	DF	44	2	14 October 2009	Venezuela	27 June 2019	Paraguay	
Raphinha * Raphael Dias Belloli	MF	44	12	7 October 2021	Venezuela	14 November 2026	Japan	
Edu; Jonas Eduardo Américo	MF	42	8	5 June 1966	Poland	22 June 1974	Zaire	
Renato Gaúcho; Renato Portaluppi	MF	42	5	1 September 1983	Ecuador	16 December 1993	Mexico	
Márcio Santos; Márcio Roberto dos Santos	DF	41	5	12 September 1990	Spain	30 May 1997	Norway	
Luiz Gustavo * Luiz Gustavo Dias	MF	41	2	10 August 2011	Germany	29 May 2016	Panama	
Amaral; João Justino Amaral dos Santos	DF	40	0	6 August 1975	Argentina	29 June 1980	Poland	
Juninho Pernambucano; Antônio Augusto Ribeiro Reis Júnior	MF	40	6	28 March 1999	South Korea	1 July 2006	France	
Jair; Jair Rosa Pinto	FW	39	22	5 March 1940	Argentina	29 January 1956	Paraguay	
Ademir de Menezes; Ademir Marques de Menezes	FW	39	31	21 January 1945	Colombia	15 March 1953	Uruguay	
Rildo; Rildo da Costa Menezes	DF	39	1	2 May 1963	Netherlands	31 August 1969	Paraguay	
Félix; Félix Mieli Venerando	GK	39	0	21 November 1965	Hungary	26 April 1972	Paraguay	
Clodoaldo; Clodoaldo Tavares Santana	MF	39	1	12 June 1969	England	28 April 1974	Greece	
Marco Antônio; Marco Antônio Feliciano	DF	39	0	4 March 1970	Argentina	31 October 1979	Paraguay	
Ricardo Rocha; Ricardo Roberto Barreto da Rocha	DF	39	0	19 May 1987	England	22 February 1995	Slovakia	
Vampeta; Marcos André Batista Santos	MF	39	2	23 September 1998	FR Yugoslavia	21 August 2002	Paraguay	
Edmílson; Edmílson José Gomes de Moraes	DF	39	1	18 July 2000	Paraguay	5 June 2007	Turkey	
Fred; Frederico Chaves Guedes	FW	39	18	27 April 2005	Guatemala	8 July 2014	Germany	
Roberto Dinamite; Carlos Roberto de Oliveira	FW	38	20	30 September 1975	Peru	17 June 1984	Argentina	
Batista; João Batista da Silva	MF	38	0	5 April 1978	West Germany	22 June 1983	Sweden	
Éder Militão * Éder Gabriel Militão	DF	38	2	11 September 2018	El Salvador	18 November 2025	Tunisia	
Carlos Gallo; Carlos Roberto Gallo	GK	37	0	29 June 1980	Poland	21 June 1993	Chile	
Antônio Carlos Zago; Antônio Carlos Zago	DF	37	3	30 October 1991	Yugoslavia	1 July 2001	Uruguay	
Edmundo; Edmundo Alves de Souza Neto	FW	37	9	31 July 1992	Mexico	15 November 2000	Colombia	
Lucas Moura * Lucas Rodrigues Moura da Silva	MF	37	4	27 March 2011	Scotland	10 September 2024	Paraguay	
Rodrygo * Rodrygo Silva de Góes	MF	37	9	15 November 2019	Argentina	18 November 2025	Tunisia	
Paulo Isidoro; Paulo Isidoro de Jesus	MF	36	3	19 June 1977	Poland	28 July 1983	Chile	
Alemão; Ricardo Rogério de Brito	MF	36	6	17 June 1983	Switzerland	24 June 1990	Argentina	
Fabinho * Fábio Henrique Tavares	MF	36	0	7 June 2015	Mexico	29 June 2026	Japan	
Zózimo; Zózimo Alves Calazans	MF	35	1	13 November 1955	Paraguay	17 June 1962	Czechoslovakia	
Mazinho; Iomar do Nascimento	MF	35	0	10 May 1989	Peru	17 July 1994	Italy	
Gilberto; Gilberto da Silva Melo	DF	35	1	11 June 2003	Nigeria	2 July 2010	Netherlands	
Elias; Elias Mendes Trindade	MF	35	0	7 October 2010	Iran	12 June 2016	Peru	
Pepe; José Macia	MF	34	16	8 July 1956	Argentina	19 May 1963	Israel	
Luizinho; Luiz Carlos Ferreira	DF	34	2	27 August 1980	Uruguay	12 December 1987	West Germany	
Paulo Silas; Paulo Silas do Prado Pereira	MF	34	1	16 March 1986	Hungary	16 December 1992	Germany	
Diego; Diego Ribas da Cunha	MF	34	4	30 April 2003	Mexico	25 January 2017	Colombia	
Mário Zagallo; Mário Jorge Lobo Zagallo	MF	33	4	4 May 1958	Paraguay	7 June 1964	Portugal	
Renato Augusto; Renato Soares de Oliveira Augusto	MF	33	6	9 February 2011	France	16 November 2018	Uruguay	
Luís Pereira; Luiz Edmundo Pereira	DF	32	0	6 June 1973	Tunisia	14 July 1977	Bolivia	
Carlos Mozer; José Carlos Nepomuceno Mozer	DF	32	0	28 July 1983	Chile	23 March 1994	Argentina	
Kléberson; José Kléberson Pereira	MF	32	2	31 January 2002	Bolivia	28 June 2010	Chile	
Fred * Frederico Rodrigues de Paula Santos	MF	32	0	12 November 2014	Turkey	9 December 2022	Croatia	
Ederson * Ederson Santana de Moraes	GK	32	0	10 October 2017	Chile	31 May 2026	Panama	
Tita; Mílton Queiroz da Paixão	MF	31	6	2 August 1979	Argentina	5 May 1990	Bulgaria	
André Cruz; André Alves da Cruz	DF	31	1	3 August 1988	Austria	3 June 1998	Andorra	
Douglas Costa * Douglas Costa de Souza	MF	31	3	12 November 2014	Turkey	20 November 2018	Cameroon	
Orlando Peçanha; Orlando Peçanha de Carvalho	DF	30	0	18 May 1958	Bulgaria	19 July 1966	Portugal	
Reinaldo; José Reinaldo de Lima	FW	29	11	30 July 1975	Venezuela	21 May 1985	Chile	
Gil; Gilberto Alves	FW	29	6	7 April 1976	Paraguay	24 June 1978	Italy	
Rui Campos; Ruy Campos	MF	28	2	14 May 1944	Uruguay	28 June 1950	Switzerland	
Mauro Ramos; Mauro Ramos de Oliveira	DF	28	0	10 April 1949	Bolivia	21 November 1965	Soviet Union	
Joel Camargo; Joel Camargo	DF	28	0	30 May 1964	England	4 October 1970	Chile	
Paulo Roberto Falcão; Paulo Roberto Falcão	MF	28	6	27 February 1976	Argentina	6 June 1986	Algeria	
Renato; Renato Dirnei Florêncio	MF	28	0	7 September 2003	Colombia	9 October 2005	Bolivia	
Josué; Josué Anunciado de Oliveira	MF	28	1	27 March 2007	Ghana	25 June 2010	Portugal	
Matheus Cunha * Matheus Santos Carneiro da Cunha	FW	28	4	2 September 2021	Chile	5 July 2026	Norway	
Baltazar; Oswaldo da Silva	FW	27	16	7 May 1950	Paraguay	10 February 1956	Uruguay	
Julinho; Júlio Botelho	MF	27	12	6 April 1952	Mexico	7 September 1965	Uruguay	
Marinho Chagas; Francisco das Chagas Marinho	DF	27	4	25 June 1973	Sweden	26 June 1977	Yugoslavia	
Waldir Peres; Waldir Peres de Arruda	GK	27	0	4 October 1975	Peru	5 July 1982	Italy	
Zé Maria; José Marcelo Ferreira	DF	27	1	12 January 1996	Canada	9 June 2001	Australia	
Marcos; Marcos Roberto Silveira Reis	GK	27	0	13 November 1999	Spain	22 June 2005	Japan	
Alexandre Pato; Alexandre Rodrigues da Silva	FW	27	10	26 March 2008	Sweden	15 October 2013	Zambia	
Hernanes; Ânderson Hernanes de Carvalho Andrade Lima	MF	27	2	26 March 2008	Sweden	12 July 2014	Netherlands	
Gabriel Martinelli * Gabriel Teodoro Martinelli Silva	MF	27	5	24 March 2022	Chile	5 July 2026	Norway	
Bauer; José Carlos Bauer	MF	26	0	3 April 1949	Ecuador	20 September 1955	Chile	
Dirceu; Dirceu José Guimarães	MF	26	4	13 June 1973	Austria	7 May 1986	Chile	
Leandro; José Leandro Sousa Ferreira	DF	26	2	28 October 1981	Bulgaria	7 May 1986	Chile	
Domingos da Guia; Domingos Antônio da Guia	DF	25	0	6 September 1931	Uruguay	10 February 1946	Argentina	
Danilo Alvim; Danilo Alvim Faria	MF	25	2	28 February 1945	Chile	27 March 1953	Paraguay	
Carlos Castilho; Carlos José Castilho	GK	25	0	7 May 1950	Paraguay	24 April 1962	Paraguay	
Zé Sérgio; José Sérgio Presti	MF	25	5	1 May 1978	Peru	15 May 1981	France	
Everton Soares * Everton Sousa Soares	MF	25	3	7 September 2018	United States	10 July 2021	Argentina	
Gabriel Magalhães * Gabriel dos Santos Magalhães	DF	25	1	8 September 2023	Bolivia	14 November 2026	Japan	
Endrick * Endrick Felipe Moreira de Sousa	FW	25	4	16 November 2023	Colombia	14 November 2026	Japan	
Everaldo; Everaldo Marques da Silva	DF	24	0	25 June 1967	Uruguay	26 April 1972	Paraguay	
Mauro Galvão; Mauro Geraldo Galvão	DF	24	0	1 April 1986	Peru	24 June 1990	Argentina	
Sávio; Sávio Bortolini Pimentel	MF	24	6	4 May 1994	Iceland	28 June 2000	Uruguay	
Marcelo Gonçalves; Marcelo Gonçalves Costa Lopes	DF	24	1	28 August 1996	Russia	27 June 1998	Chile	
Júnior Baiano; Raimundo Ferreira Ramos Júnior	DF	24	2	10 August 1997	South Korea	12 July 1998	France	
Mineiro; Carlos Luciano da Silva	MF	24	0	25 April 2001	Peru	18 June 2008	Argentina	
Nilmar; Nilmar Honorato da Silva	FW	24	9	13 July 2003	Mexico	7 June 2011	Romania	
Lucas Leiva; Lucas Pezzini Leiva	MF	24	0	22 August 2007	Algeria	19 November 2013	Chile	
André Santos; André Clarindo dos Santos	DF	24	0	15 June 2009	Egypt	24 April 2013	Chile	
Tesourinha; Osmar Fortes Barcellos	FW	23	10	14 May 1944	Uruguay	14 May 1950	Uruguay	
Roberto Dias; Roberto Dias Branco	DF	23	1	28 April 1963	France	17 December 1968	Yugoslavia	
Edílson; Edílson da Silva Ferreira	FW	23	6	24 June 1993	Paraguay	21 August 2002	Paraguay	
Juliano Belletti; Juliano Haus Belletti	DF	23	1	28 March 2001	Ecuador	5 June 2005	Paraguay	
Nílton de Sordi; Nílton de Sordi	DF	22	0	17 November 1955	Paraguay	11 May 1961	Chile	
Amarildo; Amarildo Tavares da Silveira	FW	22	7	30 April 1961	Paraguay	25 June 1966	Scotland	
Renato; Carlos Renato Frederico	MF	22	3	26 July 1979	Bolivia	12 December 1987	West Germany	
Geovani Silva; Geovani Faria da Silva	MF	22	5	2 May 1985	Uruguay	11 September 1991	Wales	
Felipe Melo; Felipe Melo de Carvalho	MF	22	2	10 February 2009	Italy	2 July 2010	Netherlands	
Jefferson; Jéfferson de Oliveira Galvão	GK	22	0	14 September 2011	Argentina	8 October 2015	Chile	
Éverton Ribeiro * Everton Augusto de Barros Ribeiro	MF	22	3	5 September 2014	Colombia	2 December 2022	Cameroon	
Arthur Melo * Arthur Henrique Ramos de Oliveira Melo	MF	22	1	7 September 2018	United States	29 March 2022	Bolivia	
Vavá; Edvaldo Izídio Neto	FW	21	15	13 November 1955	Paraguay	3 June 1964	Argentina	
Leivinha; João Leiva Campos Filho	FW	21	7	28 June 1972	Czechoslovakia	22 June 1974	Zaire	
Nelinho; Manoel Rezende de Mattos Cabral	DF	21	6	28 April 1974	Greece	29 June 1980	Poland	
Ricardinho; Ricardo Luís Pozzi Rodrigues	MF	21	1	28 March 2000	Colombia	27 June 2006	Ghana	
Kléber; Kléber de Carvalho Corrêa	DF	21	1	31 January 2002	Bolivia	28 September 2011	Argentina	
Zezé Procópio; José Procópio Mendes	MF	20	0	5 June 1938	Poland	10 February 1946	Argentina	
Norival; Norival Pereira da Silva	DF	20	1	10 March 1940	Argentina	10 February 1946	Argentina	
Moacir Barbosa; Moacir Barbosa do Nascimento	GK	20	0	16 December 1945	Argentina	12 March 1953	Ecuador	
Serginho Chulapa; Sérgio Bernardino	FW	20	8	31 May 1979	Uruguay	5 July 1982	Italy	
Luís Henrique; Luís Henrique Pereira dos Santos	MF	20	7	8 November 1990	Chile	5 September 1993	Venezuela	
Vágner Love; Vágner Silva de Souza	FW	20	4	11 July 2004	Costa Rica	21 November 2007	Uruguay	
Jô; João Alves de Assis Silva	FW	20	5	5 June 2007	Turkey	12 July 2014	Netherlands	
Douglas Luiz * Douglas Luiz Soares de Paulo	MF	20	0	19 November 2019	South Korea	3 October 2026	India	

== See also ==
- List of Brazil international footballers (6–19 caps)
- List of Brazil international footballers (2–5 caps)
- List of Brazil international footballers (1 cap)
