= Zanini =

Zanini is a surname. Notable people with the surname include:

- Andrés Zanini (born 1997), Argentine footballer
- Antonia Zanini (16th–17th century), Italian alleged witch
- Emanuele Zanini (born 1965), Italian volleyball coach
- Lino Zanini (1909–1997), Italian Catholic prelate
- Marcel Zanini (1923–2023), French jazz clarinetist
- Marco Zanini (born 1971), Italian fashion designer
- Maria Zanini (1865–after 1894), Italian seamstress, cook, and anarchist militant
- Mario Zanini (1907–1971), Brazilian painter and interior designer
- Matteo Zanini (born 1994), Italian footballer
- Nicola Zanini (born 1974), Italian footballer
- Stefano Zanini (born 1969), Italian cyclist

== See also ==
- Zanin, a surname
- Carlos Zannini, Argentine politician
