= Kim Welshons =

American synchronized swimmer

Personal information
- Born: 1951 Carlsbad, California, U.S.
- Died: March 15, 2015 (aged 64) Carlsbad, California, U.S.

Sport
- Sport: Synchronized swimming
Medal record
Representing United States
Pan American Games
Gold medal – first place	1963 São Paulo	Team

Kim Welshons (1951 – March 15, 2015) was an American synchronized swimming competitor. She won 13 national titles and was part of the American team that won a gold medal at the 1963 Pan American Games. She was 12 at the time, and remains the youngest gold medalist at the Pan American Games. After retiring in 1970, she coached the Mexico national team for two years and served as technical spokesperson for major U.S. television networks for eight years. In 1971, she was inducted into the U.S. Synchronized Swimming Hall of Fame and in 1988 into the International Swimming Hall of Fame. She died of pancreatic cancer in 2015, aged 64.

== See also ==
- List of members of the International Swimming Hall of Fame
