= Rowing at the 1963 Pan American Games =

- Venue: Jurubatuba
- Start date: April 28, 1963
- End date: April 28, 1963
- No. of events: 7 (7 men)
- Competitors: 110 from 8 nations

The rowing competition was held on April 28 on the Jurubatuba course. Due to the small number of competitors all races were finals.

== Medal summary ==
=== Medal table ===
Rank	Nation	Gold	Silver	Bronze	Total
1	United States	4	1	1	6
2	Argentina	1	2	2	5
3	Uruguay	1	0	1	2
4	Canada	1	0	0	1
5	Brazil	0	4	2	6
Totals (5 entries)		7	7	6	20

=== Men's events ===
Event	Gold	Silver	Bronze
Single sculls	Seymour Cromwell; United States	Ivan Pital; Brazil	None awarded
Double sculls	Bill Knecht; Robert Lea; United States	Alberto Demiddi; Antonio Nestar Soma; Argentina	Ventura Rebarl; Antonio Salvagno; Brazil
Coxed pair-oared shells	Edward Ferry; Conn Findlay; Charles Blitzer (cox); United States	Natalia Pablo Rossi; Pedro Juan Lier; Oscar Carlos A. Rampani (cox); Argentina	Antemidia Anselma Julioo; Audifax Barbosa; Adriana Monteiro Soares (cox); Brazil
Coxless pair-oared shells	Mariana Coulin; Gustava Perez; Uruguay	Daniel B. Watts; Robert Brayton; United States	Ricardo Duran; Carlos R. Montaldo; Argentina
Coxed four-oared shells	Juan Jose Retegui; Ismael Santana; Juan Manuel Diaz; Roberto Anibal Gilardi; Gustava Adrian de Marzi (cox); Argentina	Antemidio Anselma Julioo; Audifax Barbosa; Assis Garcia Ramos; Alberto Blemer; Silvia Augusta de Souza (cox); Brazil	Roy Rubin; Gene Philips; Walter Wiberg; William Flint; Bernard Horton (cox); United States
Coxless four-oared shells	Geza Berger; Charles Bower; Charles Haltz; Ted Nash; United States	Brazil; Brazil	Argentina; Argentina
Eight-oared shells	Canada; Canada	Brazil; Brazil	Uruguay; Uruguay
