= Arlindo (footballer, born 1940) =

Brazilian footballer (born 1940)

Personal information
- Full name: Arlindo dos Santos Cruz
- Date of birth: 26 April 1940 (age 86)
- Place of birth: Ilhéus, Brazil
- Position: Midfielder

Senior career*
Years	Team	Apps	(Gls)
1957–1961	Vitória		
1962–1964	Botafogo		
1965–1967	América (MEX)		
1968–1969	Pachuca		
1970–1971	Toluca		
1972	São Cristóvão		
1973–1974	Madureira		

International career
1963	Brazil	4	(0)
Medal record
Men's Football
Representing Brazil
Pan American Games
Gold medal – first place	1963 São Paulo
- * Club domestic league appearances and goals

Arlindo dos Santos Cruz (Note: This name uses Portuguese naming customs: the first or maternal family name is dos Santos and the second or paternal family name is Cruz.) (born 26 April 1940), known as just Arlindo, is a Brazilian former footballer.

== Club career ==
Born in Ilhéus, Bahia, Arlindo began his career in the youth sector of EC Vitória in 1957. In 1962 he joined Botafogo, where he won the state championship and the Rio-São Paulo Tournament. In 1964 he moved to Mexican football, where he made history.

On 29 May 1966, Arlindo scored the first goal ever of Estadio Azteca, in the friendly match of America against Torino. He also played for Pachuca and Toluca, until in 1972 he returned to Rio de Janeiro, where he ended his career with São Cristóvão FR and Madureira EC.

== International career ==
Arlindo was part of the Brazil national team that competed in the 1963 Pan American Games, where the team won the gold medal.

== Honours ==
Botafogo

- Campeonato Carioca: 1962
- Torneio Rio-São Paulo: 1964

Brazil Olympic

- Pan American Games: 1963
