= Athletics at the 1963 Pan American Games – Women's javelin throw =

Women's javelin throw at the Pan American Games

The women's javelin throw event at the 1963 Pan American Games was held at the Pacaembu Stadium in São Paulo on 27 April.

== Results ==
Rank	Name	Nationality	Result	Notes
1st place, gold medalist(s)	Marlene Ahrens	Chile	49.93	
2nd place, silver medalist(s)	Frances Davenport	United States	47.22	
3rd place, bronze medalist(s)	Iris dos Santos	Brazil	35.51	
4	Patricia Dobie	Canada	35.22	
	Shirley Watanabe	Brazil	NM	
	Smiliana Dezulovic	Chile	NM	
	RaNae Bair	United States	NM	
