= Normandes =

Brazilian footballer (born 1947)

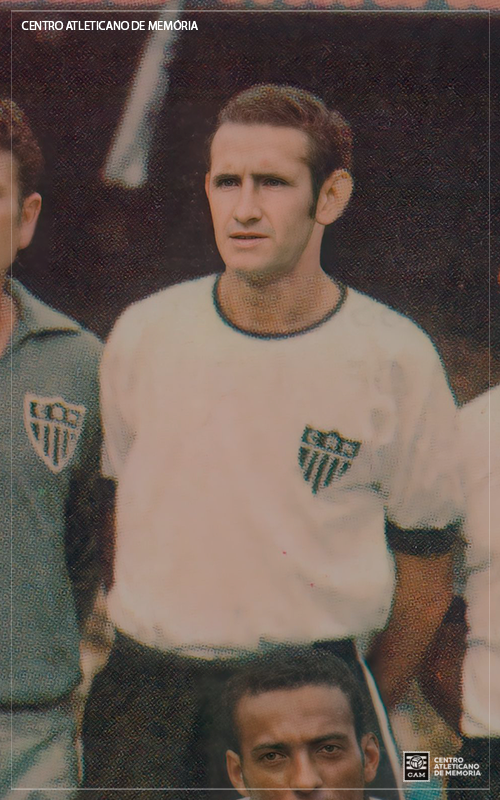
- Normandes in the late 1960s

Personal information
- Full name: Onormandes Souza Lima
- Date of birth: 11 September 1945 (age 81)
- Place of birth: Campo Florido, Minas Gerais, Brazil
- Position: Defender

Youth career
- 1960–1961: Rio Branco

Senior career*
Years	Team	Apps	(Gls)
1962–1964	Nacional–SP		
1965–1968	Independiente–MG		
1968–1974	Atlético Mineiro	168	(0)
1975	Cruzeiro		
1976	Uberaba		

International career
1968	Brazil	1	(0)
- * Club domestic league appearances and goals

Onormandes Souza Lima (born 11 September 1945), more commonly known as Normandes is a retired Brazilian footballer. He played as a defender for clubs such as Nacional–SP, Independiente and Atlético Mineiro throughout the 1960s and the 1970s.

== Career ==
Normandes would begin his career in 1960 as he would drop out of his second year of dentistry course to pursue a football career as he played for Rio Branco. He would then play for Nacional–SP beginning in 1962. He would then play for Independiente–MG from 1965 to 1968 before being sold to Atlético Mineiro for Cr$110,000. He would describe Cruzeiro midfielder Dirceu Lopes as being one of the most difficult players he attempted man-mark throughout his career with Atlético Mineiro. Throughout his tenure with the club, he would oversee the club win the 1970 Campeonato Mineiro as well as the 1971 Campeonato Brasileiro Série A. He would play alongside other players such as Renato, Humberto Monteiro, Grapete, Vantuir, Wanderley Paiva, Humberto Ramos, Oldair, Dadá Maravilha, Ronaldo Drummond and Spencer Coelho as he would make 168 appearances by the time of his departure from the club. He would have brief spells playing for Cruzeiro and Uberaba before retiring in 1976.

He made one appearance for the Brazil national team in 1968.

== Personal life ==
At some point, Normandes would marry his wife Valéria and have three children with her. He currently works as a dentist with one of his sons at Taguatinga.
