= Víctor Lobatón =

Peruvian footballer and manager (1943–1990)

Personal information
- Full name: Víctor Lobatón Gálvez
- Date of birth: 15 June 1943
- Place of birth: Chincha Alta, Peru
- Date of death: 1990 (aged 46–47)
- Place of death: Lima, Peru
- Position: Left winger

Senior career*
Years	Team	Apps	(Gls)
1963–1969	Universitario	82	(24)
?–1973	Atlético Chalaco		

International career
1964	Peru Olympic		
1967	Peru	2	(0)

Managerial career
- 1975–?: Atlético Chalaco
- 1980: Atlético Chalaco
- 1985–1988: Octavio Espinosa
- * Club domestic league appearances and goals

Víctor Lobatón Gálvez (15 June 1943 – 1990) was a Peruvian football player and manager.

He is part of a famous Peruvian football family, the Lobatón, which includes Abel Lobatón Vesgas (his cousin), Abel Lobatón Espejo and Carlos Lobatón.

== Playing career ==
=== Club career ===
Víctor Kilo Lobatón began his career on 15 September 1963, with Universitario de Deportes in a match against Sporting Cristal. Scoring 24 goals in 82 matches for Universitario, he notably won the Peruvian championships in 1964, 1966, 1967 and 1969 and played in four Copa Libertadores tournaments between 1965 and 1968 (25 matches, six goals).

He finished his career with Atlético Chalaco, where he played in the early 1970s (until 1973), winning the Peruvian Second Division in 1972.

=== International career ===
Peruvian international Víctor Lobatón played two friendly matches against Uruguay on July 28 and 30, 1967, without scoring a goal.

Previously, he had played for the Peruvian Olympic team in the 1964 CONMEBOL Pre-Olympic Tournament. He notably participated in the match between Peru and Argentina on 24 May 1964, where he scored a goal that was disallowed by the referee, a decision that sparked riots resulting in 328 deaths and over 500 injuries (see Estadio Nacional disaster).

== Managerial career ==
After becoming a coach, Víctor Lobatón managed his last club as a player, Atlético Chalaco, twice in 1975 and 1980. Between 1985 and 1988, he took charge of Octavio Espinosa of Ica, managing a total of 118 matches in the Peruvian First Division. He died in 1990.

== Honours ==
=== Player ===
Universitario de Deportes

- Peruvian Primera División (4): 1964, 1966, 1967, 1969

Atlético Chalaco

- Peruvian Segunda División: 1972
