= Luiz Henrique (footballer, born 1943) =

Brazilian footballer

Personal information
- Full name: Luiz Henrique Ferreira de Menezes
- Date of birth: 5 September 1943 (age 83)
- Place of birth: Rio de Janeiro, Brazil
- Position: Midfielder

Senior career*
Years	Team	Apps	(Gls)
1963–1966	Fluminense	58	(2)
1966–1967	Botafogo		

International career
1963	Brazil	2	(0)
Medal record
Men's Football
Representing Brazil
Pan American Games
Gold medal – first place	1963 São Paulo
- * Club domestic league appearances and goals

Luiz Henrique Ferreira de Menezes (born 5 September 1943), known as just Luiz Henrique, is a Brazilian former footballer.

== Career ==
Having started his career at Fluminense, he only played for the club and Botafogo during the 1960s, winning the state championship in 1964. After retiring, he worked as a football executive for several other Brazilian football teams.

Luiz Henrique was also part of the Brazil national team that competed in the 1963 Pan American Games, where the team won the gold medal.

== Honours ==
Fluminense

- Campeonato Carioca: 1964

Brazil Olympic

- Pan American Games: 1963
