= Athletics at the 1963 Pan American Games – Men's javelin throw =

Men's javelin throw at the Pan American Games

The men's javelin throw event at the 1963 Pan American Games was held at the Pacaembu Stadium in São Paulo on 4 May.

== Results ==
Rank	Name	Nationality	Result	Notes
1st place, gold medalist(s)	Dan Studney	United States	75.60	
2nd place, silver medalist(s)	Nick Kovalakides	United States	73.71	
3rd place, bronze medalist(s)	Walter de Almeida	Brazil	64.61	
4	Luis Zárate	Peru	64.31	
5	Orlando Garrido	Brazil	61.16	
6	Jesús Rodríguez	Venezuela	61.05	
7	Ricardo Héber	Argentina	60.22	
	Carlos Monges	Peru	DNS	
