= Thomas Smith (sport shooter) =

American sports shooter (1931–2022)

Personal information
- Full name: Thomas Devine Smith III
- Born: October 30, 1931 Sabinal, Texas, U.S.
- Died: May 17, 2022 (aged 90)

Sport
- Country: United States
- Sport: Sports shooting
Medal record
Men's shooting
Representing the United States
Pan American Games
Gold medal – first place	1963 São Paulo	25m center fire pistol
Gold medal – first place	1963 São Paulo	25m center fire pistol team

Thomas Devine Smith III (October 30, 1931 – May 17, 2022) was an American sports shooter. He competed in the 50 metre pistol event at the 1964 Summer Olympics.
