= Bill Knecht =

American rower (1930–1992)

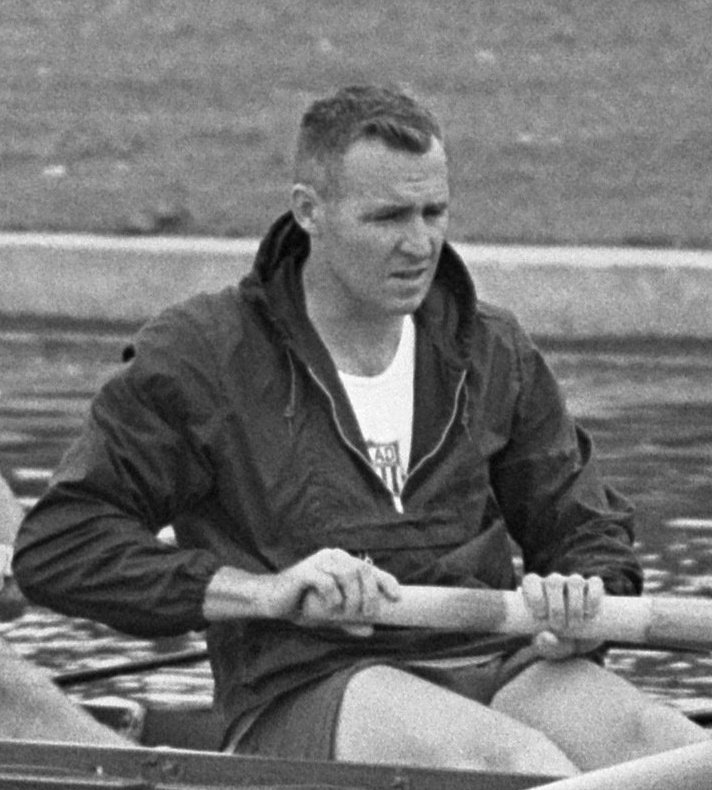
- Knecht at the 1964 European Championships

Personal information
- Full name: William Joseph Knecht
- Born: March 10, 1930 Camden, New Jersey, U.S.
- Died: December 17, 1992 (aged 62) Cheltenham Township, Pennsylvania, U.S.
- Height: 6 ft 0 in (1.83 m)
- Weight: 190 lb (86 kg)

Sport
- Sport: Rowing
- Club: Vesper Boat Club
Medal record
Men's rowing
Representing the United States
Olympic Games
Gold medal – first place	1964 Tokyo	Eight
Pan American Games
Gold medal – first place	1955 Mexico City	Eights
Gold medal – first place	1959 Chicago	Double sculls
Gold medal – first place	1963 São Paulo	Double sculls
European Championships
Silver medal – second place	1958 Poznań	Eight

William Joseph Knecht (March 10, 1930 – December 17, 1992) was an American competition rower. He took up the sport at La Salle University, and later went to Villanova University, graduating in 1951. In 1946, he joined the Vesper Boat Club and won multiple national titles with them. Internationally, he earned gold medals in the eights at the 1955 Pan American Games and 1964 Olympics, and in double sculls at the 1959 and 1963 Pan American Games. He also took part in the double sculls event at the 1960 Olympics, paired with John B. Kelly Jr., but failed to reach the final due to a sudden illness.

In his school years, Knecht was an avid basketball and football player. He was a lifelong friend of Kelly, both being godfathers of each other's sons. By the time of 1964 Olympics Knecht had six children and ran a sheet metal business. He later became a member of the U.S. Olympic Rowing Team Committee, a judge at the 1992 Summer Olympics, and the founder of the Cooper River Rowing Association. He was inducted into the American Rowing Hall of Fame. The annual Knecht Cup Regatta is hosted by the Villanova University in his honor.

== Cited sources ==
- William A Stowe (2005). All Together. iUniverse. ISBN 978-0-595-34388-1.
