= Nick Kovalakides =

American javelin thrower

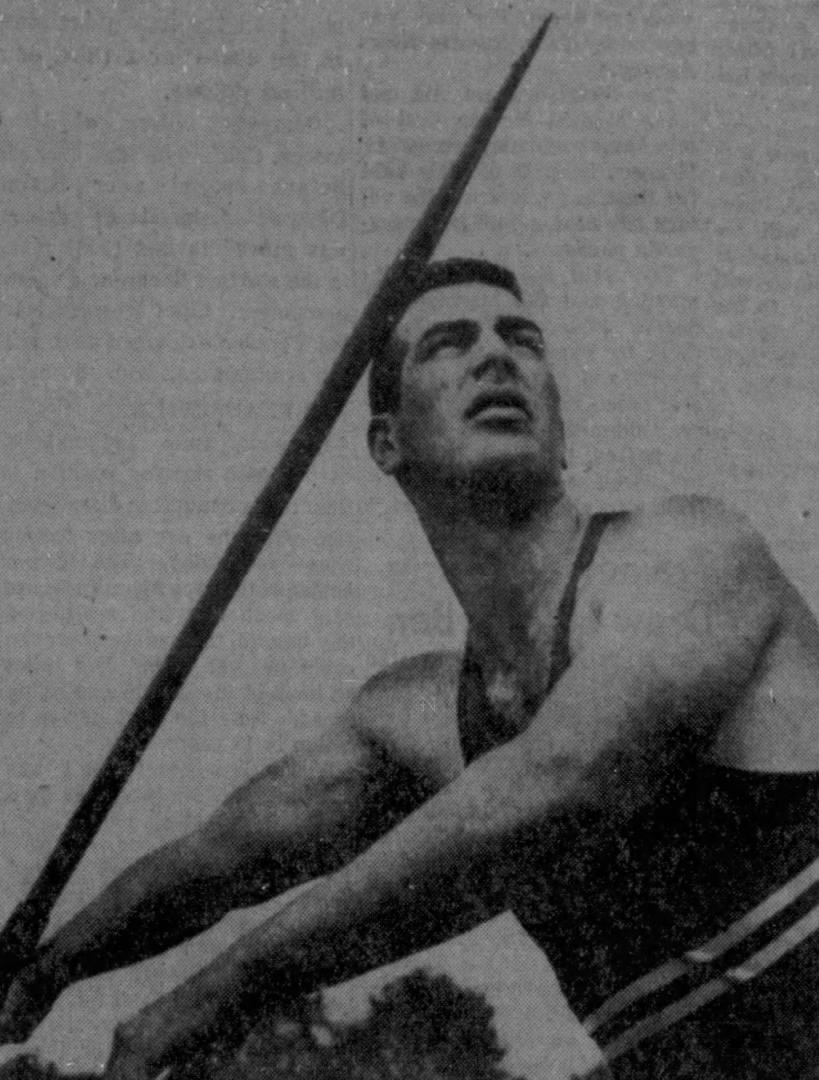
- Kovalakides in 1960

Personal information
- Born: 1939 or 1940 (age 86–87) Princeton, New Jersey, U.S.
- Height: 6 ft 2 (Note: Kovalakides was 6 foot 2 in 1961) in (188 cm)

Sport
- Country: United States
- Sport: Athletics
- Event: Javelin throw
Medal record
Representing United States
Pan American Games
Athletics
Silver medal – second place	1963 São Paulo	Men's javelin throw

Nick Kovalakides (born 1939/1940) is an American javelin thrower.

== Life and career ==
Kovalakides was born in Princeton, New Jersey, the son of Greek immigrants. He attended Princeton High School, graduating in 1957.

Kovalakides was an All-American for the Maryland Terrapins track and field team, finishing 5th in the javelin at the 1959 NCAA Track and Field Championships. He also competed at the 1963 Pan American Games, winning the silver medal in the men's javelin throw event.
