= Estadio Nacional disaster =

May 1964 disaster in Lima, Peru

National Stadium disaster
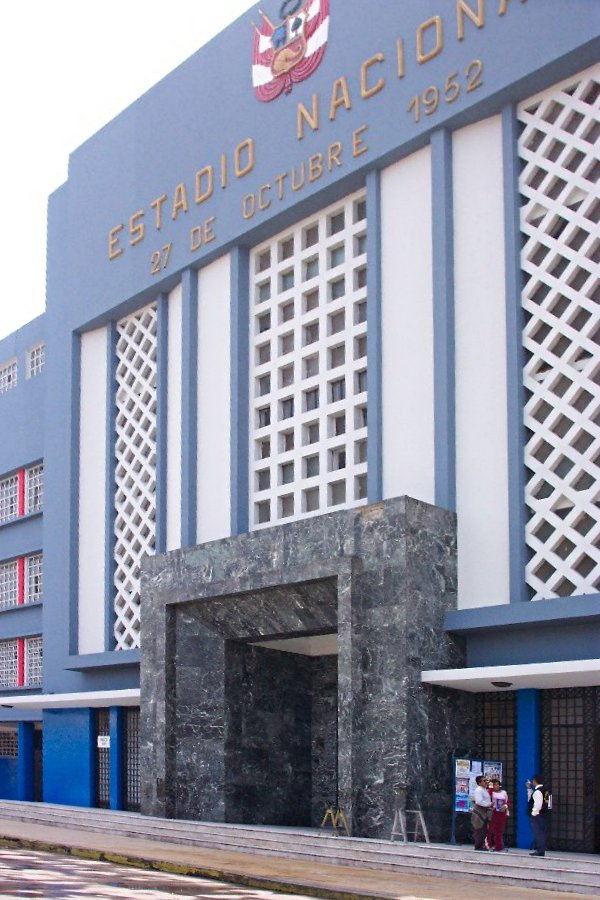
- The stadium's western entrance before the 2011 renovations
- Date: 24 May 1964
- Location: Estadio Nacional, Lima, Peru; 12°04′02.2″S 77°02′01.4″W
- Cause: A stampede as a result of the police gassing the crowd who rebelled against the match.
- Deaths: 328
- Injuries: 500

The Estadio Nacional disaster occurred on 24 May 1964 at the Estadio Nacional (National Stadium) in Lima, Peru, during a match between football teams from Peru and Argentina. An unpopular decision by the referee outraged the Peruvian fans, who invaded the pitch. Police retaliated by shooting tear gas into the crowd, causing a mass exodus. The deaths mainly occurred from people suffering from internal haemorrhaging or asphyxiation from the crushing against the steel shutters that led down to the street. The incident is considered one of the deadliest incidents in the history of association football.

== Background ==
=== Situation in Peru ===
Various political and social tensions were present in Peru leading up to the disaster. Labour disputes and worker demonstrations were present across the country. Leftist and communist forces were quite powerful around the country and frequently clashed with the police. Peasant struggles grew amid agrarian reforms enacted by the government.

=== South American qualifiers ===
On 24 May 1964, Peru hosted Argentina at the Estadio Nacional in Lima. The game, in the qualifying round for the Tokyo Olympics' football tournament, was considered significant for Peruvian football: Peru, then holding the second qualifying place in the CONMEBOL table, would face a tough match against Brazil in their final game. The match attracted a crowd of 53000 to the stadium, a little over 5% of Lima's population at the time.

== Events ==
With Argentina leading 1–0 and six minutes of normal time remaining, a would-be equalising goal by Peru, scored by Víctor Lobatón, was disallowed by Uruguayan referee Ángel Eduardo Pazos. This decision angered the home fans and caused a pitch invasion. An eyewitness described the fans throwing seat cushions and bottles and other objects. Peruvian police shot tear gas canisters into the northern grandstand and fired shots into the air to prevent further fans from invading the field of play. This caused panic and an attempt at a mass exodus to avoid the tear gas.

Rather than standard gates, the stadium had solid corrugated steel shutters at the bottom of tunnels that connected the street level, via several flights of steps, to the seating areas above. These shutters were closed as they normally were at every game. Panicked spectators moving down the enclosed stairways pressed those in the lead against the closed shutters, but this was not visible to the crowd pushing down the stairwells from behind. The shutters finally burst outward as a result of pressure from the crush of bodies inside. All of those that died were killed in the stairwells down to the street level, most from internal haemorrhaging or asphyxia. No one who stayed inside of the stadium died. A baby was born in the stadium at the height of the panic, but it is not known if the child or mother survived.

In the street, the crowd caused destruction to private property around the stadium. Fans set fire to private houses and businesses. Reports indicated some individuals threw paper soaked in petrol into a nearby garage and broke factory and house windows. After a three-hour running battle, mounted police set up a cordon to prevent further damage. Police repelled a mob headed for the home of Commander Jorge de Asumbuja who they accused of ordering the firing of tear gas into the stands. Police repelled another mob headed toward the home of President Fernando Belaunde Terry to protest against police brutality. Crowds gathered outside hospitals and expressed anger toward the police. The following day, on 25 May, police disbanded a small demonstration by students outside San Marcos University, accusing the students of giving inflammatory speeches.

== Aftermath ==
=== Response and reactions ===
To quell the unrest in Lima, the government ordered the suspension of civil liberties, enforced a state of emergency, and imposed a modified form of martial law. A state of national mourning was also ordered. The government attributed the riot to Trotskyist agitators. Pope Paul VI called on fans to subdue their celebrations out of respect for the victims of the disaster.

As of 2026, the Peruvian government has not conducted an in-depth investigation into the disaster.

=== South American qualifiers ===
After the incident, all remaining matches of the CONMEBOL Pre-Olympic Tournament were cancelled. With both Peru and Brazil tied in the points standings, it was decided a playoff game was to be played to determine which team would qualify for the Olympics. Brazil defeated Peru 4-0 and qualified for the Olympics in Tokyo.

=== Death toll ===
The official death toll has been reported as 328, though some sources suggest higher numbers since deaths by gunshot were not counted in the official estimates. Early radio accounts reported 500 had been killed with almost 1000 injured. At 328, the death toll is still greater than the Hillsborough disaster, the Bradford fire, the 1989 Heysel disaster, the 1902 Ibrox disaster, the 1971 Ibrox disaster, and the Burnden Park disaster combined. After the incident, a decision was made to reduce the seating capacity of the stadium from 53000 to 42000 in 1964, although this was later increased to 47000 for the 2004 Copa América.
