= Synchronized swimming at the 1963 Pan American Games =

- No. of events: 3

Synchronized swimming at the 1963 Pan American Games was held from 20 April to 5 May 1963 in São Paulo, Brazil. There were three medal events after the exclusion of the sport in the 1959 Pan American Games.

== Medal table ==
Rank	Nation	Gold	Silver	Bronze	Total
1	United States (USA)	3	2	0	5
2	Mexico (MEX)	0	1	0	1
3	Canada (CAN)	0	0	2	2
4	Brazil (BRA)	0	0	1	1
Totals (4 entries)		3	3	3	9

== Medalists ==
Event	Gold	Silver	Bronze
Solo	Roberta Armstrong; United States	Barbara Burke; United States	Sandra Marks; Canada
Duet	United States (USA); Barbara Burke; Joanne Schaak	United States (USA); Marian Whitner; Marcia Blixt	Canada (CAN); Marilyn Malefant; Sandra Marks
Team	United States (USA); Marcia Blixt; Papsie Georgian; Margaret Laurence; Judy McFadden; Linda McFadden; Kim Welshons; Marian Whitner	Mexico (MEX)	Brazil (BRA); Leny Filelini; Maria Helena Nascimento; Fiametta Palazo; Cecilia Ghezzi; Ana Maria Oliveira; Ignez Barros Porto; Eliana Chaves Uruguai; Ana Luisa Corrêa
