= José Amoroso Filho =

Brazilian footballer

Amoroso
Personal information
- Full name: José Amoroso Filho
- Date of birth: 19 September 1937
- Place of birth: Rio de Janeiro, Brazil
- Date of death: 16 September 2022 (aged 84)
- Place of death: Campos dos Goytacazes, Brazil
- Position: Forward

Youth career
- Botafogo

Senior career*
Years	Team	Apps	(Gls)
1961–1963	Botafogo		
1964–1968	Fluminense	134	(72)
1968–1969	Remo		
1970	Campo Grande		
- * Club domestic league appearances and goals as of 3 February 2024

José Amoroso Filho (19 September 1937 – 16 September 2022), simply known as Amoroso was a Brazilian professional footballer who played as a forward.

== Career ==
Amoroso began his career at Botafogo where he was two-time Rio champion in 1961 and 1962, moving to Fluminense in 1964, where he was again state champion and also top scorer in the Campeonato Carioca in 1964 and 1965. He played for Fluminense from 1964 to 1968, being champion of the 1965 Torneio Início and the 1966 Taça Guanabara, scoring 72 goals in 135 matches. He left Fluminense in a trade with Clube do Remo, for the then promising defender Assis. For Remo he was state champion and of the Torneio do Norte, and scored a goal against SL Benfica in a friendly played in Belém, making the final score 1–1, with the other goal scored by Eusébio.

== Personal life ==
Amoroso is the uncle of the footballer Márcio Amoroso.

== Honours ==
Botafogo

- Campeonato Carioca: 1961, 1962
- Torneio Início: 1962

Fluminense

- Campeonato Carioca: 1964
- Taça Guanabara: 1966

Remo

- Campeonato Paraense: 1968
- Torneio do Norte: 1969

Individual

- 1964 Campeonato Carioca top scorer: 19 goals
- 1965 Campeonato Carioca top scorer: 10 goals

== Death ==
Amoroso died of natural causes, 16 September 2022, aged 84.
