= Shooting at the 1963 Pan American Games =

Shooting at the 1963 Pan American Games lists the results of all firearm-shooting events held at the 1963 Pan American Games in São Paulo, Brazil. Various event formats were included: those involving handguns, rifles, and shotguns (trap).

== Men's events ==
Event	Gold	Silver	Bronze
25 metre center fire pistol	Thomas Smith; United States	William Blackenship; United States	Garfield McMahon; Canada
25 metre rapid fire pistol	Cecil Wallis; United States	Lawrence Mosely; United States	Manuel Fernandez; Argentina
50 metre pistol	Franklin Green; United States	Garfield McMahon; Canada	Alvin Merx; United States
50 metre rifle prone	Enrico Forcella Pelliccioni; Venezuela	Lones Wigger; United States	Edward Caygle; United States
50 metre rifle three positions	Gary Anderson; United States	William Krilling; United States	Paulino Díaz Carrillo; Mexico
50 metre high power rifle three positions	Gary Anderson; United States	Verle Wright; United States	Clinton Dahistron; Canada
Trap	Kenneth Sedlecky; United States	Juan Garcia; Venezuela	Bernard Hartman; Canada

== Team events ==
Event	Gold	Silver	Bronze
25 metre center fire pistol	United States of America; United States	Canada; Canada	Mexico; Mexico
25 metre rapid fire pistol	United States of America; United States	Argentina; Argentina	Mexico; Mexico
50 metre pistol	United States of America; United States	Canada; Canada	Brazil; Brazil
50 metre rifle prone	United States of America; United States	Mexico; Mexico	Venezuela; Venezuela
50 metre rifle three positions	United States of America; United States	Canada; Canada	Peru; Peru
50 metre high power rifle three positions	United States of America; United States	Argentina; Argentina	Brazil; Brazil
Trap	United States of America; United States	Venezuela; Venezuela	Canada; Canada

== Medal table ==
Rank	Nation	Gold	Silver	Bronze	Total
1	United States	13	5	2	20
2	Venezuela	1	2	1	4
3	Canada	0	4	4	8
4	Argentina	0	2	1	3
5	Mexico	0	1	3	4
6	Brazil	0	0	2	2
7	Peru	0	0	1	1
Totals (7 entries)		14	14	14	42
