= Heitor Perroca =

Brazilian footballer (born 1940)

Personal information
- Full name: Heitor Amorim Perroca
- Date of birth: 15 February 1940
- Place of birth: São Geraldo, Minas Gerais, Brazil
- Date of death: 14 August 2018 (aged 78)
- Place of death: Ubatuba, Brazil
- Position: Goalkeeper

Senior career*
Years	Team	Apps	(Gls)
1960–1963	São Cristóvão		
1963–1966	Corinthians	119	(0)
1967	Água Verde		
1968–1969	Juventus-SP		

International career
1963	Brazil	2	(0)
Medal record
Men's Football
Representing Brazil
Pan American Games
Gold medal – first place	1963 São Paulo
- * Club domestic league appearances and goals

Heitor Amorim Perroca (15 February 1940 – 14 August 2018) was a Brazilian footballer.

== Career ==
Heitor Perroca played for the teams São Cristóvão, Corinthians, Água Verde and Juventus. He made 119 appearances for Corinthians.

Perroca also was part of the Brazil national team that competed in the 1963 Pan American Games, where the team won the gold medal.

== Honours ==
Corinthians

- Torneio Rio-São Paulo: 1966

Água Verde

- Campeonato Paranaense: 1967

Brazil Olympic

- Pan American Games: 1963

== Death ==
Perroca died in the city of Ubatuba, 14 August 2018, aged 78.
