= Cardoso (footballer, born 1943) =

Brazilian footballer

Personal information
- Full name: Joaquim Cardoso Neto
- Date of birth: 27 June 1943 (age 83)
- Position: Forward

Senior career*
Years	Team	Apps	(Gls)
1962–1968	América-SP		
1969–1971	Palmeiras	66	(34)
1971–1972	Guarani		
1972–1973	Sport Recife		
1973–1974	Juventus-SP		

International career
1963	Brazil	1	(0)
Medal record
Men's Football
Representing Brazil
Pan American Games
Gold medal – first place	1963 São Paulo
- * Club domestic league appearances and goals

Joaquim Cardoso Neto (Note: This name uses Portuguese naming customs: the first or maternal family name is Cardoso and the second or paternal family name is Neto.) (born 27 June 1943), known as just Cardoso, is a Brazilian former footballer.

Cardoso was part of the Brazil national team that competed in the 1963 Pan American Games, where the team won the gold medal.

== Honours ==
Palmeiras

- Torneio Roberto Gomes Pedrosa: 1969

Brazil Olympic

- Pan American Games: 1963
