= São Geraldo, Minas Gerais =

Brazilian municipality

Coordinates: 20°55′22″S 42°50′02″W

- Municipality
- Flag Coat of arms
- Interactive map of São Geraldo, Minas Gerais
- Country: Brazil
- State: Minas Gerais
- Region: Southeast
- Time zone: UTC−3 (BRT)

Location of São Geraldo

São Geraldo is a municipality in the Brazilian state of Minas Gerais. As of 2020, the estimated population was 12,562.

It was founded on 7 March 1949.

== See also ==
- List of municipalities in Minas Gerais
