= Osvaldo Ferreño =

Argentine footballer

Personal information
- Full name: Osvaldo Antonio Ferreño
- Date of birth: 8 February 1941 (age 85)
- Position: Forward

Senior career*
Years	Team	Apps	(Gls)
- Boca Juniors
- * Club domestic league appearances and goals

Osvaldo Antonio Ferreño (born 8 February 1941) is an Argentine former footballer.
