= Walter Ronge =

American soccer player

Walter Ronge (Rongo in some sources) was a U.S. soccer player who earned one cap with the U.S. national team. Ronge played professionally with Chicago Schwaben of the National Soccer League of Chicago. He earned his one cap with the national team in a 2–0 loss to Colombia on February 5, 1961.
