= Pedro Paulo (footballer, born 1945) =

Brazilian footballer

Personal information
- Full name: Pedro Paulo Teles Marcelino
- Date of birth: 15 August 1945
- Place of birth: Pedro Leopoldo, Brazil
- Date of death: 14 February 2008 (aged 62)
- Place of death: Belo Horizonte, Brazil
- Position: Right back

Youth career
- 1961–1962: Sport Pedro Leopoldo
- 1963–1965: Cruzeiro

Senior career*
Years	Team	Apps	(Gls)
1965–1974	Cruzeiro	405	(4)
1973	→ Caldense (loan)		
1974	Náutico		
1975	Atlético Paranaense		
1976	Paysandu		

International career
1968	Brazil	1	(0)

Managerial career
- 1984: Sete de Setembro-MG
- * Club domestic league appearances and goals as of 8 November 2025

Pedro Paulo Teles Marcelino (15 August 1945 – 14 February 2008), better known as Pedro Paulo, was a Brazilian professional footballer who played as right back.

== Club career ==
Pedro Paulo began his career at Sport Pedro Leopoldo. At 17, he joined Cruzeiro in 1963, becoming part of the professional team in 1965. In total, he made 405 appearances for the team, winning numerous titles. He also played for Náutico, Athletico Paranaense, and Paysandu, and managed Sete de Setembro.

Pedro Paulo was inducted into the Cruzeiro EC Hall of Fame in 2012.

== International career ==
Pedro Paulo played a single match for Brazil national team, against Argentina, on 11 August 1968.

== Honours ==
Cruzeiro

- Campeonato Mineiro: 1965, 1966, 1967, 1968, 1969, 1972, 1973, 1974
- Taça Brasil: 1966
- Taça Minas Gerais: 1973

== Death ==
Pedro Paulo died in Belo Horizonte on 14 February 2008, at age of 62, victim of a stroke.
