= José Malleo =

Argentine footballer

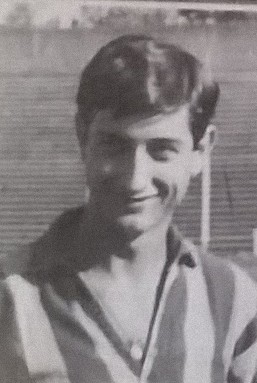

Personal information
- Date of birth: 29 January 1944 (age 82)
- Position: Midfielder

Senior career*
| Years | Team | Apps | (Gls) |
- Rosario Central
- * Club domestic league appearances and goals

José Malleo (born 29 January 1944) is an Argentine former footballer who competed in the 1964 Summer Olympics.
