= Héctor Pueblas =

Argentine footballer

Personal information
- Full name: Héctor Sabás Pueblas
- Date of birth: 8 May 1941
- Date of death: 19 March 2014 (aged 72)
- Position: Forward

Senior career*
Years	Team	Apps	(Gls)
- Boca Juniors
- * Club domestic league appearances and goals

Héctor Sabás Pueblas (born 8 May 1941-death 19 March 2014) is an Argentine former footballer.
