= Evaldo (footballer, born 1945) =

Brazilian footballer

Personal information
- Date of birth: 12 January 1945 (age 81)
- Place of birth: Campos dos Goytacazes, Brazil
- Position: Forward

Youth career
- 1958–1960: Americano

Senior career*
Years	Team	Apps	(Gls)
1961–1966	Fluminense	22	(4)
1966–1971	Cruzeiro		
1971–1974	ESAB		
1974–1977	Cruzeiro		
1977	Marília		
1977	Deportivo Italia		

International career
1963–1964	Brazil Olympic	5	(2)
1968	Brazil	1	(1)

Managerial career
- 1980: América Mineiro
- 1980: Sport Juiz de Fora
- 1994: Cruzeiro (youth)
- 1996: Mamoré
- 1997: Atlético Mineiro (youth)
Medal record
Men's Football
Representing Brazil
Pan American Games
Gold medal – first place	1963 São Paulo
- * Club domestic league appearances and goals

Evaldo Cruz (born 12 January 1945), known as Evaldo, is a Brazilian former football player and manager who played as a forward.

== Club career ==
Born in Campos dos Goytacazes, Evaldo began his career in the youth sectors of Americano FC. In 1961 he joined Fluminense, where he was part of the team that won the state title in 1964. In 1966 he joined Cruzeiro, the team for which he played the most during his career, with two spells, accumulating a total of 302 appearances. He also played for ESAB, Marília and ended his career with Deportivo Italia in Venezuelan football.

== International career ==
Evaldo was part of the Brazil national team that competed in the 1963 Pan American Games, where the team won the gold medal, and in the 1964 CONMEBOL Pre-Olympic Tournament.

Evaldo also played for the A team on 11 August 1968, against Argentina, scoring one of the goals in the match.

== Managerial career ==
Evaldo coached América Mineiro in the early of 1980, and later Sport Juiz de Fora. He left football to take care of personal business and returned in the 1990s, coaching the youth teams of Cruzeiro and Atlético, as well as EC Mamoré in 1996.

== Personal life ==
Evaldo also worked as a sports commentator for TV Alterosa.

== Honours ==
Fluminense

- Campeonato Carioca: 1964

Cruzeiro

- Taça Brasil: 1966
- Campeonato Mineiro: 1966, 1967, 1968, 1969

Brazil Olympic

- Pan American Games: 1963
