= Valdir (footballer, born 1943) =

Brazilian footballer

Personal information
- Full name: Valdir Vicente
- Date of birth: 12 June 1943
- Place of birth: Araxá, Brazil
- Date of death: 31 October 2021 (aged 78)
- Place of death: São Paulo, Brazil
- Position: Defender

Senior career*
Years	Team	Apps	(Gls)
1963–1966	Nacional-SP		
1966–1971	Paulista		
1971–1973	Ponte Preta		
1974	Nacional-SP		
1975	Saad		
1976–1978	Nacional-SP		

International career
1963	Brazil		
Medal record
Men's Football
Representing Brazil
Pan American Games
Gold medal – first place	1963 São Paulo
- * Club domestic league appearances and goals

Valdir Vicente (also spelled Waldir, 12 June 1943 – 31 October 2021), better known as just Valdir, was a Brazilian footballer.

Valdir was part of the Brazil national team that competed in the 1963 Pan American Games, where the team won the gold medal.

== Honours ==
Paulista

- Campeonato Paulista Série A2: 1968

Brazil Olympic

- Pan American Games: 1963
