= Conde, Bahia =

Municipality of Bahia, Brazil

Coordinates: 11.8139°S 37.6108°W

Conde
- Municipality
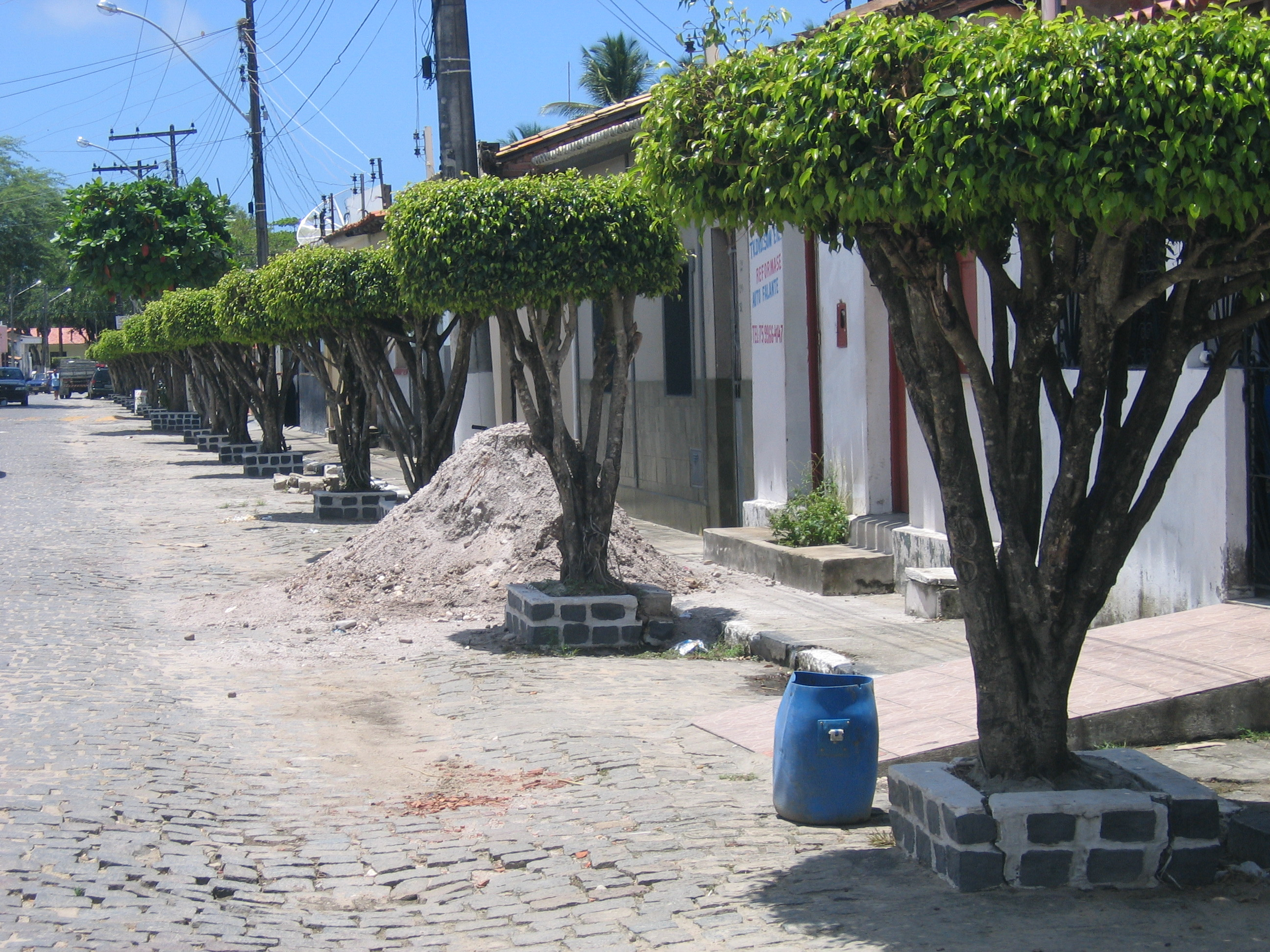

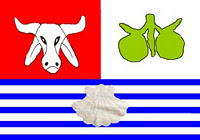
- Flag Coat of arms
- Interactive map of Conde
- Country: Brazil
- Region: Nordeste
- State: Bahia

Population (2020)
  - Total: 26,035
- Time zone: UTC−3 (BRT)

Conde is a municipality in the state of Bahia in the North-East region of Brazil.

== See also ==
- List of municipalities in Bahia
