= Turcão (footballer, born 1926) =

Brazilian footballer

Personal information
- Full name: Alberto Chuairi
- Date of birth: 24 May 1926
- Place of birth: São Paulo, Brazil
- Date of death: 21 April 2013 (aged 86)
- Place of death: São Paulo, Brazil
- Position: Defender

Youth career
- –1943: Palmeiras

Senior career*
Years	Team	Apps	(Gls)
1943–1951	Palmeiras	181	(6)
1951	Guarani		
1951–1957	São Paulo	224	(36)
1958	Santa Cruz		

International career
1955	Brazil	1	(0)
- * Club domestic league appearances and goals

Alberto Chuairi (24 May 1926 – 21 April 2013), simply known as Turcão, was a Brazilian professional footballer who played as a defender. He made one appearance for the Brazil national team in 1955.

== Career ==
Turcão arrived at the youth team of Palestra Itália, and was promoted after the club became the current SE Palmeiras. He stood out for his physical size and strength. In the 1950s, he transferred to rival São Paulo FC, where he managed to repeat part of his success. He scored 36 goals for the club, where he was the official penalty taker. Turcão ended his career at Santa Cruz de Recife after a serious knee injury.

== Honours ==
=== Palmeiras ===
- Campeonato Paulista: 1947, 1950
- Torneio Rio-São Paulo: 1951
- Taça Cidade de São Paulo: 1950

=== São Paulo ===
- Campeonato Paulista: 1953, 1957
- Small Club World Cup: 1955

== Death ==
Turcão died in his apartment at age of 86, due to advanced Alzheimer.
