= Piolim =

Brazilian footballer

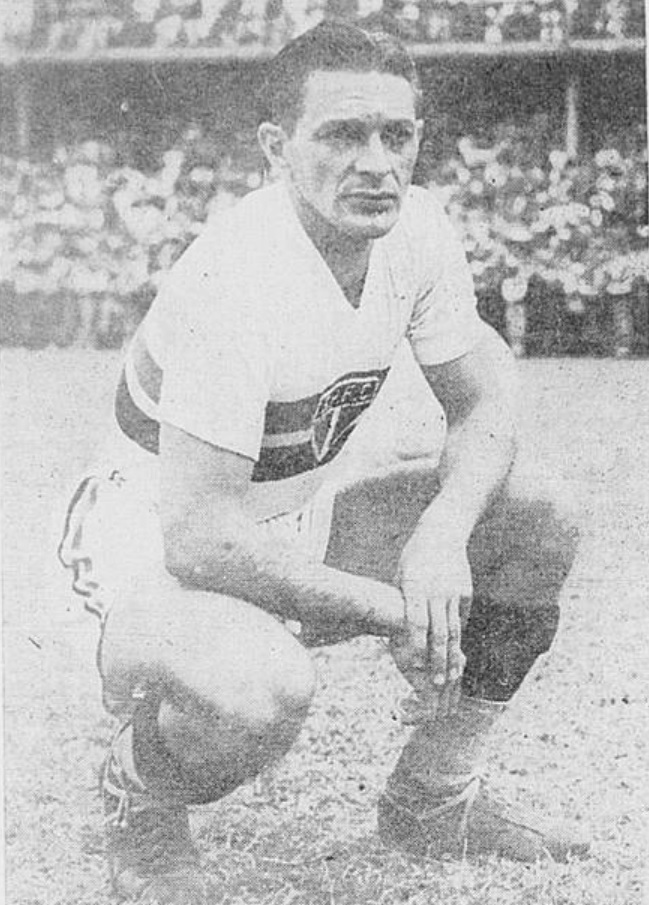
- Piolim in 1943

Personal information
- Full name: Laurindo Furlani
- Date of birth: 22 August 1913
- Place of birth: Casa Branca, Brazil
- Date of death: 18 June 2000 (aged 86)
- Place of death: Batatais, Brazil
- Position: Defender

Youth career
- –1936: Jaboticabal

Senior career*
Years	Team	Apps	(Gls)
1936	Jaboticabal		
1937	Palestra Itália		
1937–1947	São Paulo	152	(0)

International career
1944	Brazil	1	(0)
- * Club domestic league appearances and goals as of 11 September 2023

Laurindo Furlani (22 August 1913 – 18 June 2000), mostly known as Piolim, was a Brazilian professional footballer who played as a defender.

== Career ==
Piolim began his career at Jaboticabal Atlético, and upon gaining prominence, after a short spell at Palestra Itália he was signed by São Paulo FC, where he was the main defender during the club's winning era in the 40s known as "Rolo Compressor".

Pioli also played once time for the Brazil national team, on 14 May 1944, in the 6–1 victory over Uruguay.

== Honours ==
=== São Paulo ===
- Campeonato Paulista: 1943, 1945, 1946
- Taça dos Campeões Estaduais Rio-São Paulo: 1946
- Taça Cidade de São Paulo: 1944
