= Menotti (footballer) =

Brazilian footballer

Personal information
- Full name: Menotti de Tomazzo Sobrinho
- Date of birth: 15 March 1943
- Place of birth: São Paulo, Brazil
- Date of death: 30 October 2022 (aged 79)
- Place of death: São Paulo, Brazil
- Position: Midfielder

Senior career*
Years	Team	Apps	(Gls)
- Palmeiras

International career
1963	Brazil		
Medal record
Men's Football
Representing Brazil
Pan American Games
Gold medal – first place	1963 São Paulo
- * Club domestic league appearances and goals

Menotti de Tomazzo Sobrinho (15 March 1943 – 30 October 2022) was a Brazilian footballer.

== Career ==
Revealed in the SE Palmeiras youth sector, Menotti played in a few matches for the club. He retired when he was less than 25 years old due to a chronic knee injury.

Menotti was also part of the Brazil national team that competed in the 1963 Pan American Games, where the team won the gold medal.
