= Dirceu (footballer, born 1942) =

Brazilian footballer

Personal information
- Full name: Dirceu Alves Ferreira
- Date of birth: 15 April 1942 (age 84)
- Place of birth: São Paulo, Brazil
- Position: Forward

Senior career*
Years	Team	Apps	(Gls)
1961–1965	Palmeiras		

International career
1963	Brazil		
Medal record
Men's Football
Representing Brazil
Pan American Games
Gold medal – first place	1963 São Paulo
- * Club domestic league appearances and goals

Dirceu Alves Ferreira (Note: This name uses Portuguese naming customs: the first or maternal family name is Alves and the second or paternal family name is Ferreira.) (born 15 April 1942) is a Brazilian former footballer.

Dirceu was part of the Brazil national team that competed in the 1963 Pan American Games, where the team won the gold medal.
