= Décio Bianco =

Brazilian footballer (born 1944)

Personal information
- Full name: Décio Antônio Cabo Bianco
- Date of birth: 26 August 1944 (age 82)
- Place of birth: São Paulo, Brazil
- Position: Forward

Senior career*
Years	Team	Apps	(Gls)
- Portuguesa
- Juventus-SP
- Saad
- Flamengo-RS
- Esportivo

International career
1963	Brazil	1	(0)
Medal record
Men's Football
Representing Brazil
Pan American Games
Gold medal – first place	1963 São Paulo
- * Club domestic league appearances and goals

Décio Antônio Cabo Bianco (Note: This name uses Portuguese naming customs: the first or maternal family name is Cabo and the second or paternal family name is Bianco.) (born 26 August 1944) is a Brazilian former footballer.

Décio was part of the Brazil national team that competed in the 1963 Pan American Games, where the team won the gold medal.
