= Aírton Beleza =

Brazilian footballer (1942–1996)

Personal information
- Full name: Aírton Batista dos Santos
- Date of birth: 19 May 1942
- Place of birth: Rio de Janeiro, Brazil
- Date of death: 18 February 1996 (aged 53)
- Place of death: Rio de Janeiro, Brazil
- Position: Forward

Senior career*
Years	Team	Apps	(Gls)
1961–1963	Botafogo		
1963–1966	Flamengo	131	(71)
1965	→ Corinthians (loan)	20	(10)
1967	Botafogo		
1968–1969	Atlético Junior	96	(36)
1970	Millonarios		

International career
1963	Brazil	4	(11)
Medal record
Men's Football
Representing Brazil
Pan American Games
Gold medal – first place	1963 São Paulo
- * Club domestic league appearances and goals

Aírton Batista dos Santos (Note: This name uses Portuguese naming customs: the first or maternal family name is Batista and the second or paternal family name is dos Santos.) (19 May 1942 – 18 February 1996), known as Aírton Beleza, was a Brazilian footballer.

Aírton was part of the Brazil national team that competed in the 1963 Pan American Games, where the team won the gold medal.

== Honours ==
Flamengo

- Campeonato Carioca: 1963, 1965
- Trofeo Naranja: 1964

Botafogo

- Campeonato Carioca: 1967
- Taça Guanabara: 1967

Brazil Olympic

- Pan American Games: 1963
