= Othon (Brazilian footballer) =

Brazilian footballer (1944–2024)

Personal information
- Full name: Othon Valentim Filho
- Date of birth: 20 December 1944
- Place of birth: Leopoldina, Minas Gerais, Brazil
- Date of death: 22 May 2024 (aged 79)
- Place of death: Leopoldina, Minas Gerais, Brazil
- Position: Forward

Senior career*
| Years | Team | Apps | (Gls) |
| 1962–1968 | Botafogo | | |
| 1968 | Internacional | | |
| 1969–1970 | Bahia | | |
| 1970–1971 | Olaria | | |
| 1971 | Junior Barranquilla | | |
| 1972 | Uberlândia | | |

International career
| 1963–1964 | Brazil Olympic | 8 | (4) |

Managerial career
- 1972: Ribeiro Junqueira
- 1973–1975: Botafogo (assistant)
- 1976–1978: Botafogo
- 1973–1975: Botafogo (assistant)
- 1980: Botafogo
- 1980: Al-Shabab
- 1981–1983: Al-Hilal
- 1984–1985: Al-Wahda
- 1986: América Mineiro
- 1987: Al Jazira
- 1989: Fluminense
- 1990: Joinville
- 1991: Al-Hilal
- 1992: Entrerriense
- 1993: Botafogo
- 1993–1994: São José-SP
- 1995: Al-Wahda
- 1996: Goiás
- 1997: Goiânia
- 1998–1999: Atlético Goianiense
- 2000: Al-Shabab
- 2001: Goiânia
- 2002: Al-Ettifaq
- 2003: Joinville
- 2004–2005: Ribeiro Junqueira
- 2006–2008: Al-Hilal
Medal record
Men's Football
Representing Brazil
Pan American Games
| Gold medal – first place | 1963 São Paulo |
- * Club domestic league appearances and goals

Othon Valentim Filho (20 December 1944 – 22 May 2024) was a Brazilian football player and manager.

== International career ==
Othon was part of thef the Brazil national team that competed in the 1963 Pan American Games, where the team won the gold medal. and of in the 1964 Summer Olympics but wasn't used in the tournament on the field.

== Death ==
Othon died in his hometown, Leopoldina, on 22 May 2024, at the age of 79.
