= 1964 Campeonato Carioca =

Campeonato Carioca
- Season: 1964
- Champions: Fluminense
- Relegated: Olaria; São Cristóvão; Madureira; Campo Grande; Canto do Rio
- Matches played: 158
- Goals scored: 423 (2.68 per match)
- Top goalscorer: Amoroso (Fluminense) - 19 goals
- Biggest home win: São Cristóvão 6-0 Campo Grande (November 1, 1964)
- Biggest away win: Canto do Rio 0-6 Botafogo (August 23, 1964); Canto do Rio 0-6 Flamengo (October 24, 1964)
- Highest scoring: Bangu 4-3 Botafogo (October 11, 1964); Bangu 5-2 Canto do Rio (November 8, 1964); América 3-4 Bangu (November 28, 1964)

The 1964 edition of the Campeonato Carioca kicked off on July 4, 1964, and ended on December 13, 1964. It was organized by FCF (Federação Carioca de Futebol, or Carioca Football Federation). Thirteen teams participated. Fluminense won the title for the 18th time. Olaria, São Cristóvão, Madureira, Campo Grande and Canto do Rio were relegated.

== System ==
The tournament would be disputed in a double round-robin format, with the team with the most points winning the title and the five teams with the fewest points being relegated.

== Championship ==
Pos	Team	Pld	W	D	L	GF	GA	GD	Pts	Qualification or relegation
1	Fluminense	24	15	5	4	44	16	+28	35	Playoffs
2	Bangu	24	13	9	2	46	21	+25	35	Playoffs
3	Flamengo	24	15	4	5	45	19	+26	34	
4	Botafogo	24	15	4	5	45	21	+24	34	
5	América	24	12	6	6	36	24	+12	30	
6	Vasco da Gama	24	11	7	6	44	28	+16	29	
7	Bonsucesso	24	8	8	8	24	28	−4	24	
8	Portuguesa	24	8	7	9	30	25	+5	23	
9	Campo Grande	24	8	6	10	22	31	−9	22	Relegated
10	São Cristóvão	24	7	6	11	31	38	−7	20	Relegated
11	Olaria	24	4	7	13	21	39	−18	15	Relegated
12	Madureira	24	2	4	18	13	52	−39	8	Relegated
13	Canto do Rio	24	1	1	22	17	76	−59	3	Relegated

Updated to match(es) played on December 13, 1964. Source: RSSSF.com
Rules for classification: 1) points; 2) goal difference; 3) wins; 4) number of goals scored.

=== Playoffs ===
16 December 1964	Fluminense	1 – 0	Bangu	Maracanã, Rio de Janeiro
	Amoroso 54'	Report		Attendance: 64,084; Referee: Cláudio Magalhães

20 December 1964	Fluminense	3 – 1	Bangu	Maracanã, Rio de Janeiro
	Joaquinzinho 50'; Jorginho 53'; Gílson Nunes 67'	Report	Bianchini 28'	Attendance: 75,106; Referee: Frederico Lopes
