= Santo Zanin =

Brazilian footballer

Santo
Personal information
- Full name: Santo Zanin
- Date of birth: 3 June 1943 (age 83)
- Place of birth: Juqueri, Brazil
- Position: Defender

Senior career*
Years	Team	Apps	(Gls)
- Palmeiras
- América-SP
- Portuguesa Santista
- Prudentina
- Catanduvense

International career
1963	Brazil	2	(0)
Medal record
Men's Football
Representing Brazil
Pan American Games
Gold medal – first place	1963 São Paulo
- * Club domestic league appearances and goals

Santo Zanin (born 3 June 1943) is a Brazilian former footballer.

Zanin was part of the Brazil national team that competed in the 1963 Pan American Games, where the team won the gold medal.

== Honours ==
Palmeiras

- Torneio Rio-São Paulo: 1965

Brazil Olympic

- Pan American Games: 1963
