= 1965 Campeonato Carioca =

Campeonato Carioca
- Season: 1965
- Champions: Flamengo
- Taça Brasil: Vasco da Gama
- Matches: 56
- Goals: 149 (2.66 per match)
- Top goalscorer: Amoroso (Fluminense) - 10 goals
- Biggest home win: Fluminense 5-0 Portuguesa (December 7, 1965)
- Biggest away win: Bonsucesso 0-4 Bangu (September 19, 1965); Portuguesa 1-5 Bangu (November 28, 1965)
- Highest scoring: Fluminense 5-3 América (October 10, 1965)

The 1965 edition of the Campeonato Carioca kicked off on September 11, 1965 and ended on December 19, 1965. It was organized by FCF (Federação Carioca de Futebol, or Carioca Football Federation). Eight teams participated. Flamengo won the title for the 15th time. no teams were relegated.

== System ==
The tournament would be disputed in a double round-robin format, with the team with the most points winning the title and the team with the fewest points being relegated. However, before the 1966 championship started, the championship was expanded back to 12 teams, and as such the relegations were cancelled.

== Championship ==
Pos	Team	Pld	W	D	L	GF	GA	GD	Pts	Qualification or relegation
1	Flamengo	14	10	2	2	18	8	+10	22	Champions
2	Bangu	14	8	4	2	26	9	+17	20	
3	Fluminense	14	7	3	4	24	15	+9	17	
4	Botafogo	14	6	5	3	18	16	+2	17	
5	Vasco da Gama	14	7	1	6	24	17	+7	15	
6	Bonsucesso	14	3	3	8	10	25	−15	9	
7	América	14	1	5	8	19	29	−10	7	
8	Portuguesa	14	1	3	10	10	30	−20	5	Relegated

Updated to match(es) played on December 19, 1965. Source: RSSSF.com
Rules for classification: 1) points; 2) goal difference; 3) wins; 4) number of goals scored.

== Second Level ==
Pos	Team	Pld	W	D	L	GF	GA	GD	Pts	Qualification or relegation
1	São Cristóvão	6	5	1	0	13	6	+7	11	Promoted
2	Olaria	6	4	1	1	19	6	+13	9	
3	Madureira	6	1	0	5	4	13	−9	2	
4	Campo Grande	6	1	0	5	3	14	−11	2	
5	Canto do Rio	0	0	0	0	0	0	0	0	Withdrew

Updated to match(es) played on July 4, 1965. Source: RSSSF.com
Rules for classification: 1) points; 2) goal difference; 3) goal average; 4) wins.

== Taça Guanabara ==
=== First round ===
Pos	Team	Pld	W	D	L	GF	GA	GD	Pts	Qualification or relegation
1	Botafogo	5	3	2	0	10	2	+8	8	Qualified
2	Vasco da Gama	5	3	1	1	10	5	+5	7	Qualified
3	Flamengo	5	1	3	1	4	4	0	5	Qualified
4	Fluminense	5	1	3	1	4	8	−4	5	Qualified
5	Bangu	5	1	2	2	9	8	+1	4	
6	América	5	0	1	4	1	11	−10	1	

Updated to match(es) played on August 15, 1965. Source: RSSSF.com
Rules for classification: 1) points; 2) goal difference; 3) wins; 4) number of goals scored.

=== Second round ===
Pos	Team	Pld	W	D	L	GF	GA	GD	Pts
1	Vasco da Gama	3	3	0	0	5	0	+5	6
2	Botafogo	3	2	0	1	3	2	+1	4
3	Fluminense	3	0	1	2	2	6	−4	1
4	Flamengo	3	0	1	2	2	4	−2	1

Updated to match(es) played on September 5, 1965. Source: RSSSF.com
Rules for classification: 1) points; 2) goal difference; 3) wins; 4) number of goals scored.

=== Final standings ===
Pos	Team	Pld	W	D	L	GF	GA	GD	Pts	Qualification or relegation
1	Vasco da Gama	8	6	1	1	15	5	+10	13	Champions
2	Botafogo	8	5	2	1	13	4	+9	12	
3	Flamengo	8	1	4	3	6	8	−2	6	
4	Fluminense	8	1	4	3	6	14	−8	6	

Updated to match(es) played on August 15, 1965. Source: RSSSF.com
Rules for classification: 1) points; 2) goal difference; 3) wins; 4) number of goals scored.
