= Enry Barale =

Argentine footballer

Personal information
- Full name: Enry Juan Barale
- Date of birth: 16 November 1941
- Place of birth: Jovita, Córdoba
- Date of death: 4 December 2016 (aged 75)
- Position: Defender

Senior career*
Years	Team	Apps	(Gls)
1963	Club Atlético Banfield	14	(?)
1964	Boca Juniors	2	(0)
1965–1968	Estudiantes de La Plata	103	(?)
1969	Deportivo Morón	4	(0)
- * Club domestic league appearances and goals

Enry Juan Barale (born 16 November 1941 – 4 December 2016) is an Argentine former footballer.

== Career ==
He started his professional career playing for Banfield on May 19, 1963. Boca Juniors bought his rights in 1964, but he did not have a lot of opportunities to play there. In 1965, Osvaldo Zubeldía, the new coach of Estudiantes de La Plata, convinced him to join the team. He flourished in Estudiantes, where he was a fundamental piece of the team that won the 1967 Metropolitano Championship. Unfortunately, he got seriously injured (ACL) during the 4–3 victory in the semifinal game against Platense. That injury plagued him through the rest of his career. He was able to play again in 1968, playing in only 12 games; but he retired soon after that, playing for Deportivo Morón of the Argentine second division.

He died on December 4, 2016, in the location of Haedo (Buenos Aires).
