= Néstor Manfredi =

Argentine footballer (born 1942)

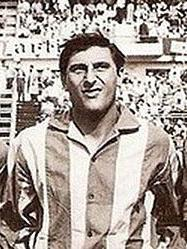

Personal information
- Date of birth: 22 August 1942 (age 84)
- Position: Forward

Senior career*
Years	Team	Apps	(Gls)
- Rosario Central
- Colón
1967	New York Generals	7	(0)
1968–1971	Los Andes		
- * Club domestic league appearances and goals

Néstor Manfredi (born 22 August 1942) is an Argentine former footballer who competed in the 1964 Summer Olympics.

== Career ==
He played one season for the New York Generals of the National Professional Soccer League. In 1968, manager Ángel Tulio Zof brought Manfredi to Club Atlético Los Andes. He spent four seasons with Los Andes, helping the club to a best-ever eighth-place finish in the 1968 Primera División.

After he retired from playing, Manfredi became a football coach. He led Gimnasia y Esgrima de Jujuy during 1999.
