= Grapete =

Brazilian footballer

Personal information
- Full name: José Borges de Couto
- Date of birth: 23 May 1943 (age 83)
- Place of birth: Silvianópolis, Brazil
- Height: 1.77 m (5 ft 10 in)
- Position: Defender

Senior career*
Years	Team	Apps	(Gls)
1964–1975	Atlético Mineiro	486	(0)
1976	América-SP		

International career
1968	Brazil	1	(0)
- * Club domestic league appearances and goals as of 12 May 2024

José Borges de Couto (born 23 May 1943), better known as Grapete, is a Brazilian former professional footballer who played as a defender.

== Career ==
Grapete played from 1964 to 1975 at Atlético Mineiro in a total of 486 appearances, marking his time and being Atlético's main defender in 1971, when they were national champions. He had this nickname because he liked the grape-flavored soft drink of the same name (Grapette). He ended his career in 1976, playing for América de Rio Preto.

Grapete played in one match for the Brazil national team, in a friendly match held in 1968 against Yuguslavia.

== Honours ==
Atlético Mineiro

- Campeonato Brasileiro: 1971
- Campeonato Mineiro: 1970
- Taça Minas Gerais: 1975
