= Zé Carlos (footballer, born 1943) =

Brazilian footballer

Personal information
- Full name: José Carlos Gaspar Ferreira
- Date of birth: 7 September 1943 (age 83)
- Place of birth: Rio de Janeiro, Brazil
- Position: Defender

Senior career*
Years	Team	Apps	(Gls)
1961–1970	Botafogo	314	(0)

International career
1963	Brazil Olympic	3	(0)
1967	Brazil	1	(0)
Medal record
Men's Football
Representing Brazil
Pan American Games
Gold medal – first place	1963 São Paulo
- * Club domestic league appearances and goals

José Carlos Gaspar Ferreira (Note: This name uses Portuguese naming customs: the first or maternal family name is Gaspar and the second or paternal family name is Ferreira.) (born 7 September 1943), known as Zé Carlos, is a Brazilian former footballer who played as a defender.

== Club career ==
Nicknamed "Canarinho", Zé Carlos played for Botafogo FR throughout the 1960s, alongside other great idols of the club such as Garrincha, Nílton Santos, Amarildo and Quarentinha.

== International career ==
Zé Carlos was part of the Brazil national team that competed in the 1963 Pan American Games, where the team won the gold medal. He also played one match for the A team on 19 September 1967, against Chile, scoring one of the goals in the match.

== Honours ==
Botafogo

- Campeonato Carioca: 1967, 1968
- Taça Brasil: 1968
- Taça Guanabara: 1967, 1968
- Torneio Rio-São Paulo: 1964, 1966
- Torneio Início Carioca: 1963, 1967
- Paramaribo Cup: 1964

Brazil Olympic

- Pan American Games: 1963
