= Brazil national football team records and statistics =

This is a list of the Brazil national football team's competitive records and statistics.

== Honours ==
=== Senior team ===
==== Major competitions ====
- FIFA World Cup
  - Winners (5): 1958, 1962, 1970, 1994, 2002
  - Runners-up (2): 1950, 1998
  - Third place (2): 1938, 1978
  - Fourth place (2): 1974, 2014
- South American Championship / Copa América
  - Winners (9): 1919, 1922, 1949, 1989, 1997, 1999, 2004, 2007, 2019
  - Runners-up (12): 1921, 1925, 1937, 1945, 1946, 1953, 1957, 1959 (Argentina), 1983, 1991, 1995, 2021
  - Third place (7): 1916, 1917, 1920, 1942, 1959 (Ecuador), 1975, 1979
  - Fourth place (3): 1923, 1956, 1963
- FIFA Confederations Cup
  - Winners (4): 1997, 2005, 2009, 2013
  - Runners-up: 1999
  - Fourth place: 2001
- Panamerican Championship
  - Winners (2): 1952, 1956
  - Runners-up: 1960
- CONCACAF Gold Cup
  - Runners-up (2): 1996, 2003
  - Third place: 1998

==== Awards ====
- FIFA Team of the Year
  - Winners (13): 1994, 1995, 1996, 1997, 1998, 1999, 2000, 2002, 2003, 2004, 2005, 2006, 2022
- World Soccer Team of the Year

- Winners (2): 1982, 2002

- FIFA World Cup Fair Play Trophy
  - Winners (4): 1982, 1986, 1994, 2006
- FIFA Confederations Cup Fair Play Trophy
  - Winners (2): 1999, 2009
- Copa América Fair Play Trophy
  - Winners (1) : 2019

==== South-American National Teams Tournaments ====
- Roca Cup / Superclásico de las Américas (vs Argentina)
  - Winners (15): 1914, 1922, 1945, 1957, 1960, 1963, 1971 2021(shared), 1976, 2011, 2012, 2014, 2018
- Copa Confraternidad (vs Argentina)
  - Winners: 1923
- Copa 50imo Aniversario de Clarín (vs Argentina)
  - Winners: 1995
- Copa Río Branco (vs Uruguay)
  - Winners (7): 1931, 1932, 1947, 1950, 1967 (shared), 1968, 1976
- Copa Rodrigues Alves (vs Paraguay)
  - Winners (2): 1922, 1923
- Taça Oswaldo Cruz (vs Paraguay)
  - Winners (8): 1950, 1955, 1956, 1958, 1961, 1962, 1968, 1976
- Copa Bernardo O'Higgins (vs Chile)
  - Winners (4): 1955, 1959, 1961, 1966 (shared)
- Copa Teixeira (vs Chile)
  - Winners: 1990 (shared)
- Taça Jorge Chavéz / Santos Dumont (vs Peru)
  - Winners: 1968

==== Friendlies ====
- Taça Interventor Federal (vs EC Bahia)
  - Winners: 1934
- Taça Dois de Julho (vs Bahia XI)
  - Winners: 1934
- Copa Emílio Garrastazú Médici (vs Mexico)
  - Winners: 1970
- Taça Independência
  - Winners: 1972
- Taça do Atlântico
  - Winners (3): 1956, 1970, 1976
- U.S.A. Bicentennial Cup Tournament
  - Winners: 1976
- Taça Centenário Jornal O Fluminense (vs Rio de Janeiro XI)
  - Winners: 1978
- Saudi Crown Prince Trophy (vs Al Ahli Saudi FC)
  - Winners: 1978
- Rous Cup
  - Winners: 1987
- Australia Bicentenary Gold Cup
  - Winners: 1988
- Amistad Cup
  - Winners: 1992
- Umbro Cup
  - Winners: 1995
- Nelson Mandela Challenge
  - Winners: 1996
- Lunar New Year Cup
  - Winners: 2005
- Kirin Challenge Cup
  - Winners: 2022

=== Olympic and Pan American Team ===
- Summer Olympics
  - (gold) Gold medalists (2): 2016, 2020
  - (silver) Silver medalists (3): 1984, 1988, 2012
  - (bronze) Bronze medalists (2): 1996, 2008
  - Fourth place: 1976
- Pan American Games
  - (gold) Gold medalists (5): 1963, 1975 (shared), 1979, 1987, 2023
  - (silver) Silver medalists (3): 1959, 1983, 2003
  - (bronze) Bronze medalists (1): 2015
- CONMEBOL Pre-Olympic Tournament
  - Winners (7): 1968, 1971, 1976, 1984, 1987, 1996, 2000
  - Runners-up (2): 1964, 2020
  - Third place (2): 1960, 2004

== Individual records ==
As of 25 September 2026.
Players in bold are still active with Brazil.

=== Most appearances ===
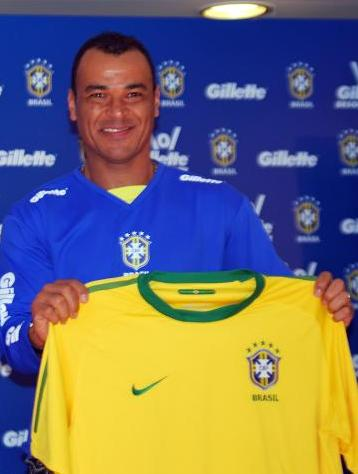
Cafu is the all-time most capped player for Brazil with 142 appearances.

Rank	Player	Caps	Goals	Career
1	Cafu	142	5	1990–2006
2	Neymar	130	80	2010–2026
3	Dani Alves	126	8	2006–2022
4	Roberto Carlos	125	10	1992–2006
5	Thiago Silva	113	7	2008–2022
6	**Marquinhos**	111	7	2013–present
7	Lúcio	105	4	2000–2011
8	Cláudio Taffarel	101	0	1988–1998
9	Robinho	100	28	2003–2017
10	Ronaldo	98	62	1994–2011
10	Djalma Santos	98	3	1952–1968

=== Top goalscorers ===
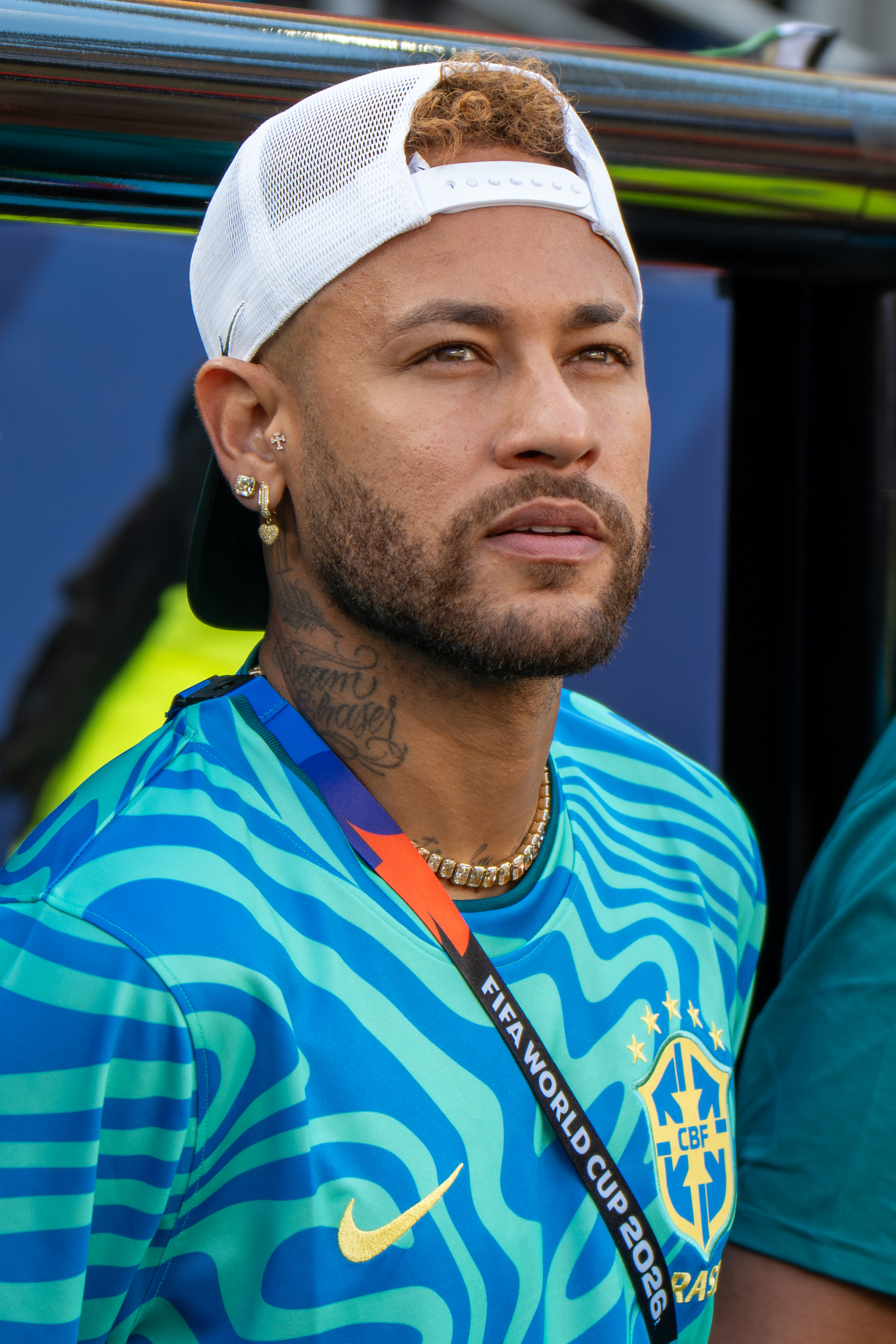
Neymar is Brazil's all-time top scorer with 80 goals.

Rank	Player	Goals	Caps	Average	Career
1	Neymar	80	130	0.62	2010–2026
2	Pelé (Note: This includes a match for Brazil against the rest of the world, which FIFA does not recognise, played for the 10th anniversary of their first World Cup title)	77	92	0.84	1957–1971
3	Ronaldo	62	98	0.63	1994–2011
4	Romário (Note: Some sources, including FIFA, credit Romário with an extra goal in a 3–2 win against Mexico in the 1997 Copa América while other sources give it as an own goal to Camilo Romero. It is not counted here.)	55	70	0.79	1987–2005
5	Zico	48	71	0.68	1976–1986
6	Bebeto	38	75	0.51	1985–1998
7	Rivaldo	35	74	0.47	1993–2003
8	Jairzinho	33	81	0.41	1964–1982
8	Ronaldinho	33	97	0.34	1999–2013
10	Ademir	32	39	0.82	1945–1953
10	Tostão	32	54	0.59	1966–1972

=== Other records ===
Youngest goalscorer

- Pelé (16 years and nine months) vs. Argentina, 7 July 1957

Oldest goalscorer

- Romário (39 years and two months) vs. Guatemala, 27 April 2005

Most goals scored in a single match

- Evaristo (5 goals) vs. Colombia, 24 March 1957

First goal scored

- Oswaldo Gomes vs. (England) Exeter City FC, 21 July 1914 (unofficial game)
- Rubens Salles vs. Argentina, 27 September 1914 (official game)

Most clean sheets

- Cláudio Taffarel (52 matches)

Most matches as a captain

- Cafu (66 matches)

Most yellow cards received

- Neymar (33 yellow cards)

Most red cards received

- Dunga and Éder Aleixo (3 red cards each)

== Manager records ==
=== Most manager appearances ===
As of 9 December 2022
Includes only official matches. In bold the current manager.

Rank	Manager	Apps	W	D	L	%
1	Mário Zagallo	126	90	26	10	80,31
2	Carlos Alberto Parreira	112	61	37	14	67,87
3	Dunga	83	57	17	9	75,50
4	Tite	81	60	15	6	80,24
5	Aymoré Moreira	63	39	9	16	64,46
6	Vicente Feola	57	41	10	6	80,70
7	Flávio Costa	56	35	9	12	70,54
8	Luiz Felipe Scolari	53	37	7	9	74,21
8	Telê Santana	53	38	10	5	81,13

=== Managers at the FIFA World Cup ===
In **bold**, edition champions

Edition	Manager
(Uruguay) 1930	Píndaro de Carvalho
(Italy) 1934	Luiz Vinhaes
(France) 1938	Adhemar Pimenta
(Brazil) 1950	Flávio Costa
(Switzerland) 1954	Zezé Moreira
(Sweden) 1958	**Vicente Feola**
(Chile) 1962	**Aymoré Moreira**
(England) 1966	Vicente Feola
(Mexico) 1970	**Mário Zagallo**
(West Germany) 1974	Mário Zagallo
(Argentina) 1978	Cláudio Coutinho
(Spain) 1982	Telê Santana
(Mexico) 1986	Telê Santana
(Italy) 1990	Sebastião Lazaroni
(United States) 1994	**Carlos Alberto Parreira**
(France) 1998	Mário Zagallo
(South Korea) (Japan) 2002	**Luiz Felipe Scolari**
(Germany) 2006	Carlos Alberto Parreira
(South Africa) 2010	Dunga
(Brazil) 2014	Luiz Felipe Scolari
(Russia) 2018	Tite
(Qatar) 2022	Tite
(Canada) (Mexico) (United States) 2026	Carlo Ancelotti

=== Managers at the South American Championship and Copa América ===
In **bold**, edition champions

Edition	Manager
1916 to 1920	Ground committeé
(Argentina) 1921	Ferreira Vianna Netto
(Brazil) 1922	Ground committeé
(Uruguay) 1923	Chico Netto
(Argentina) 1925	Joaquim Guimarães (Uruguay) Ramón Platero
(Argentina) 1937	Adhemar Pimenta
(Argentina) 1942	Adhemar Pimenta
(Chile) 1945	Flávio Costa
(Argentina) 1946	Flávio Costa
(Brazil) 1949	**Flávio Costa**
(Peru) 1953	Aymoré Moreira
(Uruguay) 1956	Osvaldo Brandão
(Peru) 1957	Osvaldo Brandão
(Argentina) 1959	Vicente Feola
(Ecuador) 1959	Gentil Cardoso
(Bolivia) 1963	Aymoré Moreira
1975	Osvaldo Brandão
1979	Claudio Coutinho
1983	Carlos Alberto Parreira
(Argentina) 1987	Carlos Alberto Silva
(Brazil) 1989	**Sebastião Lazaroni**
(Chile) 1991	Paulo Roberto Falcão
(Ecuador) 1993	Carlos Alberto Parreira
(Uruguay) 1995	Mário Zagallo
(Bolivia) 1997	**Mário Zagallo**
(Paraguay) 1999	**Vanderlei Luxemburgo**
(Colombia) 2001	Luiz Felipe Scolari
(Peru) 2004	**Carlos Alberto Parreira**
(Venezuela) 2007	**Dunga**
(Argentina) 2011	Mano Menezes
(Chile) 2015	Dunga
(United States) 2016	Dunga
(Brazil) 2019	**Tite**
(Brazil) 2021	Tite
(United States) 2024	Dorival Júnior

=== Managers at the FIFA Confederations Cup ===
In **bold**, edition champions

Edition	Manager
(Saudi Arabia) 1997	**Mário Zagallo**
(Mexico) 1999	Vanderlei Luxemburgo
(South Korea) (Japan) 2001	Emerson Leão
(France) 2003	Carlos Alberto Parreira
(Germany) 2005	**Carlos Alberto Parreira**
(South Africa) 2009	**Dunga**
(Brazil) 2013	**Luiz Felipe Scolari**

=== Managers at the Panamerican Championship ===
In **bold**, edition champions

Edition	Manager
(Chile) 1952	**Zezé Moreira**
(Mexico) 1956	**Teté**
(Costa Rica) 1960	Foguinho

=== Managers at the CONCACAF Gold Cup ===
In **bold**, edition champions

Edition	Manager
(United States) 1996	Mário Zagallo
(United States) 1998	Mário Zagallo
(United States) (Mexico) 2003	Ricardo Gomes

=== Managers at the Olympic Games ===
In **bold**, edition champions

Edition	Manager
(Finland) 1952	Newton Cardoso
(Italy) 1960	Vicente Feola
(Japan) 1964	Vicente Feola
(Mexico) 1968	Celso Marão
(West Germany) 1972	Antoninho
(Canada) 1976	Zizinho
(United States) 1984	Jair Picerni
(South Korea) 1988	Carlos Alberto Silva
(United States) 1996	Mário Zagallo
(Australia) 2000	Vanderlei Luxemburgo
(China) 2008	Dunga
(United Kingdom) 2012	Mano Menezes
(Brazil) 2016	**Rogério Micale**
(Japan) 2020	**André Jardine**

=== Managers at the Pan American Games ===
In **bold**, edition champions

Edition	Manager
(United States) 1959	Newton Cardoso
(Brazil) 1963	**Antoninho**
(Mexico) 1975	**Zizinho**
(Puerto Rico) 1979	**Mário Travaglini**
(Venezuela) 1983	Gílson Nunes
(United States) 1987	**Carlos Alberto Silva**
(Argentina) 1995	Pupo Gimenez
(Dominican Republic) 2003	Valinhos
(Brazil) 2007	Lucho Nizzo
(Mexico) 2011	Ney Franco
(Canada) 2015	Rogério Micale
(Chile) 2023	**Ramon Menezes**

== Team records ==
Biggest victories

10–1 vs. Bolivia, 10 April 1949
9–0 vs. Colombia, 24 March 1957
9–1 vs. Ecuador, 3 April 1949
8–0 vs. Bolivia, 14 July 1977
8–0 vs. United Arab Emirates, 12 November 2005
8–0 vs. China, 10 September 2012
9–2 vs. Ecuador, 21 February 1945
8–1 vs. Bolivia, 1 March 1953
7–0 vs. Paraguay, 11 May 1949
7–0 vs. Chile, 17 September 1959
7–0 vs. Republic of Ireland, 27 May 1982
7–0 vs. Peru, 25 July 1997
7–0 vs. Venezuela, 30 June 1999
7–0 vs. Thailand, 23 February 2000
7–0 vs. Honduras, 9 June 2019

Most consecutive matches undefeated
35 (1993–1996) (shared with Spain between 2007–2009)

Most consecutives wins
14 (1997)

=== FIFA World Ranking history ===
1993	1994	1995	1996	1997	1998	1999	2000	2001	2002	2003	2004	2005	2006	2007	2008	2009	2010	2011	2012	2013	2014	2015	2016	2017	2018	2019	2020	2021	2022	2023	2024	2025	2026
3	1	1	1	1	1	1	1	3	1	1	1	1	1	2	5	2	4	6	18	22	6	6	2	2	3	3	3	2	1	5	5	5	

Performance summary

First place
12 times (1994, 1995, 1996, 1997, 1998, 1999, 2000, 2002, 2003, 2004, 2005, 2006, 2022)
Second place
5 times (2007, 2009, 2016, 2017, 2021)
Third place
5 times (1993, 2001, 2018, 2019, 2020)
CONMEBOL best placed team
20 times (1993, 1994, 1995, 1996, 1997, 1998, 1999, 2000, 2002, 2004, 2005, 2006, 2008, 2009, 2010, 2017, 2018, 2019, 2020, 2021, 2022)
Top 3
23 of 33
Top 10
31 of 33

=== World Football Elo Ratings history ===
1914	1915	1916	1917	1918	1919	1920	1921	1922	1923	1924	1925	1926	1927	1928	1929	1930	1931	1932	1933	1934	1935	1936	1937	1938	1939	1940	1941	1942	1943	1944	1945	1946	1947	1948	1949	1950
7	7	7	9	9	7	11	12	6	8	7	5	5	5	6	5	9	8	6	6	10	11	10	7	7	6	9	9	9	9	8	3	3	4	5	4	2
1951	1952	1953	1954	1955	1956	1957	1958	1959	1960	1961	1962	1963	1964	1965	1966	1967	1968	1969	1970	1971	1972	1973	1974	1975	1976	1977	1978	1979	1980	1981	1982	1983	1984	1985	1986	1987
2	3	4	4	3	3	4	1	1	1	1	1	4	4	1	8	8	3	2	1	1	2	1	3	4	2	3	1	2	2	2	1	4	5	5	2	5
1988	1989	1990	1991	1992	1993	1994	1995	1996	1997	1998	1999	2000	2001	2002	2003	2004	2005	2006	2007	2008	2009	2010	2011	2012	2013	2014	2015	2016	2017	2018	2019	2020	2021	2022	2023	2024
2	2	5	7	2	4	1	1	2	1	2	1	2	18	1	5	5	1	1	1	3	1	3	4	2	1	3	2	1	1	1	2	1	1	2	6	5
2025	2026																																			
6

Performance summary

First place
26 times (1958, 1959, 1960, 1961, 1962, 1965, 1970, 1971, 1973, 1978, 1982, 1994, 1995, 1997, 1999, 2002, 2005, 2006, 2007, 2009, 2013, 2016, 2017, 2018, 2020, 2021)
Second place
19 times (1950, 1951, 1969, 1972, 1976, 1979, 1980, 1981, 1986, 1988, 1989, 1992, 1996, 1998, 2000, 2012, 2015, 2019, 2022)
Third place
11 times (1945, 1946, 1952, 1955, 1956, 1968, 1974, 1977, 2008, 2010, 2014)
Top 3
56 of 112
Top 10
108 of 112

== Competition records ==
=== FIFA World Cup ===
FIFA World Cup record										Qualification record					
Year	Round	Position	Pld	W	D*	L	GF	GA	Squad	Pld	W	D	L	GF	GA
(Uruguay) 1930	Group stage	6th	2	1	0	1	5	2	Squad	Qualified as invitees					
(Italy) 1934	Round of 16	14th	1	0	0	1	1	3	Squad	Qualified automatically					
(France) 1938	Third place	3rd	5	3	1	1	14	11	Squad	Qualified automatically					
(Brazil) 1950	Runners-up	2nd	6	4	1	1	22	6	Squad	Qualified as hosts					
(Switzerland) 1954	Quarter-finals	5th	3	1	1	1	8	5	Squad	4	4	0	0	8	1
(Sweden) 1958	Champions	1st	6	5	1	0	16	4	Squad	2	1	1	0	2	1
(Chile) 1962	Champions	1st	6	5	1	0	14	5	Squad	Qualified as defending champions					
(England) 1966	Group stage	11th	3	1	0	2	4	6	Squad	Qualified as defending champions					
(Mexico) 1970	Champions	1st	6	6	0	0	19	7	Squad	6	6	0	0	23	2
(West Germany) 1974	Fourth place	4th	7	3	2	2	6	4	Squad	Qualified as defending champions					
(Argentina) 1978	Third place	3rd	7	4	3	0	10	3	Squad	6	4	2	0	17	1
(Spain) 1982	Second round	5th	5	4	0	1	15	6	Squad	4	4	0	0	11	2
(Mexico) 1986	Quarter-finals	5th	5	4	1	0	10	1	Squad	4	2	2	0	6	2
(Italy) 1990	Round of 16	9th	4	3	0	1	4	2	Squad	4	3	1	0	13	1
(United States) 1994	Champions	1st	7	5	2	0	11	3	Squad	8	5	2	1	20	4
(France) 1998	Runners-up	2nd	7	4	1	2	14	10	Squad	Qualified as defending champions					
(South Korea) (Japan) 2002	Champions	1st	7	7	0	0	18	4	Squad	18	9	3	6	31	17
(Germany) 2006	Quarter-finals	5th	5	4	0	1	10	2	Squad	18	9	7	2	35	17
(South Africa) 2010	Quarter-finals	6th	5	3	1	1	9	4	Squad	18	9	7	2	33	11
(Brazil) 2014	Fourth place	4th	7	3	2	2	11	14	Squad	Qualified as hosts					
(Russia) 2018	Quarter-finals	6th	5	3	1	1	8	3	Squad	18	12	5	1	41	11
(Qatar) 2022	Quarter-finals	7th	5	3	1	1	8	3	Squad	17	14	3	0	40	5
(Canada) (Mexico) (United States) 2026	Round of 16	11th	5	3	1	1	10	4	Squad	18	8	4	6	24	17
Total	5 Titles	23/23	119	79	20	20	247	112	—	145	90	37	18	304	92

*Denotes draws include knockout matches decided via penalty shoot-out.
**Gold background colour indicates that the tournament was won. Red border colour indicates tournament was held on home soil.
***Right arrow (→) means an actual tournament status.

=== FIFA Confederations Cup ===
FIFA Confederations Cup record										Qualification
Year	Round	Position	Pld	W	D*	L	GF	GA	Squad	Qualification
(Saudi Arabia) 1992	Did not qualify									1991 Copa América runners-up
(Saudi Arabia) 1995	Did not qualify									1993 Copa América quarter-finalists
(Saudi Arabia) 1997	Champions	1st	5	4	1	0	14	2	Squad	1994 FIFA World Cup winners
(Mexico) 1999	Runners-up	2nd	5	4	0	1	18	6	Squad	1998 FIFA World Cup runners-up (Note: Brazil qualified as 1997 Copa América winners but was moved through the World Cup berth after France (the 1998 FIFA World Cup winner) declined to take part on the tournament.)
(South Korea) (Japan) 2001	Fourth place	4th	5	1	2	2	3	3	Squad	1999 Copa América winners
(France) 2003	Group stage	5th	3	1	1	1	3	3	Squad	2002 FIFA World Cup winners
(Germany) 2005	Champions	1st	5	3	1	1	12	6	Squad	2002 FIFA World Cup winners (Note: Brazil had won both the 2002 FIFA World Cup and the 2004 Copa América. They were allocated the World Cup berth.)
(South Africa) 2009	Champions	1st	5	5	0	0	14	5	Squad	2007 Copa América winners
(Brazil) 2013	Champions	1st	5	5	0	0	14	3	Squad	Qualified as hosts
(Russia) 2017	Did not qualify									2014 FIFA World Cup fourth place and 2015 Copa América quarter-finalists
Total	4 Titles	7/10	33	23	5	5	78	28	—	

*Denotes draws include knockout matches decided via penalty shoot-out.
**Gold background colour indicates that the tournament was won. Red border colour indicates tournament was held on home soil.
***Right arrow (→) means an actual tournament status.

=== Copa América and South American Championship ===
From 1916 to 1967 the tournament was called South American Football Championship and was played in a single group with teams playing each other. Extra matches were played if two teams finish tied in points as top of the group. The competition was renamed Copa América from 1975 onwards and the format changed to a group stage and a knockout stage tournament.

South American Championship record
Year	Round	Position	Pld	W	D*	L	GF	GA	Squad
(Argentina) 1916	Third place	3rd	3	0	2	1	3	4	Squad
(Uruguay) 1917	Third place	3rd	3	1	0	2	7	8	Squad
(Brazil) 1919	Champions	1st	4	3	1	0	12	3	Squad
(Chile) 1920	Third place	3rd	3	1	0	2	1	8	Squad
(Argentina) 1921	Runners-up	2nd	3	1	0	2	4	3	Squad
(Brazil) 1922	Champions	1st	5	2	3	0	7	2	Squad
(Uruguay) 1923	Fourth place	4th	3	0	0	3	2	5	Squad
(Uruguay) 1924	Withdrew								
(Argentina) 1925	Runners-up	2nd	4	2	1	1	11	9	Squad
(Chile) 1926	Withdrew								
(Peru) 1927	Withdrew								
(Argentina) 1929	Withdrew								
(Peru) 1935	Withdrew								
(Argentina) 1937	Runners-up	2nd	6	4	0	2	17	11	Squad
(Peru) 1939	Withdrew								
(Chile) 1941	Withdrew								
(Uruguay) 1942	Third place	3rd	6	3	1	2	15	7	Squad
(Chile) 1945	Runners-up	2nd	6	5	0	1	19	5	Squad
(Argentina) 1946	Runners-up	2nd	5	3	1	1	13	7	Squad
(Ecuador) 1947	Withdrew								
(Brazil) 1949	Champions	1st	8	7	0	1	46	7	Squad
(Peru) 1953	Runners-up	2nd	7	4	0	3	17	9	Squad
(Chile) 1955	Withdrew								
(Uruguay) 1956	Fourth place	4th	5	2	2	1	4	5	Squad
(Peru) 1957	Runners-up	2nd	6	4	0	2	23	9	Squad
(Argentina) 1959	Runners-up	2nd	6	4	2	0	17	7	Squad
(Ecuador) 1959	Third place	3rd	4	2	0	2	7	10	Squad
(Bolivia) 1963	Fourth place	4th	6	2	1	3	12	13	Squad
(Uruguay) 1967	Withdrew								
Total	3 Titles	19/29	93	50	14	29	237	132	—

*Denotes draws include knockout matches decided via penalty shoot-out.
**Gold background colour indicates that the tournament was won.
***Red border colour indicates tournament was held on home soil.

Copa América record
Year	Round	Position	Pld	W	D*	L	GF	GA	Squad
1975	Semi-final	3rd	6	5	0	1	16	4	Squad
1979	Semi-final	3rd	6	2	2	2	10	9	Squad
1983	Runners-up	2nd	8	2	4	2	8	5	Squad
(Argentina) 1987	Group stage	5th	2	1	0	1	5	4	Squad
(Brazil) 1989	Champions	1st	7	5	2	0	11	1	Squad
(Chile) 1991	Runners-up	2nd	7	4	1	2	12	8	Squad
(Ecuador) 1993	Quarter-finals	5th	4	1	2	1	6	4	Squad
(Uruguay) 1995	Runners-up	2nd	6	4	2	0	10	3	Squad
(Bolivia) 1997	Champions	1st	6	6	0	0	22	3	Squad
(Paraguay) 1999	Champions	1st	6	6	0	0	17	2	Squad
(Colombia) 2001	Quarter-finals	6th	4	2	0	2	5	4	Squad
(Peru) 2004	Champions	1st	6	3	2	1	13	6	Squad
(Venezuela) 2007	Champions	1st	6	4	1	1	15	5	Squad
(Argentina) 2011	Quarter-finals	8th	4	1	3	0	6	4	Squad
(Chile) 2015	Quarter-finals	5th	4	2	1	1	5	4	Squad
(United States) 2016	Group stage	9th	3	1	1	1	7	2	Squad
(Brazil) 2019	Champions	1st	6	4	2	0	13	1	Squad
(Brazil) 2021	Runners-up	2nd	7	5	1	1	12	3	Squad
(United States) 2024	Quarter-finals	7th	4	1	3	0	5	2	Squad
Total	6 Titles	19/19	102	59	27	16	198	74	—

=== Panamerican Championship ===
The Panamerican Championship was an international football tournament held by the Panamerican Football Confederation every four years from 1952 through 1960. Since the Americas' premier tournament, Copa América, was restricted to South American teams, the Panamerican Championship was an attempt to create an Americas-wide championship.

Panamerican Championship record
Year	Round	Position	Pld	W	D*	L	GF	GA
(Chile) 1952	Champions	1st	5	4	1	0	14	2
(Mexico) 1956	Champions	1st	5	4	1	0	14	5
(Costa Rica) 1960	Runners-up	2nd	6	3	1	2	10	8
Total	2 Titles	3/3	16	11	3	2	38	15

*Denotes draws include knockout matches decided via penalty shoot-out.
**Gold background colour indicates that the tournament was won. Red border colour indicates tournament was held on home soil.
***Right arrow (→) means an actual tournament status.

=== CONCACAF Gold Cup ===
Brazil has been invited to participate in three editions of the CONCACAF Gold Cup.

CONCACAF Gold Cup record
Year	Round	Position	Pld	W	D*	L	GF	GA	Squad
(United States) 1996	Runners-up	2nd	4	3	0	1	10	3	Squad
(United States) 1998	Third Place	3rd	5	2	2	1	6	2	Squad
(United States) (Mexico) 2003	Runners-up	2nd	5	3	0	2	6	4	Squad
Total	2 Runners-up	3 Tournaments	14	8	2	4	22	9	—

*Denotes draws include knockout matches decided via penalty shoot-out.
**Gold background colour indicates that the tournament was won. Red border colour indicates tournament was held on home soil.
***Right arrow (→) means an actual tournament status.

=== Olympic Games ===
Football at the Summer Olympics has been an under-23 tournament since 1992.

Summer Olympics record										Olympics Qualification record					
Year	Round	Position	Pld	W	D*	L	GF	GA	Squad	Pld	W	D*	L	GF	GA
(France) Paris 1900	Did not participate									No qualification held					
(United States) Saint Louis 1904	Did not participate									No qualification held					
(United Kingdom) London 1908	Did not participate									No qualification held					
(Sweden) Stockholm 1912	Did not participate									No qualification held					
(Belgium) Antwerp 1920	Did not participate									No qualification held					
(France) Paris 1924	Did not qualify									1923 South American Championship fourth place					
(Netherlands) Amsterdam 1928	Did not qualify									1927 South American Championship did not participate					
(Nazi Germany) Berlin 1936	Did not qualify									1935 South American Championship did not participate					
(United Kingdom) London 1948	Did not participate									No qualification held					
(Finland) Helsinki 1952	Quarter-finals	5th	3	2	0	1	9	6	Squad	No qualification held					
(Australia) Melbourne 1956	Did not participate									No qualification held					
(Italy) Rome 1960	Group stage	6th	3	2	0	1	10	6	Squad	6	3	0	3	14	10
(Japan) Tokyo 1964	Group stage	9th	3	1	1	1	5	2	Squad	4	3	1	0	10	2
Mexico City 1968	Group stage	13th	3	0	2	1	4	5	Squad	6	3	2	1	9	2
(West Germany) Munich 1972	Group stage	13th	3	0	1	2	4	6	Squad	7	4	3	0	7	3
(Canada) Montreal 1976	Fourth place	4th	5	2	1	2	6	6	Squad	5	4	1	0	12	2
(Soviet Union) Moscow 1980	Did not qualify									6	2	1	3	8	12
(United States) Los Angeles 1984	Silver Medal	2nd	6	4	1	1	9	5	Squad	5	4	1	0	9	3
(South Korea) Seoul 1988	Silver Medal	2nd	6	4	1	1	12	4	Squad	7	3	2	2	9	9
(Spain) Barcelona 1992	Did not qualify									4	2	1	1	4	4
(United States) Atlanta 1996	Bronze Medal	3rd	6	4	0	2	16	8	Squad	7	5	2	0	21	6
(Australia) Sydney 2000	Quarter-finals	7th	4	2	0	2	6	6	Squad	7	5	2	0	24	6
(Greece) Athens 2004	Did not qualify									7	3	2	2	12	5
(China) Beijing 2008	Bronze Medal	3rd	6	5	0	1	14	3	Squad	Qualified as 2007 South American U-20 Championship winners					
(United Kingdom) London 2012	Silver Medal	2nd	6	5	0	1	16	7	Squad	Qualified as 2011 South American U-20 Championship winners					
(Brazil) Rio de Janeiro 2016	Gold Medal	1st	6	3	3	0	13	1	Squad	Qualified as hosts					
(Japan) Tokyo 2020	Gold Medal	1st	6	4	2	0	10	4	Squad	7	5	2	0	16	7
(France) Paris 2024	Did not qualify									7	4	0	3	8	7
Total	2–3–2	14/28	66	38	12	16	134	69	—	85 (Note: Only matches from specific Olympic qualifying tournaments are considered.)	50	20	15	163	78

*Denotes draws include knockout matches decided via penalty shoot-out.
**Gold background colour indicates that the tournament was won. Red border colour indicates tournament was held on home soil.
***Right arrow (→) means an actual tournament status.

=== Pan American Games record ===
Pan American Games record
Year	Round	Position	Pld	W	D*	L	GF	GA	Squad
(Argentina) Buenos Aires 1951	Did not enter								
Mexico City 1955	Did not enter								
(United States) Chicago 1959	Silver Medal	2nd	6	4	1	1	27	11	Squad
(Brazil) São Paulo 1963	Gold Medal	1st	4	3	1	0	18	3	Squad
(Canada) Winnipeg 1967	Did not enter								
(Colombia) Cali 1971	Did not enter								
Mexico City 1975	Gold Medal	1st	7	5	2	0	33	2	Squad
(Puerto Rico) San Juan 1979	Gold Medal	1st	5	5	0	0	14	1	Squad
(Venezuela) Caracas 1983	Silver Medal	2nd	3	2	0	1	3	1	Squad
(United States) Indianapolis 1987	Gold Medal	1st	5	4	1	0	10	2	Squad
(Cuba) Havana 1991	Did not enter								
(Argentina) Mar del Plata 1995	Quarter-finals	5th	4	2	2	0	5	2	Squad
(Canada) Winnipeg 1999	Did not enter								
(Dominican Republic) Santo Domingo 2003	Silver Medal	2nd	5	4	0	1	12	2	Squad
(Brazil) Rio de Janeiro 2007	Group stage	5th	3	2	0	1	7	4	Squad
(Mexico) Guadalajara 2011	Group stage	6th	3	0	2	1	2	4	Squad
(Canada) Toronto 2015	Bronze Medal	3rd	5	3	1	1	15	7	Squad
(Peru) Lima 2019	Did not qualify								
(Chile) Santiago 2023	Gold Medal	1st	5	4	1	0	8	1	Squad
Total	5–3–1	12/19	55	38	11	6	154	40	—

*Denotes draws include knockout matches decided via penalty shoot-out.
**Gold background colour indicates that the tournament was won. Red border colour indicates tournament was held on home soil.
***Right arrow (→) means an actual tournament status.

== Head-to-head record ==
Below is a result summary of all matches Brazil have played against FIFA recognized teams.

Updated on 17 November 2026, after the match against Singapore.

Positive Record Neutral Record Negative Record

Opponent	Pld	W	D	L	GF	GA	GD	Win %
Algeria	4	4	0	0	8	0	+8	100.00%
Andorra	1	1	0	0	3	0	+3	100.00%
Argentina (Note: AFA and CBF differ from the total match count. Here, it shows only the numbers according to CBF. For more information, visit the article Argentina–Brazil football rivalry)	111	43	26	42	167	167	0	38.94%
Australia	11	8	2	1	30	6	+24	72.73%
Austria	10	7	3	0	17	5	+12	70.00%
Belgium	5	3	0	2	11	8	+3	60.00%
Bolivia	34	24	4	6	113	27	+86	70.59%
Bosnia and Herzegovina	2	2	0	0	3	1	+2	100.00%
Bulgaria	9	8	1	0	19	2	+17	88.89%
Cameroon	7	5	0	2	12	3	+9	71.43%
Canada	4	2	2	0	8	4	+4	50.00%
Chile	77	55	14	8	175	62	+113	71.42%
China	3	2	1	0	12	0	+12	66.67%
Colombia	38	22	12	4	71	22	+49	57.89%
Costa Rica	12	10	1	1	34	9	+25	86.11%
Croatia	6	4	2	0	11	4	+7	66.67%
Czech Republic (Note: Includes matches against Czechoslovakia)	19	11	6	2	32	15	+17	57.89%
Denmark	3	2	0	1	6	7	−1	66.67%
DR Congo (Note: Includes matches against Zaire)	1	1	0	0	3	0	+3	100.00%
East Germany	4	3	1	0	10	4	+6	75.00%
Ecuador	37	28	7	2	99	24	+75	75.68%
Egypt (Note: Includes matches against the United Arab Republic)	7	7	0	0	20	5	+15	100.00%
El Salvador	3	3	0	0	13	0	+13	100.00%
England	27	12	11	4	35	23	+12	44.44%
Estonia	1	1	0	0	1	0	+1	100.00%
Finland	3	3	0	0	9	3	+6	100.00%
France	17	7	4	6	28	22	+6	41.18%
Gabon	1	1	0	0	2	0	+2	100.00%
Germany (Note: Includes matches against West Germany)	23	13	5	5	41	31	+10	56.52%
Ghana	5	5	0	0	16	2	+14	100.00%
Greece	2	1	1	0	3	0	+3	50.00%
Guatemala	2	1	1	0	4	1	+3	50.00%
Guinea	1	1	0	0	4	1	+3	100.00%
Haiti	4	4	0	0	20	1	+19	100.00%
Honduras	8	6	1	1	29	6	+23	75.00%
Hong Kong	1	1	0	0	7	1	+6	100.00%
Hungary	6	2	1	3	12	14	−2	33.33%
Iceland	2	2	0	0	9	1	+8	100.00%
India	1	1	0	0	4	0	+4	100.00%
Iran	1	1	0	0	3	0	+3	100.00%
Iraq	1	1	0	0	6	0	+6	100.00%
Israel	3	3	0	0	11	1	+10	100.00%
Italy	16	8	3	5	30	23	+7	50.00%
Ivory Coast	1	1	0	0	3	1	+2	100.00%
Jamaica	3	2	1	0	2	0	+2	66.67%
Japan	16	12	2	2	41	12	+29	75.00%
Latvia	1	1	0	0	3	0	+3	100.00%
Lithuania	1	1	0	0	3	1	+2	100.00%
Malaysia	1	1	0	0	4	0	+4	100.00%
Mexico	42	25	7	10	78	38	+40	59.53%
Morocco	4	2	1	1	7	3	+4	50.00%
Netherlands	12	3	5	4	15	18	−3	25.00%
New Zealand	3	3	0	0	10	0	+10	100.00%
Nigeria	2	1	1	0	4	1	+3	50.00%
Northern Ireland	1	1	0	0	3	0	+3	100.00%
North Korea	1	1	0	0	2	1	+1	100.00%
Norway	5	0	2	3	6	10	−4	0.00%
Oman	1	1	0	0	2	0	+2	100.00%
Panama	6	5	1	0	23	3	+20	83.33%
Paraguay	85	51	22	12	184	68	+116	60.00%
Peru	52	38	9	5	114	33	+81	73.07%
Poland	13	10	2	1	40	20	+20	76.92%
Portugal	20	13	3	4	39	16	+23	65.00%
Qatar	1	1	0	0	2	0	+2	100.00%
Republic of Ireland	7	4	1	1	12	2	+10	66.67%
Romania	5	4	1	0	9	4	+5	80.00%
Russia (Note: Includes matches against the Soviet Union)	15	9	3	3	28	13	+15	60%
Saudi Arabia	5	5	0	0	18	3	+15	100.00%
Scotland	11	9	2	0	19	3	+16	81.81%
Senegal	3	1	1	1	5	5	0	33.33%
Serbia (Note: Includes matches against Yugoslavia/Serbia and Montenegro)	21	12	7	2	41	23	+18	57.14%
Singapore	1	1	0	0	7	0	+7	100.00%
Slovakia	1	1	0	0	5	0	+5	100.00%
South Africa	5	5	0	0	12	3	+9	100.00%
South Korea	9	8	0	1	25	6	+19	88.89%
Spain	10	5	3	2	17	11	+6	50.00%
Sweden	16	10	4	2	36	18	+18	62.50%
Switzerland	10	4	4	2	12	9	+3	40.00%
Tanzania	1	1	0	0	5	1	+4	100.00%
Thailand	1	1	0	0	7	0	+7	100.00%
Tunisia	3	2	1	0	10	3	+7	66.67%
Turkey	6	4	2	0	10	3	+7	66.67%
Ukraine	1	1	0	0	2	0	+2	100.00%
United Arab Emirates	1	1	0	0	8	0	+8	100.00%
United States	20	18	1	1	42	13	+29	91.68%
Uruguay	81	38	22	21	142	100	+42	47.60%
Venezuela	30	24	5	1	98	11	+87	80.00%
Wales	10	8	1	1	20	5	+15	80.00%
Zambia	1	1	0	0	2	0	+2	100.00%
Zimbabwe	1	1	0	0	3	0	+3	100.00%
Total (90)	1,079	680	223	175	2,331	966	+1,375	63.16%

== Results by stadium ==
Following is the retrospect of Brazil national team in the main stadiums of the country:

Matches	Stadium	Location	First	Most recent	Record attendance	W-D–L	Win %
119	Maracanã	(Rio de Janeiro (state)) Rio de Janeiro, RJ	Brazil 4–0 Mexico, 24 June 1950	Brazil 0–1 Argentina, 21 November 2023	173,850 (vs. Uruguay, 16 July 1950)	85–24–10	69,5%
31	Morumbi	(São Paulo (state)) São Paulo, SP	Brazil 2–3 Argentina, 13 April 1963	Brazil 1–0 Venezuela, 13 November 2020	123,132 (vs. Austria, 1 May 1974)	20–10–1	64%
28	Pacaembu	(São Paulo (state)) São Paulo, SP	Brazil 4–0 Uruguay, 17 May 1944	Brazil 1–0 Romania, 7 June 2011	59,613 (vs. Argentina, 16 December 1945)	19–5–4	67%
26	Mineirão	(Minas Gerais) Belo Horizonte, MG	Brazil 3–0 Uruguay, 7 September 1965	Brazil 4–0 Paraguay, 1 February 2022	98,826 (vs. Poland, 5 June 1966)	18–5–3	69%
20	São Januário	(Rio de Janeiro (state)) Rio de Janeiro, RJ	Brazil 1–5 Argentina, 15 January 1939	Brazil 2–0 Paraguay, 14 July 1993	50,000 (vs. Argentina, 20 December 1945)	15–2–3	75%
16	Laranjeiras	(Rio de Janeiro (state)) Rio de Janeiro, RJ	Brazil 6–0 Chile, 11 May 1919	Brazil 2–0 Uruguay, 6 September 1931	30,000 (vs. Paraguay, 24 September 1922)	11–5–0	68%
14	Serra Dourada	(Goiás) Goiânia, GO	Brazil 6–0 Paraguay, 30 October 1980	Brazil 4–0 Panama, 3 June 2014	59,050 (vs. Paraguay, 30 October 1980)	12–2–0	85%
13	Mané Garrincha	(Federal District (Brazil)) Brasília, DF	Brazil 4–0 Haiti, 21 April 1974	Brazil 3–0 Venezuela, 13 June 2021	69,112 (vs. Cameroon, 23 June 2014)	10–1–2	76%
12	Fonte Nova	(Bahia) Salvador, BA	Brazil 1–0 Spain, 8 July 1981	Brazil 0–0 Venezuela, 18 June 2019	95,000 (vs. Uruguay, 4 November 1983)	7–5–0	58%
11	Beira-Rio	(Rio Grande do Sul) Porto Alegre, RS	Brazil 2–1 Peru, 7 April 1969	Brazil 2–0 Ecuador, 4 June 2021	68,913 (vs. Argentina, 7 September 1999)	10–0–1	90%
11	Castelão	(Ceará) Fortaleza, CE	Brazil 1–0 Uruguay, 27 August 1980	Brazil 3–1 Venezuela, 13 October 2015	118,496 (vs. Uruguay, 27 August 1980)	9–1–1	81%
9	Arruda	(Pernambuco) Recife, PE	Brazil 1–1 Switzerland, 19 May 1982	Brazil 8–0 China, 10 September 2012	101,670 (vs. Argentina, 23 March 1994)	8–1–0	88%
6	Engenhão	(Rio de Janeiro (state)) Rio de Janeiro, RJ	Brazil 0–0 Bolivia, 10 September 2008	Brazil 1–0 Peru, 5 July 2021	31,422 (vs. Bolivia, 10 September 2008)	5–1–0	83%
5	Neo Química Arena	(São Paulo (state)) São Paulo, SP	Brazil 3–1 Croatia, 12 June 2014	Brazil 1–0 Colombia, 11 November 2021	62,103 (vs. Croatia, 12 June 2014)	5–0–0	100%
5	Mangueirão	(Pará) Belém, PA	Brazil 0–0 Chile, 8 November 1990	Brazil 5–1 Bolivia, 8 September 2023	48,123 (vs. Bolivia, 8 September 2023)	4–1–0	80%
4	Castelão	(Maranhão) São Luís, MA	Brazil 3–1 Portugal, 5 May 1982	Brazil 3–0 Venezuela, 14 November 2001	70,100 (vs. FR Yugoslavia, 23 September 1998)	3–1–0	75%

== Matches in major tournaments ==
=== FIFA World Cup ===
==== Uruguay 1930 ====
Date	Stage	Venue	Opponent	Score	Brazil scorers
14 July 1930	Group 2	Estadio Gran Parque Central, Montevideo	Yugoslavia	1–2	Preguinho 62'
20 July 1930	Group 2	Estadio Centenario, Montevideo	Bolivia	4–0	Moderato 37', 73'; Preguinho 57', 83'
Second in group, eliminated

==== Italy 1934 ====
Date	Stage	Venue	Opponent	Score	Brazil scorers
27 May 1934	First round	Stadio Luigi Ferraris, Genoa	Spain	1–3	Leônidas 55'

==== France 1938 ====
Date	Stage	Venue	Opponent	Score	Brazil scorers
5 June 1938	First round	Stade de la Meinau, Strasbourg	Poland	6–5 (a.e.t.)	Leônidas 18', 93', 104'; Romeu 25'; Perácio 44', 71'
12 June 1938	Quarter-finals	Parc Lescure, Bordeaux	Czechoslovakia	1–1 (a.e.t.)	Leônidas 30'; Machado (red card) 14'; Zezé Procópio (red card) 89'
14 June 1938	Quarter-finals Replay	Parc Lescure, Bordeaux	Czechoslovakia	2–1	Leônidas 57'; Roberto 62'
16 June 1938	Semi-finals	Stade Vélodrome, Marseille	Italy	1–2	Romeu 87'
19 June 1938	Match for third place	Parc Lescure, Bordeaux	Sweden	4–2	Romeu 44'; Leônidas 63', 74'; Perácio 80'

==== Brazil 1950 ====
Date	Stage	Venue	Opponent	Score	Brazil scorers
24 June 1950	Group 1	Estádio do Maracanã, Rio de Janeiro	Mexico	4–0	Ademir 30', 79'; Jair 65'; Baltazar 71'
28 June 1950	Group 1	Estádio do Pacaembu, São Paulo	Switzerland	2–2	Alfredo 3'; Baltazar 32'
1 July 1950	Group 1	Estádio do Maracanã, Rio de Janeiro	Yugoslavia	2–0	Ademir 3'; Zizinho 69'
First in group, progressed
9 July 1950	Final Round	Estádio do Maracanã, Rio de Janeiro	Sweden	7–1	Ademir 17', 37', 51', 59'; Chico 39', 87'; Maneca 85'
13 July 1950	Final Round	Estádio do Maracanã, Rio de Janeiro	Spain	6–1	Ademir 15', 57'; Jair 21'; Chico 29', 55'; Zizinho 74'
16 July 1950	Final Round	Estádio do Maracanã, Rio de Janeiro	Uruguay	1–2	Friaça 47'
Second in group, runners-up

==== Switzerland 1954 ====
Date	Stage	Venue	Opponent	Score	Brazil scorers
16 June 1954	Group 1	Charmilles Stadium, Geneva	Mexico	5–0	Baltazar 23'; Didi 30'; Pinga 34', 43'; Julinho 69'
19 June 1954	Group 1	Stade Olympique de la Pontaise, Lausanne	Yugoslavia	1–1 (a.e.t)	Didi 69'
First in group, progressed
27 June 1954	Quarter-finals	Wankdorf Stadium, Bern	Hungary	2–4	Djalma Santos 18' (pen.); Julinho 65'; Nílton Santos (red card) 71'; Humberto Tozzi (red card) 79'

==== Sweden 1958 ====
Date	Stage	Venue	Opponent	Score	Brazil scorers
8 June 1958	Group 4	Rimnersvallen, Uddevalla	Austria	3–0	Mazzola 37', 85'; Nílton Santos 50'
11 June 1958	Group 4	Ullevi, Gothenburg	England	0–0	
15 June 1958	Group 4	Ullevi, Gothenburg	Soviet Union	2–0	Vavá 3', 77'
First in group, progressed
19 June 1958	Quarter-finals	Ullevi, Gothenburg	Wales	1–0	Pelé 66'
24 June 1958	Semi-finals	Råsunda Stadium, Solna	France	5–2	Vavá 2'; Didi 39'; Pelé 52', 64', 75'
29 June 1958	Final	Råsunda Stadium, Solna	Sweden	5–2	Vavá 9', 32'; Pelé 55', 90'; Zagallo 68'

==== Chile 1962 ====
Date	Stage	Venue	Opponent	Score	Brazil scorers
30 May 1962	Group 3	Estadio Sausalito, Viña del Mar	Mexico	2–0	Zagallo 56'; Pelé 73'
2 June 1962	Group 3	Estadio Sausalito, Viña del Mar	Czechoslovakia	0–0	
6 June 1962	Group 3	Estadio Sausalito, Viña del Mar	Spain	2–1	Amarildo 72', 86'
First in group, progressed
10 June 1962	Quarter-finals	Estadio Sausalito, Viña del Mar	England	3–1	Garrincha 31', 59'; Vavá 53'
13 June 1962	Semi-finals	Estadio Nacional, Santiago	Chile	4–2	Garrincha 9', 32', (red card) 83'; Vavá 47', 78'
17 June 1962	Final	Estadio Nacional, Santiago	Czechoslovakia	3–1	Amarildo 17'; Zito 69'; Vavá 78'

==== England 1966 ====
Date	Stage	Venue	Opponent	Score	Brazil scorers
12 July 1966	Group 3	Goodison Park, Liverpool	Bulgaria	2–0	Pelé 15'; Garrincha 63'
15 July 1966	Group 3	Goodison Park, Liverpool	Hungary	1–3	Tostão 14'
19 July 1966	Group 3	Goodison Park, Liverpool	Portugal	1–3	Rildo 70'
Third in group, eliminated

==== Mexico 1970 ====
Date	Stage	Venue	Opponent	Score	Brazil scorers
3 June 1970	Group 3	Estadio Jalisco, Guadalajara	Czechoslovakia	4–1	Rivellino 24'; Pelé 59'; Jairzinho 61', 81'
7 June 1970	Group 3	Estadio Jalisco, Guadalajara	England	1–0	Jairzinho 59'
10 June 1970	Group 3	Estadio Jalisco, Guadalajara	Romania	3–2	Pelé 19', 67'; Jairzinho 22'
First in group, progressed
14 June 1970	Quarter-finals	Estadio Jalisco, Guadalajara	Peru	4–2	Rivellino 11'; Tostão 15', 52'; Jairzinho 75'
17 June 1970	Semi-finals	Estadio Jalisco, Guadalajara	Uruguay	3–1	Clodoaldo 44'; Jairzinho 76'; Rivellino 89'
21 June 1970	Final	Estadio Azteca, Mexico City	Italy	4–1	Pelé 18'; Gérson 66'; Jairzinho 71'; Carlos Alberto 86'

==== West Germany 1974 ====
Date	Stage	Venue	Opponent	Score	Brazil scorers
13 June 1974	Group 2	Waldstadion, Frankfurt	Yugoslavia	0–0	
18 June 1974	Group 2	Waldstadion, Frankfurt	Scotland	0–0	
22 June 1974	Group 2	Parkstadion, Gelsenkirchen	Zaire	3–0	Jairzinho 12'; Rivellino 66'; Valdomiro 79'
Second in group, progressed
26 June 1974	Group A	Niedersachsenstadion, Hanover	East Germany	1–0	Rivellino 60'
30 June 1974	Group A	Niedersachsenstadion, Hanover	Argentina	2–1	Rivellino 32'; Jairzinho 49'
3 July 1974	Group A	Westfalenstadion, Dortmund	Netherlands	0–2	Luís Pereira (red card) 84'
Second in group, progressed
6 July 1974	Match for third place	Olympiastadion, Munich	Poland	0–1	

==== Argentina 1978 ====
Date	Stage	Venue	Opponent	Score	Brazil scorers
3 June 1978	Group 3	Estadio José María Minella, Mar del Plata	Sweden	1–1	Reinaldo 45'
7 June 1978	Group 3	Estadio José María Minella, Mar del Plata	Spain	0–0	
11 June 1978	Group 3	Estadio José María Minella, Mar del Plata	Austria	1–0	Roberto Dinamite 40'
Second in group, progressed
14 June 1978	Group B	Estadio Ciudad de Mendoza, Mendoza	Peru	3–0	Dirceu 15', 27'; Zico 72' (pen.)
18 June 1978	Group B	Estadio Gigante de Arroyito, Rosario	Argentina	0–0	
21 June 1978	Group B	Estadio Ciudad de Mendoza, Mendoza	Poland	3–1	Nelinho 13'; Roberto Dinamite 58', 63'
Second in group, progressed
24 June 1978	Match for third place	Estadio Monumental, Buenos Aires	Italy	2–1	Nelinho 64'; Dirceu 71'

==== Spain 1982 ====
Date	Stage	Venue	Opponent	Score	Brazil scorers
14 June 1982	Group 6	Estadio Ramón Sánchez Pizjuán, Seville	Soviet Union	2–1	Sócrates 75'; Éder 87'
18 June 1982	Group 6	Estadio Benito Villamarín, Seville	Scotland	4–1	Zico 33'; Oscar 49'; Éder 65'; Falcão 87'
23 June 1982	Group 6	Estadio Benito Villamarin, Seville	New Zealand	4–0	Zico 28', 31'; Falcão 55'; Serginho 69'
First in group, progressed
2 July 1982	Group C	Estadio Sarriá, Barcelona	Argentina	3–1	Zico 11'; Serginho 66'; Júnior 75'
5 July 1982	Group C	Estadio Sarriá, Barcelona	Italy	2–3	Sócrates 12'; Falcão 68'
Second in group, eliminated

==== Mexico 1986 ====
Date	Stage	Venue	Opponent	Score	Brazil scorers
1 June 1986	Group D	Estadio Jalisco, Guadalajara	Spain	1–0	Sócrates 62'
6 June 1986	Group D	Estadio Jalisco, Guadalajara	Algeria	1–0	Careca 66'
12 June 1986	Group D	Estadio Jalisco, Guadalajara	Northern Ireland	3–0	Careca 15', 87'; Josimar 42'
First in group, progressed
16 June 1986	Round of 16	Estadio Jalisco, Guadalajara	Poland	4–0	Sócrates 30' (pen.); Josimar 55'; Edinho 79'; Careca 83' (pen.)
21 June 1986	Quarter-finals	Estadio Jalisco, Guadalajara	France	1–1 (a.e.t.); Penalties; 3–4	Careca 17'; Penalties; Sócrates (penalty missed); Alemão (penalty scored); Zico (penalty scored); Branco (penalty scored); Júlio César (penalty missed)

==== Italy 1990 ====
Date	Stage	Venue	Opponent	Score	Brazil scorers
10 June 1990	Group C	Stadio delle Alpi, Turin	Sweden	2–1	Careca 40', 63'
16 June 1990	Group C	Stadio delle Alpi, Turin	Costa Rica	1–0	Müller 33'
20 June 1990	Group C	Stadio delle Alpi, Turin	Scotland	1–0	Müller 82'
First in group, progressed
24 June 1990	Round of 16	Stadio delle Alpi, Turin	Argentina	0–1	Ricardo Gomes (red card) 85'

==== United States 1994 ====
Date	Stage	Venue	Opponent	Score	Brazil scorers
20 June 1994	Group B	Stanford Stadium, Palo Alto	Russia	2–0	Romário 26'; Raí 52' (pen.)
24 June 1994	Group B	Stanford Stadium, Palo Alto	Cameroon	3–0	Romário 39'; Márcio Santos 66'; Bebeto 73'
28 June 1994	Group B	Pontiac Silverdome, Pontiac	Sweden	1–1	Romário 46'
First in group, progressed
4 July 1994	Round of 16	Stanford Stadium, Palo Alto	United States	1–0	Bebeto 72'; Leonardo (red card) 43'
9 July 1994	Quarter-finals	Cotton Bowl, Dallas	Netherlands	3–2	Romário 53'; Bebeto 63'; Branco 81'
13 July 1994	Semi-finals	Rose Bowl, Pasadena	Sweden	1–0	Romário 80'
17 July 1994	Final	Rose Bowl, Pasadena	Italy	0–0 (a.e.t.); Penalties; 3–2	Penalties; Márcio Santos (penalty missed); Romário (penalty scored); Branco (penalty scored); Dunga (penalty scored)

==== France 1998 ====
Date	Stage	Venue	Opponent	Score	Brazil scorers
10 June 1998	Group A	Stade de France, Saint-Denis	Scotland	2–1	César Sampaio 4'; Boyd 73' (o.g.)
16 June 1998	Group A	Stade de la Beaujoire, Nantes	Morocco	3–0	Ronaldo 9'; Rivaldo 45+2'; Bebeto 50'
23 June 1998	Group A	Stade Vélodrome, Marseille	Norway	1–2	Bebeto 78'
First in group, progressed
27 June 1998	Round of 16	Parc des Princes, Paris	Chile	4–1	César Sampaio 11', 27'; Ronaldo 45+1' (pen.), 70'
3 July 1998	Quarter-finals	Stade de la Beaujoire, Nantes	Denmark	3–2	Bebeto 11'; Rivaldo 27', 60'
7 July 1998	Semi-finals	Stade Vélodrome, Marseille	Netherlands	1–1 (a.e.t.); Penalties; 4–2	Ronaldo 46'; Penalties; Ronaldo (penalty scored); Rivaldo (penalty scored); Emerson (penalty scored); Dunga (penalty scored)
12 July 1998	Final	Stade de France, Saint-Denis	France	0–3	

==== South Korea/Japan 2002 ====
Date	Stage	Venue	Opponent	Score	Brazil scorers
3 June 2002	Group C	Munsu Cup Stadium, Ulsan	Turkey	2–1	Ronaldo 50'; Rivaldo 87'
8 June 2002	Group C	Jeju World Cup Stadium, Seogwipo	China	4–0	Roberto Carlos 15'; Rivaldo 32'; Ronaldinho 45' (pen.); Ronaldo 55'
13 June 2002	Group C	Suwon World Cup Stadium, Suwon	Costa Rica	5–2	Ronaldo 10', 13'; Edmílson 38'; Rivaldo 62'; Júnior 64'
First in group, progressed
17 June 2002	Round of 16	Kobe Wing Stadium, Kobe	Belgium	2–0	Rivaldo 67'; Ronaldo 87'
21 June 2002	Quarter-finals	Stadium Ecopa, Shizuoka	England	2–1	Rivaldo 45+2'; Ronaldinho 50', (red card) 57'
26 June 2002	Semi-finals	Saitama Stadium, Saitama	Turkey	1–0	Ronaldo 49'
30 June 2002	Final	International Stadium Yokohama	Germany	2–0	Ronaldo 67', 79'

==== Germany 2006 ====
Date	Stage	Venue	Opponent	Score	Brazil scorers
13 June 2006	Group F	Olympiastadion, Berlin	Croatia	1–0	Kaká 44'
18 June 2006	Group F	FIFA WM Stadion München, Munich	Australia	2–0	Adriano 49'; Fred 90'
22 June 2006	Group F	FIFA WM Stadion Dortmund, Dortmund	Japan	4–1	Ronaldo 45+1', 81'; Juninho 53'; Gilberto 59'
First in group, progressed
27 June 2006	Round of 16	FIFA WM Stadion Dortmund, Dortmund	Ghana	3–0	Ronaldo 5'; Adriano 45+1'; Zé Roberto 84'
1 July 2006	Quarter-finals	FIFA WM-Stadion Frankfurt, Frankfurt	France	0–1	

==== South Africa 2010 ====
Date	Stage	Venue	Opponent	Score	Brazil scorers
15 June 2010	Group G	Ellis Park Stadium, Johannesburg	North Korea	2–1	Maicon 55'; Elano 72'
20 June 2010	Group G	Soccer City, Johannesburg	Ivory Coast	3–1	Luís Fabiano 25', 50'; Elano 62'; Kaká (red card) 88'
25 June 2010	Group G	Moses Mabhida Stadium, Durban	Portugal	0–0	
First in group, progressed
28 June 2010	Round of 16	Ellis Park Stadium, Johannesburg	Chile	3–0	Juan 35'; Luís Fabiano 38'; Robinho 59'
2 July 2010	Quarter-finals	Nelson Mandela Bay Stadium, Port Elizabeth	Netherlands	1–2	Robinho 10'; Felipe Melo (red card) 73'

==== Brazil 2014 ====
Date	Stage	Venue	Opponent	Score	Brazil scorers
12 June 2014	Group A	Arena de São Paulo, São Paulo	Croatia	3–1	Neymar 29', 71' (pen.); Oscar 90+1'
17 June 2014	Group A	Estádio Castelão, Fortaleza	Mexico	0–0	
23 June 2014	Group A	Estádio Nacional Mané Garrincha, Brasília	Cameroon	4–1	Neymar 17', 35'; Fred 49'; Fernandinho 84'
First in group, progressed
28 June 2014	Round of 16	Estádio Mineirão, Belo Horizonte	Chile	1–1 (a.e.t.); Penalties; 3–2	David Luiz 18'; Penalties; David Luiz (penalty scored); Willian (penalty missed); Marcelo (penalty scored); Hulk (penalty missed); Neymar (penalty scored)
4 July 2014	Quarter-finals	Estádio Castelão, Fortaleza	Colombia	2–1	Thiago Silva 7'; David Luiz 69'
8 July 2014	Semi-finals	Estádio Mineirão, Belo Horizonte	Germany	1–7	Oscar 90'
12 July 2014	Match for third place	Estádio Nacional Mané Garrincha, Brasília	Netherlands	0–3	

==== Russia 2018 ====
Date	Stage	Venue	Opponent	Score	Brazil scorers
17 June 2018	Group E	Rostov Arena, Rostov-on-Don	Switzerland	1–1	Coutinho 20'
22 June 2018	Group E	Krestovsky Stadium, Saint Petersburg	Costa Rica	2–0	Coutinho 90+1'; Neymar 90+7'
27 June 2018	Group E	Otkritie Arena, Moscow	Serbia	2–0	Paulinho 36'; Thiago Silva 68'
First in group, progressed
2 July 2018	Round of 16	Cosmos Arena, Samara	Mexico	2–0	Neymar 51'; Firmino 88'
6 July 2018	Quarter-finals	Kazan Arena, Kazan	Belgium	1–2	Renato Augusto 76'

==== Qatar 2022 ====
Date	Stage	Venue	Opponent	Score	Brazil scorers
24 November 2022	Group G	Lusail Stadium, Lusail	Serbia	2–0	Richarlison 62', 73'
28 November 2022	Group G	Stadium 974, Doha	Switzerland	1–0	Casemiro 82'
2 December 2022	Group G	Lusail Stadium, Lusail	Cameroon	0–1	
First in group, progressed
5 December 2022	Round of 16	Stadium 974, Doha	South Korea	4–1	Vinícius Júnior 7'; Neymar 13' (pen.); Richarlison 29'; Paquetá 36'
9 December 2022	Quarter-finals	Education City Stadium, Al Rayyan	Croatia	1–1 (a.e.t.); Penalties; 2–4	Neymar 105+1'; Penalties; Rodrygo (penalty missed); Casemiro (penalty scored); Pedro (penalty scored); Marquinhos (penalty missed)

==== Canada/Mexico/United States 2026 ====
Date	Stage	Venue	Opponent	Score	Brazil scorers
13 June 2026	Group C	MetLife Stadium, East Rutherford	Morocco	1–1	Vinícius Júnior 32'
19 June 2026	Group C	Lincoln Financial Field, Philadelphia	Haiti	3–0	Cunha 23', 36'; Vinícius Júnior 45+3'
24 June 2026	Group C	Hard Rock Stadium, Miami Gardens	Scotland	3–0	Vinícius Júnior 7', 45+3'; Cunha 60'
First in group, progressed
29 June 2026	Round of 32	NRG Stadium, Houston	Japan	2–1	Casemiro 56'; Martinelli 90+5'
5 July 2026	Round of 16	MetLife Stadium, East Rutherford	Norway	1–2	Neymar 90+10' (pen.)

=== FIFA Confederations Cup ===
==== Saudi Arabia 1997 ====
Date	Stage	Venue	Opponent	Score	Brazil scorers
12 December 1997	Group A	King Fahd II Stadium, Riyadh	Saudi Arabia	3–0	César Sampaio 65'; Romário 73', 80'
14 December 1997	Group A	King Fahd II Stadium, Riyadh	Australia	0–0	
16 December 1997	Group A	King Fahd II Stadium, Riyadh	Mexico	3–2	Romário 41' (pen.); Denílson 61'; Júnior Baiano 66'
First in group, progressed
19 December 1997	Semi-finals	King Fahd II Stadium, Riyadh	Czech Republic	2–0	Romário 54'; Ronaldo 83'
21 December 1997	Final	King Fahd II Stadium, Riyadh	Australia	6–0	Ronaldo 15', 27', 59' (pen.); Romário 38', 53', 75'

==== Mexico 1999 ====
Date	Stage	Venue	Opponent	Score	Brazil scorers
24 July 1999	Group B	Estadio Jalisco, Guadalajara	Germany	4–0	Zé Roberto 62'; Ronaldinho 72' (pen.); Alex 86', 87'
28 July 1999	Group B	Estadio Jalisco, Guadalajara	United States	1–0	Ronaldinho 13'
30 July 1999	Group B	Estadio Jalisco, Guadalajara	New Zealand	2–0	Marcos Paulo 45+2'; Ronaldinho 88'
First in group, progressed
1 August 1999	Semi-finals	Estadio Jalisco, Guadalajara	Saudi Arabia	8–2	João Carlos 8'; Ronaldinho 11', 65', 90+2'; Zé Roberto 33'; Alex 36', 86'; Roni 62'
4 August 1999	Final	Estadio Azteca, Mexico City	Mexico	3–4	Serginho 43' (pen.); Roni 47'; Zé Roberto 63'; João Carlos (red card) 90+2'

==== Korea/Japan 2001 ====
Date	Stage	Venue	Opponent	Score	Brazil scorers
31 May 2001	Group B	Kashima Soccer Stadium, Ibaraki	Cameroon	2–0	Washington 53'; Carlos Miguel 57'
2 June 2001	Group B	Kashima Soccer Stadium, Ibaraki	Canada	0–0	
4 June 2001	Group B	Kashima Soccer Stadium, Ibaraki	Japan	0–0	
Second in group, progressed
7 June 2001	Semi-finals	Suwon World Cup Stadium, Suwon	France	1–2	Ramon 30'
9 June 2001	Third place play-off	Munsu Cup Stadium, Ulsan	Australia	0–1	

==== France 2003 ====
Date	Stage	Venue	Opponent	Score	Brazil scorers
19 June 2003	Group B	Stade de France, Saint-Denis	Cameroon	0–1	
21 June 2003	Group B	Stade de Gerland, Lyon	United States	1–0	Adriano 22'
23 June 2003	Group B	Stade Geoffroy-Guichard, Saint-Étienne	Turkey	2–2	Adriano 23'; Alex 90+3'; Ronaldinho (red card) 90+3'
Third in group, eliminated

==== Germany 2005 ====
Date	Stage	Venue	Opponent	Score	Brazil scorers
16 June 2005	Group B	Zentralstadion, Leipzig	Greece	3–0	Adriano 41'; Robinho 46'; Juninho 81'
19 June 2005	Group B	AWD-Arena, Hanover	Mexico	0–1	
22 June 2005	Group B	RheinEnergieStadion, Cologne	Japan	2–2	Robinho 10'; Ronaldinho 32'
Second in group, progressed
25 June 2005	Semi-finals	Frankenstadion, Nuremberg	Germany	3–2	Adriano 21', 76'; Ronaldinho 43' (pen.)
29 June 2005	Final	Waldstadion, Frankfurt	Argentina	4–1	Adriano 11', 63'; Kaká 16'; Ronaldinho 47'

==== South Africa 2009 ====
Date	Stage	Venue	Opponent	Score	Brazil scorers
15 June 2009	Group B	Free State Stadium, Bloemfontein	Egypt	4–3	Kaká 5', 90' (pen.); Luís Fabiano 12'; Juan 37'
18 June 2009	Group B	Loftus Versfeld Stadium, Pretoria	United States	3–0	Felipe Melo 7'; Robinho 20'; Maicon 62'
21 June 2009	Group B	Loftus Versfeld Stadium, Pretoria	Italy	3–0	Luís Fabiano 37', 43'; Dossena 45' (o.g.)
First in group, progressed
25 June 2009	Semi-finals	Coca-Cola Park, Johannesburg	South Africa	1–0	Dani Alves 88'
28 June 2009	Final	Coca-Cola Park, Johannesburg	United States	3–2	Luís Fabiano 46', 74'; Lúcio 84'

==== Brazil 2013 ====
Date	Stage	Venue	Opponent	Score	Brazil scorers
15 June 2013	Group A	Estádio Nacional, Brasília	Japan	3–0	Neymar 3'; Paulinho 48'; Jô 90+3'
19 June 2013	Group A	Estádio Castelão, Fortaleza	Mexico	2–0	Neymar 9'; Jô 90+3'
22 June 2013	Group A	Arena Fonte Nova, Salvador	Italy	4–2	Dante 45+1'; Neymar 55'; Fred 66', 89'
First in group, progressed
26 June 2013	Semi-finals	Estádio Mineirão, Belo Horizonte	Uruguay	2–1	Fred 41'; Paulinho 86'
30 June 2013	Final	Estádio do Maracanã, Rio de Janeiro	Spain	3–0	Fred 2', 47'; Neymar 44'

=== Copa América/South American Championship ===
==== Argentina 1916 ====
Date	Stage	Venue	Opponent	Score	Brazil scorers
8 July 1916	Final round	Estadio G.E.B.A., Buenos Aires	Chile	1–1	Demósthenes 29'
10 July 1916	Final round	Estadio G.E.B.A., Buenos Aires	Argentina	1–1	Alencar 23'
12 July 1916	Final round	Estadio G.E.B.A., Buenos Aires	Uruguay	1–2	Friedenreich 8'
Third in group, third place

==== Uruguay 1917 ====
Date	Stage	Venue	Opponent	Score	Brazil scorers
3 October 1917	Final round	Parque Pereira, Montevideo	Argentina	2–4	Neco 8'; Lagreca 39' (pen.)
7 October 1917	Final round	Parque Pereira, Montevideo	Uruguay	0–4	
12 October 1917	Final round	Parque Pereira, Montevideo	Chile	5–0	Caetano 21'; Neco 23'; Haroldo 26', 59'; Amílcar 41'
Third in group, third place

==== Brazil 1919 ====
Date	Stage	Venue	Opponent	Score	Brazil scorers
11 May 1919	Final round	Estadio das Laranjeiras, Rio de Janeiro	Chile	6–0	Friedenreich 19', 38', 76'; Neco 21', 83'; Haroldo 79'
18 May 1919	Final round	Estadio das Laranjeiras, Rio de Janeiro	Argentina	3–1	Héitor 22'; Amílcar 57'; Millón 77'
26 May 1919	Final round	Estadio das Laranjeiras, Rio de Janeiro	Uruguay	2–2	Neco 29', 63'
First in group, progressed
29 May 1919	Final round Playoff	Estadio das Laranjeiras, Rio de Janeiro	Uruguay	1–0 (a.e.t.)	Friedenreich 122'

==== Chile 1920 ====
Date	Stage	Venue	Opponent	Score	Brazil scorers
11 September 1920	Final round	Estadio Valparaíso Sporting Club, Viña del Mar	Chile	1–0	Alvariza 53'
18 September 1920	Final round	Estadio Valparaíso Sporting Club, Viña del Mar	Uruguay	0–6	
25 September 1920	Final round	Estadio Valparaíso Sporting Club, Viña del Mar	Argentina	0–2	
Third in group, third place

==== Argentina 1921 ====
Date	Stage	Venue	Opponent	Score	Brazil scorers
2 October 1921	Final round	Sportivo Barracas Stadium, Buenos Aires	Argentina	0–1	
12 October 1921	Final round	Sportivo Barracas Stadium, Buenos Aires	Paraguay	3–0	Machado 21', 44'; Candiota 46'
23 October 1921	Final round	Sportivo Barracas Stadium, Buenos Aires	Uruguay	1–2	Zezé 53'
Second in group, runners-up

==== Brazil 1922 ====
Date	Stage	Venue	Opponent	Score	Brazil scorers
17 September 1922	Final round	Estadio das Laranjeiras, Rio de Janeiro	Chile	1–1	Tatú 9'
24 September 1922	Final round	Estadio das Laranjeiras, Rio de Janeiro	Paraguay	1–1	Amílcar 14'
1 October 1922	Final round	Estadio das Laranjeiras, Rio de Janeiro	Uruguay	0–0	
15 October 1922	Final round	Estadio das Laranjeiras, Rio de Janeiro	Argentina	2–0	Neco 42'; Amílcar 86' (pen.)
First in group, progressed
22 October 1922	Final round Playoff	Estadio das Laranjeiras, Rio de Janeiro	Paraguay	3–0	Neco 11'; Formiga 48', 89'

==== Uruguay 1923 ====
Date	Stage	Venue	Opponent	Score	Brazil scorers
11 November 1923	Final round	Parque Central, Montevideo	Paraguay	0–1	
18 November 1923	Final round	Parque Central, Montevideo	Argentina	1–2	Nilo 15'
25 November 1923	Final round	Parque Central, Montevideo	Uruguay	1–2	Nilo 59'
Fourth in group, fourth place

==== Argentina 1925 ====
Date	Stage	Venue	Opponent	Score	Brazil scorers
6 December 1925	Final round	Sportivo Barracas Stadium, Buenos Aires	Paraguay	5–2	Moderato 16'; Friedenreich 21'; Lagarto 42', 47'; Nilo 72'
13 December 1925	Final round	Sportivo Barracas Stadium, Buenos Aires	Argentina	1–4	Nilo 22'
17 December 1925	Final round	Estadio Ministro Brin y Senguel, Buenos Aires	Paraguay	3–1	Nilo 30'; Lagarto 57', 61'
25 December 1925	Final round	Estadio Ministro Brin y Senguel, Buenos Aires	Argentina	2–2	Friedenreich 27'; Nilo 30'
Second in group, runners-up

==== Argentina 1937 ====
Date	Stage	Venue	Opponent	Score	Brazil scorers
27 December 1936	Final round	Estadio Alvear y Tagle, Buenos Aires	Peru	3–2	Roberto 7'; Afonsinho 30'; Niginho 57'
3 January 1937	Final round	Estadio Alvear y Tagle, Buenos Aires	Chile	6–4	Patesko 2', 26'; Carvalho Leite 6'; Luizinho 35', 40'; Roberto 68'
13 January 1937	Final round	Gasómetro de Boedo, Buenos Aires	Paraguay	5–0	Patesko 31', 67'; Luizinho 42', 51'; Carvalho Leite 59'
19 January 1937	Final round	Gasómetro de Boedo, Buenos Aires	Uruguay	3–2	Carvalho Leite 36'; Bahia 72'; Niginho 77'
30 January 1937	Final round	Gasómetro de Boedo, Buenos Aires	Argentina	0–1	
First in group, progressed
1 February 1937	Final round Playoff	Gasómetro de Boedo, Buenos Aires	Argentina	0–2 (a.e.t.)	

==== Uruguay 1942 ====
Date	Stage	Venue	Opponent	Score	Brazil scorers
14 January 1942	Final round	Estadio Centenario, Montevideo	Chile	6–1	Patesko 1', 78'; Pirillo 23', 63', 86'; Cláudio 66'
17 January 1942	Final round	Estadio Centenario, Montevideo	Argentina	1–2	Servílio 37'
21 January 1942	Final round	Estadio Centenario, Montevideo	Peru	2–1	Amorim 43', 56'
24 January 1942	Final round	Estadio Centenario, Montevideo	Uruguay	0–1	
31 January 1942	Final round	Estadio Centenario, Montevideo	Ecuador	5–1	Tim 10'; Pirillo 12', 29', 76'; Zizinho 60'
5 February 1942	Final round	Estadio Centenario, Montevideo	Paraguay	1–1	Zizinho 5'
Third in group, third place

==== Chile 1945 ====
Date	Stage	Venue	Opponent	Score	Brazil scorers
18 January 1945	Final round	Estadio Nacional, Santiago	Colombia	3–0	Jorginho 13'; Heleno 15'; Jaime 38'
28 January 1945	Final round	Estadio Nacional, Santiago	Bolivia	2–0	Ademir 48'; Tesourinha 80'
7 February 1945	Final round	Estadio Nacional, Santiago	Uruguay	3–0	Heleno 8', 32'; Rui 20'
15 February 1945	Final round	Estadio Nacional, Santiago	Argentina	1–3	Ademir 32'
21 February 1945	Final round	Estadio Nacional, Santiago	Ecuador	9–2	Ademir 3', 10', 75'; Heleno 22', 28'; Zizinho 40', 65'; Jair 67', 68'
28 February 1945	Final round	Estadio Nacional, Santiago	Chile	1–0	Heleno 20'
Second in group, runners-up

==== Argentina 1946 ====
Date	Stage	Venue	Opponent	Score	Brazil scorers
16 January 1946	Final round	Gasómetro de Boedo, Buenos Aires	Bolivia	3–0	Heleno 47', 78'; Zizinho 65'
23 January 1946	Final round	Gasómetro de Boedo, Buenos Aires	Uruguay	4–3	Jair 1', 16'; Heleno 39'; Chico 44'
29 January 1945	Final round	Estadio Almirante Cordero, Avellaneda	Paraguay	1–1	Norival 63'
2 February 1946	Final round	Gasómetro de Boedo, Buenos Aires	Chile	5–1	Zizinho 4', 41', 46', 71'; Chico 89'
10 February 1946	Final round	Estadio Monumental, Buenos Aires	Argentina	0–2	
Second in group, runners-up

==== Brazil 1949 ====
Date	Stage	Venue	Opponent	Score	Brazil scorers
3 April 1949	Final round	Estádio São Januário, Rio de Janeiro	Ecuador	9–1	Tesourinha 3', 42'; Octavio 10'; Jair 13', 35'; Simão 16', 25'; Zizinho 67'; Ademir 88'
10 April 1949	Final round	Estádio do Pacaembu, São Paulo	Bolivia	10–1	Nininho 16', 39', 86'; Jair 17'; Zizinho 25', 80'; Cláudio 49', 84'; Simão 71', 79'
13 April 1949	Final round	Estádio do Pacaembu, São Paulo	Chile	2–1	Zizinho 20'; Cláudio 49' (pen.)
17 April 1949	Final round	Estádio do Pacaembu, São Paulo	Colombia	5–0	Tesourinha 20'; Canhotinho 24' (pen.); Orlando 44'; Ademir 47', 87'
24 April 1949	Final round	Estádio São Januário, Rio de Janeiro	Peru	7–1	Arce 11' (o.g.); Augusto 15'; Jair 17', 20'; Simão 54'; Ademir 82'; Orlando 88'; Zizinho (red card) 40'
30 April 1949	Final round	Estádio São Januário, Rio de Janeiro	Uruguay	5–1	Jair 15', 40' (pen.); Zizinho 24'; Alvim 79'; Tesourinha 89' (pen.)
8 May 1949	Final round	Estádio São Januário, Rio de Janeiro	Paraguay	1–2	Tesourinha 33'
First in group, progressed
11 May 1949	Final round Playoff	Estádio São Januário, Rio de Janeiro	Paraguay	7–0	Ademir 17', 27', 48'; Tesourinha 43', 70'; Jair 72', 89'

==== Peru 1953 ====
Date	Stage	Venue	Opponent	Score	Brazil scorers
1 March 1953	Final round	Estadio Nacional, Lima	Bolivia	8–1	Julinho 18', 20', 42', 52'; Rodrigues 25', 44'; Pinga 39', 60'
12 March 1953	Final round	Estadio Nacional, Lima	Ecuador	2–0	Ademir 18'; Cláudio 55'
15 March 1953	Final round	Estadio Nacional, Lima	Uruguay	1–0	Ipojucan 87'
19 March 1953	Final round	Estadio Nacional, Lima	Peru	0–1	
23 March 1953	Final round	Estadio Nacional, Lima	Chile	3–2	Julinho 1'; Zizinho 53'; Baltazar 70'
27 March 1953	Final round	Estadio Nacional, Lima	Paraguay	1–2	Nílton Santos 12'
Second in group, progressed
1 April 1953	Final round Playoff	Estadio Nacional, Lima	Paraguay	2–3	Baltazar 56', 65'

==== Uruguay 1956 ====
Date	Stage	Venue	Opponent	Score	Brazil scorers
24 January 1956	Final round	Estadio Centenario, Montevideo	Chile	1–4	Maurinho 38'
29 January 1956	Final round	Estadio Centenario, Montevideo	Paraguay	0–0	
1 February 1956	Final round	Estadio Centenario, Montevideo	Peru	2–1	Alvaro 10'; Zezinho 80'
5 February 1956	Final round	Estadio Centenario, Montevideo	Argentina	1–0	Luizinho 88'
10 February 1956	Final round	Estadio Centenario, Montevideo	Uruguay	0–0	
Fourth in group, fourth place

==== Peru 1957 ====
Date	Stage	Venue	Opponent	Score	Brazil scorers
13 March 1957	Final round	Estadio Nacional, Lima	Chile	4–2	Didi 20', 26', 44'; Pepe 46'
21 March 1957	Final round	Estadio Nacional, Lima	Ecuador	7–1	Evaristo 22', 89'; Pepe 25'; Zizinho 34' (pen.); Joel 43', 68'; Didi 78'
24 March 1957	Final round	Estadio Nacional, Lima	Colombia	9–0	Pepe 27'; Evaristo 41', 44', 45', 75', 86'; Didi 50', 60'; Zizinho 85'
28 March 1957	Final round	Estadio Nacional, Lima	Uruguay	2–3	Evaristo 68'; Didi 70'
31 March 1957	Final round	Estadio Nacional, Lima	Peru	1–0	Didi 73'
3 April 1957	Final round	Estadio Nacional, Lima	Argentina	0–3	
Second in group, runners-up

==== Argentina 1959 ====
Date	Stage	Venue	Opponent	Score	Brazil scorers
10 March 1959	Final round	Monumental de Nuñez, Buenos Aires	Peru	2–2	Didi 24'; Pelé 48'
15 March 1959	Final round	Monumental de Nuñez, Buenos Aires	Chile	3–0	Pelé 43', 45'; Didi 89'
21 March 1959	Final round	Monumental de Nuñez, Buenos Aires	Bolivia	4–2	Pelé 16'; Valentim 18', 26'; Didi 89'
26 March 1959	Final round	Monumental de Nuñez, Buenos Aires	Uruguay	3–1	Valentim 62', 80', 89'; Orlando (red card) 32'; Almir (red card) 32'
29 March 1959	Final round	Monumental de Nuñez, Buenos Aires	Paraguay	4–1	Pelé 25', 60', 63'; Chinesinho 35'
4 April 1959	Final round	Monumental de Nuñez, Buenos Aires	Argentina	1–1	Pelé 58'
Second in group, runners-up

==== Ecuador 1959 ====
Date	Stage	Venue	Opponent	Score	Brazil scorers
5 December 1959	Final round	Estadio Modelo, Guayaquil	Paraguay	3–2	Paulo 25', 39'; Zé de Mello 55'
12 December 1959	Final round	Estadio Modelo, Guayaquil	Uruguay	0–3	
19 December 1959	Final round	Estadio Modelo, Guayaquil	Ecuador	3–1	Paulo 23'; Geraldo 42'; Zé de Mello 45'
22 December 1959	Final round	Estadio Modelo, Guayaquil	Argentina	1–4	Geraldo 64'
Third in group, third place

==== Bolivia 1963 ====
Date	Stage	Venue	Opponent	Score	Brazil scorers
10 March 1963	Final round	Félix Capriles, Cochabamba	Peru	1–0	Flávio 16'
14 March 1963	Final round	Hernando Siles, La Paz	Colombia	5–1	Flávio 7', 82'; Marco Antônio 31'; Oswaldo 56'; Fernando 83'
17 March 1963	Final round	Hernando Siles, La Paz	Paraguay	0–2	
24 March 1963	Final round	Hernando Siles, La Paz	Argentina	0–3	
27 March 1963	Final round	Félix Capriles, Cochabamba	Ecuador	2–2	Oswaldo 5', 60'
31 March 1963	Final round	Félix Capriles, Cochabamba	Bolivia	4–5	Marco Antônio 26'; Almir 28'; Flávio 63', 66'
Fourth in group, fourth place

==== 1975 ====
Date	Stage	Venue	Opponent	Score	Brazil scorers
31 July 1975	Group 1	Estadio Olímpico, Caracas, Venezuela	Venezuela	4–0	Romeu 2'; Danival 50'; Palhinha 82', 88'
6 August 1975	Group 1	Mineirão, Belo Horizonte, Brazil	Argentina	2–1	Nelinho 31', 55' (pen.)
13 August 1975	Group 1	Mineirão, Belo Horizonte, Brazil	Venezuela	6–0	Roberto Batata 6', 79'; Nelinho 9'; Danival 37'; Campos 53'; Palhinha 65'
16 August 1975	Group 1	Gigante de Arroyito, Rosario, Argentina	Argentina	1–0	Danival 45'
First in group, progressed
30 September 1975	Semi-finals first leg	Mineirão, Belo Horizonte, Brazil	Peru	1–3	Roberto Batata 54'
4 October 1975	Semi-finals second leg	Estadio Alejandro Villanueva, Lima, Peru	Peru	2–0	Mélendez 10' (o.g.); Campos 61'
3–3 on aggregate, eliminated by drawing of lots

==== 1979 ====
Date	Stage	Venue	Opponent	Score	Brazil scorers
26 July 1979	Group B	Estadio Hernando Siles, La Paz, Bolivia	Bolivia	1–2	Roberto Dinamite 30' (pen.)
2 August 1979	Group B	Estádio do Maracanã, Rio de Janeiro, Brazil	Argentina	2–1	Zico 2'; Tita 54'
16 August 1979	Group B	Estádio do Morumbi, São Paulo, Brazil	Bolivia	2–0	Tita 46'; Zico 90'
23 August 1979	Group B	Monumental de Nuñez, Buenos Aires, Argentina	Argentina	2–2	Sócrates 17', 65' (pen.); Zico (red card) 28'
First in group, progressed
24 October 1979	Semi-finals first leg	Defensores del Chaco, Asunción, Paraguay	Paraguay	1–2	Palhinha 79'
31 October 1979	Semi-finals second leg	Estádio do Maracanã, Rio de Janeiro, Brazil	Paraguay	2–2	Falcão 29'; Sócrates 61' (pen.)
3–4 on aggregate, eliminated

==== 1983 ====
Date	Stage	Venue	Opponent	Score	Brazil scorers
17 August 1983	Group B	Estadio Olímpico Atahualpa, Quito, Ecuador	Ecuador	1–0	Roberto Dinamite 14'
24 August 1983	Group B	Estadio Monumental, Buenos Aires, Argentina	Argentina	0–1	
1 September 1983	Group B	Estádio Serra Dourada, Goiânia, Brazil	Ecuador	5–0	Renato Gaúcho 12'; Roberto Dinamite 46', 55'; Éder 58'; Tita 60'
14 September 1983	Group B	Maracanã, Rio de Janeiro, Brazil	Argentina	0–0	
First in group, progressed
13 October 1983	Semi-finals first leg	Defensores del Chaco, Asunción, Paraguay	Paraguay	1–1	Éder 88'
20 October 1983	Semi-finals second leg	Estádio Parque do Sabiá, Uberlandia, Brazil	Paraguay	0–0	
27 October 1983	Final	Estadio Centenario, Montevideo, Uruguay	Uruguay	0–2	
4 November 1983	Final	Estádio Fonte Nova, Salvador, Brazil	Uruguay	1–1	Jorginho 23'

==== Argentina 1987 ====
Date	Stage	Venue	Opponent	Score	Brazil scorers
28 June 1987	Group B	Estadio Olímpico Chateau Carreras, Córdoba	Venezuela	5–0	Edu 33'; Morovic 39' (o.g.); Careca 66'; Nelsinho 72'; Romário 89'
3 July 1987	Group B	Estadio Olímpico Chateau Carreras, Córdoba	Chile	0–4	
Second in group, eliminated

==== Brazil 1989 ====
Date	Stage	Venue	Opponent	Score	Brazil scorers
1 July 1989	Group A	Estádio Fonte Nova, Salvador	Venezuela	3–1	Bebeto 2'; Geovani 36' (pen.); Baltazar 57'
3 July 1989	Group A	Estádio Fonte Nova, Salvador	Peru	0–0	
7 July 1989	Group A	Estádio Fonte Nova, Salvador	Colombia	0–0	
9 July 1989	Group A	Estádio do Arruda, Recife	Paraguay	2–0	Bebeto 47', 82'
Second in group, progressed
12 July 1989	Final round	Estádio do Maracanã, Rio de Janeiro	Argentina	2–0	Bebeto 48'; Romário 55'
14 July 1989	Final round	Estádio do Maracanã, Rio de Janeiro	Paraguay	3–0	Bebeto 16', 52'; Romário 58'
16 July 1989	Final round	Estádio do Maracanã, Rio de Janeiro	Uruguay	1–0	Romário 49'
First in group, champions

==== Chile 1991 ====
Date	Stage	Venue	Opponent	Score	Brazil scorers
9 July 1991	Group B	Estadio Sausalito, Viña del Mar	Bolivia	2–1	Neto 5' (pen.); Branco 47'
11 July 1991	Group B	Estadio Sausalito, Viña del Mar	Uruguay	1–1	João Paulo 29'
13 July 1991	Group B	Estadio Sausalito, Viña del Mar	Colombia	0–2	
15 July 1991	Group B	Estadio Sausalito, Viña del Mar	Ecuador	3–1	Mazinho 8'; Márcio Santos 54'; Luís Henrique 89'
Second in group, progressed
17 July 1991	Final round	Estadio Nacional de Chile, Santiago	Argentina	2–3	Branco 5'; João Paulo 52'
19 July 1991	Final round	Estadio Nacional de Chile, Santiago	Colombia	2–0	Renato Gaúcho 29'; Branco 76' (pen.)
21 July 1991	Final round	Estadio Nacional de Chile, Santiago	Chile	2–0	Mazinho 8'; Luís Henrique 55'
Second in group, runners-up

==== Ecuador 1993 ====
Date	Stage	Venue	Opponent	Score	Brazil scorers
18 June 1993	Group B	Estadio Alejandro Serrano Aguilar, Cuenca	Peru	0–0	
21 June 1993	Group B	Estadio Alejandro Serrano Aguilar, Cuenca	Chile	2–3	Müller 36'; Palhinha 55'
24 June 1993	Group B	Estadio Alejandro Serrano Aguilar, Cuenca	Paraguay	3–0	Palhinha 15', 72'; Edmundo 62'
Second in group, progressed
27 June 1993	Quarter-finals	Estadio Monumental, Guayaquil	Argentina	1–1; Penalties; 5–6	Müller 37'; Penalties; Zinho (penalty scored); Cafu (penalty scored); Müller (penalty scored); Roberto Carlos (penalty scored); Luizinho (penalty scored); Boiadeiro (penalty missed)

==== Uruguay 1995 ====
Date	Stage	Venue	Opponent	Score	Brazil scorers
7 July 1995	Group B	Estadio Atilio Paiva Olivera, Rivera	Ecuador	1–0	Ronaldão 73'
10 July 1995	Group B	Estadio Atilio Paiva Olivera, Rivera	Peru	2–0	Zinho 77' (pen.); Edmundo 82'
13 July 1995	Group B	Estadio Atilio Paiva Olivera, Rivera	Colombia	3–0	Leonardo 30'; Túlio 76'; Higuita 85' (o.g.)
First in group, progressed
17 July 1995	Quarter-finals	Estadio Atilio Paiva Olivera, Rivera	Argentina	2–2; Penalties; 4–2	Edmundo 9'; Túlio 81' Penalties; Roberto Carlos (penalty scored); Túlio (penalty scored); André Cruz (penalty missed); Dunga (penalty scored); Edmundo (penalty scored)
20 July 1995	Semi-finals	Estadio Domingo Burgueño, Maldonado	United States	1–0	Aldair 13'
22 June 1995	Final	Estadio Centenario, Montevideo	Uruguay	1–1; Penalties; 3–5	Túlio 30' Penalties; Roberto Carlos (penalty scored); Zinho (penalty scored); Túlio (penalty missed); Dunga (penalty scored)

==== Bolivia 1997 ====
Date	Stage	Venue	Opponent	Score	Brazil scorers
13 June 1997	Group C	Estadio Ramón Aguilera, Santa Cruz	Costa Rica	5–0	Djalminha 20'; González 34' (o.g.); Ronaldo 47', 54'; Romário 60'
16 June 1997	Group C	Estadio Ramón Aguilera, Santa Cruz	Mexico	3–2	Aldair 47'; Romero 59' (o.g.); Leonardo 77'
19 June 1997	Group C	Estadio Ramón Aguilera, Santa Cruz	Colombia	2–0	Dunga 11'; Edmundo 67'
First in group, progressed
22 June 1997	Quarter-finals	Estadio Ramón Aguilera, Santa Cruz	Paraguay	2–0	Ronaldo 9', 34'
26 June 1997	Semi-finals	Estadio Ramón Aguilera, Santa Cruz	Peru	7–0	Denílson 1'; Flávio Conceição 28'; Romário 36', 49'; Leonardo 45', 55'; Djalminha 77'
29 June 1997	Final	Estadio Hernando Siles, La Paz	Bolivia	3–1	Edmundo 40'; Ronaldo 79'; Zé Roberto 90'

==== Paraguay 1999 ====
Date	Stage	Venue	Opponent	Score	Brazil scorers
30 June 1999	Group B	Estadio Antonio Oddone Sarubbi, Ciudad del Este	Venezuela	7–0	Ronaldo 28', 62'; Emerson 40'; Amoroso 54', 81'; Ronaldinho 74'; Rivaldo 82'
3 July 1999	Group B	Estadio Antonio Oddone Sarubbi, Ciudad del Este	Mexico	2–1	Amoroso 20'; Alex 45'
6 July 1999	Group B	Estadio Antonio Oddone Sarubbi, Ciudad del Este	Chile	1–0	Ronaldo 36' (pen.)
First in group, progressed
11 July 1999	Quarter-finals	Estadio Antonio Oddone Sarubbi, Ciudad del Este	Argentina	2–1	Rivaldo 32'; Ronaldo 48'
14 July 1999	Semi-finals	Estadio Antonio Oddone Sarubbi, Ciudad del Este	Mexico	2–0	Amoroso 24'; Rivaldo 42'
18 June 1999	Final	Estadio Defensores del Chaco, Asunción	Uruguay	3–0	Rivaldo 20', 27'; Ronaldo 46'

==== Colombia 2001 ====
Date	Stage	Venue	Opponent	Score	Brazil scorers
12 July 2001	Group B	Estadio Pascual Guerrero, Cali	Mexico	0–1	
15 July 2001	Group B	Estadio Pascual Guerrero, Cali	Peru	2–0	Guilherme 9'; Denílson 85'
18 July 2001	Group B	Estadio Pascual Guerrero, Cali	Paraguay	3–1	Alex 60'; Belletti 89'; Denílson 90'
First in group, progressed
23 July 2001	Quarter-finals	Estadio Palogrande, Manizales	Honduras	0–2	

==== Peru 2004 ====
Date	Stage	Venue	Opponent	Score	Brazil scorers
8 July 2004	Group C	Estadio Monumental Virgen de Chapi, Arequipa	Chile	1–0	Luís Fabiano 90'
11 July 2004	Group C	Estadio Monumental Virgen de Chapi, Arequipa	Costa Rica	4–0	Adriano 45', 54', 67'; Juan 49'
14 July 2004	Group C	Estadio Monumental Virgen de Chapi, Arequipa	Paraguay	1–2	Luís Fabiano 35'
Second in group, progressed
17 July 2004	Quarter-finals	Estadio Miguel Grau, Piura	Mexico	4–0	Alex 26' (pen.); Adriano 65', 78'; Ricardo Oliveira 87'
21 July 2004	Semi-finals	Estadio Nacional, Lima	Uruguay	1–1; Penalties; 5–3	Adriano 46'; Penalties; Luisão (penalty scored); Luís Fabiano (penalty scored); Adriano (penalty scored); Renato (penalty scored); Alex (penalty scored)
25 July 2004	Final	Estadio Nacional, Lima	Argentina	2–2; Penalties; 4–2	Luisão 45'; Adriano 90+3'; Penalties; Adriano (penalty scored); Edu (penalty scored); Diego (penalty scored); Juan (penalty scored)

==== Venezuela 2007 ====
Date	Stage	Venue	Opponent	Score	Brazil scorers
27 June 2007	Group B	Polideportivo Cachamay, Puerto Ordaz	Mexico	0–2	
1 July 2007	Group B	Estadio Monumental de Maturín, Maturín	Chile	3–0	Robinho 36' (pen.), 84', 87'
4 July 2007	Group B	Estadio Olímpico Luis Ramos, Puerto la Cruz	Ecuador	1–0	Robinho 56' (pen.)
Second in group, progressed
7 July 2007	Quarter-finals	Estadio Olímpico Luis Ramos, Puerto la Cruz	Chile	6–1	Juan 16'; Júlio Baptista 23'; Robinho 27', 50'; Josué 68'; Vágner Love 85'
10 July 2007	Semi-finals	Estadio José Pachencho Romero, Maracaibo	Uruguay	2–2; Penalties; 5–4	Maicon 13'; Júlio Baptista 41'; Penalties; Robinho (penalty scored); Juan (penalty scored); Gilberto Silva (penalty scored); Afonso Alves (penalty missed); Diego (penalty scored); Fernando (penalty missed); Gilberto (penalty scored)
15 July 2007	Final	Estadio José Pachencho Romero, Maracaibo	Argentina	3–0	Júlio Baptista 4'; Ayala 40' (o.g.); Dani Alves 69'

==== Argentina 2011 ====
Date	Stage	Venue	Opponent	Score	Brazil scorers
3 July 2011	Group B	Estadio Ciudad de La Plata, La Plata	Venezuela	0–0	
9 July 2011	Group B	Estadio Mario Alberto Kempes, Córdoba	Paraguay	2–2	Jádson 38'; Fred 89'
13 July 2011	Group B	Estadio Mario Alberto Kempes, Córdoba	Ecuador	4–2	Pato 28', 61'; Neymar 48', 71'
First in group, progressed
17 July 2011	Quarter-finals	Estadio Ciudad de La Plata, La Plata	Paraguay	0–0; Penalties; 0–2	Lucas Leiva (red card) 103'; Penalties; Elano (penalty missed); Thiago Silva (penalty missed); André Santos (penalty missed); Fred (penalty missed)

==== Chile 2015 ====
Date	Stage	Venue	Opponent	Score	Brazil scorers
14 June 2015	Group C	Estadio Municipal Germán Becker, Temuco	Peru	2–1	Neymar 4'; Douglas Costa 90+1'
17 June 2015	Group C	Estadio Monumental David Arellano, Santiago	Colombia	0–1	Neymar (red card) 90+4'
21 June 2015	Group C	Estadio Monumental David Arellano, Santiago	Venezuela	2–1	Thiago Silva 8'; Firmino 51'
First in group, progressed
27 June 2015	Quarter-finals	Estadio Municipal de Concepción, Concepción	Paraguay	1–1; Penalties; 3–4	Robinho 14'; Penalties; Fernandinho (penalty scored); Éverton Ribeiro (penalty missed); Miranda (penalty scored); Douglas Costa (penalty missed); Coutinho (penalty scored)

==== United States 2016 ====
Date	Stage	Venue	Opponent	Score	Brazil scorers
4 June 2016	Group B	Rose Bowl, Pasadena	Ecuador	0–0	
8 June 2016	Group B	Camping World Stadium, Orlando	Haiti	7–1	Coutinho 14', 29', 90+2'; Renato Augusto 35', 86'; Gabriel Barbosa 59'; Lucas Lima 67'
12 June 2016	Group B	Gillette Stadium, Foxborough	Peru	0–1	
Third in group, eliminated

==== Brazil 2019 ====
Date	Stage	Venue	Opponent	Score	Brazil scorers
14 June 2019	Group A	Estádio do Morumbi, São Paulo	Bolivia	3–0	Coutinho 50' (pen.), 53'; Everton 85'
18 June 2019	Group A	Itaipava Arena Fonte Nova, Salvador	Venezuela	0–0	
22 June 2019	Group A	Arena Corinthians, São Paulo	Peru	5–0	Casemiro 12'; Firmino 19'; Everton 32'; Dani Alves 53'; Willian 90'
First in group, progressed
27 June 2019	Quarter-finals	Arena do Grêmio, Porto Alegre	Paraguay	0–0; Penalties; 4–3	Penalties; Willian (penalty scored); Marquinhos (penalty scored); Coutinho (penalty scored); Firmino (penalty missed); Gabriel Jesus (penalty scored)
2 July 2019	Semi-finals	Estádio Mineirão, Belo Horizonte	Argentina	2–0	Gabriel Jesus 19'; Firmino 71'
7 July 2019	Final	Estádio do Maracanã, Rio de Janeiro	Peru	3–1	Everton 15'; Gabriel Jesus 45+3'; Richarlison 90' (pen.)

==== Brazil 2021 ====
Date	Stage	Venue	Opponent	Score	Brazil scorers
13 June 2021	Group B	Estádio Mané Garrincha, Brasília	Venezuela	3–0	Marquinhos 23'; Neymar 64' (pen.); Gabriel Barbosa 89'
17 June 2021	Group B	Estádio Engenhão, Rio de Janeiro	Peru	4–0	Alex Sandro 12'; Neymar 68'; Éverton Ribeiro 89'; Richarlison 90+3'
23 June 2021	Group B	Estádio Engenhão, Rio de Janeiro	Colombia	2–1	Firmino 78'; Casemiro 90+10'
27 June 2021	Group B	Estádio Olímpico Pedro Ludovico, Goiânia	Ecuador	1–1	Militão 37'
First in group, progressed
2 July 2021	Quarter-finals	Estádio Engenhão, Rio de Janeiro	Chile	1–0	Paquetá 46'; Gabriel Jesus (red card) 48'
5 July 2021	Semi-finals	Estádio Engenhão, Rio de Janeiro	Peru	1–0	Paquetá 35'
10 July 2021	Final	Estádio do Maracanã, Rio de Janeiro	Argentina	0–1	

==== United States 2024 ====
Date	Stage	Venue	Opponent	Score	Brazil scorers
24 June 2024	Group D	SoFi Stadium, Inglewood	Costa Rica	0–0	
28 June 2024	Group D	Allegiant Stadium, Las Vegas	Paraguay	4–1	Vinícius Júnior 35', 45+5'; Savinho 43'; Paquetá 65' (pen.)
2 July 2024	Group D	Levi's Stadium, Santa Clara	Colombia	1–1	Raphinha 12'
Second in group, progressed
6 July 2024	Quarter-finals	Allegiant Stadium, Las Vegas	Uruguay	0–0; Penalties; 2–4	Penalties; Militão (penalty missed); Andreas Pereira (penalty scored); Douglas Luiz (penalty missed); Martinelli (penalty scored)

=== Panamerican Championship ===
==== Chile 1952 ====
Date	Stage	Venue	Opponent	Score	Brazil scorers
6 April 1952	Final round	Estadio Nacional de Chile, Santiago	Mexico	2–0	Baltazar 55', 71'
10 April 1952	Final round	Estadio Nacional de Chile, Santiago	Peru	0–0	
13 April 1952	Final round	Estadio Nacional de Chile, Santiago	Panama	5–0	Baltazar 5'; Rodrigues 8', 58'; Julinho 21'; Pinga 75'
16 April 1952	Final round	Estadio Nacional de Chile, Santiago	Uruguay	4–2	Didi 24'; Baltazar 25'; Pinga 40'; Rodrigues 66'
20 April 1952	Final round	Estadio Nacional de Chile, Santiago	Chile	3–0	Ademir 9', 18'; Pinga 86'

==== Mexico 1956 ====
Date	Stage	Venue	Opponent	Score	Brazil scorers
1 March 1956	Final round	Estadio Olímpico Universitario, Mexico City	Chile	2–1	Luizinho 13'; Raul Klein 67'
6 March 1956	Final round	Estadio Olímpico Universitario, Mexico City	Peru	1–0	Larry 41'
8 March 1956	Final round	Estadio Olímpico Universitario, Mexico City	Mexico	2–1	Bodinho 17'; Bravo 73' (o.g.)
13 March 1956	Final round	Estadio Olímpico Universitario, Mexico City	Costa Rica	7–1	Larry 7', 37', 51', 74'; Chinesinho 12', 33', 62'
18 March 1956	Final round	Estadio Olímpico Universitario, Mexico City	Argentina	2–2	Chinesinho 24'; Ênio Andrade 58'

==== Costa Rica 1960 ====
Date	Stage	Venue	Opponent	Score	Brazil scorers
6 March 1960	Final round	Estadio Nacional de Costa Rica, San José	Mexico	2–2	Élton 17' (pen.); Gilberto Andrade 65'
10 March 1960	Final round	Estadio Nacional de Costa Rica, San José	Costa Rica	0–3	
13 March 1960	Final round	Estadio Nacional de Costa Rica, San José	Argentina	1–2	Juarez Teixeira 60'
15 March 1960	Final round	Estadio Nacional de Costa Rica, San José	Mexico	2–1	Alfeu 5'; Mengálvio 34'
17 March 1960	Final round	Estadio Nacional de Costa Rica, San José	Costa Rica	4–0	Juarez Teixeira 20', 30'; Élton 87', 90'
20 March 1960	Final round	Estadio Nacional de Costa Rica, San José	Argentina	1–0	Kuelle 65'

=== CONCACAF Gold Cup ===
==== United States 1996 ====
Date	Stage	Venue	Opponent	Score	Brazil scorers
12 January 1996	Group B	Los Angeles Memorial Coliseum, Los Angeles	Canada	4–1	André Luiz 3'; Caio 7'; Sávio 14'; Leandro Machado 86'
14 January 1996	Group B	Los Angeles Memorial Coliseum, Los Angeles	Honduras	5–0	Caio 9', 81'; Jamelli 31', 61'; Sávio 80'
First in group, progressed
18 January 1996	Semi-finals	Los Angeles Memorial Coliseum, Los Angeles	United States	1–0	Balboa 79' (o.g.)
21 January 1996	Final	Los Angeles Memorial Coliseum, Los Angeles	Mexico	0–2	

==== United States 1998 ====
Date	Stage	Venue	Opponent	Score	Brazil scorers
3 February 1998	Group A	Orange Bowl, Miami	Jamaica	0–0	
5 February 1998	Group A	Orange Bowl, Miami	Guatemala	1–1	Romário 79'
8 February 1998	Group A	Los Angeles Memorial Coliseum, Los Angeles	El Salvador	4–0	Edmundo 7'; Romário 19'; Élber 87', 90'
Second in group, progressed
10 February 1998	Semi-finals	Los Angeles Memorial Coliseum, Los Angeles	United States	0–1	
15 February 1998	Third place match	Los Angeles Memorial Coliseum, Los Angeles	Jamaica	1–0	Romário 77'

==== United States/Mexico 2003 ====
Date	Stage	Venue	Opponent	Score	Brazil scorers
13 July 2003	Group A	Estadio Azteca, Mexico City	Mexico	0–1	
15 July 2003	Group A	Estadio Azteca, Mexico City	Honduras	2–1	Maicon 16'; Diego 84'
Second in group, progressed
19 July 2003	Quarter-finals	Orange Bowl, Miami	Colombia	2–0	Kaká 42', 66'
23 July 2003	Semi-finals	Orange Bowl, Miami	United States	2–1 (a.e.t.)	Kaká 89'; Diego 100' (pen.)
27 July 2003	Final	Estadio Azteca, Mexico City	Mexico	0–1 (a.e.t.)	

=== Football at the Summer Olympics ===
==== Helsinki 1952 ====
Date	Stage	Venue	Opponent	Score	Brazil scorers
16 July 1952	Preliminary round	Kupittaa Stadion, Turku	Netherlands	5–1	Humberto Tozzi 25'; Larry 33' (pen.), 36'; Jansen 81'; Vavá 86'
20 July 1952	First round	Kotkan Urheilukeskus, Kotka	Luxembourg	2–1	Larry 42'; Humberto Tozzi 49'
24 July 1952	Quarter-finals	Olympic Stadium, Helsinki	Germany	2–4 (a.e.t.)	Larry 12'; Zózimo 74'

==== Rome 1960 ====
Date	Stage	Venue	Opponent	Score	Brazil scorers
26 August 1960	Group B	Stadio Armando Picchi, Livorno	Great Britain	4–3	Gérson 2'; China 61', 72'; Wanderley 64'
29 August 1960	Group B	Stadio Flaminio, Rome	Taiwan	5–0	Gérson 13', 16', 47'; Roberto Dias 73', 87'
1 September 1960	Group B	Stadio Comunale, Florence	Italy	1–3	Waldir 4'
Second in group, eliminated

==== Tokyo 1964 ====
Date	Stage	Venue	Opponent	Score	Brazil scorers
12 October 1964	Group C	Komazawa Olympic Park, Tokyo	United Arab Republic	1–1	Roberto Miranda 10'
14 October 1964	Group C	Mitsuzawa Field, Yokohama	South Korea	4–0	Zé Roberto 30'; Elizeu 44', 54'; Roberto Miranda 73'
16 October 1964	Group C	Omiya Stadium, Saitama	Czechoslovakia	0–1	
Third in group, eliminated

==== Mexico City 1968 ====
Date	Stage	Venue	Opponent	Score	Brazil scorers
14 October 1968	Group B	Estadio Azteca, Mexico City	Spain	0–1	
16 October 1968	Group B	Estadio Cuauhtémoc, Puebla	Japan	1–1	Ferretti 9'
18 October 1968	Group B	Estadio Cuauhtémoc, Puebla	Nigeria	3–3	Ferretti 50'; Olumodeji 59' (o.g.); Tião 65'
Third in group, eliminated

==== Munich 1972 ====
Date	Stage	Venue	Opponent	Score	Brazil scorers
27 August 1972	Group C	Dreiflüssestadion, Passau	Denmark	2–3	Dirceu 68'; Zé Carlos 69'
29 August 1972	Group C	Olympic Stadium, Munich	Hungary	2–2	Pedrinho 67'; Dirceu 73'
31 August 1972	Group C	Jahnstadion, Regensburg	Iran	0–2	
Fourth in group, eliminated

==== Montreal 1976 ====
Date	Stage	Venue	Opponent	Score	Brazil scorers
18 July 1976	Group A	Varsity Stadium, Toronto	East Germany	0–0	
20 July 1976	Group A	Olympic Stadium, Montreal	Spain	2–1	Rosemiro 7'; Fraga 47' (pen.)
First in group, progressed
25 July 1976	Quarter finals	Varsity Stadium, Toronto	Israel	4–1	Jarbas 56', 74'; Erivelto 72'; Júnior 88'
27 July 1976	Semi finals	Varsity Stadium, Toronto	Poland	0–2	
29 July 1976	Bronze medal match	Olympic Stadium, Montreal	Soviet Union	0–2	

==== Los Angeles 1984 ====
Date	Stage	Venue	Opponent	Score	Brazil scorers
30 July 1984	Group C	Rose Bowl, Pasadena	Saudi Arabia	3–1	Gilmar Popoca 12'; Silvinho 50'; Dunga 59'
1 August 1984	Group C	Stanford Stadium, Palo Alto	West Germany	1–0	Gilmar Popoca 86'
3 August 1984	Group C	Rose Bowl, Pasadena	Morocco	2–0	Dunga 64'; Kita 70'
First in group, progressed
6 August 1984	Quarter finals	Stanford Stadium, Palo Alto	Canada	1–1 (a.e.t.); Penalties; 4–2	Gilmar Popoca 72' Penalties; Gilmar Popoca (penalty scored); Kita (penalty scored); Ademir (penalty scored); André Luís (penalty scored)
8 August 1984	Semi finals	Stanford Stadium, Palo Alto	Italy	2–1 (a.e.t)	Gilmar Popoca 53'; Ronaldo Silva 95'
11 August 1984	Gold medal match	Rose Bowl, Pasadena	France	0–2	

==== Seoul 1988 ====
Date	Stage	Venue	Opponent	Score	Brazil scorers
18 September 1988	Group D	Hanbat Stadium, Daejeon	Nigeria	4–0	Edmar 59'; Romário 74', 84'; Bebeto 86'
20 September 1988	Group D	Dongdaemun Stadium, Seoul	Australia	3–0	Romário 20', 57', 61'
22 September 1988	Group D	Hanbat Stadium, Daejeon	Yugoslavia	2–1	André Cruz 25'; Bebeto 56'
First in group, progressed
25 September 1988	Quarter finals	Dongdaemun Stadium, Seoul	Argentina	1–0	Geovani 76'
27 September 1988	Semi finals	Olympic Stadium, Seoul	West Germany	1–1 (a.e.t.); Penalties; 3–2	Romário 79' Penalties; João Paulo (penalty scored); Winck (penalty scored); Romário (penalty scored); André Cruz (penalty missed)
1 October 1988	Gold medal match	Olympic Stadium, Seoul	Soviet Union	1–2 (a.e.t)	Romário 29'

==== Atlanta 1996 ====
Date	Stage	Venue	Opponent	Score	Brazil scorers
21 July 1996	Group D	Orange Bowl, Miami	Japan	0–1	
23 July 1996	Group D	Orange Bowl, Miami	Hungary	3–1	Ronaldo 35'; Juninho 61'; Bebeto 84'
25 July 1996	Group D	Orange Bowl, Miami	Nigeria	1–0	Ronaldo 30'
First in group, progressed
28 July 1996	Quarter finals	Orange Bowl, Miami	Ghana	4–2	Duodu 18' (o.g.); Ronaldo 56', 62'; Bebeto 72'
31 July 1996	Semi finals	Sanford Stadium, Athens	Nigeria	3–4 (a.e.t)	Flávio Conceição 1', 38'; Bebeto 28'
2 August 1996	Bronze medal match	Sanford Stadium, Athens	Portugal	5–0	Ronaldo 4'; Flávio Conceição 10'; Bebeto 46', 53', 74'

==== Sydney 2000 ====
Date	Stage	Venue	Opponent	Score	Brazil scorers
14 September 2000	Group D	Brisbane Cricket Ground, Brisbane	Slovakia	3–1	Edu 30'; Cisovský 68' (o.g.); Alex 90+1'
17 September 2000	Group D	Brisbane Cricket Ground, Brisbane	South Africa	1–3	Edu 11'
20 September 2000	Group D	Brisbane Cricket Ground, Brisbane	Japan	1–0	Alex 5'
First in group, progressed
23 September 2000	Quarter-finals	Brisbane Cricket Ground, Brisbane	Cameroon	1–2 (a.e.t)	Ronaldinho 90+4'

==== Beijing 2008 ====
Date	Stage	Venue	Opponent	Score	Brazil scorers
7 August 2008	Group C	Shenyang Olympic Stadium, Shenyang	Belgium	1–0	Hernanes 79'
10 August 2008	Group C	Shenyang Olympic Stadium, Shenyang	New Zealand	5–0	Anderson 3'; Pato 33'; Ronaldinho 55', 61' (pen.); Sóbis 90+3'
13 August 2008	Group C	Qinhuangdao Olympic Sports Center Stadium, Qinhuangdao	China	3–0	Diego 18'; Thiago Neves 69', 73'
First in group, progressed
16 August 2008	Quarter-finals	Shenyang Olympic Stadium, Shenyang	Cameroon	2–0 (a.e.t)	Sóbis 101'; Marcelo 105'
19 August 2008	Semi-finals	Beijing Workers' Stadium, Beijing	Argentina	0–3	
22 August 2008	Bronze medal match	Shanghai Stadium, Shanghai	Belgium	3–0	Diego 27'; Jô 45', 90+2'

==== London 2012 ====
Date	Stage	Venue	Opponent	Score	Brazil scorers
26 July 2012	Group C	Millennium Stadium, Cardiff	Egypt	3–2	Rafael 16'; Leandro Damião 26'; Neymar 30'
29 July 2012	Group C	Old Trafford, Manchester	Belarus	3–1	Pato 15'; Neymar 65'; Oscar 90+3'
1 August 2012	Group C	St James' Park, Newcastle	New Zealand	3–0	Danilo 23'; Leandro Damião 29'; Sandro 52'
First in group, progressed
4 August 2012	Quarter-finals	St James' Park, Newcastle	Honduras	3–2	Leandro Damião 38', 60'; Neymar 50' (pen.)
7 August 2012	Semi-finals	Old Trafford, Manchester	South Korea	3–0	Rômulo 38'; Leandro Damião 57', 64'
11 August	Gold medal match	Wembley, London	Mexico	1–2	Hulk 90+1'

==== Rio de Janeiro 2016 ====
Date	Stage	Venue	Opponent	Score	Brazil scorers
4 August 2016	Group A	Estádio Mané Garrincha, Brasília	South Africa	0–0	
7 August 2016	Group A	Estádio Mané Garrincha, Brasília	Iraq	0–0	
10 August 2016	Group A	Itaipava Arena Fonte Nova, Salvador	Denmark	4–0	Gabriel Barbosa 26', 80'; Gabriel Jesus 40'; Luan 50'
First in group, progressed
13 August 2016	Quarter-finals	Arena Corinthians, São Paulo	Colombia	2–0	Neymar 12'; Luan 83'
17 August 2016	Semi-finals	Estádio do Maracanã, Rio de Janeiro	Honduras	6–0	Neymar 1', 90+1' (pen.); Gabriel Jesus 26', 35'; Marquinhos 51'; Luan 79'
20 August 2016	Gold medal match	Estádio do Maracanã, Rio de Janeiro	Germany	1–1 (a.e.t.); Penalties; 5–4	Neymar 27' Penalties; Renato Augusto (penalty scored); Marquinhos (penalty scored); Rafinha (penalty scored); Luan (penalty scored); Neymar (penalty scored)

==== Tokyo 2020 ====
Date	Stage	Venue	Opponent	Score	Brazil scorers
22 July 2021	Group D	International Stadium, Yokohama	Germany	4–2	Richarlison 7', 22', 30'; Paulinho 90+5'
25 July 2021	Group D	International Stadium, Yokohama	Ivory Coast	0–0	
28 July 2021	Group D	Saitama Stadium, Saitama	Saudi Arabia	3–1	Cunha 14'; Richarlison 76', 90+1'
First in group, progressed
31 July 2021	Quarter-finals	Saitama Stadium, Saitama	Egypt	1–0	Cunha 37'
3 August 2021	Semi-finals	Kashima Soccer Stadium, Kashima	Mexico	0–0 (a.e.t.); Penalties; 4–1	Penalties; Dani Alves (penalty scored); Martinelli (penalty scored); Bruno Guimarães (penalty scored); Reinier (penalty scored)
7 August 2021	Gold medal match	International Stadium, Yokohama	Spain	2–1 (a.e.t.)	Cunha 45+2'; Malcom 108'

=== Football at the Pan-American Games ===
==== Chicago 1959 ====
Date	Stage	Venue	Opponent	Score	Brazil scorers
29 August 1959	Final round	Soldier Field, Chicago	Costa Rica	4–2	Beyruth 25'; China 33', 78'; Roberto Rodrigues 80'
30 August 1959	Final round	Soldier Field, Chicago	Cuba	4–0	Gérson 2' (pen.), 4'; Roberto Rodrigues 55'; Beyruth
31 August 1959	Final round	Hanson Field, Macomb	United States	3–5	Gérson 16'; Roberto Rodrigues 19'; Germano 62'
2 September 1959	Final round	Soldier Field, Chicago	Haiti	9–1	Germano 2', 52', 65'; China 18', 44', 54', 63'; Roberto Rodrigues 57'; Maranhão 69'
3 September 1959	Final round	Soldier Field, Chicago	Mexico	6–2	China 20', 40', 70'; Gérson 48', 52', 86'
5 September 1959	Final round	Hanson Field, Macomb	Argentina	1–1	China 38'

==== São Paulo 1963 ====
Date	Stage	Venue	Opponent	Score	Brazil scorers
24 April 1963	Final round	Parque São Jorge, São Paulo	Uruguay	3–1	Othon 7'; Aírton 12', 89'
28 April 1963	Final round	Parque São Jorge, São Paulo	United States	10–0	Othon 6'; Aírton 10', 47', 57', 62', 65', 76', 87'; Nenê 35'; Jairzinho 40'
30 April 1963	Final round	Parque São Jorge, São Paulo	Chile	3–0	Jairzinho 9'; Othon 26'; Aírton 60'
4 May 1963	Final round	Parque São Jorge, São Paulo	Argentina	2–2	Aírton 60'; Othon 75'

==== Mexico City 1975 ====
Date	Stage	Venue	Opponent	Score	Brazil scorers
14 October 1975	Group 4	Estadio Azteca, Mexico City	Costa Rica	3–1	Vázquez 23' (o.g.); Tiquinho 54'; Cláudio Adão 70'
15 October 1975	Group 4	Estadio Azteca, Mexico City	El Salvador	2–0	Cláudio Adão 14'; Edinho 69'
17 October 1975	Group 4	Estadio Azteca, Mexico City	Nicaragua	14–0	Luiz Alberto 1', 3', 16', 32'; Santos 5', 34'; Rosemiro 21'; Eudes 24'; Erivelto 30'; Fraga 59'; Batista 67', 74'; Marcelo Oliveira 72', 90'
First in group, progressed
19 October 1975	Group B	Estadio Azteca, Mexico City	Bolivia	6–0	Leguelé 16' (pen.); Cláudio Adão 37', 46', 86', 89'; Erivelto 90+1'
21 October 1975	Group B	Estadio Azteca, Mexico City	Argentina	0–0	
23 October 1975	Group B	Estadio Azteca, Mexico City	Trinidad and Tobago	7–0	Cláudio Adão 4', 40', 62'; Erivelto 15'; Santos 17', 84'; Eudes 18'
First in group, progressed
25 October 1975	Gold medal match	Estadio Azteca, Mexico City	Mexico	1–1 (a.e.t.)	Cláudio Adão 85' (pen.)

==== San Juan 1979 ====
Date	Stage	Venue	Opponent	Score	Brazil scorers
2 July 1979	Group 2	Estadio Sixto Escobar, San Juan	Guatemala	2–0	Silva 14'; Mica 71'
6 July 1979	Group 2	Estadio Sixto Escobar, San Juan	Cuba	1–0	Cristóvão 69'
First in group, progressed
8 July 1979	Group A	Estadio Country Club, San Juan	Costa Rica	3–1	Silvinho 35'; Édson Boaro 40'; Jérson 44'
10 July 1979	Group A	Estadio Country Club, San Juan	Puerto Rico	5–0	Silva 5', 60'; Mica 21'; Cléo 40'; Jérson 65'
First in group, progressed
14 July 1979	Gold medal match	Estadio Sixto Escobar, San Juan	Cuba	3–0	Wagner Basílio 3'; Silva 38'; Gilcimar 80'

==== Caracas 1983 ====
Date	Stage	Venue	Opponent	Score	Brazil scorers
15 August 1983	Group B	Estadio Brígido Iriarte, Caracas	Argentina	2–0	Marcus Vinícius 27'; Heitor 36'
19 August 1983	Group B	Estadio Brígido Iriarte, Caracas	Mexico	1–0	Heitor 2'
First in group, progressed
23 August 1983	Gold medal match	Estadio Brígido Iriarte, Caracas	Uruguay	0–1	

==== Indianapolis 1987 ====
Date	Stage	Venue	Opponent	Score	Brazil scorers
10 August 1987	Group B	Kuntz Memorial Soccer Stadium, Indianapolis	Canada	4–1	Evair 12'; Nelsinho 36'; Tony 67' (o.g.); João Paulo 69'
13 August 1987	Group B	Kuntz Memorial Soccer Stadium, Indianapolis	Cuba	3–1	Careca 14'; André Cruz 69'; Washington 85'
16 August 1987	Group B	Kuntz Memorial Soccer Stadium, Indianapolis	Chile	0–0	
First in group, progressed
18 August 1987	Semi-finals	Kuntz Memorial Soccer Stadium, Indianapolis	Mexico	1–0 (a.e.t.)	Evair 109'
21 August 1987	Gold medal match	Kuntz Memorial Soccer Stadium, Indianapolis	Chile	2–0 (a.e.t.)	Washington 105'; Evair 115'

==== Mar del Plata 1995 ====
Date	Stage	Venue	Opponent	Score	Brazil scorers
8 March 1995	Group B	Estadio Municipal General San Martín, Tandil	Costa Rica	2–1	Ronaldo Guiaro; Silvinho
13 March 1995	Group B	Estadio Municipal General San Martín, Tandil	Bermuda	2–0	Anderson; Sandro
15 March 1995	Group B	Estadio Municipal General San Martín, Tandil	Chile	1–1	Silvinho
First in group, progressed
18 March 1995	Quarter-finals	Estadio José María Minella, Mar del Plata	Honduras	0–0 (a.e.t.); Penalties; 7–8	Penalties Ronaldo Guiaro (penalty scored); Anderson (penalty scored); Bordon (penalty scored); Alberto (penalty missed); Nenê (penalty missed); Ferreira (penalty missed); Edmílson (penalty scored); Fabrício (penalty scored); Silvinho (penalty scored); Sandro (penalty scored); Adílson (penalty missed)

==== Santo Domingo 2003 ====
Date	Stage	Venue	Opponent	Score	Brazil scorers
3 August 2003	Group B	Estadio Mirador Este, Santo Domingo	Colombia	4–0	Vágner Love 30', 41'; Gabriel 34'; Coelho 65'
6 August 2003	Group B	Estadio Mirador Este, Santo Domingo	Dominican Republic	5–0	Dagoberto 5', 22'; Diego 63'; Dudu Cearense 86'; Vágner Love 88'
9 August 2003	Group B	Estadio Mirador Este, Santo Domingo	Cuba	2–1	William Batoré 62'; Vágner Love 64'
First in group, progressed
12 August 2003	Semi-finals	Estadio Olímpico Juan Pablo Duarte, Santo Domingo	Mexico	1–0	Dagoberto 87'
12 August 2003	Gold medal match	Estadio Olímpico Juan Pablo Duarte, Santo Domingo	Argentina	0–1	

==== Rio de Janeiro 2007 ====
Date	Stage	Venue	Opponent	Score	Brazil scorers
15 July 2007	Group A	Estádio Engenhão, Rio de Janeiro	Honduras	3–0	Lulinha 22' (pen.), 66', 90+1' (pen.)
18 July 2007	Group A	Estádio Engenhão, Rio de Janeiro	Costa Rica	2–0	Maicon 18'; Alex Teixeira 24'
21 July 2007	Group A	Estádio do Maracanã, Rio de Janeiro	Ecuador	2–4	Luiz Júnior 37'; Alex Teixeira 71'
Second in group, eliminated

==== Guadalajara 2011 ====
Date	Stage	Venue	Opponent	Score	Brazil scorers
19 October 2011	Group B	Estadio Omnilife, Zapopan	Argentina	1–1	Henrique Almeida 63'
21 October 2011	Group B	Estadio Omnilife, Zapopan	Cuba	0–0	
23 October 2011	Group B	Estadio Omnilife, Zapopan	Costa Rica	1–3	Henrique Almeida 30'
Third in group, eliminated

==== Toronto 2015 ====
Date	Stage	Venue	Opponent	Score	Brazil scorers
12 July 2015	Group A	Hamilton Pan Am Soccer Stadium, Hamilton	Canada	4–1	Luciano 7'; Rômulo 38'; Clayton 47'; Erik 89'
16 July 2015	Group A	Hamilton Pan Am Soccer Stadium, Hamilton	Peru	4–0	Luan 3'; Clayton 20'; Rômulo 26'; Dodô 30'
20 July 2015	Group A	Hamilton Pan Am Soccer Stadium, Hamilton	Panama	3–3	Luciano 24', 25'; Clayton 37'
First in group, progressed
23 July 2015	Semi-finals	Hamilton Pan Am Soccer Stadium, Hamilton	Uruguay	1–2	Clayton 75'
25 July 2015	Bronze medal match	Hamilton Pan Am Soccer Stadium, Hamilton	Panama	3–1 (a.e.t.)	Luciano 76' (pen.), 115' (pen.); Lucas Piazon 99'

==== Santiago 2023 ====
Date	Stage	Venue	Opponent	Score	Brazil scorers
23 October 2023	Group B	Estadio Elías Figueroa Brander, Valparaíso	United States	1–0	Miranda 86'
26 October 2023	Group B	Estadio Sausalito, Viña del Mar	Colombia	2–0	Biro 16'; Pirani 51'
29 October 2023	Group B	Estadio Sausalito, Viña del Mar	Honduras	3–0	Ronald 50'; Martins 54'; Lara 79'
First in group, progressed
1 November 2023	Semi-finals	Estadio Sausalito, Viña del Mar	Mexico	1–0	Leone 2' (o.g.)
4 November 2023	Gold medal match	Estadio Sausalito, Viña del Mar	Chile	1–1 (a.e.t.); Penalties; 4–2	Ronald 83'; Penalties; Nascimento (penalty scored); Ronald (penalty scored); Figueiredo (penalty missed); Miranda (penalty scored); Mycael (penalty scored)
