= 1956 Panamerican Championship =

Tournament details
- Country: Mexico
- Venue: Estadio Olímpico Universitario
- Dates: 26 February – 18 March
- Teams: 6

Final positions
- Champions: Brazil (2nd title)
- Runners-up: Argentina
- Third place: Costa Rica
- Fourth place: Peru

Tournament statistics
- Matches played: 15
- Goals scored: 49 (3.27 per match)
- Top goal scorer(s): (Argentina) Omar Sívori (5 goals)

The 1956 Panamerican Championship was the second edition of the Panamerican Championship, an international football tournament featuring national teams from North, Central and South America. It was held in Mexico City, between February 26 and March 18, in 1956.

The competition was contested by six teams, and was played in a round-robin format. All the matches were held at Estadio Olímpico Universitario. Brazil, represented solely by Campeonato Gaúcho players, won their second consecutive title.

== Teams ==
6 teams participated in the championship, qualifying by various means:

Confederation	Team	Qualification Path
Host	Mexico	Tournament organizer
Conmebol (South America)	Brazil; Argentina; Chile; Peru	Champion of 1952 Panamerican Championship; Champion of 1955 South American Championship; Runner-up 1955 South American Championship; Third place 1955 South American Championship
CCCF (Central America and the Caribbean)	Costa Rica	Champion of 1955 CCCF Championship

== Venue ==
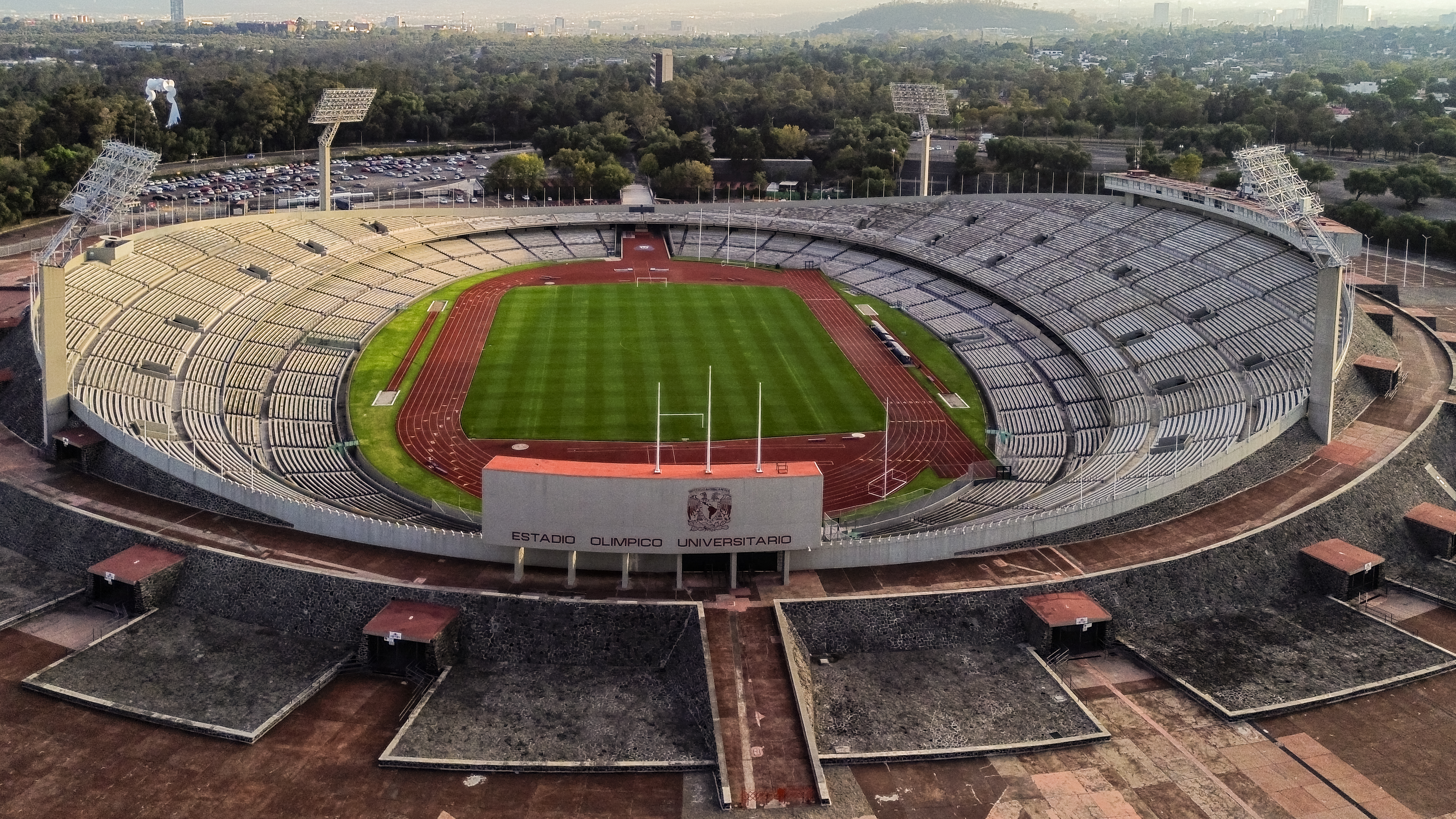
Estadio Olímpico Universitario

All the matches were held in University Olympic Stadium (Spanish: Estadio Olímpico Universitario) is a multi-purpose stadium located inside Ciudad Universitaria in Mexico City. It was built in 1952 and at that time was the largest stadium in Mexico.

By the time of the tournament, the stadium had a capacity of 69,000. The first major event held in the stadium was the 1955 Pan American Games. During the 1950s and the 1960s this stadium was used mostly for college American football games. It then became the Olympic Stadium for the 1968 Summer Games.

The stadium was also one of the venues of the 1968 Summer Olympics. It was the location of the track and field competitions, equestrian events, certain association football matches, the arrival of the marathon and the opening and closing ceremonies.

== Referees ==
- (Argentina) Alfredo Rossi
- (Brazil) Alberto Da Gama
- (Chile) Claudio Vicuña
- (Costa Rica) Danilo Alfaro
- (Mexico) Frenando Buergo

== Matches ==
26 February

Mexico	1–1	Costa Rica
Calderón 40'	Report	Monge 57'

Estadio Olímpico Universitario, Mexico City

28 February

Argentina	0–0	Peru
	Report

Estadio Olímpico Universitario, Mexico City

1 March

Brazil	2–1	Chile
Luizinho 13'; Klein 67'	Report	Tello 71'

Estadio Olímpico Universitario, Mexico City

4 March

Mexico	0–2	Peru
	Report	Drago 26'; Gómez Sánchez 71'

Estadio Olímpico Universitario, Mexico City

6 March

Argentina	4–3	Costa Rica
Maschio 27'; Sívori 60', 79', 85'	Report	Montero 3'; Vairo 42' (o.g.); Monge 48'

Estadio Olímpico Universitario, Mexico City

6 March

Brazil	1–0	Peru
Larry 41'	Report

Estadio Olímpico Universitario, Mexico City

8 March

Costa Rica	2–1	Chile
Herrera 28'; Monge 35'	Report	Hormazábal 71'

Estadio Olímpico Universitario, Mexico City

8 March

Brazil	2–1	Mexico
Bodinho 17'; Bravo 73' (o.g.)	Report	del Águila 56'

Estadio Olímpico Universitario, Mexico City

11 March

Argentina	3–0	Chile
Maschio 38', 65'; Sívori 50'	Report

Estadio Olímpico Universitario, Mexico City

11 March

Brazil	7–1	Costa Rica
Larry 7', 37', 51'; Chinesinho 12', 63', 83'; Bodinho 74'	Report	Cordero 53'

Estadio Olímpico Universitario, Mexico City

13 March

Mexico	0–0	Argentina
	Report

Estadio Olímpico Universitario, Mexico City

13 March

Peru	2–2	Chile
Lama 23'; Mosquera 73'	Report	Díaz 18'; Cortés 85'

Estadio Olímpico Universitario, Mexico City

17 March

Costa Rica	4–2	Peru
Murillo 17', 84'; Herrera 42' Monge 43'	Report	Salinas 55', 69'

Estadio Olímpico Universitario, Mexico City

18 March

Mexico	2–1	Chile
Calderón 4', 79'	Report	Tello 38'

Estadio Olímpico Universitario, Mexico City

18 March

Brazil	2–2	Argentina
Chinesinho 24'; Andrade 58'	Report	Yudica 36'; Sívori 85'

Estadio Olímpico Universitario, Mexico City

1956 Panamerican Championship

Brazil
2nd title

== Final table ==
Rank	Team	Pts	Pld	W	D	L	GF	GA	GD
1	Brazil	9	5	4	1	0	14	5	9
2	Argentina	7	5	2	3	0	9	5	4
3	Costa Rica	5	5	2	1	2	11	15	–4
4	Peru	4	5	1	2	2	6	7	–1
5	Mexico	4	5	1	2	2	4	6	–2
6	Chile	1	5	0	1	4	5	11	–6

== Top goalscorers ==
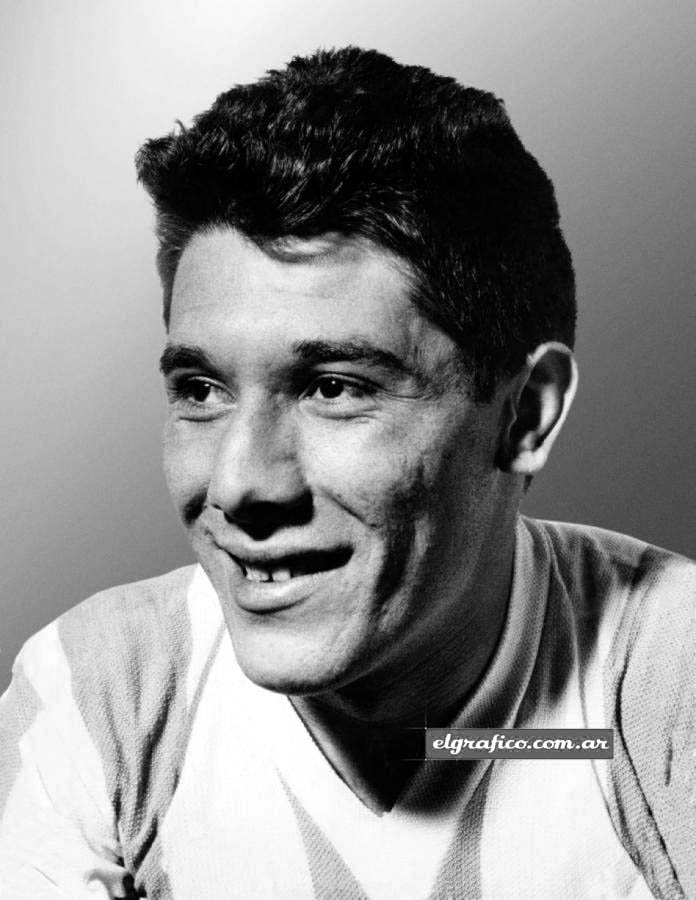
Enrique Omar Sívori, top scorer with 5 goals

There were 49 goals scored in 15 matches, for an average of 3.27 goals per match.

5 goals

- (Argentina) Omar Sívori

4 goals

- (Brazil) Chinesinho
- (Brazil) Larry

3 goals

- (Argentina) Humberto Maschio

Source: RSSSF
