= Teté =

Brazilian footballer and manager

Personal information
- Full name: José Francisco Duarte Júnior

Senior career*
Years	Team	Apps	(Gls)
1930–1933	Botafogo		
1933–1935	9º Regimento		

Managerial career
- 1935–1938: 9º Regimento
- 1940–1943: Brasil de Pelotas
- 1944–1945: Farroupilha
- 1946: Brasil de Pelotas
- 1947: Cruzeiro (RS)
- 1947–1951: Nacional (RS)
- 1951–1957: Internacional
- 1956: Brazil
- 1958–1959: São José (RS)
- 1960: Internacional
- * Club domestic league appearances and goals

Teté (24 August 1907 – 18 June 1962) was a Brazilian football manager who coached Brazil national team for some games in 1956. He also coached Sport Club Internacional during the 1950s.

== Biography ==
Teté was a major coach of football in Rio Grande do Sul. Became known as the "Marshal of Victories," because he was an officer of the Army Reserve.

As a player, he served in the 9º Regimento. Then trained the Farroupilha (after the change of club name), Brasil de Pelotas, Guarany of Bagé, General Osorio Cruzeiro-RS Nacional-RS and Internacional .

In Internacional, Teté did well. He coached the team from 1951 to 1957 and was four-time Gaucho (51, 52, 53 and 55). Also coached Brazil national team, became champion of the Pan American of 1956 in Mexico.
