= Larry (footballer) =

Brazilian footballer (1932–2016)

Personal information
- Full name: Larry Pinto de Faria
- Date of birth: 3 November 1932
- Place of birth: Nova Friburgo, Brazil
- Date of death: 6 May 2016 (aged 83)

Senior career*
Years	Team	Apps	(Gls)
1951–1954	Fluminense		
1954–1962	Internacional		

International career
1952	Brazil Olympic	3	(4)
1956	Brazil	6	(4)
- * Club domestic league appearances and goals

Larry Pinto de Faria (3 November 1932 – 6 May 2016) was a Brazilian football player.

== Early life ==
He was born in Nova Friburgo, Rio de Janeiro. He later lived in Porto Alegre.

== Career ==
He began his career at Fluminense Football Club where he played from 1951 to 1954, and champion of Campeonato Carioca in 1951 and the Copa Rio (International) in 1952, that year he was also the top scorer of the Brazilian team in the 1952 Summer Olympics, when he scored four goals in three games. With Bodinho he formed the most invaluable double striker attack of Internacional.

Larry competed for Brazil at the 1952 Summer Olympics.

== Clubs ==
- Fluminense, 1951–1954
- Internacional, 1954–1961

== Honours ==
- Campeonato Gaúcho: 1955 and 1961
- Panamerican Championship: 1956, with Brazil national football team.
