= Raul Klein =

Brazilian footballer (1932–1998)

Personal information
- Full name: Raul Otávio Klein
- Date of birth: 27 September 1932
- Place of birth: Novo Hamburgo, Brazil
- Date of death: 10 June 1998 (aged 65)
- Place of death: Novo Hamburgo, Brazil
- Position: Left winger

Youth career
- Floriano

Senior career*
Years	Team	Apps	(Gls)
1949	Floriano		
1950–1952	Fluminense		
1953–1957	Floriano		
1957–1960	Portuguesa	108	(42)
1961	Rapid Wien		

International career
1956	Brazil	3	(1)
- * Club domestic league appearances and goals

Raul Otávio Klein (27 September 1932 – 10 June 1998) was a Brazilian professional footballer who played as a left winger.

== Career ==
Born in Novo Hamburgo, Klein began his career at Floriano (currently EC Novo Hamburgo), where he played most of his career. He had a brief spell at Fluminense but did not establish himself. In 1957 he arrived at Portuguesa where he made 108 appearances and scored 42 goals.

For the Brazil national team, he was part of the winning squad of the 1956 Panamerican Championship, playing three matches and scoring one goal.

== Honours ==
Brazil

- Panamerican Championship: 1956
