= Bodinho =

Brazilian footballer (1928-2007)

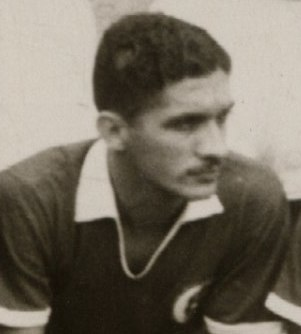
Nílton Coelho da Costa

Nílton Coelho da Costa, best known as Bodinho, (June 16, 1928 in Recife – September 22, 2007 in Porto Alegre) was a Brazilian football player. With Larry Pinto de Faria formed the most invaluable attacking duo of Internacional. He started career for Internacional in 1951.

== Clubs ==
- Íbis: 1943
- Sampaio Corrêa: 1944
- Flamengo: 1945–1949
- Nacional (RS): 1950–1951
- Internacional: 1951–1958

== Honours ==
- Campeonato Gaúcho: five times (1950, 1951, 1952, 1953, and 1955).
- Panamerican Championship: 1956, with Brazil national football team.
