= Carlos Calderón (footballer, born 1934) =

Mexican footballer (1934–2012)

Personal information
- Full name: Carlos Calderón de la Barca Perea
- Date of birth: 2 October 1934
- Place of birth: Mexico City, Mexico
- Date of death: 15 September 2012 (aged 77)
- Place of death: Puebla, Mexico
- Position: Forward

Senior career*
Years	Team	Apps	(Gls)
1954–1958	Atlante		
1958–1959	Petroleros Poza Rica		
1962	Pumas UNAM		

International career
1956–1958	Mexico	8	(3)
- * Club domestic league appearances and goals

Carlos Calderón de la Barca Perea (2 October 1934 – 15 September 2012) was a Mexican football league forward.

== Career ==
He played on the university team. He played for Mexico in the 1958 FIFA World Cup. He also played for Atlante.
