= Carlos Tello =

Chilean footballer (1929–1965)

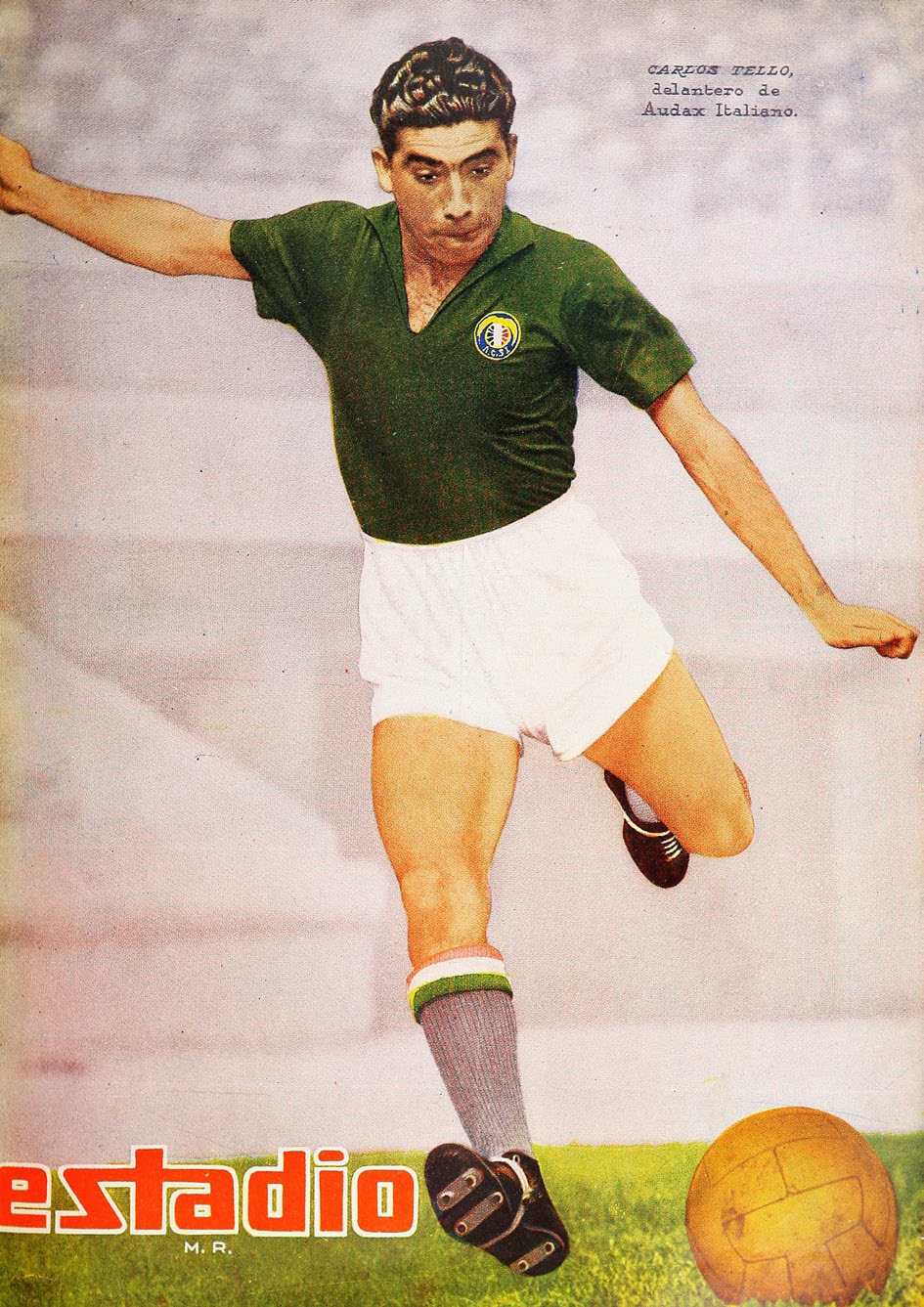
- Estadio, 1951

Personal information
- Full name: Carlos Inocencio Tello Vergara
- Date of birth: 28 March 1929
- Date of death: 8 May 1965 (aged 36)
- Position: Forward

International career
Years	Team	Apps	(Gls)
1952–1957	Chile	14	(1)

Carlos Tello (28 March 1929 – 8 May 1965) was a Chilean footballer. He played in 14 matches for the Chile national football team from 1952 to 1957. He was also part of Chile's squad for the 1957 South American Championship.
