= Sergio Bravo =

Mexican footballer (1926–1997)

Personal information
- Full name: Sergio Bravo Martínez
- Date of birth: 29 November 1926
- Place of birth: Mexico City, Mexico
- Date of death: 9 April 1997 (aged 70)
- Position: Defender

Senior career*
Years	Team	Apps	(Gls)
- Club León

International career
1947–1957	Mexico	11	(0)
- * Club domestic league appearances and goals

Sergio Bravo Martínez (29 November 1926 – 9 April 1997) was a Mexican football defender who was in Mexico's squad for the 1954 FIFA World Cup.

Bravo died on 9 April 1997, at the age of 70.

== Career ==
Bravo was an imposing central defender who played his club football with Club León. He retired from playing in January 1964. A chronicler of the time described him as "one of the strongest central defenders in the country".
