= Football at the 1976 Summer Olympics – Men's team squads =

The following squads were named for the 1976 Summer Olympics tournament.

== Brazil ==
Head coach: Cláudio Coutinho

No.	Pos.	Player	Date of birth	Age	Caps	Club	Tournament games	Tournament goals	Minutes played	Sub off	Sub on	Cards yellow/red
1	GK	Carlos	March 4, 1956	20	35	(Brazil) Ponte Preta	5	0	437	1	0
2	DF	Rosemiro	February 22, 1954	22	?	(Brazil) Palmeiras	4	1	246	1	2	1 Yellow
3	DF	Tecão	May 10, 1952	24	?	(Brazil) São Paulo	4	0	332	0	1
4	DF	Edinho	June 5, 1955	21	56	(Brazil) Fluminense	5	0	450	0	0	2 Yellow
5	DF	Júnior	June 29, 1954	22	88	(Brazil) Flamengo	4	1	360	0	0
6	MF	Alberto Leguelé	February 28, 1953	23	?	(Brazil) Bahia	4	0	304	0	1
7	MF	Marinho	May 23, 1957	19	?	(Brazil) Santos FC	4	0	318	2	0	1 Yellow
8	MF	Batista	March 8, 1955	21	38	(Brazil) Internacional	5	0	450	0	0
9	MF	Eudes	April 8, 1955	21	?	(Brazil) Portuguesa	3	0	214	3	0
10	MF	Erivelto	July 10, 1954	22	?	(Brazil) Fluminense	5	1	450	0	0
11	MF	Santos	July 07, 1957	19	?	(Brazil) Santa Cruz	4	0	172	0	1
12	DF	Mauro Cabeção	April 23, 1955	21	?	(Brazil) Guarani	4	0	299	1	0
13	FW	Júlio César	March 3, 1956	20	?	(Brazil) Flamengo	1	0	172	1	0
14	FW	Chico Fraga	October 2, 1954	21	?	(Brazil) Internacional	4	1	360	0	0	1 Yellow
15	FW	Jarbas	September 17, 1957	18	?	(Brazil) America (RJ)	5	2	154	0	4
16	FW	Edval	February 17, 1954	22	?	(Brazil) Campo Grande	2	0	118	1	0
17	GK	Zé Carlos	April 29, 1955	21	?	(Brazil) Botafogo	1	0	13	0	1

== Canada ==
Head coach: Colin Morris

No.	Pos.	Player	Date of birth	Age	Caps	Club	Tournament games	Tournament goals	Minutes played	Sub off	Sub on	Cards yellow/red
1	GK	Jack Brand	April 4, 1953	23	?	(Canada) Toronto Italia
2	MF	Bob Bolitho	July 20, 1952	24	?	(Canada) London Boxing Club
3	DF	Ray Telford	November 23, 1946	29	?	(Canada) Nanaimo United
4	DF	Kevin Grant	October 24, 1952	23	?	(Canada) Hamilton Croatia
5	DF	Tony Lawrence	February 2, 1946	30	?	(Canada) Serbian White Eagles
6	MF	Jimmy Douglas	October 6, 1948	27	?	(Canada) St Catharine's Heidelberg
7	FW	John McGrane	October 12, 1953	22	?	(Canada) Simon Fraser University
8	MF	Robin Megraw	August 9, 1950	25	?	(Canada) First Portuguese
9	MF	Carl Rose	November 25, 1952	23	?	(Canada) Toronto Emerald
10	DF	Peter Roe	September 23, 1955	20	?	(Canada) Toronto Italia
11	FW	John Connor	June 8, 1953	23	?	(Canada) New Westminster Blues
12	DF	Mike McLenaghen	June 10, 1950	26	?	(Canada) Pegasus
13	GK	Tino Lettieri	September 27, 1957	18	?	(Canada) Quebec Selects
14	MF	Wes McLeod	October 24, 1957	18	?	(Canada) Coquitlam Blue Mountain
15	DF	Garry Ayre	October 2, 1953	22	?	(Canada) New Westminster Blues
16	FW	Jim McLoughlin	February 5, 1957	19	?	(Canada) Toronto Emerald
17	FW	Ken Whitehead	April 11, 1955	21	?	(Canada) Simon Fraser University

== Cuba ==
Head coach: Sergio Padrón

No.	Pos.	Player	Date of birth	Age	Caps	Club	Tournament games	Tournament goals	Minutes played	Sub off	Sub on	Cards yellow/red
1	GK	José Francisco Reinoso	May 20, 1950	26	?	(Cuba) Azucareros
2	DF	Lorenzo Sotomayor	February 2, 1949	27	?	(Cuba) Granjeros
3	DF	Luis Holmanza	September 12, 1949	26	?	(Cuba) Industriales
4	DF	Antonio Garcés	September 2, 1950	25	?	(Cuba) Granjeros
5	DF	René Bonora	January 21, 1951	25	?	(Cuba) Granjeros
6	MF	José Luis Elejalde	January 1951, 14	25	?	(Cuba) La Habana
7	FW	Andrés Roldán	February 28, 1950	26	?	(Cuba) Azucareros
8	MF	Julio Cepero	May 27, 1953	23	?	(Cuba) La Habana
9	FW	Dagoberto Lara	April 16, 1953	23	?	(Cuba) Azucareros
10	MF	Luis Hernández	August 24, 1949	26	?	(Cuba) La Habana
11	MF	Francisco Farinas	April 2, 1948	28	?	(Cuba) Industriales
12	FW	Roberto Pereira	September 23, 1954	22	?	(Cuba) Azucareros
13	DF	Miguel Rivero	March 14, 1952	26	?	(Cuba) La Habana
14	MF	Regino Delgado	September 7, 1956	20	?	(Cuba) Azucareros
15	FW	Jorge Massó	February 16, 1950	26	?	(Cuba) La Habana
16	GK	Hugo Madera	November 24, 1951	24	?	(Cuba) Granjeros
17	FW	Carlos Loredo	October 14, 1951	24	?	(Cuba) La Habana

== East Germany ==
Head coach: Georg Buschner

No.	Pos.	Player	Date of birth	Age	Caps	Club	Tournament games	Tournament goals	Minutes played	Sub off	Sub on	Cards yellow/red
1	GK	Jürgen Croy	October 19, 1946	29	?	(East Germany) BSG Sachsenring Zwickau
2	DF	Gerd Weber	May 31, 1956	20	?	(East Germany) SG Dynamo Dresden
3	DF	Hans-Jürgen Dörner	January 25, 1951	25	?	(East Germany) SG Dynamo Dresden
4	DF	Konrad Weise	August 17, 1951	24	?	(East Germany) FC Carl Zeiss Jena
5	DF	Lothar Kurbjuweit	November 6, 1950	25	?	(East Germany) FC Carl Zeiss Jena
6	MF	Reinhard Lauck	September 16, 1946	29	?	(East Germany) BFC Dynamo
7	FW	Gert Heidler	January 30, 1948	28	?	(East Germany) SG Dynamo Dresden
8	MF	Reinhard Häfner	February 2, 1952	24	?	(East Germany) SG Dynamo Dresden
9	FW	Hans-Jürgen Riediger	December 20, 1955	20	?	(East Germany) BFC Dynamo
10	MF	Bernd Bransch	September 24, 1944	31	?	(East Germany) Hallescher FC
11	FW	Martin Hoffmann	March 22, 1955	21	?	(East Germany) 1. FC Magdeburg
12	DF	Gerd Kische	October 23, 1951	24	?	(East Germany) Hansa Rostock
13	FW	Wolfram Löwe	May 14, 1945	31	?	(East Germany) 1. FC Lokomotive Leipzig
14	MF	Hartmut Schade	November 13, 1954	22	?	(East Germany) SG Dynamo Dresden
15	FW	Dieter Riedel	September 16, 1947	28	?	(East Germany) SG Dynamo Dresden
16	GK	Hans-Ulrich Grapenthin	September 2, 1943	32	?	(East Germany) FC Carl Zeiss Jena
17	DF	Wilfried Gröbner	December 18, 1949	25	?	(East Germany) 1. FC Lokomotive Leipzig

== France ==
Head coach: Gabriel Robert

No.	Pos.	Player	Date of birth	Age	Caps	Club	Tournament games	Tournament goals	Minutes played	Sub off	Sub on	Cards yellow/red
1	GK	Jean-Claude Larrieu	March 23, 1946	30	?	(France) AS Cannes
2	GK	Henri Orlandini	August 9, 1955	20	?	(France) Nîmes Olympique
3	DF	Patrick Battiston	March 12, 1957	19	?	(France) FC Metz
4	DF	Claude Chazottes	January 7, 1949	27	?	(France) Paris FC
5	DF	Francis Meynieu	January 9, 1953	23	?	(France) FC Girondins de Bordeaux
6	DF	Michel Pottier	January 12, 1948	28	?	(France) Tours FC
7	DF	Alexandre Stassievitch	September 20, 1950	25	?	(France) RC Lens
8	DF	Henri Zambelli	March 9, 1957	29	?	(France) OGC Nice
9	MF	Michel Cougé	June 11, 1954	22	?	(France) Stade Rennais FC
10	MF	Jean Fernandez	October 9, 1954	21	?	(France) Olympique de Marseille
11	MF	Michel Platini	June 21, 1955	21	?	(France) AS Nancy
12	MF	Francisco Rubio	December 6, 1953	22	?	(France) AS Nancy
13	FW	Loïc Amisse	August 9, 1954	21	?	(France) FC Nantes
14	FW	Bruno Baronchelli	January 13, 1957	19	?	(France) FC Nantes
15	FW	Éric Pécout	February 17, 1956	20	?	(France) FC Nantes
16	FW	Olivier Rouyer	December 1, 1955	21	?	(France) AS Nancy
17	FW	Jean-Marc Schaer	January 1, 1953	23	?	(France) AS Saint-Étienne

== Guatemala ==
Head coach: Rubén Amorín

No.	Pos.	Player	Date of birth	Age	Caps	Club	Tournament games	Tournament goals	Minutes played	Sub off	Sub on	Cards yellow/red
1	GK	Julio Rodolfo Garcia	November 23, 1945	30	?	(Guatemala) Tiquisate FC
2	DF	Julio Gómez	October 28, 1954	21	?	(Guatemala) Aurora
3	DF	Carlos Monterroso	July 28, 1948	27	?	(Guatemala) Municipal
4	DF	Luis Villavicencio	February 3, 1950	26	?	(Guatemala) Comunicaciones
5	DF	Allan Wellmann	May 26, 1954	22	?	(Guatemala) Comunicaciones
6	MF	Edgar Bolaños	February 20, 1951	25	?	(Guatemala) Comunicaciones
7	FW	Óscar Enrique Sánchez	July 15, 1955	21	?	(Guatemala) Comunicaciones
8	MF	Benjamín Monterroso	September 1, 1952	23	?	(Guatemala) Municipal
9	FW	Selvin Pennant	January 4, 1950	26	?	(Guatemala) Aurora
10	MF	Jorge Hurtarte	April 23, 1945	31	?	(Guatemala) Aurora
11	FW	René Morales	February 22, 1953	23	?	(Guatemala) Xelajú
12	MF	Marco Fión	January 17, 1947	29	?	(Guatemala) Aurora
13	FW	Julio César Anderson	November 27, 1947	28	?	(Guatemala) Municipal
14	MF	Sergio Rivera	November 28, 1955	20	?	(Guatemala) Comunicaciones
15	FW	Peter Sandoval	April 22, 1947	29	?	(Guatemala) Comunicaciones
16	MF	Felix McDonald	June 26, 1954	22	?	(Guatemala) Comunicaciones
17	GK	Ricardo Piccinini	September 7, 1949	26	?	(Guatemala) Comunicaciones

== Iran ==
Head coach: Heshmat Mohajerani

No.	Pos.	Player	Date of birth	Age	Caps	Club	Tournament games	Tournament goals	Minutes played	Sub off	Sub on	Cards yellow/red
1	GK	Mansour Rashidi	November 12, 1948	28	?	(Iran) Taj
2	DF	Hassan Nazari	August 19, 1956	19	?	(Iran) Taj
3	DF	Andranik Eskandarian	December 31, 1951	24	?	(Iran) Taj
4	DF	Bijan Zolfagharnassab	June 7, 1949	27	?	(Iran) Persepolis
5	MF	Parviz Ghelichkhani	December 4, 1945	30	?	(Iran) Persepolis
6	MF	Ebrahim Ghasempour	September 11, 1957	18	?	(Iran) Shahbaz
7	MF	Ali Parvin	September 25, 1947	28	?	(Iran) Persepolis
8	DF	Nasrollah Abdollahi	September 2, 1951	25	?	(Iran) Shahbaz
9	FW	Nasser Nouraei	June 16, 1954	22	?	(Iran) Homa
10	FW	Hassan Rowshan	December 31, 1956	21	?	(Iran) Taj
11	FW	Alireza Khorshidi	May 16, 1951	25	?	(Iran) Homa
12	MF	Hassan Nayebagha	September 17, 1950	25	?	(Iran) Homa
13	FW	Gholam Hossein Mazloumi	January 13, 1950	26	?	(Iran) Shahbaz
14	DF	Sahameddin Mirfakhraei	February 4, 1951	25	?	(Iran) Homa
15	FW	Ghafour Jahani	June 19, 1951	25	?	(Iran) Malavan
16	MF	Alireza Azizi	January 12, 1950	26	?	(Iran) Persepolis
17	GK	Nasser Hejazi	December 19, 1949	26	?	(Iran) Shahbaz

== Israel ==
Head coach: David Schweitzer

No.	Pos.	Player	Date of birth	Age	Caps	Club	Tournament games	Tournament goals	Minutes played	Sub off	Sub on	Cards yellow/red
1	GK	Yitzhak Vissoker	September 18, 1944	31	?	(Israel) Hapoel Petah Tikva	4
2	DF	Avraham Lev	August 24, 1948	27	?	(Israel) Beitar Tel Aviv	2
3	MF	Yaron Oz	May 10, 1952	24	?	(Israel) Maccabi Tel Aviv	3	1
4	DF	Haim Bar	May 14, 1954	22	4	(Israel) Maccabi Netanya	4
5	MF	Moshe Schweitzer	April 24, 1954	22	?	(Israel) Maccabi Tel Aviv	4
6	FW	Vicky Peretz	February 11, 1953	23	?	(Israel) Maccabi Tel Aviv	4	2
7	MF	Itzhak Shum	September 1, 1948	27	?	(Israel) Hapoel Kfar Saba	4	1
8	DF	Eli Leventhal	March 18, 1953	23	?	(Israel) Hapoel Haifa	4
9	MF	Rifaat Turk	September 16, 1954	21	?	(Israel) Hapoel Tel Aviv	2
10	FW	Gideon Damti	October 31, 1951	24	?	(Israel) Shimshon Tel Aviv	4
11	GK	Yosef Sorinov	May 17, 1946	30	?	(Israel) Hapoel Ramat Gan	0
12	DF	Meir Nimni	September 29, 1948	27	?	(Israel) Maccabi Tel Aviv	4
13	FW	Oded Machnes	June 8, 1956	20	?	(Israel) Maccabi Netanya	2
14	DF	Avi Cohen	November 14, 1956	19	?	(Israel) Maccabi Tel Aviv	3
15	MF	Yehoshua Gal	July 11, 1951	25	?	(Israel) Maccabi Netanya	1
16	FW	Ehud Ben Tuvim	August 12, 1952	23	?	(Israel) Bnei Yehuda	0
17	DF	Alon Ben Dor	March 18, 1952	24	?	(Israel) Hapoel Be'er Sheva	4

== Mexico ==
Head coach: Diego Mercado

No.	Pos.	Player	Date of birth	Age	Caps	Club	Tournament games	Tournament goals	Minutes played	Sub off	Sub on	Cards yellow/red
1	GK	Javier Regalado	December 3, 1955	20	?	(Mexico) Monterrey
2	MF	Gabriel Márquez	February 12, 1956	20	?	(Mexico) Monterrey
3	DF	Eduardo Rergis	April 20, 1956	20	?	(Mexico) América
4	DF	Bardomiano Viveros	January 10, 1955	21	?	(Mexico) Cruz Azul
5	MF	Carlos García	July 3, 1958	18	?	(Mexico) Monterrey
6	DF	Ernesto de la Rosa	September 14, 1955	20	?	(Mexico) Puebla
7	FW	Héctor Tapia	July 11, 1957	19	?	(Mexico) Cruz Azul
8	MF	José Luis Caballero	June 21, 1955	21	?	(Mexico) Cruz Azul
9	FW	Víctor Rangel	March 11, 1957	19	?	(Mexico) Guadalajara
10	FW	Hugo Sánchez	July 11, 1958	18	?	(Mexico) UNAM
11	FW	Rafael Toribio	August 21, 1958	18	?	(Mexico) Cruz Azul
12	GK	José Gomez	January 14, 1955	21	?	(Mexico) Cruz Azul
13	DF	Antonio Hernández	April 1, 1955	21	?	(Mexico) UNAM
14	DF	Jorge López Malo	August 14, 1957	18	?	(Mexico) Cruz Azul
15	DF	Mario Carrillo	February 1, 1956	20	?	(Mexico) Cruz Azul
16	MF	Alfredo Navarrete	March 31, 1955	21	?	(Mexico) Puebla
17	MF	Guillermo Cosio	September 15, 1958	18	?	(Mexico) Zacatepec

Note: Mexican selections for the 1972 and 1976 Olympics consisted of entirely amateur players.

== North Korea ==
Head coach: Pak Doo-ik

No.	Pos.	Player	Date of birth	Age	Caps	Club	Tournament games	Tournament goals	Minutes played	Sub off	Sub on	Cards yellow/red
1	GK	Jin In-chol	February 2, 1948	28	?
2	DF	Kim Gwang-sok	May 20, 1950	26	?
3	DF	Kim Il-nam	July 1, 1954	22	?
4	DF	Kim Myong-song	June 10, 1948	28	?	(North Korea) April 25
5	DF	Kim Jong-min	April 19, 1947	29	?	(North Korea) April 25
6	MF	Kim Mu-gil	April 1, 1950	26	?
7	MF	Ma Jong-u	December 9, 1947	28	?
8	MF	Pak Jong-hun	March 10, 1948	28	?
9	FW	An Se-uk	October 29, 1946	?	?	(North Korea) April 25
10	FW	Hong Song-nam	February 12, 1947	29	?
11	MF	Cha Jong-sok	November 26, 1949	26	?
12	MF	Kim Sung-Gyu	March 12, 1949	27	?
13	FW	Yang Song-guk	August 18, 1944	?	?	(North Korea) April 25
14	DF	An Gil-wan	August 8, 1948	28	?
15	FW	Li Hi-yon	November 7, 1947	28	?
16	MF	Myong Dong-chan	January 8, 1948	28	?	(North Korea) April 25
17	GK	Park Kyong-won	August 19, 1946	30	?

== Poland ==
Head coach: Kazimierz Górski

No.	Pos.	Player	Date of birth	Age	Caps	Club	Tournament games	Tournament goals	Minutes played	Sub off	Sub on	Cards yellow/red
1	GK	Jan Tomaszewski	January 9, 1948	26	38	(Poland) ŁKS Łódź
2	DF	Antoni Szymanowski	January 13, 1951	25	51	(Poland) Wisła Kraków
3	DF	Jerzy Gorgoń	July 18, 1949	27	46	(Poland) Górnik Zabrze
4	DF	Wojciech Rudy	October 24, 1952	23	4	(Poland) Zagłębie Sosnowiec
5	DF	Władysław Żmuda	June 6, 1954	22	23	(Poland) Śląsk Wrocław
6	MF	Zygmunt Maszczyk	May 3, 1945	31	32	(Poland) Ruch Chorzów
7	FW	Grzegorz Lato	April 8, 1950	26	38	(Poland) Stal Mielec
8	MF	Henryk Kasperczak	July 10, 1946	30	37	(Poland) Stal Mielec
9	MF	Kazimierz Deyna	October 23, 1947	28	71	(Poland) KP Legia Warsaw
10	FW	Andrzej Szarmach	May 10, 1950	26	31	(Poland) Stal Mielec
11	FW	Kazimierz Kmiecik	September 19, 1951	24	21	(Poland) Wisła Kraków
12	GK	Piotr Mowlik	April 21, 1951	25	3	(Poland) KP Legia Warsaw
13	DF	Henryk Wawrowski	September 25, 1949	25	16	(Poland) Pogoń Szczecin
14	MF	Henryk Wieczorek	December 14, 1949	25	7	(Poland) Górnik Zabrze
15	MF	Lesław Ćmikiewicz	August 25, 1948	27	48	(Poland) KP Legia Warsaw
16	MF	Jan Benigier	February 18, 1950	26	3	(Poland) Ruch Chorzów
17	FW	Roman Ogaza	November 17, 1952	24	4	(Poland) GKS Tychy

== Soviet Union ==
Head coach: Valeriy Lobanovskyi

No.	Pos.	Player	Date of birth	Age	Caps	Club	Tournament games	Tournament goals	Minutes played	Sub off	Sub on	Cards yellow/red
1	GK	Vladimir Astapovskiy	July 16, 1946	30	?	(Soviet Union) CSKA Moscow	5	0	450	0	0
2	DF	Anatoliy Konkov	September 19, 1949	27	?	(Soviet Union) Dynamo Kyiv	2	0	112	1	0
3	DF	Viktor Matvienko	November 9, 1948	27	?	(Soviet Union) Dynamo Kyiv	5	0	450	0	0
4	DF	Mykhaylo Fomenko	September 19, 1948	27	?	(Soviet Union) Dynamo Kyiv	5	0	302	0	3
5	DF	Stefan Reshko	March 24, 1947	29	?	(Soviet Union) Dynamo Kyiv	4	0	360	0	0
6	DF	Volodymyr Troshkin	September 28, 1947	28	?	(Soviet Union) Dynamo Kyiv	5	0	445	0	0	2Y/1R
7	MF	David Kipiani	November 18, 1951	24	?	(Soviet Union) Dinamo Tbilisi	0	0	0	0	0
8	FW	Volodymyr Onyshchenko	October 28, 1949	25	?	(Soviet Union) Dynamo Kyiv	5	3	291	3	1
9	MF	Viktor Kolotov	July 3, 1949	27	?	(Soviet Union) Dynamo Kyiv	5	2	450	0	0
10	MF	Volodymyr Veremeyev	November 8, 1948	27	?	(Soviet Union) Dynamo Kyiv	4	1	248	1	1	2Y/1R
11	FW	Oleh Blokhin	November 5, 1952	23	?	(Soviet Union) Dynamo Kyiv	5	1	433	1	0
12	MF	Leonid Buryak	July 10, 1953	23	?	(Soviet Union) Dynamo Kyiv	5	0	425	1	0
13	DF	Vladimir Fyodorov	January 5, 1956	20	?	(Soviet Union) Pakhtakor Tashkent	4	0	151	0	3	1Y
14	MF	Aleksandr Minayev	August 11, 1954	21	?	(Soviet Union) Dynamo Moscow	5	1	450	0	0
15	DF	Viktor Zvyahintsev	October 22, 1950	25	?	(Soviet Union) Dynamo Kyiv	3	1	251	1	0	1Y
16	FW	Leonid Nazarenko	March 21, 1955	21	?	(Soviet Union) CSKA Moscow	2	1	112	1	1
17	GK	Aleksandr Prokhorov	July 18, 1946	30	?	(Soviet Union) Spartak Moscow	0	0	0	0	0

== Spain ==
Head coach: Ladislao Kubala

No.	Pos.	Player	Date of birth	Age	Caps	Club	Tournament games	Tournament goals	Minutes played	Sub off	Sub on	Cards yellow/red
1	GK	Luis Arconada	June 26, 1954	22	0	(Spain) Real Sociedad	2	0	180
2	DF	Isidoro San José	October 27, 1955	21	0	(Spain) Real Madrid	2	0	174	1
3	DF	Pedro Camus	July 13, 1955	21	1	(Spain) Racing Santander	2	0	110	1
4	DF	Francisco Sanjosé	November 12, 1952	24	0	(Spain) Sevilla	1	0	90
5	DF	Mariano Pulido	August 22, 1956	19	0	(Spain) Sevilla	1	0	90
6	MF	José Vicente Sánchez	October 8, 1956	19	0	(Spain) FC Barcelona	2	0	76		2
7	FW	Juanito	November 10, 1954	21	0	(Spain) Burgos	2	0	148	1		1 yellow
8	MF	Enrique Saura	August 2, 1954	21	0	(Spain) Valencia	2	0	180
9	FW	Santiago Idígoras	July 24, 1953	22	4	(Spain) Real Sociedad	2	1	180
10	MF	Alberto Vitoria	January 11, 1956	20	0	(Spain) Real Madrid	2	0	135	1
11	FW	Esteban Vigo	January 17, 1955	21	1	(Spain) Málaga	2	0	180			1 yellow
12	DF	Cundi	April 13, 1955	21	0	(Spain) Sporting de Gijón	1	0	90
13	GK	José Manzanedo	February 10, 1956	20	0	(Spain) Burgos	0	0	0
14	DF	Antonio Olmo	January 18, 1954	22	0	(Spain) FC Barcelona	2	0	180
15	MF	Francisco Javier Bermejo	March 9, 1956	20	0	(Spain) Atlético Madrid	1	0	90
16	FW	Miquel Mir	March 24, 1956	20	0	(Spain) FC Barcelona	1	0	45		1
17	FW	Juani	October 3, 1955	20	0	(Spain) Las Palmas	1	0	32		1
