= Football at the 1975 Mediterranean Games – Men's team squads =

Below are the squads for the Football at the 1975 Mediterranean Games, hosted in Algiers, Algeria, and took place between 24 August and 6 September 1975.

== Group A ==
=== Algeria B ===
Coach: Rachid Mekhloufi

No.	Pos.	Player	Date of birth (age)	Caps	Goals	Club
	GK	Mehdi Cerbah	3 April 1953 (aged 22)			(Algerian Football Federation) JS Kawkabi
	GK	Lyès Teldja	7 January 1954 (aged 21)			(Algerian Football Federation) NR Alger
	DF	Rabah Menguelti	28 November 1951 (aged 23)			(Algerian Football Federation) JS Kawkabi
	DF	Abdelmalek Ali Messaoud	17 January 1955 (aged 20)			(Algerian Football Federation) USM Alger
	DF	Zoubir Maâziz	4 October 1949 (aged 25)			(Algerian Football Federation) CR Belcourt
	DF	Djamel Keddou	30 January 1952 (aged 23)			(Algerian Football Federation) USM Alger
	DF	Hocine Boumaraf	3 June 1954 (aged 21)			(Algerian Football Federation) NR Alger
	DF	Abdelkader Chaouch	4 April 1954 (aged 21)			(Algerian Football Federation) SA Mohammadia
	MF	Mokhtar Kaoua	24 September 1953 (aged 21)			(Algerian Football Federation) NR Alger
	MF	Amar Meziane Cherif	1954 (aged 21)			(Algerian Football Federation) JS El Biar
	MF	Abdelkader Ighili	15 April 1953 (aged 22)			(Algerian Football Federation) WA Boufarik
	MF	Abdelaziz Safsafi	14 February 1954 (aged 21)			(Algerian Football Federation) NR Alger
	FW	Mohammed Habib Benkada	5 August 1950 (aged 25)			(Algerian Football Federation) HN Sig
	FW	Omar Betrouni	3 November 1949 (aged 25)			(Algerian Football Federation) MC Alger
	FW	Mohamed Griche	22 February 1952 (aged 23)			(Algerian Football Federation) ES Sétif
	FW	Hocine Rabet	6 March 1953 (aged 22)			(Algerian Football Federation) HAMRA Annaba
	FW	Aïssa Draoui	30 January 1950 (aged 25)			(Algerian Football Federation) MC Alger
	FW	Mourad Naïm	8 April 1953 (aged 22)			(Algerian Football Federation) NA Hussein Dey

=== Egypt ===
Coach: (East Germany) Burkhard Pape

No.	Pos.	Player	Date of birth (age)	Caps	Goals	Club
	GK	Ekramy El-Shahat	26 October 1955 (aged 19)			(Egyptian Football Association) Al-Ahly
	GK	Hassan Ali				(Egyptian Football Association) Tersana
	DF	Ahmed Abdel Baquy	1 February 1952 (aged 23)			(Egyptian Football Association) Al-Ahly
	DF	Moustafa Younis	25 December 1953 (aged 21)			(Egyptian Football Association) Al-Ahly
	DF	Fathi Mabrouk	5 July 1951 (aged 24)			(Egyptian Football Association) Al-Ahly
	DF	Hassan Hamdy	2 August 1949 (aged 26)			(Egyptian Football Association) Al-Ahly
	DF	Mohamed El Seyagui				(Egyptian Football Association) Ghazl El-Mahalla
	MF	Farouk Gaafar	29 October 1952 (aged 22)			(Egyptian Football Association) Zamalek
	MF	Shaker Abdel Fattah	4 March 1951 (aged 24)			(Egyptian Football Association) Tersana
	FW	Hassan Shehata	19 June 1947 (aged 28)			(Egyptian Football Association) Zamalek
	FW	Ossama Khalil	5 February 1954 (aged 21)			(Egyptian Football Association) Ismaily
	FW	Adel El-Bably	18 November 1950 (aged 24)			(Egyptian Football Association) Al-Ittihad Alexandria
	FW	Ali Khalil	1 January 1952 (aged 23)			(Egyptian Football Association) Zamalek
	FW	Mussad Nur	23 April 1951 (aged 24)			(Egyptian Football Association) Al-Masry

=== France B ===
Coach: Gabriel Robert

No.	Pos.	Player	Date of birth (age)	Caps	Goals	Club
	GK	Marc Duval	16 December 1951 (aged 23)			(French Football Federation) SC Toulon
	GK	Henri Orlandini	9 August 1955 (aged 20)			(French Football Federation) Nîmes Olympique
	DF	Jean-Claude Cloët	11 July 1951 (aged 24)			(French Football Federation) AS Nancy
	DF	Paul Marchioni	1 January 1955 (aged 20)			(French Football Federation) SC Bastia
	DF	Serge Perruchini	7 January 1955 (aged 20)			(French Football Federation) AS Monaco
	DF	Michel Pottier	12 January 1948 (aged 27)			(French Football Federation) AC Cambrai
	DF	Alexandre Stassievitch	20 September 1950 (aged 24)			(French Football Federation) RC Lens
	MF	Michel Cougé	11 June 1954 (aged 21)			(French Football Federation) Stade Rennais
	MF	Jean Fernandez	8 October 1954 (aged 20)			(French Football Federation) Olympique de Marseille
	MF	Omar Sahnoun	18 August 1955 (aged 20)			(French Football Federation) FC Nantes
	MF	Jean-Paul Pottier	10 July 1949 (aged 26)			(French Football Federation) SM Caen
	MF	Michel Raulin	25 February 1952 (aged 23)			(French Football Federation) CS Sedan
	FW	Bernard Castellani	8 February 1955 (aged 20)			(French Football Federation) OGC Nice
	FW	Yvon Delestre	24 November 1952 (aged 22)			(French Football Federation) Olympique lyonnais
	FW	Olivier Rouyer	1 December 1955 (aged 19)			(French Football Federation) AS Nancy
	FW	Christian Lauterbach	2 December 1951 (aged 23)			(French Football Federation) ÉDS Montluçon
	FW	Patrick Martet	29 April 1955 (aged 20)			(French Football Federation) AS Poissy
	FW	Dominique Rocheteau	14 January 1955 (aged 20)			(French Football Federation) AS Saint-Étienne

=== Greece Ol. ===
Coach:

No.	Pos.	Player	Date of birth (age)	Caps	Goals	Club
	DF	Koulis Apostolidis	3 March 1946 (aged 29)			(Hellenic Football Federation) PAOK
	MF	Giorgos Vlantis	30 January 1958 (aged 17)			(Hellenic Football Federation) AEK Athens
	MF	Nikolaos Liakos	19 February 1956 (aged 19)			(Hellenic Football Federation) PAS Giannina
	FW	Konstantinos Orfanos	22 August 1956 (aged 19)			(Hellenic Football Federation) PAOK FC
		Alexandros Fountoulakis				(Hellenic Football Federation) Vyzas

== Group B ==
=== Morocco ===
Coach: (Romania) Virgil Mărdărescu

No.	Pos.	Player	Date of birth (age)	Caps	Goals	Club
	GK	Mohammed Hazzaz	30 November 1945 (aged 29)			(Royal Moroccan Football Federation) MAS Fez
	DF	Chérif Fetoui	1 January 1945 (aged 30)			(Royal Moroccan Football Federation) MAS Fez
	DF	Mustapha Yaghcha	7 November 1952 (aged 22)			(Royal Moroccan Football Federation) Difaa El Jadida
	DF	Larbi Ahardane	6 June 1954 (aged 21)			(Royal Moroccan Football Federation) Wydad AC
	DF	Abdelmajid Lamriss	12 February 1959 (aged 16)			(Royal Moroccan Football Federation) Mouloudia de Marrakech
	MF	Abdelmajid Dolmy	19 April 1953 (aged 22)			(Royal Moroccan Football Federation) Raja Casablanca

=== Tunisia ===
Coach: Abdelmajid Chetali

No.	Pos.	Player	Date of birth (age)	Caps	Goals	Club
	GK	Sadok "Attouga" Sassi	15 November 1945 (aged 29)			(Tunisian Football Federation) Club Africain
	GK	Moncef Tabka				(Tunisian Football Federation) US Monastir
	GK	Anouar Cherif				(Tunisian Football Federation) ES Sahel
	DF	Ali Kaabi	15 November 1953 (aged 21)			(Tunisian Football Federation) COT Tunis
	DF	Ridha Ayech				(Tunisian Football Federation) ES Sahel
	DF	Ali Retima	31 January 1949 (aged 26)			(Tunisian Football Federation) Club Africain
	DF	Mohsen "Jendoubi" Labidi	15 January 1954 (aged 21)			(Tunisian Football Federation) Stade Tunisien
	DF	Amri Melki				(Tunisian Football Federation) ES Sahel
	MF	Khaled Gasmi	8 April 1953 (aged 22)			(Tunisian Football Federation) CA Bizertin
	MF	Tarak Dhiab	15 July 1954 (aged 21)			(Tunisian Football Federation) ES Tunis
	MF	Néjib Ghommidh	12 March 1953 (aged 22)			(Tunisian Football Federation) Club Africain
	MF	Hamadi Agrebi	20 March 1951 (aged 24)			(Tunisian Football Federation) CS Sfaxien
	MF	Moncef Khouini	4 November 1951 (aged 23)			(Tunisian Football Federation) Club Africain
	FW	Néjib Liman	12 June 1953 (aged 22)			(Tunisian Football Federation) Stade Tunisien
	FW	Mohieddine Habita	28 September 1953 (aged 21)			(Tunisian Football Federation) COT Tunis
	FW	Nacer Kerrit				(Tunisian Football Federation) Stade Tunisien
	FW	Témime Lahzami	1 January 1949 (aged 26)			(Tunisian Football Federation) ES Tunis
	FW	Abderraouf Ben Aziza	23 September 1953 (aged 21)			(Tunisian Football Federation) ES Sahel
	FW	Hamed Kammoun	27 August 1955 (aged 19)			(Tunisian Football Federation) ES Sahel

=== Turkey B ===
Coach:

No.	Pos.	Player	Date of birth (age)	Caps	Goals	Club
	GK	Bahattin Demircan	10 April 1956 (aged 19)			(Turkish Football Federation) İzmirspor
		Erhan Arslan	13 November 1956 (aged 18)			(Turkish Football Federation) Tekirdağspor
		Şevket Kesler	31 October 1956 (aged 18)			(Turkish Football Federation) Adanaspor
		Öner Kılıç	15 May 1954 (aged 21)			(Turkish Football Federation) MKE Kırıkkalespor
		Cemal Karagöz				(Turkish Football Federation) Gaziantepspor
		Nurettin Güneş	15 August 1955 (aged 20)			(Turkish Football Federation) Şekerspor
		Samet Aybaba	3 February 1955 (aged 20)			(Turkish Football Federation) İskenderunspor
		Orhan Ozan	5 January 1956 (aged 19)			(Turkish Football Federation) Antalyaspor
		İsmet Saral				(Turkish Football Federation) Boluspor
		Kemal Kılıç	25 April 1956 (aged 19)			(Turkish Football Federation) Zonguldakspor
		Ercan Albay	4 December 1954 (aged 20)			(Turkish Football Federation) MKE Kırıkkalespor
		Ümit Altınmakas				(Turkish Football Federation) Bursaspor
		Necmettin Dağdeviren	28 December 1954 (aged 20)			(Turkish Football Federation) Şekerspor
		Ali Çoban	1 October 1955 (aged 19)			(Turkish Football Federation) Zonguldakspor
		Cüneyt Müdüroğlu				(Turkish Football Federation) Manisaspor
		Hamit Ayden	25 January 1956 (aged 19)			(Turkish Football Federation) Elazığspor
