= Football at the 1974 Central American and Caribbean Games =

1974 Central American and Caribbean Games
Tournament details
- Host country: Dominican Republic
- Dates: 28 February-12 March
- Teams: 6 (from 1 confederation)
- Venue: 1 (in 1 host city)

Final positions
- Champions: Cuba (3rd title)
- Runners-up: Trinidad and Tobago
- Third place: Bermuda
- Fourth place: Mexico

Tournament statistics
- Matches played: 24
- Goals scored: 63 (2.63 per match)
- Top scorer(s): (Bermuda) Ralph Bean (9 goals)

Football was contested for men only at the 1974 Central American and Caribbean Games in Santo Domingo, Dominican Republic. All matches took place at the newly constructed Félix Sánchez Olympic Stadium.

The gold medal was won by Cuba for the second time, who defeated Trinidad and Tobago in the final on penalties after a 1-1 draw.

Event	Gold	Silver	Bronze
Men's football	Cuba (CUB)	Trinidad and Tobago (TRI)	Bermuda (BER)

== Qualifying tournament ==
The 1973 Central American Games was the first of its kind and all games took place in Guatemala between 24 November and 2 December 1973, for U-21 teams. The tournament was won by Panama's U-21 side, with the second-placed team being Nicaragua, hence assuring qualification for the 1974 Central American and Caribbean Games.

== Participants ==
- Bahamas
- Barbados
- Bermuda
- Cuba
- Dominican Republic (Hosts)
- Mexico
- Nicaragua
- Panama
- Puerto Rico
- Trinidad and Tobago

== First stage ==
=== Group A ===
A 2 point system used.

Pos	Team	Pld	W	D	L	GF	GA	GD	Pts	Qualification or relegation
1	Cuba	4	4	0	0	16	0	+16	8	Final stage
2	Trinidad and Tobago	3	2	0	1	7	1	+6	4	Final stage
3	Barbados	3	2	0	1	3	2	+1	4	Eliminated
4	Nicaragua	4	1	0	3	2	10	−8	2	Eliminated
5	Puerto Rico	4	0	0	4	1	16	−15	0	Eliminated

Does not include the annulled result between Trinidad and Tobago and Barbados, but Trinidad and Tobago still qualified on goal difference.

28 February 1974

Nicaragua	2–1	Puerto Rico
Cuadra 4'; Granja 50'	Report	Luis Vega 47'

Félix Sánchez Olympic Stadium, Santo Domingo
28 February 1974

Cuba	2–0	Barbados
Lara 47'; Elejalde 52'	Report

San Cristóbal stadium, San Cristóbal
2 March 1974

Barbados	2–0	Puerto Rico
Clarke 30'; Prescott 69'	Report

Félix Sánchez Olympic Stadium, Santo Domingo
2 March 1974

Trinidad and Tobago	3–0	Nicaragua
Llewelyn 44', 66'; Roberts 55'	Report

Félix Sánchez Olympic Stadium, Santo Domingo
4 March 1974

Cuba	8–0	Puerto Rico
Piedra 5', 48', 63'; Roldán 18', 29', 69'; Fariñas 56', 81'	Report

Félix Sánchez Olympic Stadium, Santo Domingo
4 March 1974

Trinidad and Tobago	1–0 Annulled	Barbados
Llewelyn 5'	Report

Félix Sánchez Olympic Stadium, Santo Domingo
6 March 1974

Barbados	1–0	Nicaragua
Goddard 25'	Report

San Cristóbal stadium, San Cristóbal
6 March 1974

Cuba	1–0	Trinidad and Tobago
Fariñas 33'	Report

Félix Sánchez Olympic Stadium, Santo Domingo
8 March 1974

Cuba	5–0	Nicaragua
Pereira 5'; Hernández 20'; Piedra 40', 43', 70'	Report

Félix Sánchez Olympic Stadium, Santo Domingo
8 March 1974

Trinidad and Tobago	4–0	Puerto Rico
Llewelyn 18', 40', 69'; Murren 56'	Report

Félix Sánchez Olympic Stadium, Santo Domingo

=== Group 2 ===
A 2 point system used.

Pos	Team	Pld	W	D	L	GF	GA	GD	Pts	Qualification or relegation
1	Mexico	4	3	1	0	6	1	+5	7	Final stage
2	Bermuda	4	3	1	0	8	3	+5	7	Final stage
3	Panama	4	1	0	3	3	4	−1	2	Eliminated
4	Dominican Republic	4	1	0	3	5	7	−2	2	Eliminated
5	Bahamas	4	1	0	3	1	8	−7	2	Eliminated

Mexico won the group by lot.

28 February 1974

Dominican Republic	2–3	Bermuda
D. García 38'; Díaz 69'	Report	Bean 2', 89'; Trott 55'

Félix Sánchez Olympic Stadium, Santo Domingo
28 February 1974

Mexico	Postponed by storm	Panama
	Report

Félix Sánchez Olympic Stadium, Santo Domingo
2 March 1974

Bermuda	1–0	Panama
Bean 61'	Report

Félix Sánchez Olympic Stadium, Santo Domingo
2 March 1974

Dominican Republic	2–0	Bahamas
Ramírez 70'; Díaz 80'	Report

San Cristóbal stadium, San Cristóbal
3 March 1974

Mexico	1–0	Panama
Viveros 55' (pen.)	Report

Félix Sánchez Olympic Stadium, Santo Domingo
4 March 1974

Bahamas	1–0	Panama
Reynoso 70'	Report

Félix Sánchez Olympic Stadium, Santo Domingo
4 March 1974

Mexico	1–1	Bermuda
Viveros 75'	Report	Bean 42'

San Cristóbal stadium, San Cristóbal
6 March 1974

Dominican Republic	1–3	Panama
Ramírez 46'	Report	Escobar 45', 50'; Torres 85' (pen.)

Félix Sánchez Olympic Stadium, Santo Domingo
6 March 1974

Mexico	3–0	Bahamas
Rangel 10'; Padilla 25'; Báez 56'	Report

Félix Sánchez Olympic Stadium, Santo Domingo
8 March 1974

Bermuda	3–0	Bahamas
Bean 17', 65', 88'	Report

San Cristóbal stadium, San Cristóbal
8 March 1974

Dominican Republic	0–1	Mexico
	Report	Caballero 86'

Félix Sánchez Olympic Stadium, Santo Domingo

== Final stage ==
Semi-finals
10 March
Cuba	2
Bermuda	0
10 March
Trinidad and Tobago	2
Mexico	1

Final
12 March
Cuba (pen)	1 (3)
Trinidad and Tobago	1 (0)
Third place
12 March
Mexico	0
Bermuda	3

=== Semi-finals ===
10 March 1974

Cuba	2-0	Bermuda
Pérez 6'; Piedra 28'	Report

Félix Sánchez Olympic Stadium, Santo Domingo
10 March 1974

Trinidad and Tobago	2–1	Mexico
Haynes 76'; Harris 85'	Report	Caballero 87'

Félix Sánchez Olympic Stadium, Santo Domingo

=== Third-place match ===
12 March 1974

Mexico	0–3	Bermuda
	Report	Dill 11'; Bean 85', 88'

Félix Sánchez Olympic Stadium, Santo Domingo

=== Final ===
12 March 1974

Cuba	1–1 (a.e.t.)	Trinidad and Tobago
Delgado 100'	Report	Mitchell 107'
Penalties
Penalty scored	3–0	Penalty missed

Félix Sánchez Olympic Stadium, Santo Domingo

1974 Central American and Caribbean Games

Cuba
3rd title

== Statistics ==
=== Goalscorers ===
There were 63 goals scored in 24 matches, for an average of 2.62 goals per match.

9 goals

- (Bermuda) Ralph Bean

7 goals

- (Cuba) Francisco Piedra

6 goals

- (Trinidad and Tobago) Noel Llewelyn

3 goals

- (Cuba) Francisco Fariñas
- (Cuba) Andrés Roldán

2 goals

- (Dominican Republic) Francisco Ramírez
- (Dominican Republic) Ramón Díaz
- (Mexico) Bardomiano Viveros
- (Mexico) José Luis Caballero
- (Panama) Simeón Escobar

1 goal

- (The Bahamas) Luis Reynoso
- (Barbados) George Prescott
- (Barbados) Victor Clarke
- (Barbados) Victor Goddard
- (Bermuda) Anthony Dill
- (Bermuda) Winston Trott
- (Cuba) Dagoberto Lara
- (Cuba) José Luis Elejalde
- (Cuba) Luis Hernández
- (Cuba) Orestes Pérez
- (Cuba) Regino Delgado
- (Cuba) Roberto Pereira
- (Dominican Republic) Dámaso García
- (Mexico) Víctor Rangel
- (Mexico) Oscar Padilla
- (Mexico) Daniel Báez
- (Nicaragua) Manuel Cuadra
- (Nicaragua) Víctor Manuel Granja
- (Puerto Rico) Luis Vega
- (Panama) Rafael Torres
- (Trinidad and Tobago) Godfrey Harris
- (Trinidad and Tobago) Peter Mitchell
- (Trinidad and Tobago) Raymond Roberts
- (Trinidad and Tobago) Selwyn Murren
- (Trinidad and Tobago) Ulric Haynes
