= Luiz Alberto Pirola =

Brazilian footballer (born 1954)

Personal information
- Full name: Luiz Alberto da Costa Pirola
- Date of birth: 8 July 1954 (age 72)
- Place of birth: Araraquara, Brazil
- Position: Forward

Youth career
- Ferroviária

Senior career*
Years	Team	Apps	(Gls)
1970–1972	Ferroviária		
1972	Guarani		
1973–1977	Fluminense	42	(11)
1975	→ Desportiva-ES (loan)		
1977–1989	Comercial-SP	450+	
1978	→ Vila Nova (loan)		

International career
1975	Brazil Olympic	3	(4)
Medal record
Men's Football
Representing Brazil
Pan American Games
Winner	1975 Mexico City
- * Club domestic league appearances and goals as of 24 November 2023

Luiz Alberto Pirola (born 8 July 1954) is a Brazilian former professional footballer who played as a forward.

== Career ==
Luiz Alberto started his career at Ferroviária, and after standing out in São Paulo state football, went to Fluminense FC, where he won the Campeonato Carioca titles in 1975 and 1976. He became the player who made the most appearances for Comercial de Ribeirão Preto, where played from 1977 to 1989.

== International career ==
Luiz Alberto was part of the Olympic team of Brazil in 1975, being gold medal of the 1975 Pan American Games (alongside Mexico). During the Pan American Games dispute, on 17 October, Luiz Alberto scored 4 goals in the historic 14–0 win against Nicaragua.

== Personal life ==
After retiring from football, Luiz Alberto became a police investigator in the city of Araraquara.

== Honours ==
Brazil Olympic

- Pan American Games: (gold) 1975

Fluminense

- Campeonato Carioca: 1975, 1976
