= 1978–79 Mexican Primera División season =

37th professional season of the top-flight football league in Mexico

Primera División de México
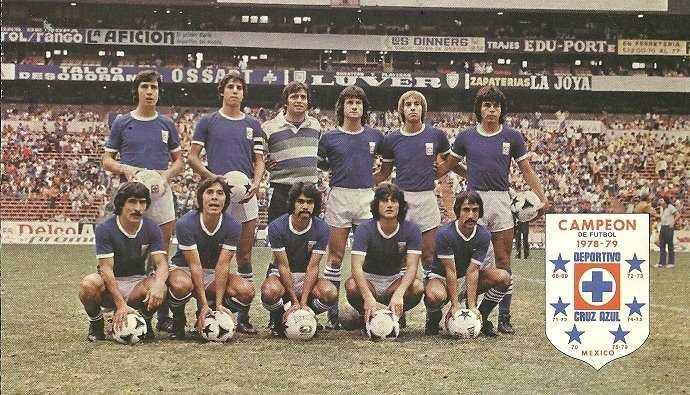
- The Cruz Azul winning squad of the season
- Season: 1978–79
- Champions: Cruz Azul (6th title)
- Relegated: Veracruz
- Champions' Cup: Cruz Azul; UNAM
- Matches: 406
- Goals: 1,148 (2.83 per match)

Statistics of the Primera División de México for the 1978–79 season.

== Overview ==
Zacatepec was promoted to Primera División.

This season was contested by 20 teams, and Cruz Azul won the championship.

Veracruz was relegated to Segunda División.

=== Teams ===
Location of the 1978-79 Primera División teams

Team	City	Stadium
América	Mexico City	Azteca
Atlante	Mexico City	Azteca
Atlético Español	Mexico City	Azteca
Atlético Potosino	San Luis Potosí, S.L.P.	Plan de San Luis
Cruz Azul	Mexico City	Azteca
Guadalajara	Guadalajara, Jalisco	Jalisco
Jalisco	Guadalajara, Jalisco	Jalisco
León	León, Guanajuato	León
Monterrey	Monterrey, Nuevo León	Universitario
Neza	Nezahualcóyotl, State of Mexico	Municipal de Texcoco
Puebla	Puebla, Puebla	Cuauhtémoc
Tampico	Tampico, Tamaulipas	Tamaulipas
Tecos	Zapopan, Jalisco	Tres de Marzo
Toluca	Toluca, State of Mexico	Toluca 70
Unión de Curtidores	León, Guanajuato	La Martinica
UANL	Monterrey, Nuevo León	Universitario
UdeG	Guadalajara, Jalisco	Jalisco
UNAM	Mexico City	Olímpico Universitario
Veracruz	Veracruz, Veracruz	Veracruzano
Zacatepec	Zacatepec, Morelos	Agustín Coruco Díaz

== Group stage ==
=== Group 1 ===
Pos	Team	Pld	W	D	L	GF	GA	GD	Pts	Qualification or relegation
1	Monterrey	38	14	12	12	52	43	+9	40	Playoffs
2	América	38	14	9	15	58	49	+9	37	Playoffs
3	Guadalajara	38	11	13	14	43	56	−13	35	
4	Atlante	38	9	13	16	51	56	−5	31	
5	Veracruz	38	7	9	22	35	83	−48	23	Relegated

=== Group 2 ===
Pos	Team	Pld	W	D	L	GF	GA	GD	Pts	Qualification
1	UNAM	38	17	11	10	77	57	+20	45	Playoffs
2	Atlético Potosino	38	19	7	12	58	55	+3	45	Playoffs
3	Tampico	38	11	13	14	59	65	−6	35	
4	León	38	13	7	18	50	67	−17	33	
5	Jalisco	38	8	12	18	49	67	−18	28	

=== Group 3 ===
Pos	Team	Pld	W	D	L	GF	GA	GD	Pts	Qualification
1	Cruz Azul	38	19	13	6	70	32	+38	51	Playoffs
2	Toluca	38	19	7	12	59	43	+16	45	Playoffs
3	Puebla	38	14	14	10	53	49	+4	42	
4	UDG	38	15	7	16	60	57	+3	37	
5	Unión de Curtidores	38	12	11	15	54	57	−3	35	

=== Group 4 ===
Pos	Team	Pld	W	D	L	GF	GA	GD	Pts	Qualification
1	UANL	38	17	14	7	58	46	+12	48	Playoffs
2	Zacatepec	38	15	13	10	55	45	+10	43	Playoffs
3	Tecos	38	13	15	10	56	44	+12	41	
4	Atlético Español	38	13	10	15	54	62	−8	36	
5	Deportivo Neza	38	10	10	18	35	53	−18	30	

== Results ==
Home \ Away	AME	ATN	ATE	APO	CRA	GDL	JAL	LEO	MTY	NEZ	PUE	TAM	TOL	UDC	TEC	UNL	UDG	UNM	VER	ZAC
América		3–1	3–3	1–1	3–3	0–0	1–0	3–1	4–0	6–1	0–0	2–1	1–0	1–2	2–0	0–1	3–2	0–3	4–2	3–0
Atlante	2–1		2–2	4–1	0–4	2–0	4–1	1–2	0–0	1–1	1–1	2–1	1–2	0–0	2–0	0–1	1–2	1–2	2–1	0–1
Atlético Español	1–0	3–2		1–1	1–1	0–1	1–1	0–3	1–2	4–1	1–0	1–1	5–4	2–1	0–3	3–3	1–2	2–1	4–2	0–1
Atlético Potosino	0–2	1–0	0–3		3–2	4–0	0–0	1–0	2–1	3–1	2–0	2–0	1–1	1–0	1–0	2–2	1–0	1–4	4–1	2–1
Cruz Azul	3–1	0–0	3–0	4–0		4–1	3–1	2–2	1–1	1–0	3–0	2–1	3–1	1–1	3–2	3–0	0–0	4–1	5–0	3–1
Guadalajara	0–0	3–3	1–1	1–3	0–0		1–1	2–0	2–1	2–1	3–1	2–2	2–0	1–1	1–0	2–0	2–2	1–0	1–0	1–1
Jalisco	0–3	2–2	1–2	6–4	2–1	3–1		1–2	1–2	0–0	0–1	2–2	2–0	2–2	1–0	0–1	2–1	3–2	0–1	1–1
León	0–2	0–2	1–3	0–1	2–3	2–1	0–3		0–0	2–1	2–1	4–4	3–2	2–0	2–3	1–0	1–1	1–1	4–0	1–2
Monterrey	1–1	3–1	1–0	1–0	1–1	3–1	1–0	0–1		1–0	1–0	4–1	1–1	1–2	4–0	0–0	4–1	2–2	5–0	0–2
Deportivo Neza	1–0	2–1	2–1	2–0	1–0	2–3	1–1	0–1	2–1		0–0	1–1	1–3	1–1	0–0	2–1	2–1	1–2	2–1	2–2
Puebla	2–1	2–1	3–0	4–1	0–0	1–1	3–1	3–2	3–1	1–0		1–3	3–3	1–1	2–0	0–2	3–2	1–1	5–1	1–1
Tampico	3–2	3–2	1–1	2–0	0–4	1–0	3–3	7–1	2–2	0–1	0–0		0–0	0–2	0–1	3–1	2–1	3–0	0–0	2–3
Toluca	2–1	2–3	4–0	0–0	3–1	2–0	2–2	2–0	1–0	3–1	3–0	2–1		1–0	3–2	2–2	0–0	4–0	4–0	1–0
Unión de Curtidores	1–1	2–2	1–0	2–3	2–0	1–0	3–2	1–1	0–0	1–0	2–2	1–2	1–2		1–0	2–2	3–0	2–1	2–1	3–0
Tecos	3–1	1–0	0–1	0–1	1–0	1–1	4–0	6–1	1–1	1–1	1–1	1–1	1–2	3–1		0–0	2–1	4–3	3–0	1–1
UANL	3–2	0–0	2–1	3–5	0–0	1–0	2–2	2–1	1–1	1–0	1–1	3–1	1–1	2–1	4–1		2–1	2–1	5–0	0–0
UDG	2–1	2–1	1–0	2–1	1–1	2–2	3–0	0–1	3–0	2–0	1–1	3–4	2–1	4–1	0–3	1–2		1–2	5–2	2–1
UNAM	2–0	1–1	4–1	1–3	1–1	4–2	3–1	3–1	2–0	2–0	3–1	8–1	1–1	2–1	1–1	4–2	4–2		1–1	1–1
Veracruz	2–2	1–1	1–3	2–1	0–1	2–0	3–1	1–1	1–4	1–0	0–2	1–1	2–0	1–1	1–1	0–3	0–2	1–1		1–0
Zacatepec	3–0	2–2	1–1	1–1	1–2	4–1	1–0	2–1	2–1	1–1	0–1	3–0	1–1	4–1	3–1	0–2	3–1	2–2	2–1	

Legend: Blue = home team win; Yellow = draw; Red = away team win.

== Group stage playoff ==
=== Semifinal ===
==== Group A ====
Pos	Team	Pld	W	D	L	GF	GA	GD	Pts	Qualification
1	Cruz Azul	6	4	1	1	8	5	+3	9	Finals
2	Toluca	6	3	0	3	9	5	+4	6	
3	América	6	3	0	3	7	6	+1	6	
4	Atlético Potosino	6	1	1	4	5	13	−8	3	

Group A Results

Round 1
América 1 - 0 Cruz Azul
Atlético Potosino 0 - 2 Toluca

Round 2
Cruz Azul 2 - 1 Atlético Potosino
Toluca 1 - 0 América

Round 3
Atlético Potosino 1 - 2 América
Toluca 0 - 1 Cruz Azul

Round 4
Cruz Azul 2 - 1 América
Toluca 5 - 0 Atlético Potosino

Round 5
Atlético Potosino 2 - 2 Cruz Azul
América 3 - 1 Toluca

Round 6
América 0 - 1 Atlético Potosino
Cruz Azul 1 - 0 Toluca

==== Group B ====
Pos	Team	Pld	W	D	L	GF	GA	GD	Pts	Qualification
1	UNAM	6	3	2	1	9	6	+3	8	Finals
2	UANL	6	3	2	1	8	7	+1	8	
3	Monterrey	6	1	4	1	8	8	0	6	
4	Zacatepec	6	0	2	4	6	10	−4	2	

Group B Results

Group 2

Round 1
U.N.A.M. 1 - 0 Zacatepec
Monterrey 0 - 1 U.A.N.L.

Round 2
U.N.A.M. 2 - 2 Monterrey
U.A.N.L. 2 - 1 Zacatepec

Round 3
Monterrey 2 - 1 Zacatepec
U.N.A.M. 3 - 0 U.A.N.L.

Round 4
Zacatepec 1 - 2 U.N.A.M.
U.A.N.L. 1 - 1 Monterrey

Round 5
Monterrey 1 - 1 U.N.A.M.
Zacatepec 1 - 1 U.A.N.L.

Round 6
U.A.N.L. 2 - 0 U.N.A.M.
Zacatepec 2 - 2 Monterrey

== Final ==
June 28, 1979

UNAM	0-0	Cruz Azul
	Report

Estadio Olimpico Universitario, Mexico City

Pumas UNAM	Cruz Azul

GK	20	(Mexico) Olaf Heredia
DF	5	(Mexico) Jesús Iturralde
DF	21	(Mexico) Gustavo Vargas López
DF	24	(Argentina) Jorge Paolino
DF	4	(Mexico) Arturo Vázquez
MF	18	(Mexico) Jesús Ramírez
MF	6	(Mexico) Pareja López
MF	8	(Mexico) Enrique López Zarza
FW	10	(Brazil) Ricardo Ferretti	(substituted off) 88'
FW	9	(Brazil) Cabinho
LM	11	(Mexico) Hugo Sánchez (c)
Substitutes:
DF	3	(Mexico) Ernesto Cervantes	(substituted on) 88'
Manager:
(Socialist Federal Republic of Yugoslavia) Bora Milutinović

GK	1	(Argentina) Miguel Marín
DF	2	(Mexico) Ignacio Flores
DF	13	(Mexico) Sergio Rubio
DF	5	(Argentina) Miguel Ángel Cornero
DF	15	(Mexico) Jorge López Malo
MF	6	(Mexico) Guillermo Mendizábal (c)
MF	7	(Paraguay) Carlos Jara Saguier
MF	8	(Mexico) Gerardo Lugo
FW	9	(Mexico) Rodolfo Montoya	(substituted off) 81'
FW	10	(Mexico) Horacio López Salgado
FW	11	(Argentina) José Luis Ceballos
Substitutes:
DF	14	(Mexico) Rafael Toribio	(substituted on) 81'
Manager:
(Mexico) Nacho Trelles

June 30, 1979

Cruz Azul	2-0	UNAM
Jara Saguier 69'; López Salgado 88'	Report

Estadio Azteca, Mexico City

Cruz Azul	Pumas UNAM

GK	1	(Argentina) Miguel Marín
DF	2	(Mexico) Ignacio Flores
DF	13	(Mexico) Sergio Rubio
DF	5	(Argentina) Miguel Ángel Cornero
DF	15	(Mexico) Jorge López Malo
MF	6	(Mexico) Guillermo Mendizábal (c)
MF	7	(Paraguay) Carlos Jara Saguier
MF	8	(Mexico) Gerardo Lugo
FW	9	(Mexico) Rodolfo Montoya	(substituted off) 74'
FW	10	(Mexico) Horacio López Salgado
FW	11	(Argentina) José Luis Ceballos	(substituted off) 83'
Substitutes:
FW	14	(Mexico) Rafael Toribio	(substituted on) 74'
FW	17	(Mexico) Adrián Camacho	(substituted on) 83'
Manager:
(Mexico) Nacho Trelles

GK	20	(Mexico) Olaf Heredia
DF	5	(Mexico) Jesús Iturralde
DF	21	(Mexico) Gustavo Vargas López	(substituted off) 70'
DF	24	(Argentina) Jorge Paolino
DF	4	(Mexico) Arturo Vázquez
MF	6	(Mexico) Pareja López
MF	18	(Mexico) Jesús Ramírez
MF	8	(Mexico) Enrique López Zarza
FW	7	(Peru) Juan José Muñante	(substituted off) 81'
FW	9	(Mexico) Cabinho
FW	11	(Mexico) Hugo Sánchez (c)
Substitutes:
DF	3	(Mexico) Ernesto Cervantes	(substituted on) 70'
MF	10	(Brazil) Ricardo Ferretti	(substituted on) 81'
Manager:
(Mexico) Nacho Trelles

Cruz Azul won 2-0 on aggregate.

1978–79 winners

6th title

== Top scorers ==
Player	Nationality	Goals	Club
Cabinho	Brazil	26	Pumas UNAM
Hugo Sánchez	Mexico	26	Pumas UNAM
Osvaldo Castro	Chile	24	Jalisco
Juan Manuel Azuara	Mexico	24	Tigres UANL
Carlos Eloir Perucci	Brazil	21	Atlético Español
Silvio Fogel	Argentina	21	Puebla
Rodolfo Montoya	Mexico	20	Cruz Azul
Ricardo Brandon	Uruguay	18	Toluca
Nílson Dias	Brazil	17	Leones Negros UdeG
Horacio López Salgado	Mexico	16	Cruz Azul
Miguel Ángel Gamboa	Chile	16	América
