= Carlinhos (footballer, born 1956) =

Brazilian footballer

Personal information
- Full name: Carlos Eduardo Duarte Ribeiro
- Date of birth: 21 April 1956 (age 70)
- Place of birth: São Gonçalo, Brazil
- Position: Left back

Youth career
- 1973–1975: Fluminense

Senior career*
Years	Team	Apps	(Gls)
1975–1979	Fluminense	128	(2)
1980–1983	Náutico		
1984–1985	Rio Negro-AM		
1986–1987	Vitória de Guimarães		

International career
1975	Brazil Olympic	4	(0)
Medal record
Men's Football
Representing Brazil
Pan American Games
Winner	1975 Mexico City
- * Club domestic league appearances and goals as of 24 November 2023

Carlos Eduardo Ribeiro (born 21 April 1956), better known as Carlinhos, is a Brazilian former professional footballer who played as a left back.

== Career ==
Carlinhos spent most of his career at Fluminense FC, the club that developed him, winning the Rio championship in 1975 and 1976. He also played for Náutico, Rio Negro and Vitória S.C.

== International career ==
Carlinhos was part of the Olympic team of Brazil in 1975, being gold medal of the 1975 Pan American Games (alongside Mexico).

== Honours ==
Brazil Olympic

- Pan American Games: (gold) 1975

Fluminense

- Campeonato Carioca: 1975, 1976
