= Wanchope =

Wanchope is a surname. Notable people with the surname include:

- The Wanchope family, a prominent family in Costa Rican football:
  - Vicente Wanchope (born 1946), Costa Rican footballer, or his sons:
    - Javier Wanchope (born 1968), Costa Rican footballer
    - Carlos Wanchope (born 1971), Costa Rican international footballer
    - Paulo Wanchope (born 1976), Costa Rican footballer
  - Carlos Watson (born 1951), Costa Rican footballer and brother of Vicente Wanchope
- Ramón Ábila (born 1989), Argentine footballer nicknamed "Wanchope"
