= Francisco Piedra =

Cuban footballer (born 1949)

Personal information
- Full name: Francisco Javier Piedra Menéndez
- Date of birth: 3 December 1950 (age 75)
- Place of birth: Zulueta, Villa Clara, Cuba
- Position: Forward

Senior career*
Years	Team	Apps	(Gls)
1967–1977	Azucareros		

International career
1967–1977	Cuba		(18)
Medal record
Men's football
Representing Cuba
Central American and Caribbean Games
Gold medal – first place	Panama 1970	Team
Gold medal – first place	Santo Domingo 1974	Team
Pan American Games
Bronze medal – third place	Cali 1971	Team
- * Club domestic league appearances and goals

Francisco Javier Piedra Menéndez (born 3 December 1950) is a Cuban retired footballer. Nicknamed "Chino", he played for Azucareros as a forward throughout the 1970s. He also represented his native country of Cuba throughout the decade, participating in many tournaments.

== Club career ==
Beginning his career at the age of 10, he played youth football until receiving his first professional contract with Azucareros in 1967 where he remained for the rest of his career.

== International career ==
Piedra was first called up for the 1970 Central American and Caribbean Games where Cuba would receive their first title after nearly 30 years. He also made appearances in the 1974 Central American and Caribbean Games, the 1971 Pan American Games where Cuba won bronze, the 1971 CONCACAF Championship and the 1975 Pan American Games with his international career concluding with the 1977 CONCACAF Championship qualification after narrowly failing to qualify against Haiti.

Throughout his career, he scored 18 goals for the Diablos Rojos, tying with Cuban defender Yénier Márquez as being the eighth top-scorer of all time for the club.

== Personal life ==
Born into a family of athletes, Francisco is the older brother of fellow footballer Pedro Piedra.

Alongside Alexander Driggs and Pedro Pablo Báez Chala, he was also invited to the XIII Congress of the Football Association of Cuba.
