= Sergio Padrón =

Cuban footballer and manager (1933–2023)

Personal information
- Full name: Sergio José Padrón Moreno
- Date of birth: 5 December 1933
- Place of birth: Havana, Cuba
- Date of death: 1 April 2023 (aged 89)
- Place of death: Havana, Cuba
- Position: Midfielder

Youth career
- –1949: Deportivo España
- 1950: Juventud Asturiana

Senior career*
Years	Team	Apps	(Gls)
1951–1960	Deportivo San Francisco		
1961–1964	Industriales		
1965–1966	La Habana		
- Agricultores

International career
1955–1965	Cuba	9+	(0+)

Managerial career
- 1967–1971: Cuba (assistant)
- 1970: Cuba
- 1971–1977: Cuba
- 1980–1981: Cuba (assistant)
- * Club domestic league appearances and goals

Sergio José Padrón Moreno (5 December 1933 – 12 April 2023) was a Cuban footballer and manager who played as a midfielder

== Early life and playing career ==
Padrón started playing football in the Plaza de la Revolución area of Havana, starting his career as a striker, before being played as a defender, and finally as a midfielder. He started his career in the youth teams of Deportivo España and Juventud Asturiana, before making his senior debut for Deportivo San Francisco. He later played for Industriales, FC La Habana, and Agricultores.

With the Cuba national team, he participated at the 1955, 1957, and 1961 CCCF Championships. Additionally, he made four appearances in 1966 FIFA World Cup qualification.

== Managerial career ==
In 1967, Padrón became the assistant manager of the Cuban national team. In 1970, he coached the Cuban national team during a tour of North Vietnam, before continuing to work as an assistant under Kim Yong-ha, including during a six-month training camp in North Korea.

In 1974, he helped Cuba win a gold medal at the 1974 Central American and Caribbean Games, before later coaching them at the 1975 Pan American Games, the 1976 CONCACAF Pre-Olympic Tournament and 1976 Summer Olympics, and 1977 CONCACAF Championship qualification. He later worked as an assistant manager to Tibor Ivanicz between 1980 and 1981.

== Post-managerial career ==
In 1981, he began working for the Football Association of Cuba as a methodologist.

== Death ==
Padrón died in Havana on 12 April 2023, at the age of 89.
