= Gabriel Marques =

Gabriel Marques or Marquez may refer to:

- Gabriel García Márquez (1927–2014), Colombian writer and journalist
- Gabriel Márquez (footballer) (born 1956), Mexican footballer
- Gabriel Marques (attorney) (born 1983), American attorney
- Gabriel Marques (footballer) (born 1988), Brazilian footballer
