= Gerardo Lugo =

Gerardo Lugo may refer to:

- Gerardo Lugo (footballer, born 1955), Mexican football midfielder
- Gerardo Lugo (footballer, born 1984), Mexican football winger, and son of footballer born 1955
