= Arzate =

Arzate is a surname. Notable people with the surname include:

- Memo Arzate (born 1981), American soccer player
- Rafael Toribio Arzate (born 1958), Mexican footballer
