= Orestes Pérez =

Cuban footballer (born 1947)

Personal information
- Full name: Orestes Pérez Naranjo
- Date of birth: 7 July 1947 (age 79)
- Place of birth: Florida, Camagüey, Cuba
- Position: Midfielder

Senior career*
Years	Team	Apps	(Gls)
1965–1975	Granjeros		

International career
1970–1975	Cuba		
Medal record
Men's football
Representing Cuba
Central American and Caribbean Games
Gold medal – first place	Panama 1970	Team
Gold medal – first place	Santo Domingo 1974	Team
Pan American Games
Bronze medal – third place	Cali 1971	Team
- * Club domestic league appearances and goals

Orestes Pérez Naranjo (born 7 July 1947) is a retired Cuban footballer. He played as a midfielder for Granjeros throughout the late 1960s and the 1970s. He also represented Cuba throughout the first half of the 1970s, being part of the winning squad for the 1970 Central American and Caribbean Games and playing in the 1971 CONCACAF Championship.

== Club career ==
Pérez began his career through being tutored by manager Preciliano Montesino until he was 14 years of age. Later, during his studies at the Escuela de Profesores de Educación Física where his talents were discovered by talent scout Manuel Piti Fajardo to play in Curaçao. His success there would earn him his first professional contract with Granjeros in 1965 where he would remain for the next decade.

== International career ==
Like many players of the Cuban golden generation, Pérez was first called up for the 166 Central American and Caribbean Games where the club won bronze. The following 1970 Central American and Caribbean Games saw the Diablos Rojos won their first title. He then went on to play in the 1974 Central American and Caribbean Games, the 1971 Pan American Games where Cuba won bronze, the 1971 CONCACAF Championship and the 1975 Pan American Games.

== Personal life ==
Pérez was born in Florida, being one of four distinguished athletes from the city alongside Ricardo Camejo, Francisco Ramos and Félix Eugelles.
