= Tiquinho =

Tiquinho is a nickname. It may refer to:

- Tiquinho (footballer, born 1956), Onofre Aluísio Batista, Brazilian football forward
- Tiquinho (footballer, born 1985), Fábio André da Silva Ferraz, Angolan football winger
- Tiquinho Soares (born 1991), Francisco das Chagas Soares dos Santos, Brazilian football forward
- Tiquinho (footballer, born 1995), Erikson Carlos Batista dos Santos, Brazilian football forward

== See also ==
- Toquinho (born 1946), Antônio Pecci Filho, Brazilian singer and guitarist
