= Héctor Tapia (Mexican footballer) =

Mexican footballer (born 1957)

Personal information
- Date of birth: 11 July 1957 (age 69)
- Place of birth: Mexico City, Mexico
- Position: Forward

Senior career*
Years	Team	Apps	(Gls)
1976–1979	Cruz Azul	37	(1)
1979–1981	Coyotes Neza	90	(12)
1981–1984	América	67	(4)
1984–1985	Necaxa	22	(2)
1985–1986	Atlético Potosino	?	(?)
1986–1987	Ángeles de Puebla	25	(2)
1988–1989	Irapuato	25	(2)

International career
1979–1980	Mexico	8	(0)
Medal record
Pan American Games
Gold medal – first place	1975 Mexico City	Team competition
- * Club domestic league appearances and goals

Héctor Tapia (born 11 July 1957) is a Mexican former footballer. He competed in the men's tournament at the 1976 Summer Olympics and won a gold medal in football at the 1975 Pan American Games.

== Honours ==
Cruz Azul

- Mexican Primera Division: 1978–79

América

- Mexican Primera Division: 1983–84
