= Ray Telford =

Canadian soccer player

Personal information
- Date of birth: 23 November 1946 (age 79)
- Place of birth: Newcastle upon Tyne, England
- Height: 5 ft 8 in (1.73 m)
- Position: Defender

Senior career*
Years	Team	Apps	(Gls)
- Nanaimo United

International career
1976	Canada Olympic	2	(0)
- * Club domestic league appearances and goals

Raymond D. Telford (born 23 November 1946) is a Canadian former soccer player who competed at the 1976 Summer Olympics. He also represented Canada at the 1971 and 1975 Pan American Games. He moved to Nanaimo, British Columbia from England when he was eighteen years old.
