= Marcelo Oliveira =

Brazilian footballer and manager

Personal information
- Full name: Marcelo de Oliveira Santos
- Date of birth: 4 March 1955 (age 71)
- Place of birth: Pedro Leopoldo, Brazil
- Height: 1.70 m (5 ft 7 in)
- Position: Attacking midfielder

Youth career
- 1969–1972: Atlético Mineiro

Senior career*
| Years | Team | Apps | (Gls) |
| 1972–1984 | Atlético Mineiro | 88 | (17) |
| 1979–1983 | → Botafogo (loan) | 36 | (6) |
| 1983 | → Nacional (loan) | | |
| 1984 | Desportiva Ferroviária | | |
| 1985 | América Mineiro | | |

International career
| 1975 | Brazil U23 | | |
| 1975–1977 | Brazil | 6 | (1) |

Managerial career
- 2003–2007: Atlético Mineiro (youth)
- 2007: CRB
- 2008: Atlético Mineiro (assistant)
- 2008: Atlético Mineiro (interim)
- 2008: Atlético Mineiro
- 2009: Ipatinga
- 2010: Paraná
- 2011–2012: Coritiba
- 2012: Vasco da Gama
- 2013–2015: Cruzeiro
- 2015–2016: Palmeiras
- 2016: Atlético Mineiro
- 2017: Coritiba
- 2018: Fluminense
- 2020: Ponte Preta
Medal record
Brazil
Pan American Games
| Gold medal – first place | 1975 Caracas | Team |
- * Club domestic league appearances and goals

Marcelo de Oliveira Santos (born 4 March 1955) is a Brazilian professional football manager and former player.

== Playing career ==
=== Club ===
Born in Pedro Leopoldo, Minas Gerais, he was known as Marcelo during his playing days, and was an Atlético Mineiro youth graduate. Promoted to the first team in 1972, he went on to play seven seasons for the club before joining Botafogo in 1979.

In 1984, after a short period at Uruguay's Nacional, Oliveira returned to Atlético. He subsequently represented Desportiva Ferroviária and América Mineiro, retiring with the latter in 1985.

=== International ===
Oliveira represented Brazil at under-23 level during the 1975 Pan American Games. He was included in Osvaldo Brandão's list ahead of the 1975 Copa América, and made his debut for the full side on 30 July by starting in a 4–0 home routing of Venezuela.

== Managerial career ==
After a period as a sports commentator on Rede Minas, Oliveira began his coaching career at first club Atletico's youth setup. In December 2007, he was named CRB manager.

In May 2008, Oliveira – who was acting as an assistant – was appointed interim manager of Atlético, replacing Geninho. After the arrival of Alexandre Gallo he returned to his previous duties, but as the latter was dismissed in July, he was appointed manager; he avoided relegation with the club, but was still released in December.

On 8 December 2009, after a spell at Ipatinga, Oliveira was appointed manager of Paraná. He was dismissed the following 3 October after a 6–1 loss to Portuguesa, and took over Coritiba on 18 November.

In his first year at Coxa, Oliveira reached the finals of the Copa do Brasil, lost to Vasco da Gama. He was sacked on 6 September 2012, after a poor run of form.

On 12 September 2012, Oliveira was named at the helm of Vasco, but was fired only two months later. On 3 December he was appointed Cruzeiro manager, and managed to win two consecutive Campeonato Brasileiro Série A titles.

On 2 June 2015, Oliveira was relieved from his duties, after being knocked out of the year's Copa Libertadores. Thirteen days later, he was named manager of Palmeiras, and won the 2015 Copa do Brasil.

Sacked on 10 March 2016, Oliveira returned to Atlético on 20 May. He managed to reach the finals of the 2016 Copa do Brasil, but after a defeat to eventual champions Grêmio in the first leg, he was fired.

On 25 July 2017 Oliveira returned to Coritiba, but left the club after failing to avoid relegation. On 22 June of the following year, he replaced Abel Braga at the helm of Fluminense, leaving on 29 November after being knocked out of the year's Copa Sudamericana and being threatened with relegation.

== Personal life ==
Marcelo Oliveira is married and is Roman Catholic.

== Honours ==
=== Player ===
==== Club ====
Atlético Mineiro

- Taça Minas Gerais: 1975, 1976
- Campeonato Mineiro: 1976, 1978, 1979, 1983
- Copa dos Campeões da Copa Brasil: 1978

Desportiva

- Campeonato Capixaba: 1984

==== International ====
Brazil U23

- Pan American Games: 1975

=== Manager ===
Coritiba

- Campeonato Paranaense: 2011, 2012

Cruzeiro

- Campeonato Brasileiro Série A: 2013, 2014
- Campeonato Mineiro: 2014

Palmeiras

- Copa do Brasil: 2015
