= Juan Manuel Azuara =

Mexican footballer (born 1957)

Personal information
- Full name: Juan Manuel Azuara González
- Date of birth: 20 October 1957 (age 69)
- Place of birth: Ciudad Valles, San Luis Potosí, Mexico
- Position: Forward

Senior career*
Years	Team	Apps	(Gls)
1976–1977	Monterrey		
1977–1978	Atlético Potosino		
1978–1982	Tigres UANL		
1982–1983	Tampico Madero		
1983–1984	Atlético Morelia		

International career
1980–1981	Mexico	6	(0)
- * Club domestic league appearances and goals

Juan Manuel Azuara González (born 20 October 1957) is a retired Mexican footballer. Nicknamed "El Abuelo", he played as a forward for Tigres UANL and various other clubs throughout the late 1970s and the early 1980s. He also represented Mexico throughout various friendlies in 1980 and 1981.

== Club career ==
Azuara began his career with Monterrey for their 1976–77 season however this would be a brief spell as he soon found himself playing with his home provincial club of Atlético Potosino for the following 1977–78 season. Despite his career with Potosino also being brief, he would find stability with Tigres UANL for their 1978–79 season. Immediately, Azuara's debut season for Tigres saw him score the club's first ever hat trick through scoring three consecutive goals against Toluca that ended in a 3–3 draw. By the end of the season, Azuara scored 24 goals during the 1978–79 Mexican Primera División, tying with Osvaldo Castro of Jalisco for 2nd place and shy of 3 goals from the top scorers of the tournament Cabinho and Hugo Sánchez, both of whom were playing for Pumas UNAM. His biggest achievement with the club came during the 1981–82 season where, under Carlos Miloc, won their second national title. Despite this achievement, he chose to spend the following two seasons with Tampico Madero and Atlético Morelia before retiring prematurely.

== Later life ==
Following his retirement as a player, Azuara became a fan of his former club of Tigres, being seen with high esteem alongside other figures such as Osvaldo Batocletti and Carlos Miloc.
