= Carlos García (footballer, born 1957) =

Mexican footballer

Personal information
- Full name: Carlos García Cuevas
- Date of birth: 3 July 1957 (age 69)

International career
Years	Team	Apps	(Gls)
- Mexico
Medal record
Pan American Games
Gold medal – first place	1975 Mexico City	Team competition

Carlos García Cuevas (born 3 July 1957) is a Mexican former footballer. He competed in the men's tournament at the 1976 Summer Olympics and won a gold medal in football at the 1975 Pan American Games.
