= Robin Megraw =

English-born Canadian soccer player

Personal information
- Date of birth: 9 August 1950 (age 76)
- Place of birth: Liverpool, England
- Height: 5 ft 11 in (1.80 m)
- Position: Defender

Senior career*
Years	Team	Apps	(Gls)
1966–1969	Oshawa Imperials		
1970	Toronto Ukrainians		
1971–1973	Toronto City		
1973–1976	Toronto First Portuguese		
1977	Toronto Metros-Croatia	4	(0)
1979	Toronto Blizzard	1	(0)

International career
1975–1976	Canada Olympics	8	(0)
- * Club domestic league appearances and goals

Robin Megraw (born 9 August 1950) is a Canadian former soccer player who competed at the 1976 Summer Olympics.

== Career ==
In 1966, Megraw played with Oshawa Imperials for three seasons. In 1970, he played in the National Soccer League with Toronto Ukrainians, and later with Toronto City. In 1973, he moved to Toronto First Portuguese of the NSL. In 1977, he played in the North American Soccer League with Toronto Metros-Croatia, and later with Toronto Blizzard. During his tenure with the Blizzards he sustained an injury which shortened his career, and subsequently managed the Oshawa Kicks.

In 1991, he was inducted into the Oshawa Sports Hall of Fame.

== International career ==
Megraw represented Canada at the 1975 Pan American Games and the 1976 Summer Olympics.
