= 1976 Campeonato Carioca =

Campeonato Carioca
- Season: 1976
- Champions: Fluminense
- Copa Brasil: Vasco da Gama; Flamengo; Fluminense; América; Botafogo; Americano; Goytacaz; Volta Redonda
- Matches: 211
- Goals: 501 (2.37 per match)
- Top goalscorer: Doval (Fluminense) - 20 goals
- Biggest home win: Botafogo 7-1 Americano (August 11, 1976)
- Biggest away win: São Cristóvão 1-7 Botafogo (March 20, 1976); Portuguesa 0-6 América (April 3, 1976)
- Highest scoring: Botafogo 7-1 Americano (August 11, 1976); São Cristóvão 1-7 Botafogo (March 20, 1976)

The 1976 edition of the Campeonato Carioca kicked off on March 13, 1976 and ended on October 3, 1976. It was organized by FCF (Federação Carioca de Futebol, or Carioca Football Federation). This was the first edition of the championship after the incorporation of Guanabara state by Rio de Janeiro, and as such, the habitual twelve teams were joined by three invitees from the Fluminense championship: Americano, Goytacaz and Volta Redonda, with these being the first teams from outside Rio de Janeiro city to participate in the Carioca championship ever since Canto do Rio had left the league in 1964. Fluminense won the title for the 23rd time. no teams were relegated.

== System ==
The tournament would be divided in four stages:

- Taça Guanabara: The fifteen teams all played in a single round-robin format against each other. The champions qualified to the Final phase.
- Second round: The fifteen teams were divided into two groups, the "winners' group" (Taça José Wânder Rodrigues Mendes) with the best eight teams and the "losers' group" (Taça Josadibe Jappour) with the worst seven teams. each team played in a single round-robin format against the teams of its own group. In the winners' group, the best team qualified to the Final phase, while the worst was relegated into the losers' group for the Third round. In the losers' group, the best team joined the other teams of the winners' group for the Third round.
- Third round: The format for this stage was the same as in the second round, except that the winners of both groups qualified to the Final phase.
- Final phase: The remaining four teams played in a single round-robin format against each other. the team with the most points won the title.

== Championship ==
=== First round ===
==== Taça Guanabara ====
Pos	Team	Pld	W	D	L	GF	GA	GD	Pts	Qualification or relegation
1	Flamengo	14	11	2	1	28	5	+23	24	Playoffs
2	Vasco da Gama	14	11	2	1	28	8	+20	24	Playoffs
3	Fluminense	14	10	3	1	33	12	+21	23	Taça José Wânder Rodrigues Mendes
4	América	14	9	4	1	31	9	+22	22	Taça José Wânder Rodrigues Mendes
5	Goytacaz	14	4	7	3	12	23	−11	15	Taça José Wânder Rodrigues Mendes
6	Olaria	14	3	8	3	7	9	−2	14	Taça José Wânder Rodrigues Mendes
7	Botafogo	14	5	3	6	18	15	+3	13	Taça José Wânder Rodrigues Mendes
8	Volta Redonda	14	4	5	5	13	15	−2	13	Taça José Wânder Rodrigues Mendes
9	Americano	14	4	5	5	10	14	−4	13	Taça Josadibe Jappour
10	Bonsucesso	14	3	5	6	12	16	−4	11	Taça Josadibe Jappour
11	São Cristóvão	14	2	7	5	14	21	−7	11	Taça Josadibe Jappour
12	Campo Grande	14	2	4	8	9	18	−9	8	Taça Josadibe Jappour
13	Madureira	14	2	4	8	8	21	−13	8	Taça Josadibe Jappour
14	Bangu	14	0	6	8	8	20	−12	6	Taça Josadibe Jappour
15	Portuguesa	14	1	3	10	7	32	−25	5	Taça Josadibe Jappour

Updated to match(es) played on May 16, 1976. Source: RSSSF.com
Rules for classification: 1) points; 2) goal difference; 3) wins; 4) number of goals scored.

==== Playoffs ====
Team 1	Score	Team 2
Vasco da Gama	1–1 (5-4 pen.)	Flamengo

=== Second round ===
==== Taça José Wânder Rodrigues Mendes ====
Pos	Team	Pld	W	D	L	GF	GA	GD	Pts	Qualification or relegation
1	Botafogo	7	6	1	0	11	2	+9	13	Qualified to Final phase
2	Fluminense	7	5	1	1	16	8	+8	11	
3	Flamengo	7	4	2	1	11	5	+6	10	
4	Vasco da Gama	7	3	1	3	9	13	−4	7	
5	Volta Redonda	7	1	2	4	3	6	−3	4	
6	Olaria	7	1	2	4	7	11	−4	4	
7	Goytacaz	7	0	4	3	6	10	−4	4	
8	América	7	1	1	5	4	12	−8	3	Taça Jayme de Carvalho

Updated to match(es) played on July 18, 1976. Source: RSSSF.com
Rules for classification: 1) points; 2) goal difference; 3) wins; 4) number of goals scored.

==== Taça Josadibe Jappour ====
Pos	Team	Pld	W	D	L	GF	GA	GD	Pts	Qualification or relegation
1	Americano	6	4	1	1	10	5	+5	9	Taça Amadeu Rodrigues Sequeira
2	Portuguesa	6	3	3	0	8	4	+4	9	
3	Madureira	6	3	3	0	6	2	+4	9	
4	Bonsucesso	6	2	2	2	7	5	+2	6	
5	São Cristóvão	6	1	1	4	7	8	−1	3	
6	Campo Grande	6	1	1	4	4	11	−7	3	
7	Bangu	6	1	1	4	4	11	−7	3	

Updated to match(es) played on July 18, 1976. Source: RSSSF.com
Rules for classification: 1) points; 2) goal difference; 3) wins; 4) number of goals scored.

=== Third round ===
==== Taça Amadeu Rodrigues Sequeira ====
Pos	Team	Pld	W	D	L	GF	GA	GD	Pts	Qualification or relegation
1	Fluminense	7	6	1	0	20	4	+16	13	Qualified to Final phase
2	Flamengo	7	5	1	1	18	8	+10	11	
3	Vasco da Gama	7	3	2	2	9	7	+2	8	
4	Americano	7	3	1	3	9	13	−4	7	
5	Olaria	7	1	3	3	5	9	−4	5	
6	Goytacaz	7	2	1	4	5	12	−7	5	
7	Botafogo	7	1	2	4	11	12	−1	4	
8	Volta Redonda	7	0	3	4	8	20	−12	3	

Updated to match(es) played on August 15, 1976. Source: RSSSF.com
Rules for classification: 1) points; 2) goal difference; 3) wins; 4) number of goals scored.

==== Taça Jayme de Carvalho ====
Pos	Team	Pld	W	D	L	GF	GA	GD	Pts	Qualification or relegation
1	América	6	5	1	0	12	2	+10	11	Qualified to Final phase
2	Madureira	6	4	0	2	8	5	+3	8	
3	Bonsucesso	6	2	2	2	8	8	0	6	
4	Portuguesa	6	1	3	2	6	7	−1	5	
5	Bangu	6	1	3	2	7	12	−5	5	
6	São Cristóvão	6	2	0	4	4	8	−4	4	
7	Campo Grande	6	0	3	3	5	8	−3	3	

Updated to match(es) played on August 14, 1976. Source: RSSSF.com
Rules for classification: 1) points; 2) goal difference; 3) wins; 4) number of goals scored.

=== Final phase ===
Pos	Team	Pld	W	D	L	GF	GA	GD	Pts	Qualification or relegation
1	Fluminense	3	1	2	0	4	2	+2	4	Playoffs
2	Vasco da Gama	3	1	2	0	4	3	+1	4	Playoffs
3	América	3	1	1	1	4	3	+1	3	
4	Botafogo	3	0	1	2	0	4	−4	1	

Updated to match(es) played on July 18, 1976. Source: RSSSF.com
Rules for classification: 1) points; 2) goal difference; 3) wins; 4) number of goals scored.

==== Playoffs ====
3 October 1976
Final

Fluminense	1 – 0 (a.e.t.)	Vasco da Gama
Doval 119'

Maracanã, Rio de Janeiro
Attendance: 127,052
Referee: Armando Marques

== Top Scorer ==
Rank	Player	Club	Goals
1	Narciso Doval	Fluminense	20
2	Gil	Fluminense	19
3	Zico	Flamengo	18
3	Luisinho Lemos	Flamengo	18
3	Dé	Vasco da Gama	18
6	Roberto Dinamite	Vasco da Gama	15
7	Expedito	América	12
8	Orlando	América	11
8	Rivellino	Fluminense	11
8	Zé Neto	Goytacaz	11
11	Manfrini	Botafogo	10
