= Eudes (footballer) =

Brazilian footballer (born 1955)

Personal information
- Full name: Eudes Lacerda Medeiros
- Date of birth: 8 April 1955 (age 71)
- Place of birth: São Paulo, Brazil
- Height: 1.75 m (5 ft 9 in)
- Position: Midfielder

International career
Years	Team	Apps	(Gls)
- Brazil Olympic
Medal record
Pan American Games
Gold medal – first place	1975 Mexico City	Team competition

Eudes Lacerda Medeiros (born 8 April 1955), known as Eudes, is a Brazilian former footballer who played as a midfielder. He competed in the men's tournament at the 1976 Summer Olympics and won a gold medal in football at the 1975 Pan American Games.
