= Tiquinho (footballer, born 1956) =

Brazilian footballer

Personal information
- Full name: Onofre Aluísio Batista
- Date of birth: 7 January 1956
- Place of birth: Rio de Janeiro, Brazil
- Date of death: 15 June 2009 (aged 53)
- Place of death: Maracanaú, Brazil
- Position: Forward

Youth career
- 1974–1975: Botafogo

Senior career*
Years	Team	Apps	(Gls)
1975–1980	Botafogo		
1976	→ Treze (loan)		
1978–1979	→ Ceará (loan)		
1980	Remo		
1981	Fortaleza		
1982	Ceará		
1982–1984	Rio Negro-AM		
1985	Marília		
1986	Nacional-AM		
1989	Ríver		

International career
1975–1976	Brazil Olympic	4	(1)
Medal record
Men's Football
Representing Brazil
Pan American Games
Winner	1975 Mexico City
- * Club domestic league appearances and goals as of 24 November 2023

Onofre Aluísio Batista (7 January 1956 – 15 June 2009), better known as Tiquinho, was a Brazilian professional footballer who played as a forward.

== Career ==
Son of the player Sabará, Tiquinho started his career at Botafogo, at a time when the club was experiencing problems with the quality of its squad. Loaned to Ceará, he became one of the main players in the 1978 title, scoring the decisive goal of the campaign. He played 139 games for the club and scored 37 goals.

== International career ==
Tiquinho was part of the Olympic team of Brazil in 1975, being gold medal of the 1975 Pan American Games (alongside Mexico).

== Honours ==
Brazil Olympic

- Pan American Games: (gold) 1975
- CONMEBOL Pre-Olympic Tournament: 1976

Ceará

- Campeonato Cearense: 1978

Rio Negro-AM

- Campeonato Amazonense: 1982

== Death ==
Tiquinho died in the city of Maracanaú, Ceará, on 15 June 2009, due to problems with alcoholism.
