= Tecão =

Brazilian footballer

Personal information
- Full name: Roberto Franqueira
- Date of birth: 10 May 1952 (age 74)
- Place of birth: São Paulo, Brazil
- Position: Centre-back

Youth career
- –1974: Noroeste

Senior career*
Years	Team	Apps	(Gls)
1975	Saad		
1975–1979	São Paulo	101	(2)
1980	Santa Cruz		
1981	Coritiba		
1982–1984	Bangu		
1985–1986	America (RJ)		

International career
1975–1976	Brazil Olympic	22	(0)
Medal record
Pan American Games
Gold medal – first place	1975 Mexico City	Team competition
- * Club domestic league appearances and goals

Roberto Franqueira (born 10 May 1952), known as Tecão, is a Brazilian former footballer who played as a centre-back. He competed in the men's tournament at the 1976 Summer Olympics and won a gold medal in football at the 1975 Pan American Games.
