= Guillermo Cosio =

Mexican footballer (born 1958)

Personal information
- Date of birth: 15 September 1958 (age 68)

International career
Years	Team	Apps	(Gls)
- Mexico
Medal record
Pan American Games
Gold medal – first place	1975 Mexico City	Team competition

Guillermo Cosio (born 15 September 1958) is a Mexican former footballer. He competed in the men's tournament at the 1976 Summer Olympics and won a gold medal in football at the 1975 Pan American Games.
