= Francis Meynieu =

French footballer (born 1953)

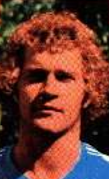
- Meynieu with Bordeaux in the 1975–76 season

Personal information
- Date of birth: 9 January 1953 (age 73)
- Place of birth: Bordeaux, France
- Position: Defender

Senior career*
Years	Team	Apps	(Gls)
1971–1980	Bordeaux		
1980–1983	Tours		

International career
1976	France	1	(0)
- * Club domestic league appearances and goals

Francis Meynieu (born 9 January 1953) is a French former professional footballer who played as a defender.
