= Carlos Gallo =

Brazilian footballer (born 1956)

Personal information
- Full name: Carlos Roberto Rocha Gallo
- Date of birth: 4 March 1956 (age 70)
- Place of birth: Vinhedo, Brazil
- Height: 1.88 m (6 ft 2 in)
- Position: Goalkeeper

Youth career
- 1972–1974: Ponte Preta

Senior career*
Years	Team	Apps	(Gls)
1975–1983	Ponte Preta	437	(0)
1984–1988	Corinthians	159	(0)
1988–1989	Malatyaspor	0	(0)
1990–1991	Atlético Mineiro	45	(0)
1991	Guarani	32	(0)
1992	Palmeiras	36	(0)
1993	Portuguesa	2	(0)

International career
1975–1993	Brazil	44	(0)
1976	Brazil Olympic	5	(0)
Medal record
Pan American Games
Gold medal – first place	1975 Mexico City	Team competition
- * Club domestic league appearances and goals

Carlos Roberto Rocha Gallo (born 4 March 1956), known as Carlos, is a Brazilian former professional footballer who played as a goalkeeper. He competed in the men's tournament at the 1976 Summer Olympics and won a gold medal in football at the 1975 Pan American Games.

== Club career ==
In a club career which spanned from 1974 to 1993, Carlos Gallo played for Ponte Preta, Corinthians, Atlético Mineiro, Guarani, Palmeiras, Portuguesa and Malatyaspor (1988–1989) in Turkey. He won two Brazilian Silver Ball Awards.

== International career ==
At international level, Carlos Gallo played 44 matches for the Brazil national team, between 1976 and June 1993, and was selected for the 1978, 1982 and 1986 FIFA World Cup tournaments, playing in the latter edition of the competition. He conceded only one goal in the five World Cup games Brazil played in 1986.

== Honours ==
Corinthans

- Campeonato Paulista: 1988

Brazil

- Pan American Games: 1975
- CONMEBOL Pre-Olympic Tournament: 1976
