= Sergio Fortunato =

Argentine footballer

Personal information
- Full name: Sergio Elio Ángel Fortunato
- Date of birth: 23 October 1956 (age 70)
- Place of birth: Mar del Plata, Argentina
- Height: 1.77 m (5 ft 10 in)
- Position: Forward

Senior career*
Years	Team	Apps	(Gls)
1972	San Lorenzo (Mar del Plata)	17	(0)
1973	CA Kimberley	10	(3)
1974	Aldosivi	11	(0)
1975–1976	Racing Club	38	(12)
1977	Quilmes	55	(20)
1978–1980	Estudiantes	68	(42)
1980–1981	Perugia	12	(2)
1981–1983	Las Palmas	32	(4)
1983–1984	Favoritner AC	26	(11)
1984	Estudiantes	32	(14)
1985–1986	Aldosivi		
1986–1987	San Lorenzo (Mar del Plata)		

International career
1979	Argentina U23		(3)
1979	Argentina	5	(0)
- * Club domestic league appearances and goals

Sergio Elio Ángel Fortunato (born 23 October 1956) is an Argentine former footballer. He was capped by the Argentina national team in 1979.

== Career statistics ==
=== International ===
National team	Year	Apps	Goals
Argentina	1979	5	0
Total		5	0
