= Rosemiro =

Brazilian footballer

Personal information
- Full name: Rosemiro Correia de Souza
- Date of birth: 22 February 1954 (age 72)
- Place of birth: Belém, Brazil
- Height: 1.76 m (5 ft 9 in)
- Position: Right-back

International career
Years	Team	Apps	(Gls)
1976	Brazil Olympic		
Medal record
Pan American Games
Gold medal – first place	1975 Mexico City	Team competition

Rosemiro Correia de Souza (born 22 February 1954), known as Rosemiro, is a Brazilian former footballer who played as a right-back. He competed in the men's tournament at the 1976 Summer Olympics and won a gold medal in football at the 1975 Pan American Games.

== Honours ==
Remo

- Campeonato Paraense: 1973, 1974, 1975

Palmeiras

- Campeonato Paulista: 1976
- Campeonato Brasileiro runner-up: 1978

Vasco da Gama

- Campeonato Carioca: 1982

Brazil

- Pan American Games: 1975
