= Vicente Wanchope =

Costa Rican footballer (born 1946)

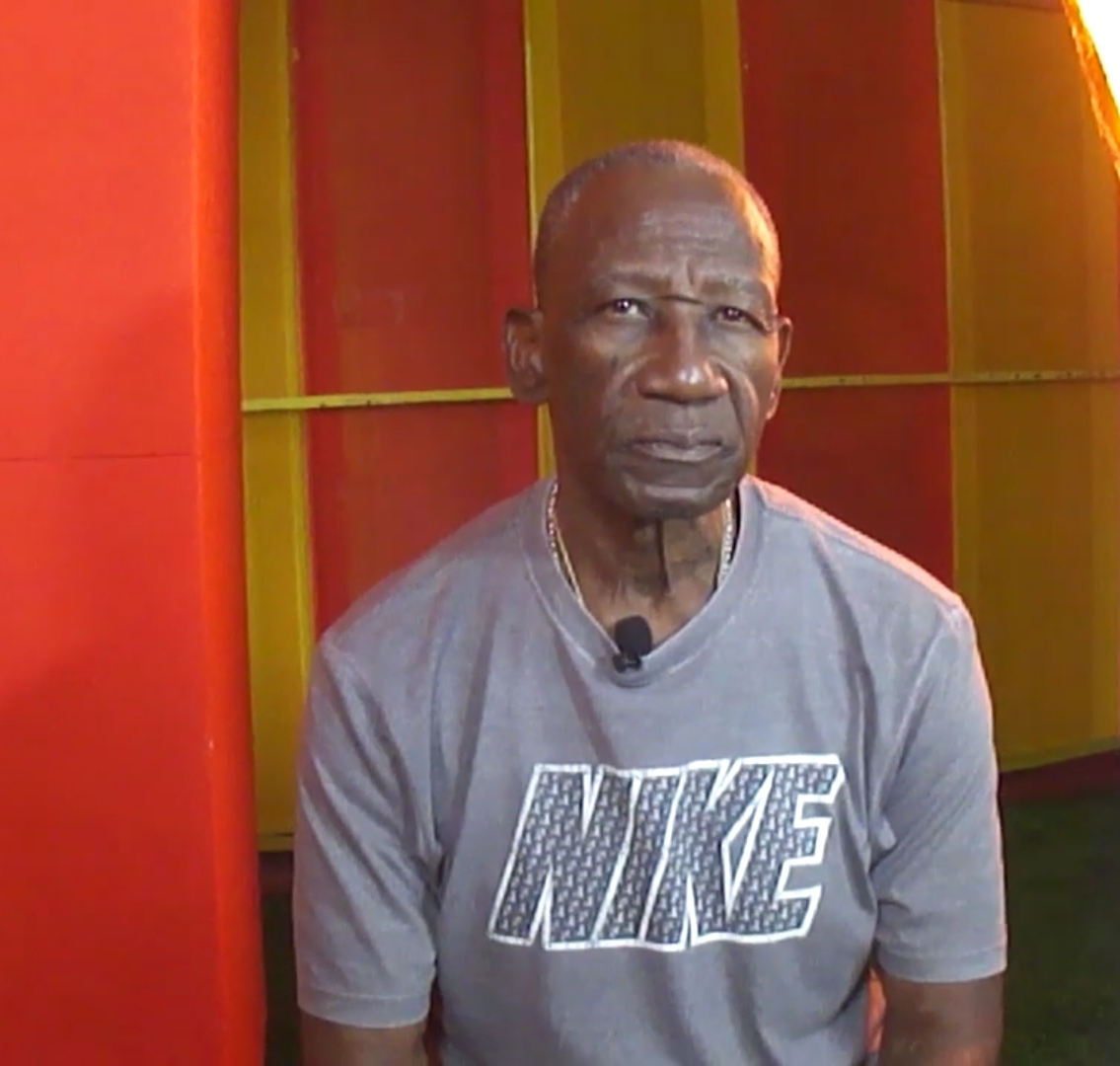
- Wanchope in 2020

Personal information
- Full name: Vicente Wanchope Kelly
- Date of birth: 19 July 1946 (age 80)
- Place of birth: Limón, Costa Rica
- Position: Striker

Youth career
- Rafael Iglesias de Puerto Limón

Senior career*
Years	Team	Apps	(Gls)
1964–1969	Limonense		(54)
1969–1977	Herediano		
1978	Barrio México		
Total		-	(133)

International career^{‡}
1969–1975	Costa Rica	15	(3)
- * Club domestic league appearances and goals as of 30 December 2014 ‡ National team caps and goals as of 30 December 2014

Vicente Wanchope Kelly (born 19 July 1946) is a Costa Rican former footballer, who played most of his career at striker with Herediano.

== Club career ==
Wanchope started his career at Limonense, for whom he scored a club record 54 goals, before moving to Herediano in 1969, a transfer which caused controversy because of an exorbitant high fee involved. He finished his career at Barrio México. Wanchope totalled 133 goals in the Costa Rica Primera División.

== International career ==
Nicknamed La Gacela Negra (the Black Gazelle), he made his debut for Costa Rica in 1969 and earned 15 caps, scoring 3 goals. He represented Costa Rica at the 1975 Pan American Games in Mexico.

== Personal life ==
Born in Jamaica, Wanchope is of Jamaican descent. He is married to Patricia Watson and was the first famous Wanchope football player to emerge in Costa Rica, followed by his three sons Javier, Paulo, and Carlos. After retiring, he worked for ICE in Colima de Tibás. His younger brother is Carlos Watson, former footballer and manager.
