= Rafael Toribio =

Mexican footballer (born 1958)

Personal information
- Full name: Rafael Toribio Arzate
- Date of birth: 21 August 1958 (age 68)
- Place of birth: Mexico City, Mexico
- Height: 1.72 m (5 ft 8 in)
- Position: Midfielder

Youth career
- Cruz Azul

Senior career*
Years	Team	Apps	(Gls)
1976–1986	Cruz Azul		
1986–1988	Ángeles de Puebla		

International career
1976	Mexico	3	(0)
Medal record
CONCACAF Youth Tournament
Gold medal – first place	1974 Canada	Team
Pan American Games
Gold medal – first place	1975 Mexico	Team
CONCACAF Pre-Olympic Tournament
Gold medal – first place	1976 CONCACAF	Team
- * Club domestic league appearances and goals

Rafael Toribio Arzate (born 21 August 1958) is a Mexican former footballer. He competed in the men's tournament at the 1976 Summer Olympics and won a gold medal in football at the 1975 Pan American Games.

== Honours ==
Cruz Azul

- Mexican Primera División: 1978–79, 1979–80

Mexico U23

- Pan American Games: 1975
- CONCACAF Pre-Olympic Tournament: 1976

Mexico U20

- CONCACAF Youth Tournament: 1974
