= José Luis Ceballos =

Argentine footballer

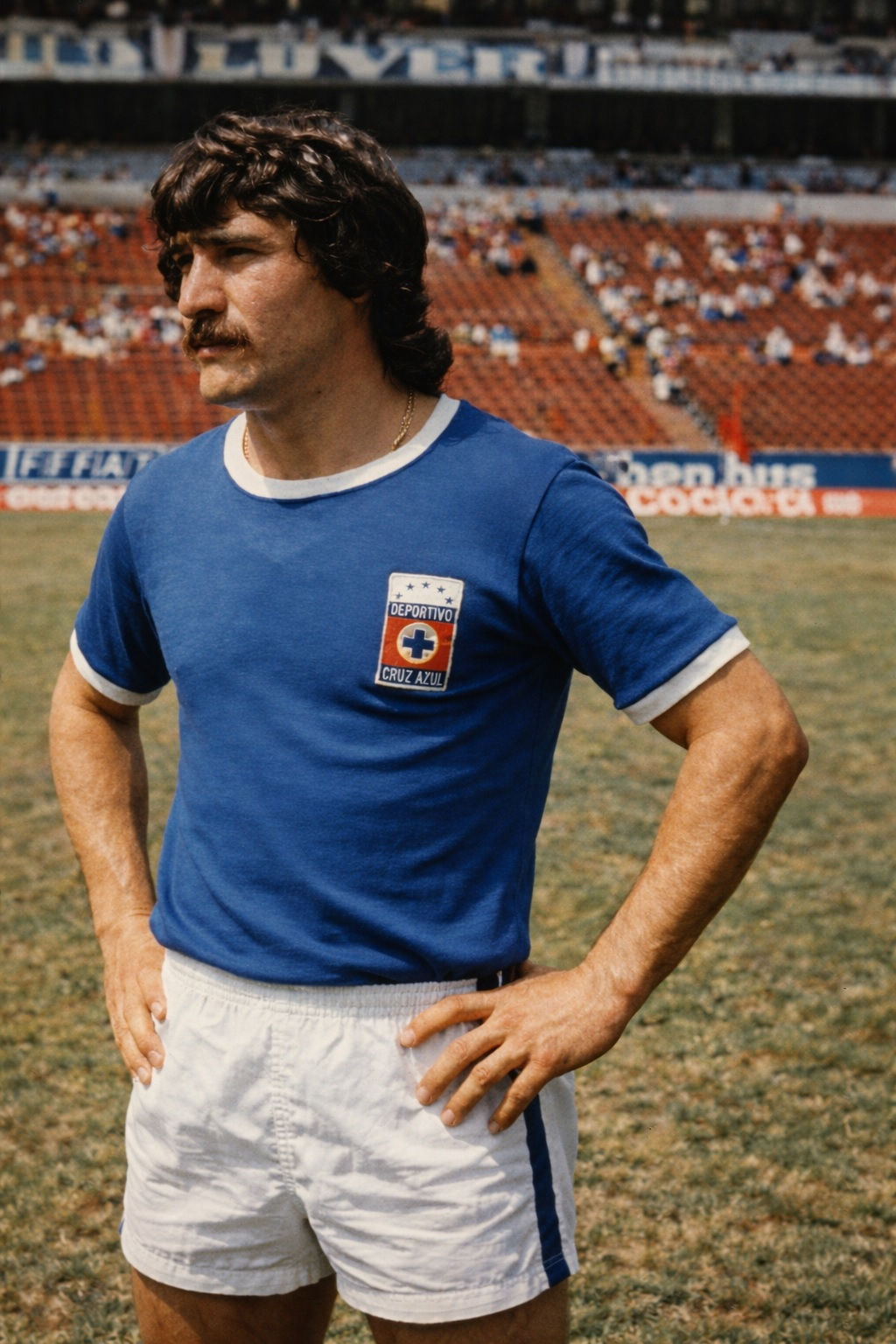
- Ceballos in 1978

Personal information
- Date of birth: February 23, 1953 (age 73)
- Place of birth: Córdoba, Argentina

Senior career*
Years	Team	Apps	(Gls)
1973	Instituto	12	(2)
1974	Belgrano	15	(3)
1975	San Lorenzo	29	(0)
1976	Atlanta	9	(0)
1976–1977	Everton	58	(29)
1978	Cobreloa	21	(8)
1978–1980	Cruz Azul		
1980	Las Palmas	3	(0)
1981	San Lorenzo		
1981–1982	Neza		
1982–1984	Puebla		
1984–1985	Atlas		
1987	Everton	7	(1)
1988	San Luis		(4)

International career
1975	Argentina		
- * Club domestic league appearances and goals

José Luis Ceballos (born February 23, 1953) is an Argentine former professional footballer who played for clubs in Argentina, Chile, Mexico and Spain. He played for Argentina at the 1975 Pan American Games.

== Teams ==
- (Argentina) Instituto (1973)
- (Argentina) Belgrano (1974–1975)
- (Argentina) San Lorenzo (1975)
- (Argentina) Atlanta (1976)
- (Chile) Everton (1976–1977)
- (Chile) Cobreloa (1978)
- (Mexico) Cruz Azul (1978–1980)
- (Spain) Las Palmas (1980)
- (Argentina) San Lorenzo (1981)
- (Mexico) Neza (1981–1982)
- (Mexico) Puebla (1982–1983)
- (Mexico) Atlas (1984–1985)
- (Chile) Everton (1987)
- (Chile) San Luis (1988)

== Titles ==
- (Chile) Everton 1976 (Chilean Primera División Championship)
- (Mexico) Cruz Azul 1978–1979 and 1979–1980 (Primera División de México Championship)
