= Edval =

Brazilian footballer (born 1954)

Personal information
- Full name: Edval Therezino Costa
- Date of birth: 17 February 1954 (age 72)
- Place of birth: Rio de Janeiro, Brazil
- Height: 1.83 m (6 ft 0 in)
- Position: Forward

International career
| Years | Team | Apps | (Gls) |
- Brazil Olympic

Edval Therezino Costa (born 17 February 1954), known as Edval, is a Brazilian former footballer who played as a forward. He competed in the men's tournament at the 1976 Summer Olympics.
