= Santos (footballer, born 1955) =

Brazilian footballer

Personal information
- Full name: João José dos Santos
- Date of birth: 25 July 1955 (age 71)
- Place of birth: Recife, Brazil
- Height: 1.70 m (5 ft 7 in)

International career
Years	Team	Apps	(Gls)
- Brazil Olympic
Medal record
Pan American Games
Gold medal – first place	1975 Mexico City	Team competition

João José dos Santos (born 25 July 1955), known as Santos, is a Brazilian former footballer. He competed in the men's tournament at the 1976 Summer Olympics and won a gold medal in football at the 1975 Pan American Games.
