= Alberto Leguelé =

Brazilian footballer (1953–2025)

Personal information
- Full name: Alberto Raimundo Marques
- Date of birth: 28 February 1953
- Place of birth: Santo Amaro, Bahia, Brazil
- Date of death: 1 February 2025 (aged 71)
- Place of death: Santo Amaro, Bahia, Brazil
- Position: Midfielder

Senior career*
Years	Team	Apps	(Gls)
1971–1980	Bahia		
1978–1979	→ Flamengo (loan)		
1980	CSA		

International career
1975–1976	Brazil Olympic		
- * Club domestic league appearances and goals

Alberto Leguelé (28 February 1953 – 1 February 2025) was a Brazilian footballer who played as a midfielder. He competed in the men's tournament at the 1976 Summer Olympics.

Leguelé died in his hometown of Santo Amaro, on 1 February 2025, at the age of 71.

== Honours ==
Bahia

- Campeonato Baiano: 1971, 1973, 1974, 1975, 1976, 1977

CSA

- Campeonato Alagoano: 1980

Brazil Olympic

- Pan American Games: 1975
