= Mohammed Habib Benkada =

Algerian footballer (born 1950)

Habib Benkada
Personal information
- Full name: Mohammed Habib Benkada
- Date of birth: 5 August 1950 (age 76)
- Place of birth: Oran, Algeria
- Position: Centre-forward

Senior career*
Years	Team	Apps	(Gls)
1974–1976	CC Sig		
1976–1980	MC Oran		

International career
1975–1976	Algeria	10	(0)
- * Club domestic league appearances and goals

Mohammed Habib Benkada (born 5 August 1950) is an Algerian former footballer who played as a centre-forward during the 1970s. He represented CC Sig and MC Oran at club level and was selected for the Algeria national team between 1975 and 1976. Benkada was part of the Algerian squad that won the gold medal at the 1975 Mediterranean Games in Algiers.

== Early life and youth ==
Benkada was born in Oran and grew up in the nearby town of Sig where he began playing football with the local club (CC Sig). An instinctive striker, he was noted from an early age for his finishing, two-footed ability and flair — attributes that helped him stand out in regional competitions.

== Club career ==
After emerging with CC Sig, Benkada progressed through the regional divisions. During his national service he was noticed by Rachid Mekhloufi (then coaching the military national team), which helped raise his profile. He joined MC Oran in 1976 and established himself as a fast, intelligent centre-forward capable of linking play and scoring.

== International career ==
Benkada was first called up to the Algeria national team by Rachid Mekhloufi in 1975. His debut came on 19 May 1975 in Algiers against Újpest FC (Hungary). He earned international selections through 1976 and appeared in a number of official and friendly matches. Sources vary as to the exact number of caps: some databases list 10 appearances, while other contemporary records and reports indicate higher totals (as many as 19).

Benkada was a member of the Algerian squad that won the gold medal at the 1975 Mediterranean Games held in Algiers — a landmark achievement for Algerian football at the time.

== Notable performances ==
One of Benkada's most memorable appearances came in an international friendly tournament in Oran that featured clubs and selections such as Werder Bremen, Partizan Belgrade and Servette. He scored a brace against Werder Bremen in a 4–0 victory for the Algerian selection — a performance often recalled as emblematic of the attacking revival promoted by Mekhloufi.

== Later career and retirement ==
A serious knee injury interrupted Benkada's career and limited his playing time. After a spell with MC Oran in Algeria's top division he gradually retired from professional football. He retained public recognition for his contributions to the national team and for being part of the 1975 Mediterranean Games gold-medal squad.

== Honours ==
- Algeria
  - Mediterranean Games: Gold medal, Algiers 1975.
