= Chico Fraga =

Brazilian footballer (born 1954)

Personal information
- Full name: Francisco Fraga da Silva
- Date of birth: 2 October 1954 (age 72)
- Place of birth: Porto Alegre, Brazil
- Height: 1.74 m (5 ft 9 in)
- Positions: Left back; left winger

Senior career*
Years	Team	Apps	(Gls)
1975–1976	Internacional		
1977–1978	Náutico		
1978–1979	São Paulo	26	(0)
1980	Fluminense		
1980–1983	Colorado-PR		
1982	→ Joinville (loan)		
1983–1984	Sport Recife		
1984	Brasil de Pelotas		
1984–1985	XV de Jaú		
1985–1986	Sampaio Corrêa		
1986	Brasil de Pelotas		
1987	Guarani-VA		
1987	Aimoré		
1987–1988	Guarany-CA		
1988	Guarani-VA		

International career
1975–1976	Brazil Olympic		
Medal record
Pan American Games
Gold medal – first place	1975 Mexico City	Team competition
- * Club domestic league appearances and goals

Francisco Fraga da Silva (born 2 October 1954), known as Chico Fraga, is a Brazilian former footballer who played as a left back and left winger. He competed in the men's tournament at the 1976 Summer Olympics and won a gold medal in football at the 1975 Pan American Games.

== Honours ==
Internacional

- Campeonato Brasileiro: 1975, 1976
- Campeonato Gaúcho: 1975, 1976

Fluminense

- Campeonato Carioca: 1980

Brazil Olympic

- 1975 Pan American Games: (gold) Gold medal
