= Manfrini =

Brazilian footballer (1950–2025)

Personal information
- Full name: Antônio Monfrini Neto
- Date of birth: 23 June 1950
- Place of birth: São Paulo, Brazil
- Date of death: 10 December 2025 (aged 75)
- Place of death: São Paulo, Brazil
- Position: Midfielder

Youth career
- Parque da Mooca

Senior career*
Years	Team	Apps	(Gls)
1967–1972	Ponte Preta		
1972–1973	Palmeiras		
1973–1975	Fluminense	157	(62)
1976–1979	Botafogo		
1980–1981	Juventus-SP		
1981	Moto Club		
- * Club domestic league appearances and goals

Antônio Monfrini Neto (23 June 1950 – 10 December 2025), better known as Manfrini, was a Brazilian professional footballer who played as a midfielder.

== Career ==
Born in the Mooca neighborhood, São Paulo, Manfrini began his career in the amateurs at Parque da Mooca. As a professional, he began his career at Ponte Preta, a club he played for from 1967 to 1972. He had a brief spell at Palmeiras, without being able to establish himself, and in 1973, he joined Fluminense, where he won the Rio de Janeiro championship in 1973 and 1975. He also played for Botafogo, Ituano and Moto Club. Although his surname was called "Monfrini", a graphic error in the documentation transformed him into Manfrini, which became his nickname in football circles.

== Death ==
Manfrini died in São Paulo on 10 December 2025, at the age of 75.

== Honours ==
Fluminense

- Campeonato Carioca: 1973, 1975
