= Jorge López (footballer, born 1957) =

Mexican footballer

Personal information
- Date of birth: 14 August 1957 (age 69)

Senior career*
Years	Team	Apps	(Gls)
1976–1982	Cruz Azul	140	(3)
1982–1983	Atlético Morelia	30	(0)

International career
1979–1980	Mexico	5	(0)
- * Club domestic league appearances and goals

Jorge López Malo (born 14 August 1957) is a Mexican former footballer. He competed in the men's tournament at the 1976 Summer Olympics.
