= Zé Carlos (footballer, born 1955) =

Brazilian footballer

Personal information
- Full name: José Carlos Pessanha
- Date of birth: 29 April 1955 (age 71)
- Place of birth: Campos dos Goytacazes, Brazil

International career
| Years | Team | Apps | (Gls) |
- Brazil Olympic

José Carlos Pessanha (born 29 April 1955), known as Zé Carlos, is a Brazilian footballer. He competed in the men's tournament at the 1976 Summer Olympics.
