= Michel Cougé =

French footballer (born 1954)

Personal information
- Date of birth: 11 June 1954 (age 72)
- Place of birth: Gorron, France
- Height: 6 ft 2 in (1.88 m)
- Position: Midfielder

Senior career*
Years	Team	Apps	(Gls)
1973–1975	Laval		
1975–1976	Rennes		
1976–1980	Laval		
- * Club domestic league appearances and goals

Michel Cougé (born 11 June 1954) is a French retired professional football midfielder.

In 1976, he was part of France's Olympic Football team.
