= José Luis Caballero =

Mexican footballer (1955–2021)

José Luis Caballero {not to be confused with Peruvian actor of the same name}
Personal information
- Date of birth: 21 June 1955
- Date of death: 14 January 2021 (aged 65)

International career
Years	Team	Apps	(Gls)
- Mexico
Medal record
Pan American Games
Gold medal – first place	1975 Mexico City	Team competition

José Luis Caballero (21 June 1955 – 14 January 2021) was a Mexican footballer. He competed in the men's tournament at the 1976 Summer Olympics and won a gold medal in football at the 1975 Pan American Games.
