= Víctor Rangel (Mexican footballer) =

Mexican footballer and manager (born 1957)

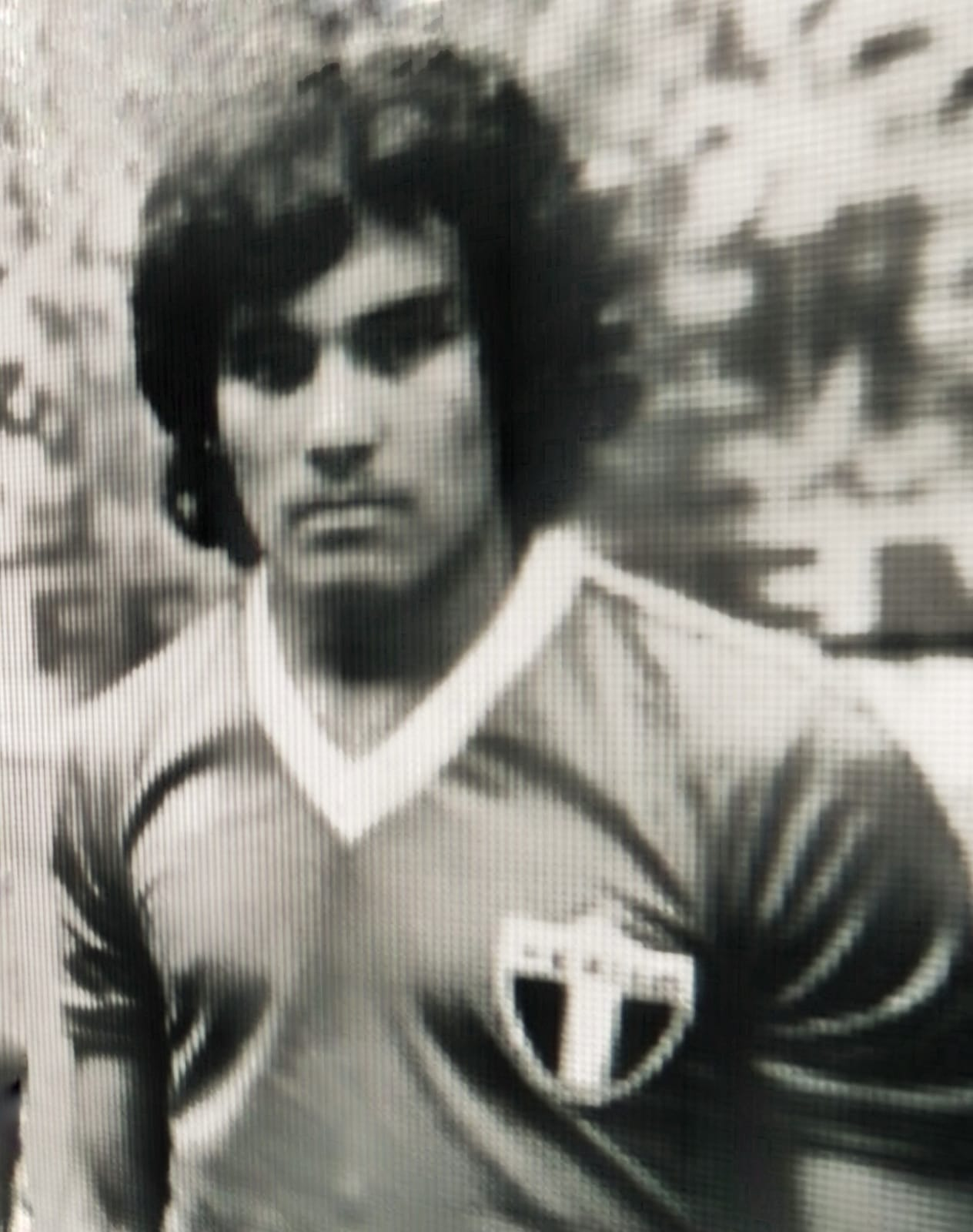
- Rangel with Mexico at the 1978 FIFA World Cup

Personal information
- Full name: Víctor Rangel Ayala
- Date of birth: 11 March 1957 (age 69)
- Place of birth: Mexico

Senior career*
Years	Team	Apps	(Gls)
1976–1982	C.D. Guadalajara	158	(44)
1982–1983	Club León	27	(7)
1983–1984	C.D. Guadalajara	20	(4)
1984–1986	Atlético Potosino	12	(2)
1986–1988	Ángeles de Puebla	57	(8)
Total		274	(65)

International career
1977–1980	Mexico	17	(7)
Medal record
Pan American Games
Gold medal – first place	1975 Mexico City	Team competition
- * Club domestic league appearances and goals

Víctor Rangel Ayala (born 11 March 1957) is a Mexican former footballer, currently manager of Atlético Mexiquense of the Mexican Primera Division A.

== Career ==
Born in Mexico City, Rangel played club football for Club Deportivo Guadalajara, Club León, Atlético Potosino and Ángeles de Puebla. He won a gold medal in football at the 1975 Pan American Games. He scored 3 goals at the 1976 Olympic Games and he scored 1 goal for the Mexico national football team in the 1978 FIFA World Cup. He played as a forward.

After he retired from playing, Rangel became a football manager. He led Club Tijuana until December 2007. He was appointed manager of Primera "A" club Atlético Mexiquense in June 2008.
