= Gerardo Lugo (footballer, born 1955) =

Mexican footballer (born 1955)

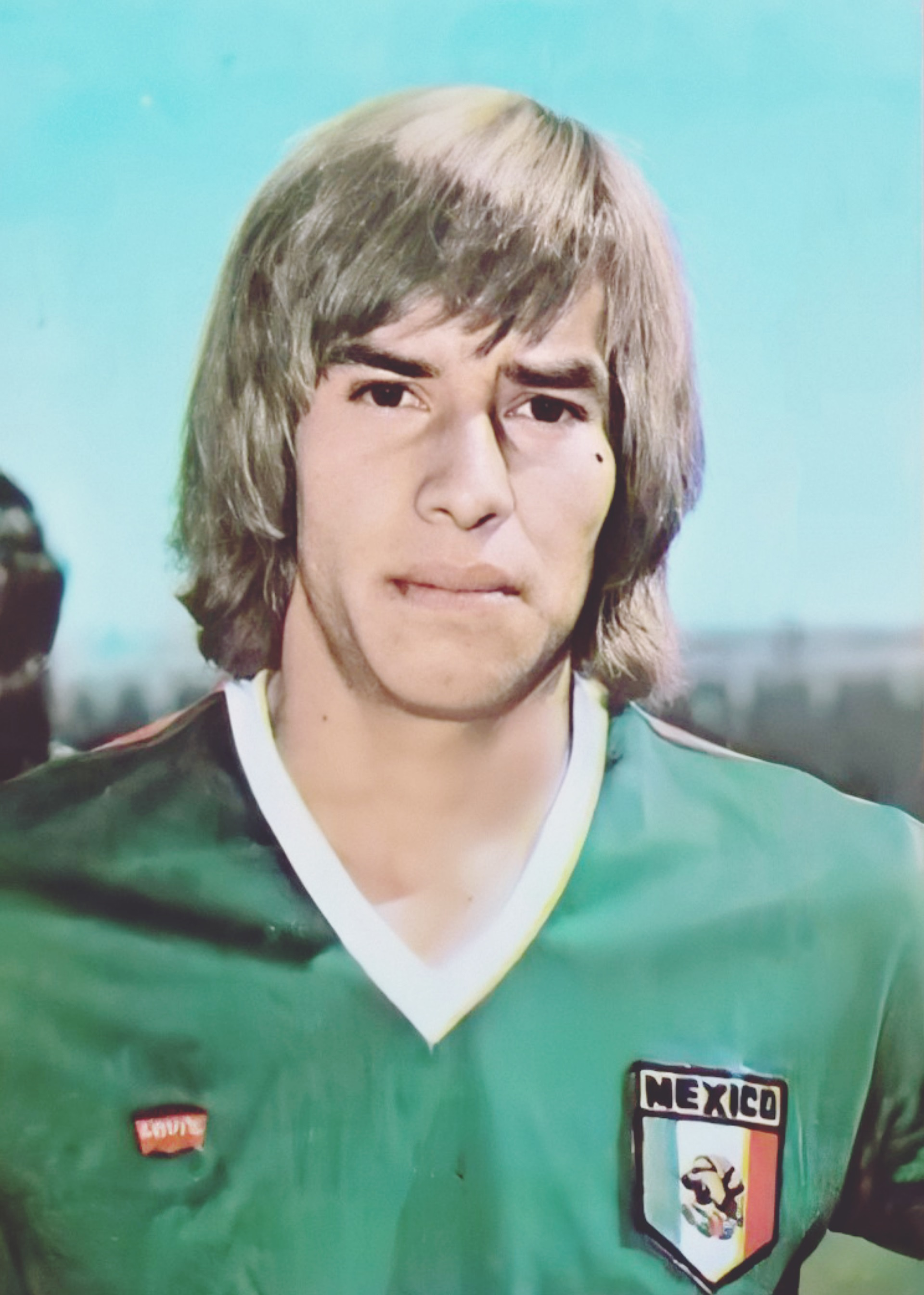
- Lugo with Mexico in 1978

Personal information
- Full name: Gerardo Lugo Gómez
- Date of birth: 13 March 1955 (age 71)
- Place of birth: Mexico City, Mexico
- Height: 1.69 m (5 ft 6 1/2 in)
- Position: Midfielder

Senior career*
| Years | Team | Apps | (Gls) |
| 1976–1978 | Atlante | | |
| 1978–1984 | Cruz Azul | | |
| 1984–1986 | León | | |
| 1986–1987 | Atlante | | |

International career
| 1978–1979 | Mexico | 8 | (2) |
- * Club domestic league appearances and goals

Gerardo Lugo Gómez (born 13 March 1955) is a Mexican former professional footballer who played as a midfielder for Mexico at the 1978 FIFA World Cup.

== Personal ==
Lugo's son, Édgar, is also a professional footballer who plays as a midfielder.
