= Julio Cepero =

Cuban footballer

Personal information
- Full name: Julio Cepero Balbín
- Date of birth: 27 September 1953 (age 73)
- Height: 1.60 m (5 ft 3 in)
- Position: Midfielder

Senior career*
Years	Team	Apps	(Gls)
- La Habana

International career
- Cuba
- * Club domestic league appearances and goals

Julio Cepero Balbín (born 27 September 1953) is a Cuban footballer. He competed in the men's tournament at the 1976 Summer Olympics.
