= Mauro Cabeção =

Brazilian footballer (1955–2004)

Personal information
- Full name: Mauro de Campos Júnior
- Date of birth: 23 April 1955
- Place of birth: Nova Odessa, Brazil
- Date of death: 6 August 2004 (aged 49)
- Height: 1.75 m (5 ft 9 in)
- Position: Defender

International career
Years	Team	Apps	(Gls)
- Brazil Olympic

Mauro de Campos Júnior (23 April 1955 – 6 August 2004), known as Mauro Cabeção, is a Brazilian former footballer who played as a defender. He competed in the men's tournament at the 1976 Summer Olympics.
