= Michel Pottier =

French footballer (born 1948)

Personal information
- Date of birth: 12 January 1948 (age 78)
- Position: Defender

International career
Years	Team	Apps	(Gls)
- France

Michel Pottier (born 12 January 1948) is a French former footballer. He competed in the men's tournament at the 1976 Summer Olympics.
