= Gabriel Márquez (footballer) =

Mexican footballer (born 1956)

Personal information
- Date of birth: 12 February 1956 (age 70)
- Place of birth: Pachuca

International career
Years	Team	Apps	(Gls)
1976	Mexico	3	(0)
Medal record
Pan American Games
Gold medal – first place	1975 Mexico City	Team competition

Gabriel Márquez (born 12 February 1956) is a Mexican former footballer. He competed in the men's tournament at the 1976 Summer Olympics and won a gold medal in football at the 1975 Pan American Games.
