= 1975 Campeonato Carioca =

Campeonato Carioca
- Season: 1975
- Champions: Fluminense
- Copa Brasil: Vasco da Gama; Flamengo; Fluminense; América; Botafogo
- Matches: 165
- Goals: 437 (2.65 per match)
- Top goalscorer: Zico (Flamengo) - 30 goals
- Biggest home win: Flamengo 5-0 Bangu (April 15, 1975); Vasco da Gama 6-1 São Cristóvão (April 16, 1975); Flamengo 5-0 Madureira (May 1, 1975); América 5-0 Portuguesa (May 24, 1975); Fluminense 5-0 Portuguesa (May 28, 1975); Botafogo 5-0 Bangu (July 9, 1975); Flamengo 5-0 Bangu (July 16, 1975)
- Biggest away win: Campo Grande 0-5 Botafogo (March 12, 1975); Olaria 0-5 Fluminense (March 21, 1975); Portuguesa 0-5 Flamengo (April 2, 1975); Bangu 0-5 Flamengo (June 11, 1975)
- Highest scoring: Botafogo 6-3 Campo Grande (May 1, 1975)

The 1975 edition of the Campeonato Carioca kicked off on February 20, 1975 and ended on August 17, 1975. It was organized by FCF (Federação Carioca de Futebol, or Carioca Football Federation). Twelve teams participated. Fluminense won the title for the 22nd time. no teams were relegated.

== System ==
The tournament would be divided in four stages:

- Taça Guanabara: The twelve teams all played in a single round-robin format against each other. The champions qualified to the Final phase.
- Taça Augusto Pereira da Motta: The twelve teams all played in a single round-robin format against each other. The champions qualified to the Final phase. The eight best teams qualified to the Third round.
- Taça Danilo Leal Carneiro: The remaining eight teams all played in a single round-robin format against each other. The champions qualified to the Final phase.
- Final phase: The three stage winners played in a single round-robin format against each other. the team with the most points won the title.

== Championship ==
=== Taça Guanabara ===
Pos	Team	Pld	W	D	L	GF	GA	GD	Pts	Qualification or relegation
1	Fluminense	11	8	2	1	26	7	+19	18	Playoffs
2	América	11	8	2	1	24	7	+17	18	Playoffs
3	Vasco da Gama	11	7	3	1	24	11	+13	17	
4	Botafogo	11	7	2	2	25	7	+18	16	
5	Flamengo	11	5	3	3	26	10	+16	13	
6	Bonsucesso	11	4	4	3	12	13	−1	12	
7	Bangu	11	4	3	4	9	12	−3	11	
8	São Cristóvão	11	2	3	6	13	27	−14	7	
9	Madureira	11	2	3	6	8	22	−14	7	
10	Portuguesa	11	0	5	6	6	18	−12	5	
11	Campo Grande	11	0	4	7	4	22	−18	4	
12	Olaria	11	0	4	7	5	26	−21	4	

Updated to match(es) played on April 21, 1975. Source: RSSSF.com
Rules for classification: 1) points; 2) goal difference; 3) wins; 4) number of goals scored.

==== Playoffs ====
Team 1	Score	Team 2
Fluminense	1–0	América

=== Taça Augusto Pereira da Motta ===
Pos	Team	Pld	W	D	L	GF	GA	GD	Pts	Qualification or relegation
1	Botafogo	11	10	1	0	31	8	+23	21	Qualified to Final phase
2	Flamengo	11	9	2	0	27	7	+20	20	
3	Vasco da Gama	11	7	1	3	18	6	+12	15	
4	Fluminense	11	6	3	2	19	8	+11	15	
5	América	11	6	2	3	19	14	+5	14	
6	Bangu	11	2	5	4	6	14	−8	9	
7	Madureira	11	3	2	6	7	18	−11	8	
8	Portuguesa	11	2	4	5	9	23	−14	8	
9	Olaria	11	1	4	6	6	12	−6	6	Eliminated
10	Campo Grande	11	2	2	7	6	16	−10	6	Eliminated
11	Bonsucesso	11	0	5	6	7	18	−11	5	Eliminated
12	São Cristóvão	11	0	5	6	6	17	−11	5	Eliminated

Updated to match(es) played on June 18, 1975. Source: RSSSF.com
Rules for classification: 1) points; 2) goal difference; 3) wins; 4) number of goals scored.

=== Taça Danilo Leal Carneiro ===
Pos	Team	Pld	W	D	L	GF	GA	GD	Pts	Qualification or relegation
1	Flamengo	7	6	0	1	22	6	+16	12	Playoffs
2	Vasco da Gama	7	6	0	1	19	7	+12	12	Playoffs
3	América	7	4	1	2	11	6	+5	9	
4	Fluminense	7	4	1	2	9	5	+4	9	
5	Botafogo	7	4	0	3	10	8	+2	8	
6	Madureira	7	2	0	5	8	19	−11	4	
7	Portuguesa	7	1	0	6	4	14	−10	2	
8	Bangu	7	0	0	7	1	19	−18	0	

Updated to match(es) played on August 3, 1975. Source: RSSSF.com
Rules for classification: 1) points; 2) goal difference; 3) wins; 4) number of goals scored.

==== Playoffs ====
Team 1	Score	Team 2
Vasco da Gama	1–0	Flamengo

=== Final phase ===
Pos	Team	Pld	W	D	L	GF	GA	GD	Pts	Qualification or relegation
1	Fluminense	2	1	0	1	4	2	+2	2	Champions
2	Botafogo	2	1	0	1	1	2	−1	2	
3	Vasco da Gama	2	1	0	1	3	4	−1	2	

Updated to match(es) played on August 17, 1975. Source: RSSSF.com
Rules for classification: 1) points; 2) goal difference; 3) wins; 4) number of goals scored.

== Top Scorer ==
Rank	Player	Club	Goals
1	Zico	Flamengo	30
2	Roberto Dinamite	Vasco da Gama	25
3	Nílson Dias	Botafogo	18
4	Manfrini	Fluminense	16
5	Flecha	América	14
5	Rodolfo Fischer	Botafogo	14
