= Football at the 1975 Pan American Games =

Football – Men's tournament at the Pan American Games
- Dates: 13–25 October

Medalists
Gold medal	Brazil; Mexico
Bronze medal	Argentina

The seventh edition of the football tournament at the Pan American Games was held in four cities in Mexico: Mexico City (main city of the Games), Guadalajara, Toluca, and Puebla, from 13 October to 25 October 1975. Thirteen teams competed in a round-robin competition, with Argentina defending the title. After the preliminary round there was a second round, followed by a knock-out stage.

== Participants ==
- Argentina (Amateur Team)
- Brazil (Olympic Team)
- Bolivia (Amateur Team)
- Canada (Olympic Team)
- Costa Rica
- Cuba
- El Salvador
- Jamaica
- Mexico (Olympic Team)
- Nicaragua
- Trinidad and Tobago
- Uruguay (Olympic Team)
- United States (Olympic Team)

== Preliminary round ==
=== Group A ===
Team	Pts	Pld	W	D	L	GF	GA	GD
Mexico	4	2	2	0	0	9	2	+7
Trinidad and Tobago	2	2	1	0	1	2	6	−4
United States	0	2	0	0	2	1	4	−3

13 October 1975

Mexico	6–1	Trinidad and Tobago
Rangel 5', 17', 26', 68'; Caballero 25', 65'		Grayson 58'

Estadio La Bombonera, Toluca
Attendance: 26,000
Referee: Arturo Ithurralde (Argentina)

15 October 1975

Mexico	3–1	United States
Carrillo 20'; Tapia 31'; Goméz 40'		Salvemini 75'

Estadio La Bombonera, Toluca
Attendance: 30,000
Referee: Oscar Scolfaro (Brazil)

17 October 1975

Trinidad and Tobago	1–0	United States
Llewellyn 23'

Estadio La Bombonera, Toluca

=== Group B ===
Team	Pts	Pld	W	D	L	GF	GA	GD
Argentina	4	2	2	0	0	8	0	+8
Canada	1	2	0	1	1	0	2	−2
Jamaica	1	2	0	1	1	0	6	−6

13 October 1975

Canada	0–0	Jamaica

Estadio Cuauhtémoc, Puebla
Referee: Carlos Alfaro (Costa Rica)

15 October 1975

Argentina	6–0	Jamaica
Silva 22', 34', 69'; Salinas 47'; Cárdenas 52'; Marillack 54'

Estadio Cuauhtémoc, Puebla
Attendance: 20,000
Referee: Jorge Narváez (Mexico)

17 October 1975

Argentina	2–0	Canada
Cárdenas 12'; Grant 69' (o.g.)

Estadio Cuauhtémoc, Puebla
Referee: Valentin Gazo (Nicaragua)

=== Group C ===
Team	Pts	Pld	W	D	L	GF	GA	GD
Cuba	3	2	1	1	0	4	1	+3
Bolivia	2	2	1	0	1	1	3	−2
Uruguay	1	2	0	1	1	1	2	−1

13 October 1975

Cuba	1–1	Uruguay
Cepero 40'		Pierre

Estadio Azteca, Mexico City

15 October 1975

Cuba	3–0	Bolivia
Piedra 5'; Masso 9'; Pérez 89'

Estadio Azteca, Mexico City
Referee: Efrén Aguilar (El Salvador)

17 October 1975

Bolivia	1–0	Uruguay
Blanco 41'

Estadio Azteca, Mexico City

=== Group D ===
Team	Pts	Pld	W	D	L	GF	GA	GD
Brazil	6	3	3	0	0	19	1	+18
Costa Rica	3	3	1	1	1	6	4	+2
El Salvador	3	3	1	1	1	4	3	+1
Nicaragua	0	3	0	0	3	2	23	−21

14 October 1975

El Salvador	4–1	Nicaragua
Huezo 61', 66', 89'; Ramírez 87'		Cuadra 71'

Estadio Azteca, Mexico City
Referee: Luis Barrancos (Bolivia)

14 October 1975

Brazil	3–1	Costa Rica
Vázquez 23' (o.g.); Tiquinho 54'; Cláudio Adão 70'		Wanchope 85'

Estadio Azteca, Mexico City
Referee: Enrique Mendoza (Mexico)

15 October 1975

Costa Rica	5–1	Nicaragua
Solano 18'; Alvarado 26', 35'; Wanchope 68', 76'		Acevedo 31'

Estadio Azteca, Mexico City

15 October 1975

Brazil	2–0	El Salvador
Cláudio Adão 14'; Edinho 69'

Estadio Azteca, Mexico City
Referee: Domingo de la Mora (Mexico)

17 October 1975

Costa Rica	0–0	El Salvador

Estadio Azteca, Mexico City

17 October 1975

Brazil	14–0	Nicaragua
Luís Alberto 1', 3', 16', 32'; Santos 5', 34'; Rosemiro 21'; Eudes 24'; Erivélto 30'; Chico Fraga 59'; Batista 67', 74'; Marcelo 72', ?'

Estadio Azteca, Mexico City
Referee: Ramón Calderón (Cuba)

== Second round ==
=== Group A ===
Team	Pts	Pld	W	D	L	GF	GA	GD
Mexico	5	3	2	1	0	17	2	+15
Costa Rica	2	2	1	0	1	1	7	−6
Cuba	1	2	0	1	1	2	3	−1
Canada	0	1	0	0	1	0	8	−8

19 October 1975

Mexico	8–0	Canada
Rangel 2', 31'; Sánchez 12', 48', ?'; Caballero 36', ?'; Gómez 70'

Estadio La Bombonera, Toluca
Attendance: 30,000
Referee: Oscar Scolfaro (Brazil)

19 October 1975

Costa Rica	1–0	Cuba
Piedra

Estadio La Bombonera, Toluca

21 October 1975

Costa Rica	w/o	Canada

Canada did not play the match and withdrew from the tournament. Match awarded to Costa Rica.

21 October 1975

Mexico	2–2	Cuba
Caballero 7'; Sánchez 55' (pen.)		Delgado 22' de la Rosa 75' (o.g.)

Estadio La Bombonera, Toluca

23 October 1975

Cuba	w/o	Canada

Canada had withdrawn from the tournament. Match awarded to Cuba.

23 October 1975

Mexico	7–0	Costa Rica
Sánchez 9', 22', 33'; Caballero 38'; Rangel 58', 76', 83'

Estadio La Bombonera, Toluca
Referee: Toros Kibritjian (United States)

=== Group B ===
Team	Pts	Pld	W	D	L	GF	GA	GD
Brazil	5	3	2	1	0	13	0	+13
Argentina	5	3	2	1	0	9	1	+8
Bolivia	2	3	1	0	2	3	11	−8
Trinidad and Tobago	0	3	0	0	3	2	15	−13

19 October 1975

Argentina	5–1	Trinidad and Tobago
Ceballos 38' (pen.); Salinas 50', 55'; Valencia 61', 64'		Phillips 63'

Estadio Azteca, Mexico City
Referee: Carlos Alfaro (Costa Rica)

19 October 1975

Brazil	6–0	Bolivia
Leguelé 16' (pen.); Cláudio Adão 37', 46', 89', ?'; Erivélto

Estadio Azteca, Mexico City
Referee: Dante Maglio (Canada)

21 October 1975

Brazil	0–0	Argentina

Estadio Azteca, Mexico City
Referee: Alfonso González (Mexico)

21 October 1975

Bolivia	3–1	Trinidad and Tobago
Blanco 6'; Sempertegui 32'; Flores 43'		Laforest

Estadio Azteca, Mexico City
Referee: Jorge Narváez (Mexico)

23 October 1975

Argentina	4–0	Bolivia
Fortunato 2', ?'; Silva; Ceballos (pen.)

Estadio Azteca, Mexico City
Referee: Alfonso González (Mexico)

23 October 1975

Brazil	6–0	Trinidad and Tobago
Cláudio Adão 4', 40', 62'; Erivélto 15'; Santos 16'; Eudes 18'

Estadio Azteca, Mexico City
Referee: Ilio Matos (Canada)

== Classification stages ==
=== Bronze medal match ===
25 October 1975

Argentina	2–0	Costa Rica
Silva 36'; Tello 70'	Report

Estadio Azteca, Mexico City
Referee: Oscar Scolfaro (Brazil)

=== Gold medal match ===
25 October 1975 (Note: The match was abandoned at 108' due to a power failure. A replay was originally fixed for 29 October, but due to the Brazilian team having to return home following the closing ceremony, tournament officials ruled that the final result would stand, with gold medals being awarded to both teams.)

Mexico	1–1 (a.e.t.)	Brazil
Tapia 22'	Report	Cláudio Adão 85' (pen.)

Estadio Azteca, Mexico City
Attendance: 105,000
Referee: Arturo Iturralde (Argentina)

Notes

Team details

Mexico
Brazil

GK	José Gómez;
DF	Gabriel Márquez
DF	Bardomiano Viveros	Substituted off
DF	Carlos García
DF	Mario Carrillo
MF	Francisco Bugarín
MF	José Luis Caballero
MF	Guillermo Cosio
FW	Héctor Tapia
FW	Víctor Rangel
FW	Hugo Sánchez
Substitutes:
	Víctor Gómez	(substituted on) a'
Manager:
(Mexico) Diego Mercado

GK	Carlos
DF	Mauro Cabeção
DF	Tecão
DF	Edinho
DF	Chico Fraga
MF	Batista	(substituted off) a'
MF	Eudes
MF	Rosemiro
FW	Luiz Alberto	(substituted off) b'
FW	Cláudio Adão
FW	Santos
Substitutes:
DF	Bianchi	(substituted on) a'
MF	Marcelo Oliveira	(substituted on) b'
Manager:
(Brazil) Zizinho

1975 Pan American Games Winners
Mexico and Brazil
Second title (for both)

== Medalists ==
Event	Gold	Silver	Bronze
Men's tournament	Brazil and Mexico 1 – Carlos; 2 – Rosemiro; 3 – Tecão; 4 – Bianchi; 5 – Chico Fraga; 6 – Batista; 7 – Pitta; 8 – Carlinhos; 9 – Marcelo Oliveira; 10 – Cláudio Adão; 11 – Tiquinho; 12 – Cassano; 13 – Mauro Cabeção; 14 – Edinho; 15 – Alberto Leguelé; 16 – Luiz Alberto; 17 – Eudes; 18 – Erivelto; 19 – Santos; 20 – Zé Carlos (HC – Zizinho) 1 – Julio Gómez; 2 – Gabriel Márquez; 3 – Eduardo Rergis; 4 – Bardomiano Viveros; 5 – Mario Carrillo; 6 – Ernesto de la Rosa; 7 – José Luis Caballero; 8 – Guillermo Cosio; 9 – Héctor Tapia; 10 – Víctor Rangel; 11 – Hugo Sánchez; 12 – Javier Regalado; 13 – Carlos García Cuevas; 14 – Jorge López Malo; 15 – Francisco Bugarín; 16 – Alberto Sandoval; 17 – Alfredo Navarrete; 18 – Víctor Gómez; 19 – Rafael Toribio; 20 – Oscar Mascorro (HC – Diego Mercado)	(None)	Argentina 1 – Carlos Suárez; 2 – Daniel Valencia; 3 – Aldo Espinoza; 4 – Manuel Pereyra; 5 – Luis Galván; 6 – Pablo Cárdenas; 7 – Ricardo Alonso; 8 – Eduardo Marillack; 9 – Santiago Tello; 10 – Américo Gallego; 11 – Pedro Agustín Fernández; 12 – Alberto Vivaldo; 13 – Pedro Evaristo Farías; 14 – Carlos Salinas; 15 – Jorge Salas; 16 – Sergio Fortunato; 17 – Juan Silva; 18 – José Luis Ceballos (HC – César Luis Menotti)

== Goalscorers ==
There were 107 goals scored in 27 matches, for an average of 3.96 goals per match.

10 goals

- (Brazil) Cláudio Adão

9 goals

- (Mexico) Víctor Rangel

7 goals

- (Mexico) Hugo Sánchez

6 goals

- (Mexico) José Luis Caballero

5 goals

- (Argentina) Juan Silva

4 goals

- (Brazil) Luiz Alberto
- (Brazil) Santos

3 goals

- (Brazil) Erivelto
- (Costa Rica) Vicente Wanchope
- (El Salvador) Norberto Huezo

2 goals

- (Argentina) Pablo Cárdenas
- (Argentina) José Luis Ceballos
- (Argentina) Sergio Fortunato
- (Argentina) Carlos Salinas
- (Argentina) Daniel Valencia
- (Bolivia) Manuel Blanco
- (Brazil) Batista
- (Brazil) Eudes
- (Brazil) Marcelo Oliveira
- (Costa Rica) Johnny Alvarado
- (Mexico) Víctor Gómez
- (Mexico) Héctor Tapia

1 goal

- (Argentina) Américo Gallego
- (Argentina) Eduardo Marillack
- (Argentina) Santiago Tello
- (Bolivia) Natalio Flores
- (Bolivia) Luis Sempertegui
- (Brazil) Edinho
- (Brazil) Chico Fraga
- (Brazil) Alberto Leguelé
- (Brazil) Rosemiro
- (Brazil) Tiquinho
- (Costa Rica) Alfredo Piedra
- (Costa Rica) Carlos Solano
- (Cuba) Julio Cepero
- (Cuba) Regino Delgado
- (Cuba) Jorge Massó
- (Cuba) Orestes Pérez
- (Cuba) Francisco Piedra
- (El Salvador) Luis Ramírez Zapata
- (Mexico) Mario Carrillo
- (Nicaragua) Rodolfo Acevedo
- (Nicaragua) Manuel Cuadra
- (Trinidad and Tobago) Michael Grayson
- (Trinidad and Tobago) Ron Laforest
- (Trinidad and Tobago) Noel Llewellyn
- (Trinidad and Tobago) Winston Phillips
- (United States) Leonard Salvemini
- (Uruguay) Eduardo Pierri

1 own goal

- (Canada) Kevin Grant (against Argentina)
- (Costa Rica) Jorge Vázquez (against Brazil)
- (Mexico) Ernesto de la Rosa (against Cuba)

Source: RSSSF
