= Brazil at the 1979 Pan American Games =

- IOC code: BRA
- NOC: Brazilian Olympic Committee
- Website: www.cob.org.br

in San Juan 1–15 July 1979
- Competitors: 278 in 22 sports
- Flag bearer: Arthur Ribeiro
- Medals Ranked 5th: Gold 9 Silver 13 Bronze 17 Total 39

Pan American Games appearances (overview)
- 1951; 1955; 1959; 1963; 1967; 1971; 1975; 1979; 1983; 1987; 1991; 1995; 1999; 2003; 2007; 2011; 2015; 2019; 2023; 2027

Brazil competed at the 8th Pan American Games that were held in San Juan, Puerto Rico from July 1 to July 15, 1979.

== Medals ==
| Medal | Name(s) | Sport | Event | Date | Ref |
|---|---|---|---|---|---|
| Bronze | Arci Zélia Kempner; Cláudia Vasques; Daisy Schmidt | Archery | Women's team | | |
| Silver | Antônio Ferreira | Athletics | Men's 400m hurdles | | |
| Bronze | Agberto Guimarães | Athletics | Men's 800m | 9 July 1979 | |
| Bronze | Agberto Guimarães | Athletics | Men's 1500m | | |
| Bronze | Altevir de Araújo; Milton de Castro; Nelson dos Santos; Rui da Silva | Athletics | Men's 4 × 100 m relay | | |
| Gold | João Carlos de Oliveira | Athletics | Men's long jump | 7 July 1979 | |
| Gold | João Carlos de Oliveira | Athletics | Men's triple jump | 9 July 1979 | |
| Bronze | Men's basketball team: Adilson Nascimento Fausto Gianecchini Evaristo Soares José Carlos Saiani José Geraldo Hélio Rubens Marcel de Souza Marcelo Vido Marcos Leite Milton Setrini Oscar Schmidt Ubiratan Pereira Maciel | Basketball | Men's tournament | | |
| Bronze | Francisco de Jesus | Boxing | Men's light middleweight (-71 kg) | | |
| Silver | Carlos Antunes da Fonseca | Boxing | Men's middleweight (-75 kg) | | |
| Gold | Men's football team: Solitinho Cléo Cristóvão Mica Edson Boaro Gilcimar Jackson Jérson João Luiz Silva Luís Cláudio Luís Henrique Oswaldo Rogério Silvinho Valdoir Vítor Wagner Basílio | Football | Men's tournament | 14 July 1979 | |
| Bronze | Gilmarcio Antunes Sanches; Hélio Araújo; João Francisco Levy; João Luiz Ribeiro; Luiz Tadeu Braga; Reinaldo Calinsque | Gymnastics | Men's all-around team | | |
| Gold | Luis Shinohara | Judo | Men's extra lightweight (-60 kg) | | |
| Silver | Luís Onmura | Judo | Men's half lightweight (-65 kg) | | |
| Bronze | Roberto Machusso | Judo | Men's lightweight (-71 kg) | | |
| Gold | Carlos Alberto Cunha | Judo | Men's half middleweight (-78 kg) | | |
| Gold | Carlos Pacheco | Judo | Men's half heavyweight (-95 kg) | | |
| Bronze | Oswaldo Simões Filho | Judo | Men's heavyweight (+95 kg) | | |
| Gold | Oswaldo Simões Filho | Judo | Men's open class | | |
| Silver | Men's roller hockey team: Antônio Requena José Ricardo Frei Haroldo Requena Mário Alcoforado Maurício Duque Moacir Neuenschwander Paulo Peres Silvio Angerami | Roller sports | Roller hockey | | |
| Silver | Gilberto Gerhardt; José Cláudio Lazzarotto; Paulo Dworakowski; Waldemar Trombetta | Rowing | Men's quadruple sculls | | |
| Gold | Laildo Machado; Manuel Tereso Novo; Wandir Kuntze | Rowing | Men's coxed pair-oared shells | | |
| Bronze | Edson Menezes; Henrique Johann; Oscar Sommer; Raúl Bagattini | Rowing | Men's coxless four-oared shells | | |
| Bronze | Boris Osterbren; Ernestro Neugebauer | Sailing | Snipe class | | |
| Gold | Joaquim Feneberg; Mario Buckup; Ralph Christian | Sailing | Lightning class | | |
| Silver | Eduardo Souza Ramos; Manfredo Kaufmann Jr. Thomas Heimann | Sailing | Soling class | | |
| Silver | Bertino Alves de Souza; Paulo Lamego; Sylvio Carvalho; Wilson Scheidemantel | Shooting | Men's 50m pistol team | | |
| Bronze | Dilson Reis; Durval Guimarães; Milton Sobocinski; Waldemar Capucci | Shooting | Men's 50m rifle prone team | | |
| Silver | Flávio Bonet; Francisco Alavaugarte; Marcos José Olsen; Paulo Monteiro Assis | Shooting | Men's trap team | | |
| Silver | Rômulo Arantes | Swimming | Men's 100m backstroke | 2 July 1979 | |
| Bronze | Djan Madruga | Swimming | Men's 200m backstroke | 5 July 1979 | |
| Bronze | Djan Madruga | Swimming | Men's 200m freestyle | 2 July 1979 | |
| Silver | Djan Madruga | Swimming | Men's 400m freestyle | 5 July 1979 | |
| Silver | Djan Madruga | Swimming | Men's 1500m freestyle | 7 July 1979 | |
| Bronze | Cyro Delgado; Djan Madruga; Marcus Mattioli; Rômulo Arantes | Swimming | Men's 4 × 100 m freestyle relay | 3 July 1979 | |
| Silver | Cyro Delgado; Djan Madruga; Jorge Fernandes; Marcus Mattioli | Swimming | Men's 4 × 200 m freestyle relay | 6 July 1979 | |
| Silver | Men's volleyball team: Aloisio Alves Antônio Carlos Moreno Antônio Carlos Ribeiro Bernard Rajzman Deraldo Wanderley Helder Zech João Alves Grangeiro Neto José Montanaro Jr. Mario Xandó Netto Mauro Henrique Fialho Renan Dal Zotto William Silva | Volleyball | Men's tournament | | |
| Bronze | Women's volleyball team: Célia Garritano Denise Porto Eliana Aleixo Fernanda Emerick Heloísa Roese Ivonete das Neves Jackie Silva Lenice Oliveira Dora Castanheira Isabel Salgado Mônica da Silva Rita Teixeira | Volleyball | Women's tournament | | |
| Bronze | Nelson Dias de Carvalho | Weightlifting | Men's middle heavyweight (-90 kg) | | |

Medals by sport
| Sport | 1st place, gold medalist(s) | 2nd place, silver medalist(s) | 3rd place, bronze medalist(s) | Total |
| Judo | 4 | 1 | 2 | 7 |
| Shooting | 1 | 2 | 1 | 4 |
| Athletics | 1 | 1 | 3 | 5 |
| Rowing | 1 | 1 | 1 | 3 |
| Sailing | 1 | 1 | 1 | 3 |
| Football | 1 | 0 | 0 | 1 |
| Swimming | 0 | 4 | 3 | 7 |
| Boxing | 0 | 1 | 1 | 2 |
| Volleyball | 0 | 1 | 1 | 2 |
| Roller sports | 0 | 1 | 0 | 1 |
| Archery | 0 | 0 | 1 | 1 |
| Basketball | 0 | 0 | 1 | 1 |
| Gymnastics | 0 | 0 | 1 | 1 |
| Weightlifting | 0 | 0 | 1 | 1 |
| Total | 9 | 13 | 17 | 39 |

== See also ==
- Brazil at the 1980 Summer Olympics
