= Brazil at the 1980 Summer Olympics =

- IOC code: BRA
- NOC: Brazilian Olympic Committee

in Moscow
- Competitors: 106 (91 men and 15 women) in 14 sports
- Flag bearer: João Carlos de Oliveira
- Medals Ranked 17th: Gold 2 Silver 0 Bronze 2 Total 4

Summer Olympics appearances (overview)
- 1920; 1924; 1928; 1932; 1936; 1948; 1952; 1956; 1960; 1964; 1968; 1972; 1976; 1980; 1984; 1988; 1992; 1996; 2000; 2004; 2008; 2012; 2016; 2020; 2024; 2028

Brazil competed at the 1980 Summer Olympics in Moscow, USSR. 106 competitors, 91 men and 15 women, took part in 72 events in 14 sports. Brazilian athletes won two gold medals after a drought of 24 years, since the 1956 Summer Olympics, as well as two bronze medals.

Both the two gold medals were obtained in sailing and they were the first gold medals in the history of the sport. Lars Sigurd Bjorkström and Alexandre Welter were Olympic champions in Tornado class. Marcos Soares and Eduardo Penido won the gold medal in the 470 class.

Brazil won a medal in a relay event in swimming for the first time - the bronze in men's 4 × 200 metre freestyle relay.

The current world record holder and bronze medalist triple jumper João Carlos de Oliveira repeated the result in men's triple jump in a very controversial event. The Soviet Union's Jaak Uudmäe and Viktor Saneyev placed first and second, ahead of Oliveira. Both him and fourth place Australia's Ian Campbell produced long jumps, but they were declared fouls by the officials and not measured.

== Medalists ==
Medal	Name	Sport	Event	Date
Gold	Lars Sigurd Bjorkström; Alexandre Welter	Sailing	Tornado class	July 29
Gold	Marcos Soares; Eduardo Penido	Sailing	470 class	July 29
Bronze	Cyro Delgado; Jorge Fernandes; Djan Madruga; Marcus Mattioli	Swimming	Men's 4 × 200 metre freestyle relay	July 23
Bronze	João Carlos de Oliveira	Athletics	Men's triple jump	July 24

Medals by sport
Sport	1st place, gold medalist(s)	2nd place, silver medalist(s)	3rd place, bronze medalist(s)	Total
Sailing	2	0	0	2
Athletics	0	0	1	1
Swimming	0	0	1	1
Total	2	0	2	4

Medals by gender
Gender	1st place, gold medalist(s)	2nd place, silver medalist(s)	3rd place, bronze medalist(s)	Total
Male	2	0	2	4
Female	0	0	0	0
Mixed	0	0	0	0
Total	2	0	2	4

== Archery ==
In its first Olympic archery competition, Brazil sent one woman and one man.

Men

Athlete	Event	Round 1		Round 2		Total score	
Athlete	Event	Score	Seed	Score	Seed	Score	Seed
Renato Emilio	Individual	1139	28	1125	27	2264	27

Women

Athlete	Event	Round 1		Round 2		Total score	
Athlete	Event	Score	Seed	Score	Seed	Score	Seed
Arci Kempner	Individual	1084	25	1102	24	2186	26

== Athletics ==
Men
Track & road events

Athlete	Event	Heat		Quarterfinal		Semifinal		Final	
Athlete	Event	Result	Rank	Result	Rank	Result	Rank	Result	Rank
Altevir de Araújo	200 m	21.49	4 q	21.22	7	Did not advance			
Milton de Castro	100 m	10.74	5	Did not advance					
Paulo Roberto Correia	200 m	21.27	3 Q	21.01	6	Did not advance			
Antônio Dias Ferreira	400 m hurdles	50.14	2 Q	—N/a		52.31	7	Did not advance	
Agberto Guimarães	800 m	1:48.2	3 Q	—N/a		1:46.9	3 Q	1:46.2	4
Katsuhiko Nakaya	100 m	10.72	3 Q	10.70	8	Did not advance			
Geraldo José Pegado	400 m	48.71	6	Did not advance					
Nelson dos Santos	100 m	10.51	3 Q	10.45	7	Did not advance			
Milton de Castro; Nelson dos Santos; Katsuhiko Nakaya; Altevir de Araújo	4 × 100 m	39.48	4 q	—N/a				39.54	8
Paulo Roberto Correia; Antônio Dias Ferreira; Agberto Guimarães; Geraldo José Pegado	4 × 400 m	3:04.9	2 Q	—N/a				3:05.9	5

Field events

Athlete	Event	Qualification		Final	
Athlete	Event	Distance	Position	Distance	Position
Claudio da Matta Freire	High jump	2.05	29	Did not advance	
João Carlos de Oliveira	Long jump	7.78	12 q	DNS	
João Carlos de Oliveira	Triple jump	16.62	5 Q	17.22	Bronze

Women
Combined events – Pentathlon

Athlete	Event	100H	SP	HJ	LJ	800 m	Final	Rank
Conceição Geremias	Result	14.33	13.16	1.71	5.97	2:18.90	4263	14
Conceição Geremias	Points	825	789	945	900	804	4263	14

== Basketball ==
=== Preliminary round ===
The top two teams from each group advance to the final round group, while the remaining teams compete for 8th through 12th places in the classification group. Hosts Soviet Union and the world champions Yugoslavia advanced undefeated to the final round. Meanwhile, qualification in Group C was closely contested between Italy, Cuba and Australia, which ended up being decided by a third tiebreaker in favor of the first two teams.

==== Group A ====
Qualified for the quarterfinals

Team	W	L	PF	PA	PD	Pts
Soviet Union	3	0	321	235	+86	6
Brazil	2	1	297	235	+62	5
Czechoslovakia	1	2	285	236	+49	4
India	0	3	194	391	−197	3

July 20

Brazil	72–70	Czechoslovakia

Olympiiski, Moscow

July 21

Brazil	88–101	Soviet Union

Olympiiski, Moscow

July 23

Brazil	137–64	India

Olympiiski, Moscow

=== Final round ===
The first two places in the preliminary group compete for the gold medal, while the third and fourth places compete for the bronze. The remaining teams' group ranking determines their positions in the final standings. The host nation failed to compete for the gold in spite of finishing the preliminary round undefeated, due to losses against the other two group leaders Yugoslavia and especially Italy, since the result from that match served as tiebreaker, giving the latter a passport to the gold medal match. The Soviet Union then won the bronze against Spain. Yugoslavia earned their first and only gold medal in men's basketball at this Olympic Games. Results from Yugoslavia vs. Spain, Italy vs. Cuba and Soviet Union vs. Brazil were carried over from the preliminary round.

Competed for the gold medal
Competed for the bronze medal

Team	W	L	PF	PA	PD	Pts	1st Tie
Yugoslavia	5	0	506	442	+64	10	
Italy	3	2	419	438	−19	8	1W–0L
Soviet Union	3	2	505	468	+37	8	0W–1L
Spain	2	3	488	485	+3	7	1W–0L
Brazil	2	3	448	477	−29	7	0W–1L
Cuba	0	5	434	490	−56	5	

July 25

Brazil	94–93	Cuba

Olympiiski, Moscow

July 26

Spain	110–81	Brazil

Olympiiski, Moscow

July 27

Italy	77–90	Brazil

Olympiiski, Moscow

July 29

Brazil	95–96	Yugoslavia

Olympiiski, Moscow

- Team Roster:
  - André Ernesto Stoffel
  - Luiz Gustavo de Lage
  - José Carlos Santos Saiani
  - Milton Setrini
  - Wagner Machado da Silva
  - Marcos Abdalla Leite
  - Gilson Trindade de Jesus
  - Marcel Ramon de Souza
  - Adilson de Nascimento
  - Marcelo Vido
  - Oscar Schmidt
  - Ricardo Cardoso Guimarães

== Boxing ==
Men

Athlete	Event	1 Round	2 Round	3 Round	Quarterfinals	Semifinals	Final	
Athlete	Event	Opposition Result	Opposition Result	Opposition Result	Opposition Result	Opposition Result	Opposition Result	Rank
Sidnei dal Rovere	Featherweight	BYE	Narendra Poma (NEP); W KO-1	Leoul Neeraio (ETH); W 5-0	Krzysztof Kosedowski (POL); L 0-5	Did not advance		5
Jaime Franco	Light welterweight	Anthony Willis (GBR); L 0-5	Did not advance					
Francisco de Jesus	Light middleweight	Mbemba Camara (GUI); W 5-0	Leo Vainonen (FIN); W 5-0	Armando Martínez (CUB); L 0-5	Did not advance			
Carlos Fonseca	Middleweight	BYE	Mark Kaylor (GBR); L 1-4	Did not advance				

== Cycling ==
Six cyclists represented Brazil in 1980.

=== Road ===
Athlete	Event	Time	Rank
Gilson Alvaristo	Road race	DNF	
José Carlos de Lima	Road race	DNF	
Fernando Louro	Road race	DNF	
Davis Pereira	Road race	DNF	

=== Track ===
1000m time trial

Athlete	Event	Time	Rank
Hans Fischer	1000m time trial	1:10.801	15

Pursuit

Athlete	Event	Qualification		Quarterfinals	Semifinals	Final	
Athlete	Event	Time	Rank	Opposition Time	Opposition Time	Opposition Time	Rank
Antônio Silvestre	Men's individual pursuit	4:54,52	13	Did not advance			
Hans Fischer; José Carlos de Lima; Fernando Louro; Antônio Silvestre	Team pursuit	4:32,34	11	Did not advance			

== Diving ==
Men

Athlete	Event	Preliminary		Final				
Athlete	Event	Points	Rank	Points	Rank	½ Prel.	Total	Rank
Milton Jorge Braga	3 m springboard	451.17	22	Did not advance				
Milton Jorge Braga	10 m platform	373.06	20	Did not advance				

== Gymnastics ==
=== Artistic ===
Men

Athlete	Event	Qualification								Final							
Athlete	Event	Apparatus						Total	Rank	Apparatus						Total	Rank
Athlete	Event	F	PH	R	V	PB	HB	Total	Rank	F	PH	R	V	PB	HB	Total	Rank
João Luiz Ribeiro	All-around	18.20	16.85	17.35	18.65	17.05	17.65	52.30	64	Did not advance							

Women

Athlete	Event	Qualification						Final					
Athlete	Event	Apparatus				Total	Rank	Apparatus				Total	Rank
Athlete	Event	F	V	UB	BB	Total	Rank	F	V	UB	BB	Total	Rank
Claudia Costa	All-around	17.50	18.20	17.60	17.25	35.275	Q	8.650	8.800	8.200	8.850	69.775	31

== Judo ==
Men

Athlete	Event	Round 1	Round 2	Round 3	Round 4	Repechage 1	Repechage 2	Final / BM	
Athlete	Event	Opposition Result	Opposition Result	Opposition Result	Opposition Result	Opposition Result	Opposition Result	Opposition Result	Rank
Luiz Juniti Shinohara	−60 kg	Boubacar Sow (SEN); W 1000-0000	Tibor Kincses (HUN); L 0000-0001	Did not advance					13
Luiz Onmura	−65 kg	Constantin Niculae (ROU); W 1000-0000	Wolfgang Biedron (SWE); L 0000-0001	Did not advance					13
Anelson Vieira	−71 kg	Edward Alkśnin (POL); L 0000-1000	Did not advance						19
Carlos Alberto Cunha	−78 kg	Michel Grant (SWE); W 1000-0000	Thomas Hagmann (SUI); W 1000-0000	Mircea Frăţică (ROU); L 0000-0001	Did not advance				10
Walter Carmona	−86 kg	Endre Kiss (HUN); W 1000-0000	Akilong Diabone (SEN); W 1000-0000	Mihalache Toma (ROU); W 1000-0000	Isaac Azcuy (CUB); L 0000-0001	Did not advance		Detlef Ultsch (GDR); L 0000-0001	5
Walter Carmona	Open	Jaakko Saari (FIN); W 1000-0000	Dimitar Zapryanov (BUL); L 0000-0001	Did not advance					10
Luiz Moura	−95 kg	Tsancho Atanasov (BUL); W 1000-0000	Jean-Luc Rougé (FRA); L 0000-0001	Did not advance					13
Oswaldo Simões Filho	+95 kg	BYE	Kim Myong Gyu (PRK); L 0000-0001	Did not advance					10

== Rowing ==
Men

Athlete	Event	Heats		Repechage		Semifinals		Final	
Athlete	Event	Time	Rank	Time	Rank	Time	Rank	Time	Rank
Paulo Cesar Dvorawski	Single sculls	8:01.38	3 SF	BYE		7:39.28	6 FB	7:32.00	12
José Cláudio Lazzarotto; Ronaldo de Carvalho; Ricardo de Carvalho; Waldemar Trombetta	Quadruple sculls	6:25.84	5 R	6:11.96	4 FB	—N/a		6:06.58	11
Laildo Machado; Wandir Kuntze; Walter Soares; Henrique Johann; Manuel Mandel	Coxless pair	6:59.98	5 R	6:37.07	3 FB	—N/a		6:33.29	8

== Sailing ==
Open

Athlete	Event	Race														Final rank	
Athlete	Event	1		2		3		4		5		6		7		Final rank	
Athlete	Event	Score	Rank	Score	Rank	Score	Rank	Score	Rank	Score	Rank	Score	Rank	Score	Rank	Score	Rank
Claudio Biekarck	Finn	9	15.0	5	10.0	1	0.0	~~13~~	~~19.0~~	9	15.0	5	10.0	2	3.0	53.0	4
Marcos Soares; Eduardo Penido	470	2	3.0	1	0.0	6	11.7	1	0.0	5	10.0	~~10~~	~~16.0~~	6	11.7	36.4	Gold
Reinaldo Conrad; Manfred Kaufmann	Flying Dutchman	3	5.7	5	10.0	~~9~~	~~15.0~~	7	13.0	5	10.0	6	11.7	7	13.0	63.4	8
Alexandre Welter; Lars Sigurd Bjorkstrom	Tornado	3	5.7	1	0.0	3	5.7	~~6~~	~~11.7~~	1	0.0	1	0.0	5	10.0	21.4	Gold
Eduardo de Souza; Peter Erzberger	Star	9	15.0	~~11~~	~~17.0~~	8	14.0	8	14.0	9	15.0	11	17.0	5	10.0	85.0	9
Gastão Brun; Vicente Brun; Roberto Luiz Souza	Soling	4	8.0	~~7~~	~~13.0~~	2	3.0	3	5.7	7	13.0	3	5.7	6	11.7	47.1	6

== Shooting ==
Open

Athlete	Event	Final	
Athlete	Event	Score	Rank
Waldemar Capucci	50 m rifle prone	591	32
Sylvio Carvalho	50 m pistol	558	9
Fernando Gomes	25 m rapid fire pistol	588	19
Durval Guimarães	50 m rifle prone	592	25
Marcos José Olsen	Trap	187	18

== Swimming ==
Men

Athlete	Event	Heat		Semifinal		Final	
Athlete	Event	Time	Rank	Time	Rank	Time	Rank
Rômulo Arantes	100 metre backstroke	57.90	2 Q	58.21	5	Did not advance	
Cyro Delgado	100 metre freestyle	53.00	6	Did not advance			
Cyro Delgado	200 metre freestyle	1:54.59	5	Did not advance			
Jorge Fernandes	100 metre freestyle	52.51	4 Q	52.91	8	Did not advance	
Jorge Fernandes	200 metre freestyle	1:54.32	3	Did not advance			
Marcelo Jucá	400 metre freestyle	4:03.92	4	Did not advance			
Marcelo Jucá	1500 metre freestyle	16:01.11	5	Did not advance			
Cláudio Kestener	100 metre butterfly	57.65	4	Did not advance			
Cláudio Kestener	200 metre butterfly	2:08.65	6	Did not advance			
Djan Madruga	400 metre freestyle	3:55.69	1 Q	BYE		3:54.15	4
Djan Madruga	1500 metre freestyle	15:56.20	6	Did not advance			
Djan Madruga	400 m individual medley	4:28.77	1 Q	BYE		4:26.81	5
Marcus Mattioli	200 metre freestyle	1:54.39	3	Did not advance			
Marcus Mattioli	100 metre butterfly	57.96	5	Did not advance			
Marcus Mattioli	200 metre butterfly	2:06.87	3	Did not advance			
Ricardo Prado	100 metre backstroke	1:01.03	6	Did not advance			
Ricardo Prado	400 m individual medley	4:31.69	3	Did not advance			
Sérgio Ribeiro	100 metre breaststroke	1:06.71	5	Did not advance			
Jorge Fernandes; Marcus Mattioli; Cyro Delgado; Djan Madruga	4 × 200 metre freestyle relay	7:32.81	2	BYE		7.29,30	Bronze
Rômulo Arantes; Sérgio Pinto Ribeiro; Cláudio Kestener; Cyro Delgado; Jorge Fernandes	4 × 100 metre medley relay	3.53,23	8 Q	BYE		3.53,23	8

== Volleyball ==
=== Men ===
==== Pool B ====
Pos	Team	Pld	W	L	Pts	SW	SL	SR	SPW	SPL	SPR	Qualification
1	Poland	4	3	1	7	11	5	2.200	221	172	1.285	Semifinals
2	Romania	4	3	1	7	10	5	2.000	215	138	1.558	Semifinals
3	Brazil	4	2	2	6	9	8	1.125	215	196	1.097	5th–8th semifinals
4	Yugoslavia	4	2	2	6	8	8	1.000	189	177	1.068	5th–8th semifinals
5	Libya	4	0	4	4	0	12	0.000	23	180	0.128	9th place match

Date	Venue		Score		Set 1	Set 2	Set 3	Set 4	Set 5	Total
22 Jul	DMA	Yugoslavia	3–2	Brazil	8–15	15–12	10–15	15–4	15–12	63–58
24 Jul	MAC	Romania	3–1	Brazil	13–15	15–4	15–12	15–3		58–34
26 Jul	DMA	Brazil	3–0	Libya	15–1	15–2	15–6			45–9
28 Jul	DMA	Brazil	3–2	Poland	13–15	18–20	17–15	15–11	15–5	78–66

==== 5th–8th semifinals ====
Date	Venue		Score		Set 1	Set 2	Set 3	Set 4	Set 5	Total
30 Jul	DMA	Czechoslovakia	0–3	Brazil	14–16	11–15	9–15			34–46

==== 5th place match ====
Date	Venue		Score		Set 1	Set 2	Set 3	Set 4	Set 5	Total
01 Aug	DMA	Yugoslavia	2–3	Brazil	16–14	9–15	15–8	10–15	8–15	58–67

Team Roster

- João Alves Granjeiro
- Mario Xandó Oliveira Neto
- Antonio Gueiros Badalhoca
- José Montanaro
- Antonio Carlos Moreno
- Renan Dal Zotto
- William Carvalho Silva
- Amauri Ribeiro
- Bernardo Rezende
- Jean Luc Rosat
- Deraldo Wanderley
- Bernard Rajzman

=== Women ===
==== Group B ====
Pos	Team	Pld	W	L	Pts	SW	SL	SR	SPW	SPL	SPR	Qualification
1	Bulgaria	3	2	1	5	7	4	1.750	138	114	1.211	1st–4th semifinals
2	Hungary	3	2	1	5	8	6	1.333	161	170	0.947	1st–4th semifinals
3	Romania	3	2	1	5	7	7	1.000	157	153	1.026	5th–8th semifinals
4	Brazil	3	0	3	3	4	9	0.444	152	171	0.889	5th–8th semifinals

Date		Score		Set 1	Set 2	Set 3	Set 4	Set 5	Total	Report
21 Jul	Hungary	3–2	Brazil	17–15	9–15	15–12	6–15	15–12	62–69	Report
23 Jul	Bulgaria	3–0	Brazil	15–7	15–9	15–12			45–28	Report
25 Jul	Brazil	2–3	Romania	15–10	15–9	6–15	13–15	6–15	55–64	Report

==== 5th–8th place semifinals ====
Date	Time		Score		Set 1	Set 2	Set 3	Set 4	Set 5	Total	Report
27 Jul	19:30	Cuba	3–0	Brazil	15–2	15–5	15–6			45–13	Report

==== 7th place match ====
Date	Time		Score		Set 1	Set 2	Set 3	Set 4	Set 5	Total	Report
29 Jul	16:00	Romania	0–3	Brazil	8–15	12–15	12–15			32–45	Report

Team Roster

- Denise Porto Mattioli
- Ivonette Das Neves
- Lenice Peluso Oliveira
- Regina Vilela Santos
- Fernanda Emerick Silva
- Paula Hernandez Rodrigues Mello
- Isabel Salgado
- Eliana Maria Aleixo
- Maria Castanheira
- Jaqueline Silva
- Vera Mossa
- Rita Teixeira

== Weightlifting ==
Men

Athlete	Event	Snatch		Clean & Jerk		Total	Rank
Athlete	Event	Result	Rank	Result	Rank	Total	Rank
Durval de Moraes	52 kg	80	18	107.5	14	187.5	16
Paulo Batista de Sene	60 kg	100	14	0	NVL	100	AC
