= Basketball at the 1980 Summer Olympics =

10th Olympic Basketball Tournament
- Moscow 1980

Tournament details
- Olympics: 1980 Summer Olympics
- Host nation: Soviet Union
- City: Moscow
- Duration: 20–30 July 1980

Men's tournament
- Teams: 12
Medals
Gold medalists	Yugoslavia
Silver medalists	Italy
Bronze medalists	Soviet Union

Women's tournament
- Teams: 6
Medals
Gold medalists	Soviet Union
Silver medalists	Bulgaria
Bronze medalists	Yugoslavia

Tournaments
← Montreal 1976	Los Angeles 1984 →

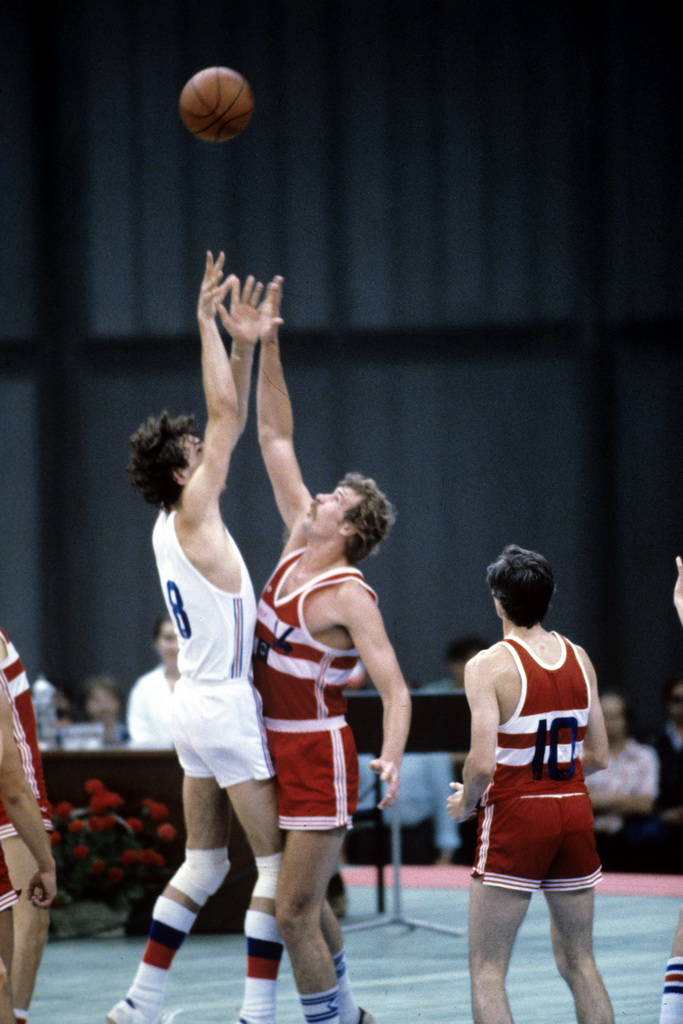
Czechoslovakia's Stanislav Kropilák taking on Aleksandr Belostenny of the Soviet Union at the 1980 Summer Olympics.

Basketball at the 1980 Summer Olympics was the tenth appearance of the sport of basketball as an official Olympic medal event. It was held from July 20 to July 30 at the Olympiiski Indoor Stadium and at the CSKA Sports Palace, both located in Moscow, Russian SFSR, Soviet Union. Finals of men's events were held 30 July at the Olympiiski Indoor Stadium.

Due to the American-led boycott of the 1980 Summer Olympics, the United States and other nations withdrew from the tournament. The 1980 Olympics marked the second time (after a controversy in 1972) that the United States men's team did not win the gold medal in Olympic basketball; Yugoslavia won gold in the men's tournament and the Soviet Union in the women's competition.

== Medal summary ==
Event	Gold	Silver	Bronze
Men's	Yugoslavia; Andro Knego; Dragan Kićanović; Rajko Žižić; Mihovil Nakić; Željko Jerkov; Branko Skroče; Zoran Slavnić; Krešimir Ćosić; Ratko Radovanović; Duje Krstulović; Dražen Dalipagić; Mirza Delibašić	Italy; Fabrizio Della Fiori; Marco Solfrini; Marco Bonamico; Dino Meneghin; Renato Villalta; Renzo Vecchiato; Pierluigi Marzorati; Pietro Generali; Romeo Sacchetti; Roberto Brunamonti; Michael Sylvester; Enrico Gilardi	Soviet Union; Stanislav Yeryomin; Valeri Miloserdov; Sergei Tarakanov; Aleksandr Salnikov; Andrey Lopatov; Nikolai Deriugin; Sergei Belov; Vladimir Tkachenko; Anatoly Myshkin; Sergejus Jovaiša; Aleksandr Belostenny; Vladimir Zhigily
Women's	Soviet Union; Olga Barysheva; Tatyana Ivinskaya; Nelli Feryabnikova; Vida Beselienė; Tatyana Ovechkina; Angelė Rupšienė; Lyubov Sharmay; Uljana Semjonova; Tetiana Nadyrova; Olga Sukharnova; Nadezhda Shuvayeva-Olkhova; Lyudmila Rogozhina	Bulgaria; Krasimira Bogdanova; Vanya Dermendzhieva; Silviya Germanova; Petkana Makaveeva; Nadka Golcheva; Penka Stoyanova; Evladiya Slavcheva; Kostadinka Radkova; Snezhana Mikhaylova; Angelina Mikhaylova; Penka Metodieva; Diana Dilova	Yugoslavia; Vera Đurašković; Mersada Bećirspahić; Jelica Komnenović; Mira Bjedov; Vukica Mitić; Sanja Ožegović; Sofija Pekić; Marija Tonković; Zorica Đurković; Vesna Despotović; Biljana Majstorović; Jasmina Perazić

== Qualification ==
A NOC may enter up to one men's team with 12 players and up to one women's team with 12 players. Automatic qualifications were granted to the host country for both events, plus the winning team at the 1978 FIBA World Championship and the gold medal winners at the 1976 Summer Olympics. The remaining spots were decided by corresponding continental qualifying tournaments for the men's competition, and in a tournament held months before the Olympic Games in Varna, Bulgaria for the women's event.

=== Men ===
Means of qualification	Date	Venue	Berths	Qualified
Host nation	23 October 1974	(Austria) Vienna	1	Soviet Union
1976 Summer Olympics	18–27 July 1976	(Canada) Montréal	~~1~~ 0	~~United States~~^{[a]}
1978 FIBA World Championship	1–14 October 1978	Philippines	1	Yugoslavia
1979 FIBA Oceania Championship	5–8 August 1979	Australia	1	Australia
1979 ABC Championship	30 November – 12 December 1979	(Japan) Nagoya	1	~~China~~^{[a]} India^{[b]}
FIBA Africa Championship 1980	22–30 March 1980	(Morocco) Rabat	1	Senegal
1980 Tournament of the Americas	18–25 April 1980	(Puerto Rico) San Juan	~~3~~ 2	~~Puerto Rico~~^{[a]} ~~Canada~~^{[a]} ~~Argentina~~^{[a]} Brazil^{[b]} Cuba^{[b]}
European Qualifying Tournament	6–17 May 1980	Switzerland	~~3~~ 5	Italy; Czechoslovakia; Spain; Sweden^{[b]} Poland^{[b]}
Total			12	

=== Women ===
Means of qualification	Date	Venue	Berths	Qualified
Host nation	23 October 1974	(Austria) Vienna	1	Soviet Union
World Qualifying Tournament	5–15 May 1980	(Bulgaria) Varna	5	~~United States~~^{[a]} Bulgaria; Cuba; Yugoslavia; Italy; Hungary^{[b]}
Total			6	

- ^{a} Withdrew from the tournament.
- ^{b} Replacement teams.

== Format ==
Men's tournament:

- Three round-robin groups of four teams were formed, where the top two from each one advanced to the final round, and the remaining teams to the classification round.
- Both the final and classification round groups consisted of another round-robin of six teams each where results between teams from the same preliminary group were carried over. The top two teams from the final round competed for the gold medal, while third and fourth places for bronze.
- With the exception of the first four places, the final standings were decided by the corresponding places in each group.

Women's tournament:

- One round-robin group is formed containing all six teams, where the top two compete for the gold medal, while the third and fourth places compete for the bronze medal in an additional match.
- The remaining two teams finish with their group rank in the final standings.

Tie-breaking criteria:

1. Head to head results
2. Goal average (not the goal difference) between the tied teams
3. Goal average of the tied teams for all teams in its group

== Men's tournament ==
=== Preliminary round ===
The top two teams from each group advance to the final round group, while the remaining teams compete for 8th through 12th places in the classification group. Hosts Soviet Union and the world champions Yugoslavia advanced undefeated to the final round. Meanwhile, qualification in Group C was closely contested between Italy, Cuba and Australia, which ended up being decided by a third tiebreaker in favor of the first two teams.

==== Group A ====
Pos	Team	Pld	W	L	PF	PA	PD	Pts	Qualification
1	Soviet Union (H)	3	3	0	321	235	+86	6	Semi-final round
2	Brazil	3	2	1	297	235	+62	5	Semi-final round
3	Czechoslovakia	3	1	2	285	236	+49	4	Classification round
4	India	3	0	3	194	391	−197	3	Classification round

Source: FIBA
Rules for classification: 1) points; 2) head-to-head points; 3) head-to-head goal average; 4) head-to-head number of points scored.
(H) Hosts

20 July 1980
13:00

Boxscore

Brazil	72–70	Czechoslovakia
Scoring by half: 46–37, 26–33
Pts: Schmidt 23; Rebs: Marcel 11; Asts: Setrini 2		Pts: Kropilák 21; Rebs: Kropilák 11; Asts: Hraška, Klimeš 2

Olympiiski, Moscow

20 July 1980
20:15

Boxscore

India	65–121	Soviet Union
Scoring by half: 38–60, 27–61
Pts: A. Singh 22; Rebs: A. Singh 5 Asts: Han. Singh 3		Pts: Deryugin, Salnikov 17; Rebs: Deryugin 10; Asts: Yeryomin 5

Olympiiski, Moscow

21 July 1980
13:00

Boxscore

Czechoslovakia	133–65	India
Scoring by half: 63–36, 70–29
Pts: Brabenec 28; Rebs: Douša, Kropilák 6 Asts: Pospíšil 8		Pts: A. Singh 35; Rebs: five players 2 Asts: Han. Singh 10

Olympiiski, Moscow

21 July 1980
18:00

Boxscore

Brazil	88–101	Soviet Union
Scoring by half: 42–48, 46–53
Pts: Schmidt 25		Pts: Belov 25

Olympiiski, Moscow

23 July 1980
11:00

Boxscore

Brazil	137–64	India
Scoring by half: 65–28, 72–36
Pts: Schmidt 26; Rebs: Schmidt 13; Asts: Setrini 5		Pts: Shyam 32; Rebs: A. Singh 5 Asts: Han. Singh 4

Olympiiski, Moscow

23 July 1980
18:00

Boxscore

Soviet Union	99–82	Czechoslovakia
Scoring by half: 46–40, 53–42
Pts: Belov 26		Pts: Kropilák 31

Olympiiski, Moscow

==== Group B ====
Pos	Team	Pld	W	L	PF	PA	PD	Pts	Qualification
1	Yugoslavia	3	3	0	328	249	+79	6	Semi-final round
2	Spain	3	2	1	289	241	+48	5	Semi-final round
3	Poland	3	1	2	256	297	−41	4	Classification round
4	Senegal	3	0	3	196	282	−86	3	Classification round

Source: FIBA
Rules for classification: 1) points; 2) head-to-head points; 3) head-to-head goal average; 4) head-to-head number of points scored.

21 July 1980
11:00

Boxscore

Senegal	67–104	Yugoslavia
Scoring by half: 39–59, 28–45
Pts: Diagne 18; Rebs: Diagne 10; Asts: Dia 3		Pts: Dalipagić 23; Rebs: Ćosić 10; Asts: Delibašić 4

Olympiiski, Moscow

21 July 1980
20:15

Boxscore

Poland	81–104	Spain
Scoring by half: 43–50, 38–54
Pts: Młynarski 27; Rebs: Fikiel 8 Asts: Kijewski 4		Pts: Sibilio 27; Rebs: De la Cruz 12; Asts: Solozábal 5

Olympiiski, Moscow

22 July 1980
13:00

Boxscore

Senegal	65–94	Spain
Scoring by half: 26–55, 39–39
Pts: Diagne 27; Rebs: Diagne 15; Asts: Faye 4		Pts: Sibilio 32; Rebs: Romay 11; Asts: López, San Epifanio 3

Olympiiski, Moscow

22 July 1980
20:15

Boxscore

Yugoslavia	129–91	Poland
Scoring by half: 61–43, 68–48
Pts: Dalipagić 27; Rebs: Kićanović 8 Asts: Kićanović 5		Pts: Fikiel 19; Rebs: three players 6 Asts: Zelig 2

Olympiiski, Moscow

23 July 1980
13:00

Boxscore

Senegal	64–84	Poland
Scoring by half: 30–44, 34–40
Pts: Ma. Diop, Tall 13		Pts: Młynarski 30

Olympiiski, Moscow

23 July 1980
20:15

Boxscore

Spain	91–95	Yugoslavia
Scoring by half: 50–45, 41–50
Pts: Brabender 30		Pts: Kićanović 25

Olympiiski, Moscow

==== Group C ====
Pos	Team	Pld	W	L	PF	PA	PD	Pts	Qualification
1	(International Olympic Committee) Italy	3	2	1	248	233	+15	5 (Note: Italy 1–1, 1.000, 1.064; Cuba 1–1, 1.000, 1.056; Australia 1–1, 1.000, 1.042)	Semi-final round
2	Cuba	3	2	1	226	214	+12	5	Semi-final round
3	(International Olympic Committee) Australia	3	2	1	224	215	+9	5	Classification round
4	Sweden	3	0	3	191	227	−36	3	Classification round

Source: FIBA
Rules for classification: 1) points; 2) head-to-head points; 3) head-to-head goal average; 4) head-to-head number of points scored.
Notes:

20 July 1980
13:00

Boxscore

Italy (International Olympic Committee)	92–77	Sweden
Scoring by half: 50–34, 42–43

CSKA Sports Palace, Moscow

20 July 1980
20:15

Boxscore

Cuba	83–76	(International Olympic Committee) Australia
Scoring by half: 40–40, 43–36

CSKA Sports Palace, Moscow

21 July 1980
18:00

Boxscore

Sweden	59–71	Cuba
Scoring by half: 32–39, 27–32

CSKA Sports Palace, Moscow

21 July 1980
20:15

Boxscore

Italy (International Olympic Committee)	77–84	(International Olympic Committee) Australia
Scoring by half: 34–44, 43–40

CSKA Sports Palace, Moscow

23 July 1980
18:00

Boxscore

Australia (International Olympic Committee)	64–55	Sweden
Scoring by half: 40–27, 24–28

CSKA Sports Palace, Moscow

23 July 1980
20:15

Boxscore

Italy (International Olympic Committee)	79–72	Cuba
Scoring by half: 43–42, 36–30

CSKA Sports Palace, Moscow

=== Classification round ===
Results between Poland vs. Senegal, Australia vs. Sweden and Czechoslovakia vs. India were carried over from the preliminary round.

Pos	Team	Pld	W	L	PF	PA	PD	Pts
7	Poland	5	4	1	453	359	+94	9 (Note: Australia 74–101 Poland)
8	(International Olympic Committee) Australia	5	4	1	417	381	+36	9
9	Czechoslovakia	5	3	2	474	377	+97	8 (Note: Sweden 61–83 Czechoslovakia)
10	Sweden	5	3	2	375	341	+34	8
11	Senegal	5	1	4	345	396	−51	6
12	India	5	0	5	329	539	−210	5

Source: FIBA
Rules for classification: 1) points; 2) head-to-head points; 3) head-to-head goal average; 4) head-to-head number of points scored.
Notes:

25 July 1980
11:00

Boxscore

Poland	113–67	India
Scoring by half: 63–33, 50–34

CSKA Sports Palace, Moscow

25 July 1980
13:00

Boxscore

Sweden	70–64	Senegal
Scoring by half: 32–29, 38–35

CSKA Sports Palace, Moscow

25 July 1980
18:00

Boxscore

Australia (International Olympic Committee)	91–86	Czechoslovakia
Scoring by half: 41–44, 50–42

CSKA Sports Palace, Moscow

26 July 1980
11:00

Boxscore

Senegal	81–59	India
Scoring by half: 37–31, 44–28

CSKA Sports Palace, Moscow

26 July 1980
13:00

Boxscore

Sweden	61–83	Czechoslovakia
Scoring by half: 35–39, 26–44

CSKA Sports Palace, Moscow

26 July 1980
18:00

Boxscore

Australia (International Olympic Committee)	74–101	Poland
Scoring by half: 35–42, 39–59

CSKA Sports Palace, Moscow

27 July 1980
11:00

Boxscore

Sweden	119–63	India
Scoring by half: 52–29, 67–34

CSKA Sports Palace, Moscow

27 July 1980
13:00

Boxscore

Senegal	64–95	(International Olympic Committee) Australia
Scoring by half: 37–51, 27–44

CSKA Sports Palace, Moscow

27 July 1980
18:00

Boxscore

Czechoslovakia	84–88	Poland
Scoring by half: 48–46, 36–42

CSKA Sports Palace, Moscow

28 July 1980
11:00

Boxscore

India	75–93	(International Olympic Committee) Australia
Scoring by half: 41–37, 34–56

CSKA Sports Palace, Moscow

28 July 1980
13:00

Boxscore

Czechoslovakia	88–72	Senegal
Scoring by half: 50–36, 38–36

CSKA Sports Palace, Moscow

28 July 1980
20:15

Boxscore

Sweden	70–67	Poland
Scoring by half: 40–33, 30–34

CSKA Sports Palace, Moscow

=== Semi-final round ===
The first two places in the final round compete for the gold medal, while the third and fourth places compete for the bronze. The remaining teams' group ranking determines their positions in the final standings. The host nation failed to compete for the gold in spite of finishing the preliminary round undefeated, due to losses against the other two group leaders Yugoslavia and especially Italy, since the result from that match served as tiebreaker, giving the latter a passport to the gold medal match. The Soviet Union then won the bronze against Spain. Yugoslavia earned their first gold medal in men's basketball at this Olympic Games.

Results from Yugoslavia vs. Spain, Italy vs. Cuba and Soviet Union vs. Brazil were carried over from the preliminary round.

Pos	Team	Pld	W	L	PF	PA	PD	Pts	Qualification
1	Yugoslavia	5	5	0	506	442	+64	10	Gold medal game
2	(International Olympic Committee) Italy	5	3	2	419	438	−19	8 (Note: Soviet Union 85–87 Italy)	Gold medal game
3	Soviet Union (H)	5	3	2	505	468	+37	8	Bronze medal game
4	Spain	5	2	3	488	485	+3	7 (Note: Spain 110–81 Brazil)	Bronze medal game
5	Brazil	5	2	3	448	477	−29	7	
6	Cuba	5	0	5	434	490	−56	5	

Source: FIBA
Rules for classification: 1) points; 2) head-to-head points; 3) head-to-head goal average; 4) head-to-head number of points scored.
(H) Hosts
Notes:

25 July 1980
11:00

Boxscore

Brazil	94–93	Cuba
Scoring by half: 55–55, 39–38
Pts: Schmidt 24; Rebs: Schmidt 7 Asts: Leite 2		Pts: R. Herrera 33; Rebs: Luaces 10; Asts: T. Herrera, Urgelles 2

Olympiiski, Moscow

25 July 1980
18:00

Boxscore

Soviet Union	119–102	Spain
Scoring by half: 53–44, 66–58
Pts: Belov, Myshkin 23; Rebs: Tkachenko 9 Asts: Belov, Yeryomin 3		Pts: San Epifanio 21; Rebs: De la Cruz 5 Asts: Llorente 2

Olympiiski, Moscow

25 July 1980
20:15

Boxscore

Yugoslavia	102–81	(International Olympic Committee) Italy
Scoring by half: 48–38, 54–43
Pts: Kićanović 31		Pts: Meneghin 16

Olympiiski, Moscow

26 July 1980
11:00

Boxscore

Spain	110–81	Brazil
Scoring by half: 52–34, 58–47
Pts: Sibilio 33; Rebs: De la Cruz 15; Asts: Corbalán 5		Pts: Leite 17; Rebs: Leite 8 Asts: four players 1

Olympiiski, Moscow

26 July 1980
13:00

Boxscore

Cuba	84–112	Yugoslavia
Scoring by half: 41–55, 43–57
Pts: Luaces 21; Rebs: Dubois 9 Asts: four players 1		Pts: Kićanović 28; Rebs: Jerkov, Nakić 8 Asts: Delibašić, Kićanović 3

Olympiiski, Moscow

26 July 1980
20:15

Boxscore

Soviet Union	85–87	(International Olympic Committee) Italy
Scoring by half: 39–47, 46–40
Pts: Belov 20; Rebs: Tkachenko 9 Asts: Yeryomin 8		Pts: Villalta 21; Rebs: Meneghin 7 Asts: Meneghin 2

Olympiiski, Moscow

27 July 1980
11:00

Boxscore

Cuba	95–96 (OT)	Spain
Scoring by half: 50–43, 36–43 Overtime: 9–10
Pts: R. Herrera 28; Rebs: Morales 12; Asts: Urgelles 3		Pts: Sibilio 26; Rebs: De la Cruz 11; Asts: Corbalán 5

Olympiiski, Moscow

27 July 1980
18:00

Boxscore

Soviet Union	91–101 (OT)	Yugoslavia
Scoring by half: 42–48, 39–33 Overtime: 10–20
Pts: Belov 20; Rebs: Belostenny, Tkachenko 9 Asts: Belov, Myshkin 2		Pts: Dalipagić 28; Rebs: Ćosić 8 Asts: Ćosić, Kićanović 2

Olympiiski, Moscow

27 July 1980
20:15

Boxscore

Italy (International Olympic Committee)	77–90	Brazil
Scoring by half: 39–34, 38–56
Pts: Villalta 16; Rebs: Villalta 12; Asts: Della Fiori, Generali 2		Pts: Schmidt 33; Rebs: Schmidt 9 Asts: Setrini 4

Olympiiski, Moscow

29 July 1980
13:00

Boxscore

Spain	89–95	(International Olympic Committee) Italy
Scoring by half: 46–48, 43–47
Pts: Sibilio 24; Rebs: De la Cruz 6 Asts: Sibilio 1		Pts: Meneghin 29; Rebs: Meneghin 11; Asts: four players 1

Olympiiski, Moscow

29 July 1980
18:00

Boxscore

Soviet Union	109–90	Cuba
Scoring by half: 61–40, 48–50
Pts: Salnikov 19; Rebs: Tkachenko 9 Asts: Yeryomin 5		Pts: Morales 25; Rebs: Morales 9 Asts: T. Herrera 4

Olympiiski, Moscow

29 July 1980
20:15

Boxscore

Brazil	95–96	Yugoslavia
Scoring by half: 49–47, 46–49
Pts: Schmidt 22; Rebs: Nascimento 7 Asts: Setrini 1		Pts: Dalipagić 26; Rebs: Ćosić, Dalipagić 7 Asts: three players 1

Olympiiski, Moscow

=== Medal matches ===
==== Bronze medal game ====
30 July 1980
13:00

Boxscore

Soviet Union	117–94	Spain
Scoring by half: 51–38, 66–56
Pts: Belov 29; Rebs: Belostenny 8 Asts: three players 3		Pts: López 23; Rebs: De la Cruz, Romay 6 Asts: Solozábal 6

Olympiiski, Moscow

==== Gold medal game ====
30 July 1980
20:15

Boxscore

Yugoslavia	86–77	(International Olympic Committee) Italy
Scoring by half: 42–37, 44–40
Pts: Kićanović 22; Rebs: Jerkov 13; Asts: three players 2		Pts: Villalta 29; Rebs: Vecchiato 7 Asts: Meneghin 4

Olympiiski, Moscow

== Women's tournament ==
The women's tournament was decided in a round robin group with all six teams. The first two places competed for the gold medal, while the third and fourth places for the bronze. The remaining teams retain their group ranks for the final standings. The host nation finished the group phase undefeated and won the gold against Bulgaria. Yugoslavia would go on to win the bronze medal against Hungary.

Pos	Team	Pld	W	L	PF	PA	PD	Pts	Qualification
1	Soviet Union (H)	5	5	0	553	316	+237	10	Gold medal game
2	Bulgaria	5	4	1	440	405	+35	9	Gold medal game
3	Yugoslavia	5	3	2	356	364	−8	8	Bronze medal game
4	Hungary	5	2	3	344	407	−63	7	Bronze medal game
5	Cuba	5	1	4	346	403	−57	6	
6	(International Olympic Committee) Italy	5	0	5	308	452	−144	5	

Source: FIBA
Rules for classification: 1) points; 2) head-to-head points; 3) head-to-head goal average; 4) head-to-head number of points scored.
(H) Hosts

20 July 1980
11:00

Boxscore

Italy (International Olympic Committee)	65–102	Bulgaria
Scoring by half: 40–50, 25–52

Olympiiski, Moscow

20 July 1980
18:00

Boxscore

Yugoslavia	62–97	Soviet Union
Scoring by half: 27–58, 35–39

Olympiiski, Moscow

20 July 1980
18:00

Boxscore

Cuba	66–76	Hungary
Scoring by half: 23–36, 43–40

CSKA Sports Palace, Moscow

22 July 1980
11:00

Boxscore

Cuba	81–85	Yugoslavia
Scoring by half: 36–41, 45–44

Olympiiski, Moscow

22 July 1980
18:00

Boxscore

Bulgaria	83–122	Soviet Union
Scoring by half: 42–69, 41–53

Olympiiski, Moscow

22 July 1980
18:00

Boxscore

Italy (International Olympic Committee)	70–83	Hungary
Scoring by half: 37–45, 33–38

CSKA Sports Palace, Moscow

24 July 1980
13:00

Boxscore

Hungary	48–61	Yugoslavia
Scoring by half: 26–28, 22–33

Olympiiski, Moscow

24 July 1980
18:00

Boxscore

Bulgaria	84–64	Cuba
Scoring by half: 45–32, 39–32

Olympiiski, Moscow

24 July 1980
20:15

Boxscore

Italy (International Olympic Committee)	53–119	Soviet Union
Scoring by half: 25–55, 28–64

Olympiiski, Moscow

25 July 1980
13:00

Boxscore

Italy (International Olympic Committee)	57–69	Yugoslavia
Scoring by half: 29–33, 28–36

Olympiiski, Moscow

26 July 1980
18:00

Boxscore

Soviet Union	95–56	Cuba
Scoring by half: 57–17, 38–39

Olympiiski, Moscow

27 July 1980
13:00

Boxscore

Hungary	75–90	Bulgaria
Scoring by half: 35–53, 40–37

Olympiiski, Moscow

28 July 1980
11:00

Boxscore

Italy (International Olympic Committee)	63–79	Cuba
Scoring by half: 32–40, 31–39

Olympiiski, Moscow

28 July 1980
13:00

Boxscore

Yugoslavia	79–81	Bulgaria
Scoring by half: 41–44, 38–37

Olympiiski, Moscow

28 July 1980
18:00

Boxscore

Soviet Union	120–62	Hungary
Scoring by half: 63–34, 57–28

Olympiiski, Moscow

=== Medal matches ===
==== Bronze medal game ====
30 July 1980
11:00

Boxscore

Yugoslavia	68–65	Hungary
Scoring by half: 39–29, 29–36
Pts: Pekić 29; Rebs: Komnenović 6 Asts: Ðurković 2		Pts: Jacsó-Kiss 18; Rebs: Boksay 8 Asts: Szuchy 2

Olympiiski, Moscow

==== Gold medal game ====
30 July 1980
18:00

Boxscore

Soviet Union	104–73	Bulgaria
Scoring by half: 61–41, 43–32
Pts: Semjonova 27; Rebs: Semjonova 21; Asts: three players 3		Pts: Slavcheva 19; Rebs: Bogdanova 4 Asts: Metodieva 2

Olympiiski, Moscow

== Final standings ==
Rank	Men				Women			
Rank	Team	Pld	W	L	Team	Pld	W	L
1st place, gold medalist(s)	Yugoslavia	8	8	0	Soviet Union	6	6	0
2nd place, silver medalist(s)	(International Olympic Committee) Italy	8	4	4	Bulgaria	6	4	2
3rd place, bronze medalist(s)	Soviet Union	8	6	2	Yugoslavia	6	4	2
4th	Spain	8	4	4	Hungary	6	2	4
5th	Brazil	7	4	3	Cuba	5	1	4
6th	Cuba	7	2	5	(International Olympic Committee) Italy	5	0	5
7th	Poland	7	4	3				
8th	(International Olympic Committee) Australia	7	5	2				
9th	Czechoslovakia	7	3	4				
10th	Sweden	7	3	4				
11th	Senegal	7	1	6				
12th	India	7	0	7				

== See also ==
- Basketball at the 1980 Summer Olympics – Men's team rosters
- Basketball at the 1980 Summer Olympics – Women's team rosters
