= Boxing at the 1980 Summer Olympics – Light middleweight =

Boxing competitions

Light middleweight boxing at the Games of the XXII Olympiad
- Venue: Olympiysky Sports Complex
- Date: 23 July – 2 August 1980
- Competitors: 23 from 23 nations

Medalists
1st place, gold medalist(s)		Armando Martínez	Cuba
2nd place, silver medalist(s)		Aleksandr Koshkin	Soviet Union
3rd place, bronze medalist(s)		Ján Franek	Czechoslovakia
3rd place, bronze medalist(s)		Detlef Kästner	East Germany

The light middleweight boxing competition at the 1980 Olympic Games in Moscow was held from 23 July to 2 August at the Olympiysky Sports Complex. 23 boxers from 23 nations competed.

== Schedule ==
Date	Time	Round
Wednesday, 23 July 1980	12:00; 18:00	Round of 32
Monday, 28 July 1980	12:00; 18:00	Round of 16
Wednesday, 30 July 1980	19:00	Quarterfinals
Thursday, 31 July 1980	19:00	Semifinals
Saturday, 2 August 1980	15:00	Final

== Results ==
=== Finals ===
Semifinals
Detlef Kästner (GDR)	0
Aleksandr Koshkin (URS)	5
Ján Franek (TCH)
Armando Martínez (CUB)	RSC

Final
Aleksandr Koshkin (URS)	1
Armando Martínez (CUB)	4

=== Top half ===
Round of 32

Round of 16
Leonidas Njunwa (TAN)
Imad Idriss (SYR)	DSQ
Adeoye Adetunji (NGR)
Detlef Kästner (GDR)	KO
Aleksandr Koshkin (URS)	KO
Salah Jassim Beden (IRQ)
Nick Wilshire (GBR)	3
Miodrag Perunović (YUG)	2

Quarterfinals
Leonidas Njunwa (TAN)	0
Detlef Kästner (GDR)	5
Aleksandr Koshkin (URS)	KO
Nick Wilshire (GBR)

Semifinals
Detlef Kästner (GDR)	0
Aleksandr Koshkin (URS)	5

=== Bottom half ===
Round of 32
Jackson Rivera (VEN)	5
Roger Houangni (BEN)	0
Mohamed Halibi (LIB)	0
Zhelyu Stefanov (BUL)	5
Benedetto Gravina (ITA)
Ján Franek (TCH)	KO
Seifu Retta (ETH)	0
George Kabuto (UGA)	5
Zygmunt Gosiewski (POL)	0
Armando Martínez (CUB)	5
Marcel Sîrba (ROU)	2
Leo Vainonen (SWE)	3
Francisco de Jesus (BRA)	5
Mbemba Camara (GUI)	0

Round of 16
Wilson Kaoma (ZAM)
Jackson Rivera (VEN)	DSQ
Zhelio Stefanov (BUL)	DSQ
' Ján Franek (TCH)
George Kabuto (UGA)
Armando Martínez (CUB)	RSC
Leo Vainonen (SWE)	0
Francisco de Jesus (BRA)	5

Quarterfinals
Wilson Kaoma (ZAM)
Ján Franek (TCH)	KO
Armando Martínez (CUB)	5
Francisco de Jesus (BRA)	0

Semifinals
Ján Franek (TCH)
Armando Martínez (CUB)	RSC
