= Detlef Kästner =

German boxer

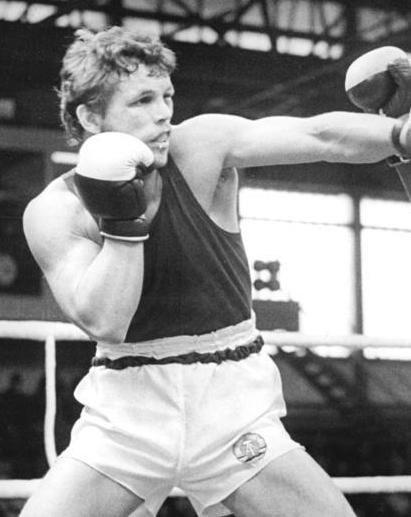
- Kästner boxing in Halle, 1982

Personal information
- Full name: Detlef Kästner
- Nationality: East Germany
- Born: 20 March 1958 (age 68) Wurzen, East Germany
- Height: 1.74 m (5 ft 9 in)
- Weight: 71 kg (157 lb)

Sport
- Sport: Boxing
- Weight class: Light middleweight
- Club: SC Dynamo Berlin, Berlin
Medal record
Men's boxing
Representing East Germany
Olympic Games
Bronze medal – third place	1980 Moscow	Light middleweight

Detlef Kästner (born 20 March 1958) is a retired boxer, who represented East Germany at the 1980 Summer Olympics in Moscow, Soviet Union. There he won the bronze medal in the light middleweight division (– 71 kg), after being defeated in the semifinals by eventual silver medalist Aleksandr Koshkyn of the USSR.

== Olympic results ==
- 1st round bye
- Defeated Adeoye Adetunji (Nigeria) KO 3
- Defeated Leonidas Njunwa (Tanzania) 5–0
- Lost to Aleksandr Koshkin (Soviet Union) 0–5
