= Armando Martínez (boxer) =

Cuban boxer (born 1961)

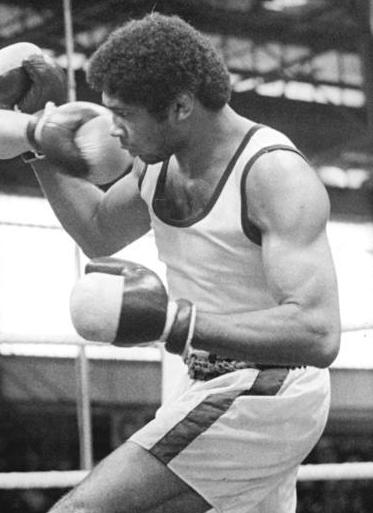
- Armando Martinez, 1982

Personal information
- Full name: Armando Martínez Limendu
- Nationality: Cuba
- Born: 29 August 1961 (age 64) Majagua, Ciego de Ávila
- Height: 1.80 m (5 ft 11 in)
- Weight: 71 kg (157 lb)

Sport
- Sport: Boxing
- Weight class: Light Middleweight
Medal record
Olympic Games
Gold medal – first place	1980 Moscow	Light Middleweight
World Amateur Championships
Silver medal – second place	1982 Munich	Light Middleweight

Armando Martínez Limendu (born 29 August 1961) is a Cuban boxer. At 18 years of age he won the gold medal in the Light Middleweight (71 kg) category at the 1980 Summer Olympics, beating Aleksandr Koshkyn in the final.

In 1982 he won the silver medal at the World Championships in Munich, West Germany, this time losing to Koshkyn. He had previously won a silver medal at the 1978 World Championships.

== 1980 Olympic results ==
Below are the results of Armando Martinez, a Cuban light middleweight boxer who competed at the 1980 Moscow Olympics:

- Round of 32: Defeated Zygmunt Gosiewski (Poland) on points, 5–0
- Round of 16: Defeated George Kabuto (Uganda) referee stopped contest in first round
- Quarterfinal: Defeated Francisco de Jesus (Brazil) on points, 5–0
- Semifinal: Defeated Jan Franek (Czechoslovakia) referee stopped contest in second round
- Final: Defeated Aleksandr Koshkyn (Soviet Union) on points, 4-1 (won gold medal)
