= Eduardo Agra =

Brazilian basketball player

Personal information
- Born: 31 July 1956 (age 70) Recife, Brazil
- Listed height: 6 ft 4.5 in (1.94 m)
- Listed weight: 175 lb (79 kg)
- Position: Small forward

Career highlights
- FIBA Intercontinental Cup champion (1979); Brazilian champion (1978)

Eduardo Nilton Agra Galvão, commonly known as Eduardo Agra (born 31 July 1956), is a Brazilian former professional basketball player.

== Career ==
During his pro club career, Agra won the 1979 edition of the FIBA Intercontinental Cup, while a member of EC Sírio. With the senior Brazilian national basketball team, Agra competed at the 1978 FIBA World Cup, and the 1984 Summer Olympics.
