= Gilcimar =

Gilcimar may refer to:

== Footballers ==
- Gilcimar (footballer, born 1958), Brazilian footballer
- Gilcimar (footballer, born 1981), Brazilian forward
