= Sirba =

Sirba may refer to:

- Paul Sirba (1960 – 2019), American prelate of the Roman Catholic Church
- Marcel Sîrba (born 1957), Romanian boxer
- Sârbă or sîrba, Romanian folk dance
- Sirba River, tributary of the Niger River in western Africa
- Sirba, West Darfur, Sudan
