= Esporte Clube Sírio =

Sírio
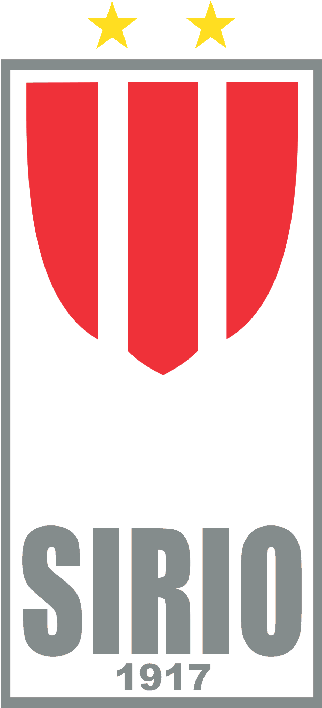
- Founded: 14 July 1917; 108 years ago
- Arena: Ginásio Esporte Clube Sírio
- Location: São Paulo, Brazil
- Team colors: Red, White
- Championships: 1 FIBA Intercontinental Cup; 8 South American Club Championships; 7 Brazilian Championships
- Website: sirio.org.br
Home	Away

Esporte Clube Sírio, abbreviated as E.C. Sírio, is a Brazilian sports club based in São Paulo, Brazil. It is most known for its men's basketball team, which was a dominant force in Brazilian basketball in the 1960s, 1970s and 1980s. Sírio has won seven Brazilian Championships, and eight continental South American Championships (second most behind Franca).

== History ==
The club was founded on 14 July 1917 by Syrian and Lebanese immigrants at the birthday party of Milhem Simão Racy.

Over the years, E.C. Sírio featured basketball players like: Amaury Pasos, Carlos "Mosquito" Domingos Massoni, Washington "Dodi" Joseph, Antônio Sucar, Bira Maciel, Marquinhos Leite, Julio Garavello, Marcel de Souza, Oscar Schmidt, Russo, and other talents. The club won the regional São Paulo State Championship seven times. They also won the Brazilian Championship national title seven times.

E.C. Sírio also won the continental South American Club Championship eight times. In addition to that, the club also won the title of the 1979 edition of the FIBA Intercontinental Cup.

== Honors and titles ==
=== Worldwide ===
- FIBA Intercontinental Cup
  - Champions (1): 1979
  - Runners-up (2): 1973, 1981

=== Continental ===
- South American Club Championship
  - Champions (8 - record): 1961, 1968, 1970, 1971, 1972, 1978, 1979, 1984
  - Runners-up (1): 1980

=== National ===
- Brazilian Championship
  - Champions (7): 1968, 1970, 1972, 1978, 1979, 1983, 1989
  - Runners-up (4): 1969, 1971, 1981 (II), 1987

=== Regional ===
- São Paulo State Championship
  - Champions (7): 1959, 1962, 1967, 1970, 1971, 1978, 1979
  - Runners-up (8): 1961, 1963, 1968, 1969, 1977, 1983, 1986, 1988

== Notable players ==
Note: Flags indicate national team eligibility at FIBA-sanctioned events. Players may hold other non-FIBA nationalities not displayed.

Criteria

To appear in this section a player must have either:

- Set a club record or won an individual award while at the club
- Played at least one official international match for their national team at any time
- Played at least one official NBA match at any time.

- (Brazil) Eduardo Agra
- (Brazil) Friedrich Wilhelm Braun
- (Brazil) Wagner da Silva
- (Brazil) Marcel de Souza
- (Brazil) Maury de Souza
- (Brazil) Carlos Domingos Massoni
- (Brazil) Rolando Ferreira
- (Brazil) Julio Garavello
- (Brazil) Zé Geraldo
- (Brazil) Jorge Guerra
- (Brazil) Nilo Guimarães
- (Brazil) Ricardo Guimarães
- (Brazil) Washington Joseph
- (Brazil) Marquinhos Leite
- (Brazil) Bira Maciel
- (Brazil) Sílvio Malvezi
- (Brazil) Luiz Cláudio Menon
- (Brazil) Amaury Pasos
- (Brazil) Hélio Rubens
- (Brazil) José Carlos Saiani
- (Brazil) Oscar Schmidt
- (Brazil) Milton Setrini
- (Brazil) Antônio Salvador Sucar
- (Brazil) Gerson Victalino
- (Brazil) Marcelo Vido
- (Brazil) Paulinho Villas Boas
- (Dominican Republic) Tito Horford
- (Mexico) Arturo Guerrero
- (United States) Winford Boynes
- (United States) Ray Townsend

== Head coaches ==
- (Brazil) Cláudio Mortari

== Other sports ==
Esporte Clube Sírio's football department was disbanded in 1935.

=== Football honours ===
- Campeonato Paulista Série A2
  - Winner (4): 1920, 1936, 1938, 1939
