= Seifu Retta =

Ethiopian boxer (born 1954)

Personal information
- Nationality: Ethiopian
- Born: 29 December 1954 (age 70)

Sport
- Sport: Boxing

Seifu Retta (born 29 December 1954) is an Ethiopian boxer. He competed in the men's light middleweight event at the 1980 Summer Olympics. At the 1980 Summer Olympics, he lost to George Kabuto of Uganda.
