= Boxing at the 1979 Pan American Games =

- Boxing pictogram for the games
- Venue: Trujillo Alto Coliseum, Roberto Clemente Coliseum
- Dates: July 2–14, 1979
- Competitors: 114 from 19 nations

Boxing competitions at the 1979 Pan American Games in San Juan were held from July 2 to 14 at the Trujillo Alto Coliseum and the Roberto Clemente Coliseum.

== Competition schedule ==
The following was the schedule for the boxing competitions:

P	Preliminaries	¼	Quarterfinals	½	Semifinals	F	Final

Event↓/Date →	Mon 2	Tue 3	Wed 4	Thu 5	Fri 6	Sat 7	Sun 8	Mon 9	Tue 10	Wed 11	Thu 12	Fri 13	Sat 14
Men's light flyweight				P			¼			½			F
Men's flyweight			P			¼				½			F
Men's bantamweight					P				¼		½		F
Men's featherweight	P				¼					½			F
Men's lightweight				P			¼			½			F
Men's light welterweight		P						¼			½		F
Men's welterweight			P					¼		½			F
Men's light middleweight						¼					½		F
Men's middleweight									¼		½		F
Men's light heavyweight											½		F
Men's heavyweight											½		F

== Medal table ==
* Host nation (Puerto Rico)

Rank	Nation	Gold	Silver	Bronze	Total
1	Cuba	5	0	2	7
2	United States	4	2	2	8
3	Puerto Rico*	2	4	1	7
4	Dominican Republic	0	1	4	5
5	Argentina	0	1	2	3
5	Venezuela	0	1	2	3
7	Brazil	0	1	1	2
8	Jamaica	0	1	0	1
9	Canada	0	0	2	2
9	Mexico	0	0	2	2
11	Chile	0	0	1	1
11	Colombia	0	0	1	1
11	Ecuador	0	0	1	1
11	Guyana	0	0	1	1
Totals (14 entries)		11	11	22	44

== Medalists ==
Event	Gold	Silver	Bronze
Light flyweight	Héctor Ramírez; Cuba	Richard Sandoval; United States	Eduardo Burgos; Chile
Light flyweight	Héctor Ramírez; Cuba	Richard Sandoval; United States	Gilberto Sosa; Mexico
Flyweight	Alberto Mercado; Puerto Rico	Pedro Nolasco; Dominican Republic	Ian Clyde; Canada
Flyweight	Alberto Mercado; Puerto Rico	Pedro Nolasco; Dominican Republic	Jerome Coffee; United States
Bantamweight	Jackie Beard; United States	Luis Pizarro; Puerto Rico	Héctor Lazaro; Cuba
Bantamweight	Jackie Beard; United States	Luis Pizarro; Puerto Rico	Santiago Caballero; Venezuela
Featherweight	Bernard Taylor; United States	Naudy Piñero; Venezuela	Fernando Sosa; Argentina
Featherweight	Bernard Taylor; United States	Naudy Piñero; Venezuela	Felipe Orozco; Colombia
Lightweight	Adolfo Horta; Cuba	Roberto Andino; Puerto Rico	Rafael Rodriguez; Dominican Republic
Lightweight	Adolfo Horta; Cuba	Roberto Andino; Puerto Rico	Guillermo Fernández; Venezuela
Light welterweight	Lemuel Steeples; United States	Hugo Hernández; Argentina	José Aguilar; Cuba
Light welterweight	Lemuel Steeples; United States	Hugo Hernández; Argentina	Pedro Cruz; Puerto Rico
Welterweight	Andrés Aldama; Cuba	Mike McCallum; Jamaica	José Baret; Dominican Republic
Welterweight	Andrés Aldama; Cuba	Mike McCallum; Jamaica	Javier Colin; Mexico
Light middleweight	José Angel Molina; Puerto Rico	James Shuler; United States	Francisco de Jesus; Brazil
Light middleweight	José Angel Molina; Puerto Rico	James Shuler; United States	Jorge Amparo; Dominican Republic
Middleweight	José Gómez Mustelier; Cuba	Carlos Fonseca; Brazil	Alfred Thomas; Guyana
Middleweight	José Gómez Mustelier; Cuba	Carlos Fonseca; Brazil	Oscar Florentín; Argentina
Light heavyweight	Tony Tucker; United States	Dennis Jackson; Puerto Rico	Patrick Fennel; Canada
Light heavyweight	Tony Tucker; United States	Dennis Jackson; Puerto Rico	Clemente Ortiz; Dominican Republic
Heavyweight	Teófilo Stevenson; Cuba	Narciso Maldonado; Puerto Rico	Rufus Hadley; United States
Heavyweight	Teófilo Stevenson; Cuba	Narciso Maldonado; Puerto Rico	Luis Castillo; Ecuador

== Participating nations ==
A total of 24 countries have qualified athletes.

- Argentina (6 athletes)
- Barbados (2)
- Bahamas (4)
- Belize (3)
- Brazil (10)
- Canada (8)
- Chile (5)
- Colombia (5)
- Cuba (11)
- Dominican Republic (9)
- Ecuador (4)
- El Salvador (4)
- Guyana (5)
- Jamaica (2)
- Mexico (7)
- Puerto Rico (11)
- United States (11)
- Venezuela (5)
- Virgin Islands (2)

== See also ==
- Boxing at the 1980 Summer Olympics
