= Washington Joseph =

Brazilian basketball player (born 1950)

Personal information
- Born: 5 June 1950 (age 76) São Paulo, Brazil
- Listed height: 6 ft 4 in (1.93 m)
- Listed weight: 200 lb (91 kg)
- Position: Small forward

Career highlights
- FIBA Intercontinental Cup champion (1979); 5× Brazilian champion (1968, 1970, 1972, 1978, 1979)

Washington "Dodi" Joseph, also commonly known as Dodi Joseph (born 5 June 1950), is a Brazilian former professional basketball player.

== Career ==
During his pro club career, Joseph won the 1979 edition of the FIBA Intercontinental Cup, while a member of EC Sírio.

With the senior Brazilian national basketball team, Joseph competed at the 1972 Summer Olympics, and the 1974 FIBA World Cup.
