= Boaro =

Boaro is an Italian surname. Notable people with the surname include:

- Édson Boaro (born 1959), Brazilian footballer
- Manuele Boaro (born 1987), Italian cyclist
