= Ján Franek =

Czechoslovak boxer

Personal information
- Born: 14 April 1960 (age 66) Žilina, Czechoslovakia

Sport
- Sport: Boxing
Medal record
Men's amateur boxing
Representing Czechoslovakia
Summer Olympics
Bronze medal – third place	1980 Moscow	Light Middleweight
Friendship Games
Bronze medal – third place	1984 Havana	Middleweight

Ján Franek (born 14 April 1960 in Žilina) is a retired boxer, who represented Czechoslovakia at the 1980 Summer Olympics in Moscow, Soviet Union. There he won the bronze medal in the light middleweight division (– 71 kg), after being defeated in the semifinals by eventual gold medalist Armando Martínez. He is the father of 2009 Miss Slovakia Barbora Franeková. He was homeless after being in jail for 14 months. Then he went through couple of rehabs and now he's living in Žilina city. He played the character Franek in the 2015 film Goat.

== Olympic results ==
- Defeated Benedetto Gravina (Italy) KO 2
- Defeated Zhelio Stefanov (Bulgaria) DQ 3
- Defeated Wilson Kaoma (Zambia) KO 2
- Lost to Armando Martínez (Cuba) RSC 2
