= Adetunji =

Adetunji is both a given name and a surname. Notable people with the name include:

- Adetunji Adeshina (born 2004), Nigerian footballer
- Adeoye Adetunji (born 1957), Nigerian boxer
- Saliu Adetunji (1928–2022), Nigerian monarch
- Sunday Adetunji (born 1997), Nigerian footballer
- Victor Adetunji Haffner (1919–2015), Nigerian communications engineer
