= Salah Jassim Beden =

Iranian boxer

Personal information
- Nationality: Iraqi
- Born: 3 July 1956 (age 68)

Sport
- Sport: Boxing

Salah Jassim Beden (born 3 July 1956) is an Iraqi boxer. He competed in the men's light middleweight event at the 1980 Summer Olympics.
