= Benedetto Gravina =

Italian boxer

Personal information
- Nationality: Italian
- Born: 5 September 1956 (age 68); Bari, Italy

Sport
- Sport: Boxing

Benedetto Gravina (born 5 September 1956) is an Italian boxer. He competed in the men's light middleweight event at the 1980 Summer Olympics. At the 1980 Summer Olympics, he lost to Ján Franek of Czechoslovakia.
