= Pietro Generali (basketball) =

Italian basketball player (born 1958)

Personal information
- Born: 19 October 1958 (age 68) Bologna, Italy
Medals
Men's Basketball
Representing Italy
Summer Olympic Games
| Silver medal – second place | 1980 Moscow |

Pietro Generali (born October 19, 1958 in Bologna) is a former professional basketball player from Italy.

== National team career ==
As a member of the senior men's Italian national basketball team, Generali won the silver medal at the 1980 Moscow Summer Olympic Games.
