= Football at the 1979 Pan American Games =

Football – Men's tournament at the 1979 Pan American Games
- Venues: Estadio Country Club; Estadio Sixto Escobar; Hiram Bithorn Stadium
- Dates: 2–14 July

Medalists
Gold medal	Brazil
Silver medal	Cuba
Bronze medal	Argentina

The eighth edition of the Men's Football Tournament at the Pan American Games was held in San Juan, Puerto Rico, from 2 July to 14 July 1979. Nine teams competed in a first round-robin competition, with Brazil defending the title. After the preliminary round there was a second round, followed by a knock-out stage.

Games were played at Estadio Country Club, Estadio Sixto Escobar and Estadio Hiram Bithorn. Brazil won their third gold medal after beating Cuba in the final.

== Participants ==
- Argentina
- Bermuda
- Brazil
- Costa Rica
- Cuba
- Dominican Republic
- Guatemala
- Puerto Rico
- United States

== Preliminary round ==
=== Group A ===
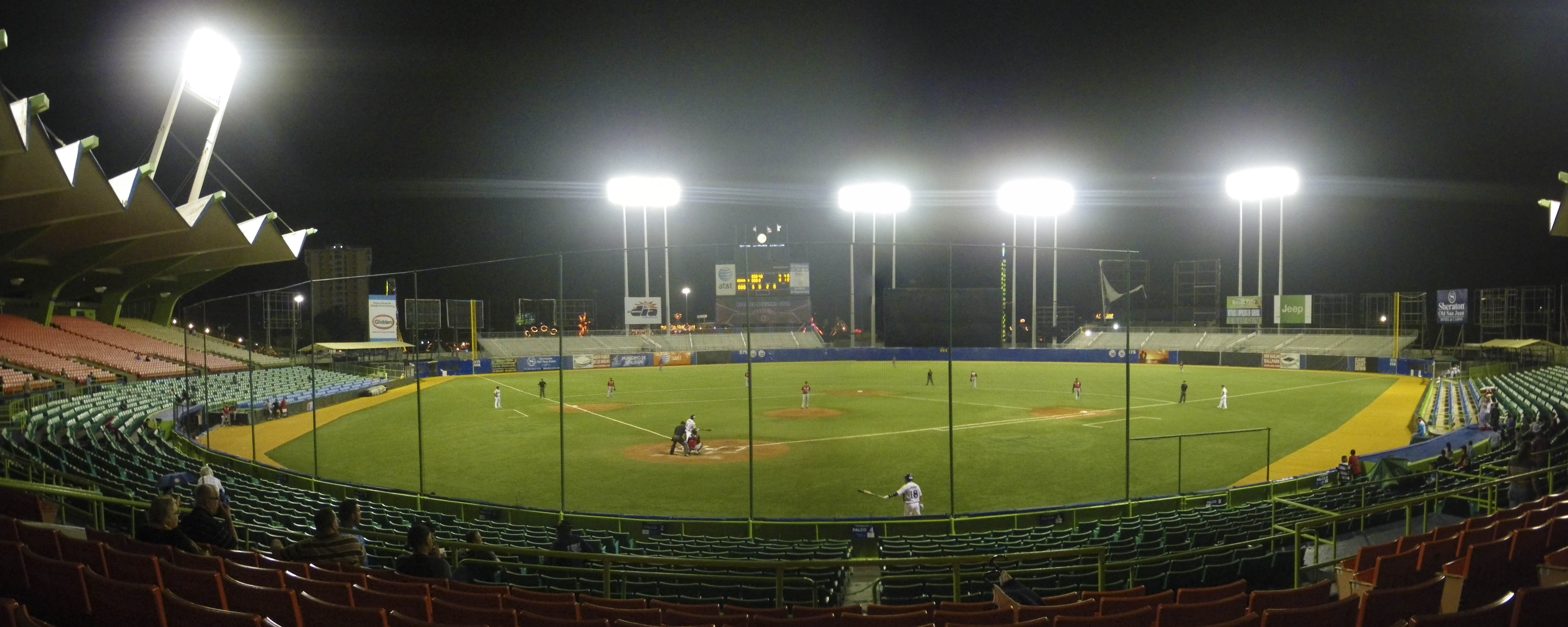
Hiram Bithorn Stadium, one of the three venues

Rank	Team	Pts	Pld	W	D	L	GF	GA
1	Argentina	4	2	2	0	0	3	0
2	Costa Rica	2	2	1	0	1	3	2
3	Bermuda	0	2	0	0	2	1	5

July 2

Argentina	2–0	Bermuda
Sosa 12', 20' (pen.)

Estadio Sixto Escobar, San Juan
Referee: Marco Gracia (USA)
July 4

Costa Rica	3–1	Bermuda
C. Solano 3'; Rojas 55', 97'		Riley 66'

Estadio Sixto Escobar, San Juan
Referee: Gastón Castro (CHI)
July 6

Argentina	1–0	Costa Rica
Fredes 40'

Hiram Bithorn Stadium, San Juan
Referee: José Roberto Wright (BRA)

=== Group B ===
Rank	Team	Pts	Pld	W	D	L	GF	GA
1	Brazil	4	2	2	0	0	3	0
2	Cuba	1	2	0	1	1	2	3
3	Guatemala	1	2	0	1	1	2	4

July 2

Brazil	2–0	Guatemala
Silva 14'; Mica 71'

Estadio Sixto Escobar, San Juan
Referee: Dino Soupliotis (CAN)
July 4

Cuba	2–2	Guatemala
Roldán 47'; Pereira 81'		Paniagua 8'; Escobar 87' (pen.)

Hiram Bithorn Stadium, San Juan
Referee: Carlos Espósito (ARG)
July 6

Brazil	1–0	Cuba
Cristóvão 69'

Estadio Sixto Escobar, San Juan
Referee: Carlos Espósito (ARG)

=== Group C ===
Rank	Team	Pts	Pld	W	D	L	GF	GA
1	United States	4	2	2	0	0	9	1
2	Puerto Rico	2	2	1	0	1	2	3
3	Dominican Republic	0	2	0	0	2	0	7

July 2

United States	6–0	Dominican Republic
Ebert 8', 29', 49', 60'; Van der Beck 75', 78'

Estadio Sixto Escobar, San Juan
Referee: Ernest Towsent (BER)
July 4

Puerto Rico	1–0	Dominican Republic
Sánchez

Estadio Country Club, San Juan
Referee: Dino Soupliotis (CAN)
July 6

United States	3–1	Puerto Rico
Hayne; Stamatis; Morrone		Correa

Estadio Sixto Escobar, San Juan
Referee: Ernest Towsent (BER)

== Second round ==
=== Group A ===
Rank	Team	Pts	Pld	W	D	L	GF	GA
1	Brazil	4	2	2	0	0	8	1
2	Costa Rica	2	2	1	0	1	5	3
3	Puerto Rico	0	2	0	0	2	0	9

July 8

Brazil	3–1	Costa Rica
Silvinho 35'; Edson Boaro 40'; Jérson 44'		Rojas 48' (pen.)

Estadio Country Club, San Juan
Referee: Ernest Towsent (BER)
July 10

Brazil	5–0	Puerto Rico
Silva 5', 60'; Mica 21'; Cléo 40'; Jérson 65'

Estadio Country Club, San Juan
Referee: Gastón Castro (CHI)
July 12

Costa Rica	4–0	Puerto Rico
Ulate 30'; L. Solano 44'; Camacho 56'; Quesada 57'

Hiram Bithorn Stadium, San Juan
Referee: Carlos Espósito (ARG)

=== Group B ===
Rank	Team	Pts	Pld	W	D	L	GF	GA
1	Cuba	3	2	1	1	0	5	0
2	Argentina	3	2	1	1	0	4	0
3	United States	0	2	0	0	2	0	9

July 8

Cuba	0–0	Argentina

Hiram Bithorn Stadium, San Juan
Referee: José Montane (PUR)
July 10

Argentina	4–0	United States
Bocanelli 17', 28'; Sosa 36'; Veloso 48'

Estadio Country Club, San Juan
Referee: José Roberto Wright (BRA)
July 12

Cuba	5–0	United States
Delgado 20'; Pereira 60', 85', 90+'; Maya 75'

Estadio Country Club, San Juan
Referee: Carlos Álvarez (COL)

== Fifth-place match ==
Puerto Rico	w/o (Note: The match was scratched and Puerto Rico awarded fifth place as the US team had flown home after the group stage.)	United States
	Report

== Bronze medal match ==
July 14

Argentina	2–0	Costa Rica
Mastrosimone 40'; Bastos 59' (o.g.)	Report

Estadio Sixto Escobar, San Juan
Referee: Dino Soupliotis (CAN)

== Gold Medal match ==
July 14

Brazil	3–0	Cuba
Wagner Basílio 3'; Silva 38'; Gilcimar 80'	Report

Estadio Sixto Escobar, San Juan
Referee: Gastón Castro (CHI)

== Awards ==
1979 Pan American Games winners

Brazil
Third title

== Medalists ==
Event	Gold	Silver	Bronze
Men's tournament	Brazil 1 – Solitinho; 2 – Luís Cláudio; 3 – Wagner Basílio; 4 – Valdoir; 5 – Vítor; 6 – João Luiz; 7 – Mica; 8 – Cléo; 9 – Silva; 10 – Jackson; 11 – Silvinho; 12 – Luís Henrique; 13 – Oswaldo; 14 – Édson Boaro; 15 – Gilcimar; 16 – Rogério; 17 – Cristovão; 18 – Jérson (HC – Mário Travaglini)	Cuba 1 – José Francisco Reinoso; 2 – Francisco López Ríos; 3 – Raimundo Frometa; 4 – Luis Sánchez; 7 – Andrés Roldán; 8 – Amado Povea; 9 – Dagoberto Lara; 10 – Ramón Núñez; 11 – Jorge Maya; 12 – Luis Dreke; 13 – Pedro Fenton; 14 – Regino Delgado; 15 – Jorge Massó; 17 – Carlos Loredo; 18 – Guillermo Mestre; 19 – Roberto Pereira; 20 – Hugo Madera; 21 – Calixto Martínez (HC – Roberto Hernández)	Argentina 1 – Oscar Rogélio Quiroga; 2 – José Omar Beccerica; 3 – Victorio Ocaño; 4 – Lucio Del Mul; 5 – Juan Cabrera; 6 – Víctor Binello; 7 – Héctor Boccanelli; 8 – Eusebio Roldán; 9 – Víctor Sosa; 10 – Salvador Mastrosimone; 11 – Antonio Alderete; 12 – Guillermo Bosio; 13 – Enrique Veloso; 14 – Luis Rolfo; 15 – Roberto Gasparini; 16 – Marcelo Fredes; 17 – Luis Amuchástegui; 18 – Osvaldo Coloccini (HC – Roberto Saporiti)

== Goalscorers ==
There were 51 goals scored in 17 matches, for an average of 3 goals per match.

4 goals

- (Brazil) Silva
- (Cuba) Roberto Pereira
- (United States) Donald Ebert

3 goals

- (Argentina) Víctor Sosa
- (Costa Rica) José Manuel Rojas

2 goals

- (Argentina) Héctor Bocanelli
- (Brazil) Jérson
- (Brazil) Mica
- (United States) Perry Van der Beck

1 goal

- (Argentina) Marcelo Fredes
- (Argentina) Salvador Mastrosimone
- (Argentina) Enrique Veloso
- (Bermuda) Stephan Riley
- (Brazil) Cléo
- (Brazil) Cristóvão
- (Brazil) Edson Boaro
- (Brazil) Gilcimar
- (Brazil) Silvinho
- (Brazil) Wagner Basílio
- (Costa Rica) Rafael Camacho
- (Costa Rica) Herberth Quesada
- (Costa Rica) Carlos Solano
- (Costa Rica) Luís Geraldo Solano
- (Costa Rica) Jorge Ulate
- (Cuba) Regino Delgado
- (Cuba) Jorge Maya
- (Cuba) Andrés Roldán
- (Guatemala) Jorge Escobar
- (Guatemala) Adán Paniagua
- (Puerto Rico) Luis Alberto Correa
- (Puerto Rico) Mayo Sánchez
- (United States) John Hayne
- (United States) Joe Morrone
- (United States) James Stamatis

1 own goal

- (Costa Rica) Nelson Bastos (for Argentina)

Source: RSSSF
