= Zhelyu Stefanov =

Bulgarian boxer

Personal information
- Nationality: Bulgarian
- Born: 29 January 1955 (age 70)

Sport
- Sport: Boxing

Zhelyu Stefanov (born 29 January 1955) is a Bulgarian boxer. He competed in the men's light middleweight event at the 1980 Summer Olympics. At the 1980 Summer Olympics, he defeated Mohamed Halibi of Lebanon, before losing to Ján Franek of Czechoslovakia.
