= Mbemba Camara =

Guinean boxer

Personal information
- Nationality: Guinean

Sport
- Sport: Boxing

Mbemba Camara is a Guinean boxer. He competed in the men's light middleweight event at the 1980 Summer Olympics. At the 1980 Summer Olympics, he lost to Francisco de Jesus of Brazil.
