= Modou Sady Diagne =

Senegalese basketball player

Modou Sady Diagne (born 5 December 1954) is a former Senegalese basketball player. Diagne competed for Senegal at the 1980 Summer Olympics, where he scored 105 points and grabbed 60 rebounds in 6 games.
