= Cléo Hickmann =

Brazilian footballer

Personal information
- Full name: Cléo Inácio Hickmann
- Date of birth: 9 February 1959 (age 67)
- Place of birth: Venâncio Aires, Brazil
- Position: Midfielder

Youth career
- –1977: Internacional

Senior career*
Years	Team	Apps	(Gls)
1977–1981	Internacional		
1980–1981	→ América-SP (loan)		
1982	Barcelona B		
1983–1985	Palmeiras	56	(13)
1983	→ Flamengo (loan)	12	(0)
1984–1985	→ America-RJ (loan)		
1986–1988	Sport Recife		
1988	Grêmio Maringá		
1989	Vila Nova		
1990	Novo Hamburgo		

International career
1979–1980	Brazil Olympic	10	(1)
Medal record
Men's Football
Representing Brazil
Pan American Games
Winner	1979 San Juan
- * Club domestic league appearances and goals as of 23 November 2023

Cléo Hickmann (born 9 February 1959), is a Brazilian former professional footballer who played as a midfielder.

== Career ==
Revealed in the youth sectors of Internacional, he played for several clubs throughout Brazil, however, due to the various injuries he suffered, he ended up not establishing himself. Made 56 appearances for Palmeiras and 12 for Flamengo.

== International career ==
Cléo was part of the Olympic team of Brazil in 1979, being champion of the San Juan Pan American Games, and of the 1980 CONMEBOL Pre-Olympic Tournament this time without repeating the success and not qualifying for Moscow.

== Personal life ==
Cléo is brother of the also footballer Amauri Hickmann, and cousin of the TV presenter and model Ana Hickmann. After retiring from football he worked as a car salesman. He is also the agent of some players.

== Honours ==
Internacional

- Copa São Paulo de Futebol Jr.: 1978

Brazil Olympic

- Pan American Games: (gold) 1979

Flamengo

- Taça Rio: 1983

Sport

- Campeonato Brasileiro: 1987
