= José Carlos Saiani =

Brazilian basketball player

Personal information
- Born: 11 April 1956 (age 70) São Paulo, Brazil
- Listed height: 6 ft 2.5 in (1.89 m)
- Listed weight: 165 lb (75 kg)

Career highlights
- FIBA Intercontinental Cup champion (1979)

José Carlos dos Santos Saiani, also commonly known as José Carlos (born 11 April 1956) is a Brazilian former professional basketball player.

== Career ==
During his pro club career, Saiani won the 1979 edition of the FIBA Intercontinental Cup, while a member of EC Sírio. With the senior Brazilian national basketball team, Saiani competed at the 1980 Summer Olympics.
