= Marcel Sîrba =

Romanian boxer

Personal information
- Nationality: Romanian
- Born: 1 October 1957 (age 67)

Sport
- Sport: Boxing

Marcel Sîrba (born 1 October 1957) is a Romanian boxer. He competed in the men's light middleweight event at the 1980 Summer Olympics. At the 1980 Summer Olympics, he lost to Leo Vainonen of Sweden.
