= Jackson Rivera (boxer) =

Venezuelan boxer

Personal information
- Full name: Jackson Ramon Rivera
- Nationality: Venezuelan
- Born: 24 August 1959 (age 65)

Sport
- Sport: Boxing

Jackson Ramon Rivera (born 24 August 1959) is a Venezuelan boxer. He competed in the men's light middleweight event at the 1980 Summer Olympics. At the 1980 Summer Olympics, he defeated Roger Houangni of Benin, before losing to Wilson Kaoma of Zambia.
