= Archery at the 1979 Pan American Games =

- Venue: Archery Range, University of Puerto Rico
- Dates: July 2–6, 1979
- Competitors: 58 from 11 nations

Archery competitions at the 1979 Pan American Games in San Juan were held from July 2 to 6 at the Archery Range in the University of Puerto Rico. Archery was included for the first time at the Pan American Games.

== Venue ==
The competitions took place at the Archery Range located on the campus of the University of Puerto Rico.

== Medal table ==
Rank	Nation	Gold	Silver	Bronze	Total
1	United States	4	2	0	6
2	Canada	0	2	2	4
3	Brazil	0	0	1	1
3	Mexico	0	0	1	1
Totals (4 entries)		4	4	4	12

== Medalists ==
Event	Gold	Silver	Bronze
Men's individual	Rodney Baston; United States	Darrell Pace; United States	Stan Siatkowski; Canada
Men's team	United States	Canada	Mexico
Women's individual	Lynette Johnson; United States	Carol Strausburg; United States	Joan McDonald; Canada
Women's team	United States	Canada	Brazil

== Participating nations ==
A total of 11 countries qualified athletes.

- Brazil (6 athletes)
- Colombia (6)
- Canada (8)
- Costa Rica (3)
- Cuba (3)
- Dominican Republic (2)
- El Salvador (3)
- Guatemala (4)
- Mexico (7)
- Puerto Rico (8)
- United States (8)

== See also ==
- Archery at the 1980 Summer Olympics
