= Marcos Leite =

Brazilian basketball player and coach (1952–2026)

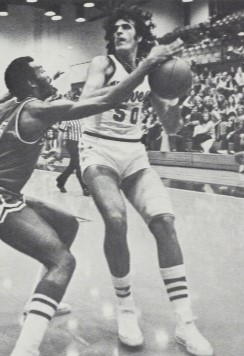
- Leite, from the 1975 Pepperdine yearbook

Personal information
- Born: 23 March 1952 Rio de Janeiro, Brazil
- Died: 22 March 2026 (aged 73)
- Listed height: 6 ft 10 in (2.08 m)
- Listed weight: 220 lb (100 kg)

Career information
- College: Pepperdine (1973–1976)
- NBA draft: 1976: 10th round, 162nd overall pick
- Drafted by: Portland Trail Blazers
- Playing career: 1967–1989
- Position: Center

Career history
- 1967–1974: Fluminense
- 1976–1978: Athletic Genova
- 1978–1980: E.C. Sírio
- 1980–1981: Virtus Bologna
- 1981–1984: E.C. Sírio
- 1984: C.R. Flamengo
- 1985: E.C. Bradesco
- 1986–1989: E.C. Sírio

Career highlights
- FIBA Intercontinental Cup champion (1979); 2× South American Club champion (1978, 1979); 3× Brazilian champion (1979, 1983, 1989); 3× São Paulo State champion (1978, 1979); 6× Rio de Janeiro State champion (1970–1974, 1984); 3× All-American Honorable Mention (1974–1976); WCAC Player of the Year (1976); 2× First-team All-WCAC (1975, 1976); Second-team All-WCAC (1974); WCAC Freshman of the Year (1974)
- Stats at Basketball Reference
Medals
Representing Brazil
Men's basketball
FIBA World Cup
| Silver medal – second place | 1970 Yugoslavia |
| Bronze medal – third place | 1978 Philippines |
FIBA AmeriCup
| Gold medal – first place | 1984 Brazil |
Pan American Games
| Gold medal – first place | 1971 Cali |
| Bronze medal – third place | 1975 Mexico City |
| Bronze medal – third place | 1979 San Juan |
| Silver medal – second place | 1983 Caracas |
FIBA South American Championship
| Gold medal – first place | 1971 Uruguay |
| Gold medal – first place | 1973 Colombia |
| Gold medal – first place | 1983 Brazil |
| Silver medal – second place | 1979 Argentina |
| Silver medal – second place | 1981 Uruguay |

Marcos Antônio Abdalla Leite (23 March 1952 – 22 March 2026), also commonly known as Marquinhos Leite, was a Brazilian professional basketball player and coach. He represented the senior Brazilian national basketball team at three Summer Olympics and four FIBA World Cup competitions. At a height of 2.08 m (6 ft 10 in) tall, he played at the center position.

== Early career ==
Leite, originally from Rio de Janeiro, began playing club basketball with the Brazilian team Fluminense (1967–1974). In addition, he played on loan at E.C. Sírio in some championships between 1971 and 1973.

== College career ==
In 1972, Leite averaged 16 points per game, at the 1972 Munich Summer Olympics. Pepperdine University's American head coach, Gary Colson, recruited Leite to the California school, based on his performance at the Olympics. Leite later went on to play college basketball at the school, where he starred with the Pepperdine Waves, from 1974 to 1976. He made an immediate impact in the West Coast Athletic Conference, earning All-WCAC Second Team honors as a freshman, and All-WCAC First Team honors as a sophomore.

As a junior, in the 1975–76 season, Leite and junior college transfer Dennis Johnson, led the Waves to a conference title, the school's second Division I NCAA Tournament appearance, and first NCAA Tournament win. The Waves beat Memphis State, in the first round, before losing to defending national champion UCLA, in the Sweet 16. Leite was named the WCAC Player of the Year, and an Honorable Mention All-American. Following the season, Leite informed Colson that he would forgo his final year of college eligibility, in order to play professionally.

During his college career, Leite scored 1,119 points (18.7 points per game), and grabbed 638 rebounds (10.6 per game). He was inducted into Pepperdine's Athletic Hall of Fame in 2013.

== Professional career ==
After college, Leite was drafted by the Portland Trail Blazers, in the 1976 NBA draft, in the 10th round, with the 162nd overall pick. However, he never played in the NBA. During his pro career, Leite played club basketball in his native Brazil, with Fluminense, E.C. Sírio, C.R. Flamengo, and E.C. Bradesco. He also played in the Italian League, with Athletic Genova and Virtus Bologna. He retired in 1989.

== National team career ==
Leite first suited up with Brazil's senior national team at the age of 18, at the 1970 FIBA World Cup. "Marquinhos" played sparingly during that tournament, as he scored 6 points in 4 games, as Brazil won the tournament's silver medal. Leite remained on the Brazilian national team, and was one of the team's top players, as they won the gold medal at the 1971 Pan American Games, a year later.

Leite averaged 16 points per game, at the 1972 Munich Summer Olympics. He also represented Brazil at the 1974 FIBA World Cup, and the 1975 Pan American Games. In later years, he was also a part of Brazil's 1978 and 1982 FIBA World Cup squads, and their 1980 and 1984 Summer Olympics teams.

== Death ==
Leite died on 22 March 2026, at the age of 73.
