= Valdoir =

Brazilian footballer

Personal information
- Full name: Valdoir Marques de Souza
- Date of birth: 3 June 1958
- Place of birth: Pelotas, Brazil
- Date of death: 30 July 2016 (aged 58)
- Place of death: Santana do Livramento, Brazil
- Position: Defender

Youth career
- 1974–1976: Grêmio Santanense
- 1976–1978: Grêmio

Senior career*
Years	Team	Apps	(Gls)
1978	Grêmio	13	(0)
1979–1980	Bahia		
1980–1981	Figueirense		
1981–1982	Coritiba		
1983	Joaçaba AC		
1984	São José-RS		
1984–1985	Brasil de Pelotas		
1986	Bagé		

International career
1979–1980	Brazil Olympic	14	(0)
Medal record
Men's Football
Representing Brazil
Pan American Games
Winner	1979 San Juan
- * Club domestic league appearances and goals as of 24 November 2023

Valdoir Marques de Souza (3 June 1958 – 30 July 2016), simply known as Valdoir, was a Brazilian professional footballer who played as a defender.

== Career ==
Valdoir played for several clubs in Brazil, especially Bahia and teams from the southern region. Versatile, Valdoir played in any position in the defensive system.

== International career ==
Valdoir was part of the Olympic team of Brazil in 1979, being champion of the San Juan Pan American Games, and of the 1980 CONMEBOL Pre-Olympic Tournament this time without repeating the success and not qualifying for Moscow.

== Honours ==
Brazil Olympic

- Pan American Games: (gold) 1979

Bahia

- Campeonato Baiano: 1979
