= Noangel Luaces =

Cuban basketball player

Personal information
- Nationality: Cuban
- Born: 30 March 1957 (age 67)

Sport
- Sport: Basketball

Noangel Luaces (born 30 March 1957) is a Cuban basketball player. He competed in the men's tournament at the 1980 Summer Olympics.
