= Zygmunt Gosiewski =

Polish boxer

Personal information
- Nationality: Polish
- Born: 11 November 1959 (age 66) Olsztyn, Poland

Sport
- Sport: Boxing
Medal record
Men's amateur boxing
Representing Poland
European Championships
Bronze medal – third place	1981 Tampere	Middleweight

Zygmunt Gosiewski (born 11 November 1959) is a Polish boxer. He competed in the men's light middleweight event at the 1980 Summer Olympics.
