= Wilson Kaoma =

Zambian boxer

Personal information
- Nationality: Zambian

Sport
- Sport: Boxing

Wilson Kaoma is a Zambian boxer. He competed in the men's light middleweight event at the 1980 Summer Olympics. At the 1980 Summer Olympics, he lost to Jackson Rivera of Venezuela.
