= Lemuel Steeples =

American boxer (1956–1980)

Personal information
- Born: May 25, 1956 St. Louis, Missouri, USA
- Died: March 14, 1980 (aged 23) Warsaw, Poland

Sport
- Sport: Boxing
- Weight class: Light welterweight
Medal record
Representing USA
Pan American Games
Gold medal – first place	1979 Caracas	Light welterweight

Lemuel Steeples (May 25, 1956 – March 14, 1980) was an American amateur boxer.

Born in St. Louis, Missouri, Steeples boxed competitively as a teenager, before taking a break from the sport during the early 1970s. He resumed in 1975, with a goal of qualifying for the following year's Montreal Olympics, but was unable to make the team. Brothers Leon and Michael Spinks, who had grown up in the same neighbourhood as Steeples, both won boxing gold medals in Montreal and this motivated him to continue boxing.

Steeples, a light welterweight, competed at the 1978 World Amateur Boxing Championships in Belgrade, where he was eliminated by East German Karl-Heinz Krüger. His breakthrough came in 1979, when he won the national Golden Gloves championship, then followed it up with a gold medal at the Pan American Games in San Juan, Puerto Rico. He was considered a strong medal–winning prospect for the 1980 Olympics in Moscow.

After the United States boycotted the 1980 Olympics, Steeples was amongst 14 boxers on the national team aboard LOT Polish Airlines Flight 007, en route to Europe for a series of exhibition matches to be held instead. The plane crashed while attempting to land in Warsaw, resulting in the deaths of all 87 passengers and crew.
