= Wagner Basílio =

Brazilian footballer (1959–2025)

Wagner Basilio

Personal information
- Date of birth: 16 November 1959
- Place of birth: São Paulo, Brazil
- Date of death: 15 July 2025 (aged 65)
- Place of death: São Paulo, Brazil
- Position: Centre-back

Youth career
- –1977: Corinthians

Senior career*
Years	Team	Apps	(Gls)
1977–1985	Corinthians	258	(5)
1986–1988	São Paulo	96	(4)
1987	→ Coritiba (loan)	3	(0)
1988	→ Sport Recife (loan)	25	(0)
1989–1992	Bahia	89	(3)

International career
1979	Brazil U23	10	(1)
Medal record
Men's Football
Representing Brazil
Pan American Games
Gold medal – first place	1979 San Juan
- * Club domestic league appearances and goals as of 27 August 2023

Wagner Basílio (16 November 1959 – 15 July 2025) was a Brazilian professional footballer who played as a centre-back.

== International career ==
Basílio was part of the squad who represented Brazil at the 1979 Pan American Games, winning gold.

== Death ==
Basílio died in São Paulo on 15 July 2025, at the age of 65.

== Honours ==
Corinthians

- Campeonato Paulista: 1979, 1982, 1983

São Paulo

- Campeonato Brasileiro: 1986
- Campeonato Paulista: 1987

Brazil U23

- 1979 Pan American Games: gold medal

== See also ==
- List of Pan American medalists for Brazil
- List of Pan American Games medalists in football
