= Félix Morales =

Cuban basketball player

Personal information
- Full name: Félix Morales Alfonso
- Nationality: Cuban
- Born: 9 June 1953 (age 71)

Sport
- Sport: Basketball

Félix Morales Alfonso (born 9 June 1953) is a Cuban basketball player. He competed in the men's tournament at the 1976 Summer Olympics and the 1980 Summer Olympics.
