= Silvinho (footballer, born 1958) =

Brazilian footballer

Personal information
- Full name: Silvio Paiva
- Date of birth: 13 November 1958 (age 67)
- Place of birth: Franca, Brazil
- Height: 1.75 m (5 ft 9 in)
- Position: Winger

Senior career*
Years	Team	Apps	(Gls)
1979–1981	América	25	(3)
1982–1986	Internacional	66	(13)
1986–1988	Sporting CP	48	(7)
1988–1990	Vitória Guimarães	59	(7)
1990–1993	Tirsense	100	(18)
1993–1994	Nacional	29	(9)
1994–1995	Paços Ferreira	30	(0)
1995–1996	Maia	31	(3)
1997	Novo Hamburgo	–	(–)

International career
1984	Brazil U23	6	(1)
Medal record
Men's football
Representing Brazil
Olympic Games
Silver medal – second place	1984 Los Angeles	Team
Pan American Games
Gold medal – first place	1979 San Juan	Team
- * Club domestic league appearances and goals

Silvio Paiva (born 13 November 1958), known as Silvinho, is a Brazilian former footballer who played as a winger. He competed in the 1984 Summer Olympics with the Brazil national under-23 football team.

== Club career ==
Silvinho debuted his professional football career in América in 1978 in Campeonato Paulista Série B1. He made his debut in Brazilian league play with América on 26 March 1978, in a 3–0 win against Flamengo. In the years 1979–1985 he was a player with SC Internacional. With Internacional, he won the Brazilian Premier League in 1979 and the Rio Grande do Sul – Campeonato Gaúcho state championship four times in 1981, 1982, 1983 and 1984.

With Internacional he debuted in the Brazilian football league system on 21 July 1985 in a win against Bangu AC, 1–2. In the 1st league from 1978 to 1985, he played in 91 matches, scoring 16 goals. In 1986 he started play in Portugal for the next ten years with: Sportingu, Vitórii Guimarães, Tirsense, CD Nacional, FC Paços de Ferreira and FC Maia. He ended his career in Brazil in Novo Hamburgo in 1997.

== International career ==
=== National team ===
In 1979, he appeared in successive matches against Guatemala, Cuba, Costa Rica (goal), Puerto Rico and a second match against Cuba at the 1979 Pan American Games, where Brazil won the gold medal.

=== 1984 Olympics ===
At the Olympics in Los Angeles with Brazil's Olympic team, Silvinho played in all six tournament matches defeating all competition to win for Brazil the silver medal: against Saudi Arabia (goal), Germany (goal), Morocco, Canada (goal), Italy. Defeated by France in the final.
