= Mohamed Halibi =

Lebanese boxer

Personal information
- Nationality: Lebanese
- Born: 1 July 1956 (age 68)

Sport
- Sport: Boxing

Mohamed Halibi (born 1 July 1956) is a Lebanese boxer. He competed at the 1980 Summer Olympics and the 1984 Summer Olympics. At the 1980 Summer Olympics, he lost to Zhelyu Stefanov of Bulgaria.
