= Lenke Jacsó-Kiss =

Hungarian basketball player (born 1951)

Personal information
- Born: 8 October 1951 (age 75) Szarvas, Hungary
- Listed height: 167 cm (5 ft 6 in)
- Listed weight: 57 kg (126 lb)

Lenke Jacsó-Kiss (born 8 October 1951) is a Hungarian basketball player. She competed in the women's tournament at the 1980 Summer Olympics.
