= Carlos Fonseca (boxer) =

Brazilian boxer (born 1955)

Personal information
- Full name: Carlos Antunes da Fonseca
- Born: October 28, 1955 (age 70)
Medal record
Men's boxing
Representing Brazil
Pan American Games
| Silver medal – second place | 1979 San Juan | Middleweight |

Carlos Antunes da Fonseca (born October 28, 1955) is a retired boxer from Brazil, who competed in the men's middleweight division (– 75 kg) during the late 1970s and early 1980s.

He represented his native country at the 1980 Summer Olympics in Moscow, alongside three other boxers: Sidnei dal Rovere, Jaime Franco and Francisco de Jesus. Fonseca captured the silver medal in the middleweight category at the 1979 Pan American Games, losing to Cuba's José Gómez Mustelier in the final.

Today he lives in Guaruja, São Paulo State. He is married to Maria Cristina and has three sons, Anderson Fonseca, Carlos Jr. and Gustavo Fonseca Antunes.
