= José Carlos de Lima =

Brazilian cyclist

Personal information
- Born: 23 February 1955 Paraná
- Died: 30 January 1988 (aged 32)

Cycling career
- Sport: Cycling

José Carlos de Lima (23 February 1955 – 30 January 1988) was a Brazilian cyclist. He competed in the individual road race and team pursuit events at the 1980 Summer Olympics.
