= Estadio Country Club =

Soccer stadium in San Juan, Puerto Rico

- Interactive map of Estadio Country Club
- Location: 1101 Calle Isaura Arnau, San Juan, Puerto Rico 00924
- Coordinates: 18.4011°N 66.0015°W
- Owner: Departamento de Recreación y Deporte
- Operator: Municipality of San Juan
- Capacity: 2,000
- Surface: Grass
- Field size: 120 yds long x 75 yds wide (109 x 68 m)

Construction
- Groundbreaking: 1970s
- Opened: 1979

Tenant
- Puerto Rico U-20 national football team

Estadio Country Club is a soccer-specific stadium located in the sector of Country Club in San Juan, Puerto Rico. It is located approximately 13 miles southeast of Old San Juan.

The 2,000 seat stadium was designed specifically for soccer, but it has also been used for four professional boxing match programs, the latest of which took place in 1975. It is home to the Puerto Rico U-20 national football team and other various youth national teams.

The stadium was built to host the soccer matches at the 1979 Pan American Games.
