= Regina Vilela =

Brazilian volleyball player (born 1951)

Personal information
- Born: Rio de Janeiro, Brazil

Sport
- Sport: Volleyball

Regina Vilela is a Brazilian volleyball player. She competed in the women's tournament at the 1980 Summer Olympics.
