= Sanja Ožegović =

Croatian basketball player

Personal information
- Born: 15 June 1959 (age 67) Zagreb, PR Croatia, FPR Yugoslavia
- Listed height: 1.73 m (5 ft 8 in)
- Listed weight: 60 kg (132 lb)
- Position: Shooting guard

Career history
- Monting Zagreb
Medals
Women's basketball
Representing Yugoslavia
Olympic Games
Bronze medal – third place	1980 Moskva	Team
EuroBasket Women
Bronze medal – third place	1980 Banja Luka	Team

Sanja Ožegović (born 15 June 1959) is a former basketball player who competed for Yugoslavia in the 1980 Summer Olympics and in the 1984 Summer Olympics.
