= Katalin Szuchy =

Hungarian basketball player

Personal information
- Nationality: Hungarian
- Born: 28 September 1953 (age 72) Budapest, Hungary

Sport
- Sport: Basketball

Katalin Szuchy (born 28 September 1953) is a Hungarian basketball player. She competed in the women's tournament at the 1980 Summer Olympics. She made 282 appearances for the national team.
