= Marcel de Souza (basketball) =

Brazilian basketball player (born 1956)

Personal information
- Born: 4 December 1956 (age 69) Campinas, Brazil
- Listed height: 6 ft 6.5 in (1.99 m)
- Listed weight: 210 lb (95 kg)
- Position: Shooting guard / small forward

Career highlights
- FIBA Intercontinental Cup champion (1979)

Marcel Ramon Ponickwar de Souza, commonly known as Marcel de Souza, or simply Marcel (born December 4, 1956, in Campinas), is a retired Brazilian professional basketball player and a professional coach.

== Professional career ==
During his pro club career, de Souza won the 1979 edition of the FIBA Intercontinental Cup, while a member of EC Sírio.

== National team career ==
De Souza played at 5 FIBA World Cups: (1974, 1978, 1982, 1986, and 1990). He totaled 37 games played and 494 points scored during those competitions, and he won a bronze medal at the 1978 tournament. De Souza also played with Brazil at the Summer Olympic Games of 1980, 1984, 1988, and 1992.

== Personal life ==
De Souza is the older brother of Maury de Souza, who is also a Brazilian former professional basketball player. De Souza is also the father-in-law of Brazilian professional basketball player Guilherme Giovannoni.
