= Leonidas Njunwa =

Tanzanian boxer (born 1952)

Personal information
- Nationality: Tanzanian
- Born: 2 August 1952 (age 72)

Sport
- Sport: Boxing

Leonidas Njunwa (born 2 August 1952) is a Tanzanian boxer. He competed in the men's light middleweight event at the 1980 Summer Olympics.
