= João Graneiro =

Brazilian volleyball player (born 1957)

Personal information
- Born: 22 February 1957 (age 68); Mato Grosso do Sul, Brazil

Sport
- Sport: Volleyball

João Graneiro (born 22 February 1957) is a Brazilian volleyball player. He competed in the men's tournament at the 1980 Summer Olympics.
