= Aleksandr Koshkin =

Soviet boxer (1959–2012)

Personal information
- Born: 13 June 1959 Izmaylovo, Moscow, Russia
- Died: 16 October 2012 (aged 53) Moscow, Russia
- Height: 179 cm (5 ft 10 in)
- Weight: 71 kg (157 lb)

Sport
- Sport: Boxing
- Club: Trudovye Rezervy
Medal record
Representing the Soviet Union
Olympic Games
Silver medal – second place	1980 Moscow	-71 kg
World Amateur Championships
Gold medal – first place	1982 Munich	-71 kg
European Amateur Championships
Gold medal – first place	1981 Tampere	-71 kg

Aleksandr Nikolayevich Koshkin (Russian: Александр Николаевич Кошкин; 13 June 1959 – 16 October 2012) was a Russian amateur light-middleweight boxer. After placing second at the 1980 Summer Olympics, he won a European title in 1981 and a world title in 1982. Koshkin typically kept a distance from the opponent and was known for his sudden knockouts.

As a child Koshkin trained in cross-country skiing, and changed to boxing at the age of 11, following his elder brother. He first trained at Spartak under Boris Grekov, who previously raised the Olympic medalist Sergei Sivko. In 1978 Koshkin was included to the Soviet national team. In the 1980 Olympic final he lost to Armando Martínez, but avenged the loss in the world championship final in 1982.

During his boxing career Koshkin fractured his hands 36 times. Hand injuries eventually forced him to retire in 1983 with a record of 180 wins out of 240 bouts. In retirement he coached boxers at Dynamo and later opened his own boxing school. He died aged 53 after suffering two strokes.
