= Antônio Silvestre =

Brazilian cyclist

Personal information
- Born: 17 April 1961 (age 65)

Cycling career
- Sport: Cycling

Antônio Silvestre (born 17 April 1961) is a Brazilian cyclist. He competed at the 1980 Summer Olympics and the 1988 Summer Olympics.
