= Ivonete das Neves =

Brazilian volleyball player (born 1960)

Personal information
- Born: 12 August 1960 (age 64); São Paulo, Brazil

Sport
- Sport: Volleyball

Ivonete das Neves (born 12 August 1960) is a Brazilian volleyball player. She competed in the women's tournament at the 1980 Summer Olympics.
