= Isabel Salgado =

Brazilian volleyball player (1960–2022)

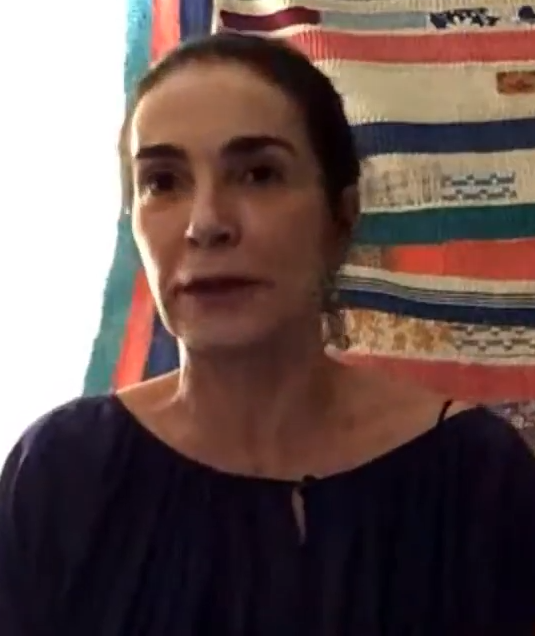

Personal information
- Full name: Maria Isabel Barroso Salgado Alencar
- Born: 2 August 1960; Rio de Janeiro, Brazil
- Died: 16 November 2022 (aged 62); São Paulo, Brazil
- Height: 1.80 m (5 ft 11 in)
- Weight: 71 kg (157 lb)

Volleyball information
- Position: Outside hitter
- Number: 7

National team
1977-1989	Brazil
Honours
Women's volleyball
Representing Brazil
Pan American Games
Bronze medal – third place	1979 San Juan	Team

Maria Isabel Barroso Salgado Alencar (2 August 1960 – 16 November 2022) was a Brazilian volleyball player and coach. She played for the Brazilian national team for ten years, with appearances at the 1980 and 1984 Summer Olympics, and the 1986 FIVB World Championship.

== Personal life ==
Salgado was mother of Pedro Solberg Salgado, Maria Clara Salgado, and Carolina Solberg Salgado, all of whom are beach volleyball players. She died from acute respiratory distress syndrome in São Paulo on 16 November 2022, at the age of 62.
