= Lenice Oliveira =

Brazilian volleyball player (born 1961)

Personal information
- Born: 24 April 1961 (age 64); São Paulo, Brazil

Sport
- Sport: Volleyball

Lenice Oliveira (born 24 April 1961) is a Brazilian volleyball player. She competed in the women's tournament at the 1980 Summer Olympics.
