= Gilcimar (footballer, born 1958) =

Brazilian footballer

Personal information
- Full name: Gilcimar Wilson Francisco
- Date of birth: 26 November 1958 (age 67)
- Place of birth: Itaguaí, Brazil
- Height: 1.70 m (5 ft 7 in)
- Position: Forward

Youth career
- –1977: Fluminense

Senior career*
Years	Team	Apps	(Gls)
1977–1982	Fluminense		
1980	→ Bahia (loan)		
1981	→ Vasco da Gama (loan)		
1983–1984	America (RJ)		
1984	Palmeiras	48	(9)
1985	Cruzeiro		
1986–1989	Inter de Limeira		
1990–1991	Toyota Motors		
1992	Itaperuna		
1992	Iracemapolense		
1993–1994	Inter de Limeira		
1995	Jataiense		
1997	Rio Claro		

International career
1979	Brazil U23	4	(1)
Medal record
Men's Football
Representing Brazil
Pan American Games
Gold medal – first place	1979 San Juan
- * Club domestic league appearances and goals as of 27 August 2023

Gilcimar Wilson Francisco (born 26 November 1958), simply known as Gilcimar, is a Brazilian former professional footballer who played as forward.

== Personal life ==
Gilcimar is brother of the also footballer Gilson Gênio (1957–2017).

== International career ==
He was part of the squad who reprensented Brazil at the 1979 Pan American Games and conquered the gold medal.

== Honours ==
=== Inter de Limeira ===
- Campeonato Paulista: 1986
- Taça dos Campeões Estaduais Rio – São Paulo: 1986

=== Brazil U23 ===
- 1979 Pan American Games: (gold) Gold medal

== See also ==
- List of Pan American medalists for Brazil
- List of Pan American Games medalists in football
