= Fernanda Silva =

Brazilian volleyball player (born 1958)

Personal information
- Full name: Fernanda Emerick da Silva Rangel
- Born: 1 September 1958 (age 68); Araraquara, Brazil
- Height: 1.80 m (5 ft 11 in)
Honours
Women's volleyball
Representing Brazil
Pan American Games
Bronze medal – third place	1979 Caguas	Team

Fernanda Silva (born 1 September 1958) is a Brazilian former volleyball player. She competed at the 1980 Summer Olympics and the 1984 Summer Olympics.
