= Édson Boaro =

Brazilian football manager and former player

Personal information
- Full name: Édson Boaro
- Date of birth: 3 July 1959 (age 67)
- Place of birth: São José do Rio Pardo, Brazil
- Height: 1.79 m (5 ft 10 in)
- Position: Right-back

Youth career
- Ponte Preta

Senior career*
Years	Team	Apps	(Gls)
1978–1983	Ponte Preta		
1984–1989	Corinthians	226	(8)
1989–1990	Palmeiras		
1991	Guarani		
1991	Noroeste		
1992–1993	Paysandu		
1993	Remo		
1994–1995	Botafogo-SP		
1996–1997	Sãocarlense		

International career
1979	Brazil U23	5	(1)
1983–1986	Brazil	19	(0)

Managerial career
- 1998: EC Lemense
- 1998: Jacareí U20
- 1999: Taubaté
- 1999: Noroeste
- 2007: CA Lemense
- 2008: Francana
- 2008–2009: São Bernardo U15
- 2009: São Bernardo (interim)
- 2009: Francana
- 2010: Mauaense
- 2011: São Bernardo (interim)
- 2012: São Bernardo (interim)
- 2013: São Bernardo (interim)
- 2013–2015: São Bernardo
- 2020: Batatais
- 2022–2025: Ponte Preta U20
- 2026: Ponte Preta (assistant)
- 2026: Ponte Preta (interim)
Medal record
Representing Brazil
Men's Football
Gold medal – first place	1979 San Juan	Team competition
- * Club domestic league appearances and goals

Édson Boaro (born 3 July 1959), sometimes known as Édson Abobrão or just Édson, is a Brazilian football coach and former player who played as a right-back.

In his career, he played for Ponte Preta, Corinthians, Palmeiras, Guarani, Noroeste, Paysandu, Remo, Botafogo-SP and Sãocarlense. He won the Brazilian Silver Ball Award in 1984, one Campeonato Paulista in 1988 and one Campeonato Paraense in 1992. With the Brazil national football team, he won at the Pan American Games in 1979, was capped 19 times between June 1983 and June 1986, and participated in the 1986 FIFA World Cup.

Édson played at right-back in Brazil’s opening two games in the 1986 World Cup in México, when first choice Leandro did not make the trip. He was injured early in the second game, against Algeria in Guadalajara, and was replaced by the veteran midfielder Falcão. However, Édson’s injury ultimately led to the début of Josimar, at right-back, for the next game against Northern Ireland. Édson never played for Brazil again. Since 1998, he is a coach.

== Honours ==
=== Player ===
Corinthans

- Campeonato Paulista: 1988

Paysandu

- Campeonato Paraense: 1992

Brazil

- Pan American Games: 1979

=== Manager ===
São Bernardo

- Copa Paulista: 2013
