= Milton Setrini =

Brazilian basketball player

Personal information
- Born: 4 January 1951 (age 75) São Paulo, Brazil
- Listed height: 6 ft 3.75 in (1.92 m)
- Listed weight: 165 lb (75 kg)
- Position: Shooting guard

Career highlights
- 2× Brazilian champion (1977, 1981)

Milton "Carioquinha" Setrini Júnior (born 4 January 1951), also commonly known as Carioquinha, is a Brazilian former professional basketball player and coach.

== Playing career ==
During his pro club career, Carioquinha won 2 Brazilian Championships, in the seasons 1977 and 1981 (I).

With the senior Brazilian national basketball team, Carioquinha competed at the following major world tournaments: the 1974 FIBA World Cup, the 1978 FIBA World Cup, the 1980 Summer Olympics, the 1982 FIBA World Cup, and the 1984 Summer Olympics.

== Coaching career ==
After his basketball playing career ended, Carioquinha began a career working as a basketball coach.
