= Rita Teixeira =

Brazilian volleyball player (born 1960)

Personal information
- Born: 22 April 1960 (age 66) Porto Ferreira, Brazil

Sport
- Sport: Volleyball

Rita Teixeira (born 22 April 1960) is a Brazilian former volleyball player. She competed in the women's tournament at the 1980 Summer Olympics. She was later elected mayor of Santa Cruz das Palmeiras.
