= Denise Mattioli =

Brazilian volleyball player (born 1952)

Personal information
- Born: 25 March 1952 (age 73); Rio de Janeiro, Brazil

Sport
- Sport: Volleyball

Denise Mattioli (born 25 March 1952) is a Brazilian volleyball player. She competed in the women's tournament at the 1980 Summer Olympics.
