= Dora Castanheira =

Brazilian volleyball player (born 1960)

Personal information
- Born: 14 March 1960 (age 66) Ponte Nova, Brazil

Sport
- Sport: Volleyball

Dora Castanheira (born 14 March 1960) is a Brazilian volleyball player. She competed at the 1980 Summer Olympics and the 1988 Summer Olympics.
