= Eliana Aleixo =

Brazilian volleyball player (born 1954)

Personal information
- Born: 13 July 1954 (age 70); Belo Horizonte, Brazil

Sport
- Sport: Volleyball

Eliana Maria Nagib Aleixo (born 13 July 1954) is a Brazilian former volleyball player. She competed in the women's tournament at the 1980 Summer Olympics.
