= Oswaldo Simões Filho =

Brazilian judoka (born 1952)

Personal information
- Born: 12 October 1952 (age 72); Recife, Brazil

Sport
- Sport: Judo

Oswaldo Simões Filho (born 12 October 1952) is a Brazilian judoka. He competed in the men's heavyweight event at the 1980 Summer Olympics.
