= George Kabuto =

Ugandan boxer

Personal information
- Nationality: Ugandan
- Born: 25 October 1955 (age 69)

Sport
- Sport: Boxing

George Kabuto (born 25 October 1955) is a Ugandan boxer. He competed in the men's light middleweight event at the 1980 Summer Olympics.
