= Manfred Kaufmann (sailor) =

Brazilian sailor

Personal information
- Born: 6 March 1953 (age 73) São Paulo, Brazil

Sport
- Sport: Sailing

Manfred Kaufmann (born 6 March 1953) is a Brazilian sailor. He competed in the Flying Dutchman event at the 1980 Summer Olympics.
