= Deraldo Wanderley =

Brazilian volleyball player (born 1956)

Personal information
- Born: 29 April 1956 (age 69); São Paulo, Brazil

Sport
- Sport: Volleyball

Deraldo Wanderley (born 29 April 1956) is a Brazilian volleyball player. He competed in the men's tournament at the 1980 Summer Olympics.
