= 1978 FIBA World Championship =

1978 edition of the FIBA World Championship

Tournament details
- Host country: Philippines
- Cities: Manila; Quezon City
- Dates: October 1–14
- Officially opened by: Ferdinand Marcos
- Teams: 14 (from 5 confederations)
- Venue(s): Rizal Memorial Coliseum; Araneta Coliseum

Final positions
- Champions: Yugoslavia (2nd title)
- Runners-up: Soviet Union
- Third place: Brazil
- Fourth place: Italy

Tournament statistics
- Games played: 59
- MVP: (Socialist Federal Republic of Yugoslavia) Dražen Dalipagić
- Top scorer: (Czechoslovakia) Kamil Brabenec (26.9 points per game)

The 1978 FIBA World Championship was the 8th FIBA World Championship, the international basketball world championship for men's national teams. The tournament was hosted by the Philippines from October 1 to 14, 1978 in Rizal Memorial Coliseum in Manila and Araneta Coliseum in Quezon City (both cities in Metro Manila).

It was the first FIBA World Championship (now called the FIBA Basketball World Cup) held in Asia.

== Host selection ==
On July 11, 1974 at the FIBA Congress held in San Juan, Puerto Rico, the Philippines was unanimously chosen as host after Argentina and Spain withdrew their bids.

== Venues ==
| Metro Manila | | Philippines | |
|---|---|---|---|
| Manila | Quezon City | 1978 FIBA World Championship is located in Philippines | Metro Manila |
| Rizal Memorial Coliseum; Capacity: 8,000 | Araneta Coliseum; Capacity: 25,000* | 1978 FIBA World Championship is located in Philippines | 1978 FIBA World Championship is located in Metro Manila |

(*) Temporarily reduced to 10,000 for the finals due to safety reasons.

== Competing nations ==
| Group A | Group B | Group C | Semifinal round |
|---|---|---|---|
| Canada; South Korea; Senegal; Yugoslavia | Brazil; China; Italy; Puerto Rico | Australia; Czechoslovakia; Dominican Republic; United States | Philippines – host Soviet Union – defending champion |

== Preliminary round ==
=== Group A ===
| Pos | Team | Pld | W | L | PF | PA | PD | Pts | Qualification |
|---|---|---|---|---|---|---|---|---|---|
| 1 | Yugoslavia | 3 | 3 | 0 | 325 | 244 | +81 | 6 | Semifinal round |
| 2 | Canada | 3 | 2 | 1 | 260 | 216 | +44 | 5 | Semifinal round |
| 3 | South Korea | 3 | 1 | 2 | 240 | 310 | −70 | 4 | Classification round |
| 4 | Senegal | 3 | 0 | 3 | 190 | 245 | −55 | 3 | Classification round |

Source: FIBA archive
Rules for classification: 1) points; 2) head-to-head points; 3) head-to-head goal average; 4) head-to-head number of points scored.

October 2

| Canada | 105–69 | South Korea |
Scoring by half: 52-42, 53-27

Araneta Coliseum, Quezon city

October 2

| Yugoslavia | 99–64 | Senegal |
Scoring by half: 50-27, 49-37

Rizal Memorial Coliseum, Manila

October 3

| South Korea | 85–121 | Yugoslavia |
Scoring by half: 44-65, 41-56

Araneta Coliseum, Quezon city

October 3

| Canada | 60–42 | Senegal |
Scoring by half: 36-17, 24-25

Rizal Memorial Coliseum, Manila

October 4

| South Korea | 86–84 (OT) | Senegal |
Scoring by half: 36-33, 38-41 Overtime: 12-10

Araneta Coliseum, Quezon city

October 4

| Yugoslavia | 105–95 | Canada |
Scoring by half: 55-47, 50-48

Rizal Memorial Coliseum, Manila

=== Group B ===
| Pos | Team | Pld | W | L | PF | PA | PD | Pts | Qualification |
|---|---|---|---|---|---|---|---|---|---|
| 1 | Brazil | 3 | 3 | 0 | 342 | 269 | +73 | 6 | Semifinal round |
| 2 | Italy | 3 | 2 | 1 | 302 | 263 | +39 | 5 | Semifinal round |
| 3 | Puerto Rico | 3 | 1 | 2 | 275 | 297 | −22 | 4 | Classification round |
| 4 | China | 3 | 0 | 3 | 296 | 386 | −90 | 3 | Classification round |

Source: FIBA archive
Rules for classification: 1) points; 2) head-to-head points; 3) head-to-head goal average; 4) head-to-head number of points scored.

October 2

| Brazil | 154–97 | China |
Scoring by half: 65-35, 89-62

Rizal Memorial Coliseum, Manila

October 2

| Puerto Rico | 80–93 | Italy |
Scoring by half: 43-44, 37-49

Rizal Memorial Coliseum, Manila

October 3

| China | 104–107 | Puerto Rico |
Scoring by half: 44-62, 60-45

Rizal Memorial Coliseum, Manila

October 3

| Italy | 84–88 | Brazil |
Scoring by half: 45-38, 39-50

Rizal Memorial Coliseum, Manila

October 4

| Puerto Rico | 88–100 | Brazil |
Scoring by half: 43-53, 45-47

Araneta Coliseum, Quezon city

October 4

| China | 95–125 | Italy |
Scoring by half: 49-60, 46-65

Rizal Memorial Coliseum, Manila

=== Group C ===
| Pos | Team | Pld | W | L | PF | PA | PD | Pts | Qualification |
|---|---|---|---|---|---|---|---|---|---|
| 1 | United States | 3 | 3 | 0 | 277 | 219 | +58 | 6 | Semifinal round |
| 2 | Australia | 3 | 2 | 1 | 220 | 217 | +3 | 5 | Semifinal round |
| 3 | Czechoslovakia | 3 | 1 | 2 | 229 | 248 | −19 | 4 | Classification round |
| 4 | Dominican Republic | 3 | 0 | 3 | 218 | 260 | −42 | 3 | Classification round |

Source: FIBA archive
Rules for classification: 1) points; 2) head-to-head points; 3) head-to-head goal average; 4) head-to-head number of points scored.

October 1

| Australia | 75–77 | United States |
Scoring by half: 37-38, 38-39

Araneta Coliseum, Quezon city

October 2

| Australia | 71–68 | Czechoslovakia |
Scoring by half: 38-32, 33-36

Araneta Coliseum, Quezon city

October 2

| Dominican Republic | 65–104 | United States |
Scoring by half: 24-49, 41-55

Araneta Coliseum, Quezon city

October 3

| Australia | 74–72 | Dominican Republic |
Scoring by half: 37-26, 37-46

Araneta Coliseum, Quezon city

October 3

| United States | 96–79 | Czechoslovakia |
Scoring by half: 46-46, 50-33

Araneta Coliseum, Quezon city

October 4

| Dominican Republic | 81–82 | Czechoslovakia |
Scoring by half: 44-44, 37-38

Araneta Coliseum, Quezon city

== Classification round ==
| Pos | Team | Pld | W | L | PF | PA | PD | Pts |
|---|---|---|---|---|---|---|---|---|
| 9 | Czechoslovakia | 5 | 5 | 0 | 533 | 444 | +89 | 10 |
| 10 | Puerto Rico | 5 | 4 | 1 | 546 | 481 | +65 | 9 |
| 11 | China | 5 | 2 | 3 | 495 | 516 | −21 | 7 (Note: Head-to-head record: China 1–0 Dominican Republic) |
| 12 | Dominican Republic | 5 | 2 | 3 | 475 | 485 | −10 | 7 |
| 13 | South Korea | 5 | 1 | 4 | 438 | 521 | −83 | 6 (Note: Head-to-head record: South Korea 1–0 Senegal) |
| 14 | Senegal | 5 | 1 | 4 | 414 | 454 | −40 | 6 |

Source: FIBA archive
Rules for classification: 1) points; 2) head-to-head points; 3) head-to-head goal average; 4) head-to-head number of points scored.
Notes:

October 6

| South Korea | 90–102 | China |
Scoring by half: 46-58, 44-44

Araneta Coliseum, Quezon city

October 6

| Senegal | 76–80 | Dominican Republic |
Scoring by half: 40-41, 36-39

Rizal Memorial Coliseum, Manila

October 8

| South Korea | 93–113 | Dominican Republic |
Scoring by half: 44-50, 49-63

Rizal Memorial Coliseum, Manila

October 9

| China | 95–118 | Czechoslovakia |
Scoring by half: 54-57, 41-61

Araneta Coliseum, Quezon city

October 9

| South Korea | 87–119 | Puerto Rico |
Scoring by half: 48-61, 39-58

Rizal Memorial Coliseum, Manila

October 7

| Puerto Rico | 104–118 | Czechoslovakia |
Scoring by half: 52-60, 52-58

Rizal Memorial Coliseum, Manila

October 11

| China | 79–89 | Senegal |
Scoring by half: 39-42, 40-47

Araneta Coliseum, Quezon city

October 11

| South Korea | 82–103 | Czechoslovakia |
Scoring by half: 42-49, 40-54

Rizal Memorial Coliseum, Manila

October 12

| Dominican Republic | 89–119 | Puerto Rico |
Scoring by half: 38-61, 51-58

Araneta Coliseum, Quezon city

October 12

| Czechoslovakia | 112–82 | Senegal |
Scoring by half: 59-46, 53-36

Rizal Memorial Coliseum, Manila

October 13

| Puerto Rico | 97–83 | Senegal |
Scoring by half: 43-43, 54-40

Araneta Coliseum, Quezon city

October 13

| Dominican Republic | 112–115 | China |
Scoring by half: 62-57, 50-58

Rizal Memorial Coliseum, Manila

== Semifinal round ==
| Pos | Team | Pld | W | L | PF | PA | PD | Pts | Qualification |
|---|---|---|---|---|---|---|---|---|---|
| 1 | Yugoslavia | 7 | 7 | 0 | 731 | 645 | +86 | 14 | Final |
| 2 | Soviet Union | 7 | 6 | 1 | 691 | 550 | +141 | 13 | Final |
| 3 | Brazil | 7 | 5 | 2 | 648 | 571 | +77 | 12 | Third place playoff |
| 4 | Italy | 7 | 4 | 3 | 609 | 582 | +27 | 11 | Third place playoff |
| 5 | United States | 7 | 3 | 4 | 612 | 605 | +7 | 10 | Fifth place playoff |
| 6 | Canada | 7 | 2 | 5 | 605 | 644 | −39 | 9 | Fifth place playoff |
| 7 | Australia | 7 | 1 | 6 | 566 | 632 | −66 | 8 | Seventh place playoff |
| 8 | Philippines (H) | 7 | 0 | 7 | 521 | 754 | −233 | 7 | Seventh place playoff |

Source: FIBA archive
Rules for classification: 1) points; 2) head-to-head points; 3) head-to-head goal average; 4) head-to-head number of points scored.
(H) Hosts

October 6

| Brazil | 69–62 | Canada |
Scoring by half: 30-34, 39-28

Araneta Coliseum, Quezon City

October 6

| United States | 80–81 | Italy |
Scoring by half: 39-47, 41-34

Araneta Coliseum, Quezon City

October 6

| Philippines | 101–117 | Yugoslavia |
Scoring by half: 45-54, 56-63

Rizal Memorial Coliseum, Manila

October 6

| Soviet Union | 112–67 | Australia |
Scoring by half: 56-35, 56-32

Rizal Memorial Coliseum, Manila

October 7

| Soviet Union | 110–63 | Philippines |
Scoring by half: 44-30, 66-33

Araneta Coliseum, Quezon City

October 7

| Italy | 76–108 | Yugoslavia |
Scoring by half: 36-53, 40-55

Araneta Coliseum, Quezon City

October 7

| Australia | 78–108 | Brazil |
Scoring by half: 27-59, 51-49

Rizal Memorial Coliseum, Manila

October 8

| Soviet Union | 107–85 | Canada |
Scoring by half: 64-36, 43-49

Araneta Coliseum, Quezon City

October 8

| Yugoslavia | 100–93 | United States |
Scoring by half: 48-41, 52-52

Araneta Coliseum, Quezon City

October 8

| Australia | 69–87 | Italy |
Scoring by half: 35-44, 34-43

Rizal Memorial Coliseum, Manila

October 9

| Philippines | 72–119 | Brazil |
Scoring by half: 34-59, 38-60

Araneta Coliseum, Quezon City

October 9

| Canada | 90–96 | United States |
Scoring by half: 50-51, 40-45

Rizal Memorial Coliseum, Manila

October 10

| United States | 90–92 | Brazil |
Scoring by half: 46-39, 44-53

Araneta Coliseum, Quezon City

October 10

| Yugoslavia | 105–92 | Soviet Union |
Scoring by half: 49-47, 56-45

Araneta Coliseum, Quezon City

October 10

| Philippines | 75–112 | Italy |
Scoring by half: 30-54, 45-58

Rizal Memorial Coliseum, Manila

October 10

| Australia | 79–91 | Canada |
Scoring by half: 28-44, 51-47

Rizal Memorial Coliseum, Manila

October 11

| Australia | 97–52 | Philippines |
Scoring by half: 48-21, 49-31

Araneta Coliseum, Quezon City

October 11

| Soviet Union | 79–69 | Italy |
Scoring by half: 46-38, 33-31

Araneta Coliseum, Quezon City

October 11

| Yugoslavia | 91–87 | Brazil |
Scoring by half: 44-46, 47-41

Rizal Memorial Coliseum, Manila

October 12

| United States | 76–97 | Soviet Union |
Scoring by half: 37-47, 39-50

Araneta Coliseum, Quezon City

October 12

| Canada | 99–88 | Philippines |
Scoring by half: 53-40, 46-48

Rizal Memorial Coliseum, Manila

October 13

| United States | 100–70 | Philippines |
Scoring by half: 50-36, 50-34

Araneta Coliseum, Quezon City

October 13

| Soviet Union | 94–85 | Brazil |
Scoring by half: 46-40, 48-45

Araneta Coliseum, Quezon City

October 13

| Italy | 100–83 | Canada |
Scoring by half: 46-47, 54-36

Rizal Memorial Coliseum, Manila

October 13

| Australia | 101–105 | Yugoslavia |
Scoring by half: 41-56, 60-49

Rizal Memorial Coliseum, Manila

== Final round ==
=== Seventh place playoff ===
October 14

| Philippines | 74–92 | Australia |
Scoring by half: 36–38, 38–54
| Pts: Cruz 14 | | Pts: Riddle 18 |

Rizal Memorial Coliseum, Manila
Referees: Artenik Arabadjan (BUL), Kruno Brumen (YUG)

=== Fifth place playoff ===
October 14

| Canada | 94–96 | United States |
Scoring by half: 50–47, 44–49
| Pts: Rautins 20 | | Pts: Kiffin 25 |

Rizal Memorial Coliseum, Manila
Referees: Paulo dos Anjos (BRA), Kim Young-han (KOR)

=== Third place playoff ===
October 14

| Brazil | 86–85 | Italy |
Scoring by half: 50–45, 36–40
| Pts: Marcel 22 | | Pts: Bariviera, Bertolotti 21 |

Araneta Coliseum, Quezon City
Attendance: 10,000
Referees: Mikhail Dovidov (USSR), Hugh Richardson (USA)

=== Final ===
October 14

| Yugoslavia | 82–81 (OT) | Soviet Union |
Scoring by half: 41–41, 32–32 Overtime: 9–8
| Pts: Dalipagić 21 | | Pts: Tkachenko 14 |

Araneta Coliseum, Quezon City
Attendance: 10,000
Referees: Ron Omori (USA), Don Cline (CAN)

== Final standings ==
| Rank | Team | Record |
|---|---|---|
| 1 | Yugoslavia | 10–0 |
| 2 | Soviet Union | 6–2 |
| 3 | Brazil | 8–2 |
| 4 | Italy | 6–4 |
| 5 | United States | 6–4 |
| 6 | Canada | 4–6 |
| 7 | Australia | 4–6 |
| 8 | Philippines | 0–8 |
| 9 | Czechoslovakia | 5–2 |
| 10 | Puerto Rico | 4–3 |
| 11 | China | 2–5 |
| 12 | Dominican Republic | 2–5 |
| 13 | South Korea | 1–6 |
| 14 | Senegal | 1–6 |

== Awards ==
1978 FIBA World Championship winner

Yugoslavia
2nd title

Most Valuable Player
(Socialist Federal Republic of Yugoslavia) Dražen Dalipagić

=== All-Tournament Team ===
- (Socialist Federal Republic of Yugoslavia) Krešimir Ćosić
- (Socialist Federal Republic of Yugoslavia) Dražen Dalipagić
- (Socialist Federal Republic of Yugoslavia) Dragan Kićanović
- (Brazil) Oscar Schmidt
- (Soviet Union) Vladimir Tkachenko

== Top scorers (ppg) ==
1. Kamil Brabenec (Czechoslovakia) 26.9
2. Zhang Weiping (People's Republic of China) 25.1
3. Choi Bu-Young (Korea) 21.1
4. Dražen Dalipagić (Yugoslavia) 20
5. Oscar Schmidt (Brazil) 19.0
6. Leo Rautins (Canada) 17.9
7. Marcel De Souza (Brazil) 17.7
8. Dragan Kićanović (Yugoslavia) 16.5
9. Renzo Bariviera (Italy) 16.2
10. Marcos Antonio Leite "Marquinhos" (Brazil) 14.7
