= Leo Vainonen =

Swedish boxer

Personal information
- Nationality: Swedish
- Born: 26 June 1952 (age 72); Gävle, Sweden

Sport
- Sport: Boxing

Leo Vainonen (born 26 June 1952) is a Swedish boxer. He competed at the 1976 Summer Olympics and the 1980 Summer Olympics. Vainonen is of Ingrian Finnish descent through his parents who had moved to Sweden from Ingria, Soviet Union, due to World War II.
