= Adeoye Adetunji =

Nigerian boxer

Personal information
- Nationality: Nigerian
- Born: 28 November 1957 (age 68)
- Height: 1.74 m (5 ft 9 in)
- Weight: 71 kg (157 lb)

Sport
- Sport: Boxing

Adeoye Adetunji(born 28 November 1957) is a Nigerian boxer. He competed in the 1980 Summer Olympics.
