= 1979 FIBA Intercontinental Cup =

- League: FIBA Intercontinental Cup
- Sport: Basketball
- Finals champions: (Brazil) Sírio
- Runners-up: (Socialist Federal Republic of Yugoslavia) Bosna

FIBA Intercontinental Cup seasons
- ← 1978 FIBA Intercontinental Cup 1980 FIBA Intercontinental Cup →

The 1979 FIBA Intercontinental Cup William Jones was the 13th edition of the FIBA Intercontinental Cup for men's basketball clubs. It took place at Ginásio do Ibirapuera, São Paulo, Brazil.

== Participants ==
Continent	Teams	Clubs	
Europe	2	(Socialist Federal Republic of Yugoslavia) Bosna	(Italy) Emerson Varese
North America	2	(Puerto Rico) Piratas de Quebradillas	(United States) Mo-Kan All-Stars
South America	1	(Brazil) Sírio	

== League stage ==
Day 1, October 2 1979

Team 1	Score	Team 2
Mo-Kan All-Stars (United States)	111–114	(Socialist Federal Republic of Yugoslavia) Bosna
Sírio (Brazil)	114–81	(Puerto Rico) Piratas de Quebradillas

Day 2, October 3 1979

Team 1	Score	Team 2
Emerson Varese (Italy)	78–73	(Puerto Rico) Piratas de Quebradillas
Sírio (Brazil)	91–98	(United States) Mo-Kan All-Stars

Day 3, October 4 1979

Team 1	Score	Team 2
Mo-Kan All-Stars (United States)	95–96	(Puerto Rico) Piratas de Quebradillas
Bosna (Socialist Federal Republic of Yugoslavia)	109–90	(Italy) Emerson Varese

Day 4, October 5 1979

Team 1	Score	Team 2
Piratas de Quebradillas (Puerto Rico)	83–84	(Socialist Federal Republic of Yugoslavia) Bosna
Sírio (Brazil)	83–79	(Italy) Emerson Varese

Day 5, October 6 1979

Team 1	Score	Team 2
Emerson Varese (Italy)	80–75	(United States) Mo-Kan All-Stars
Sírio (Brazil)	100–98	(Socialist Federal Republic of Yugoslavia) Bosna

== Final standings ==
	Team	Pld	Pts	W	L	PF	PA
1.	(Brazil) Sírio	4	7	3	1	388	356
2.	(Socialist Federal Republic of Yugoslavia) Bosna	4	7	3	1	405	384
3.	(Italy) Emerson Varese	4	6	2	2	327	340
4.	(Puerto Rico) Piratas de Quebradillas	4	5	1	3	333	371
5.	(United States) Mo-Kan All-Stars	4	5	1	3	379	381

1979 Intercontinental Champions

Sírio
1st title
