= Francisco de Jesus =

Brazilian boxer (born 1956)

Personal information
- Born: May 9, 1956 (age 70) São Paulo, Brazil
Medal record
Men's boxing
Representing Brazil
Pan American Games
Bronze medal – third place	1979 San Juan	Light Middleweight

Francisco de Jesus (born May 9, 1956) is a Brazilian former professional boxer who competed from 1980 to 1994, challenging for the WBA super welterweight title in 1989. As an amateur, he competed at two consecutive Summer Olympics in 1976 and 1980. He also captured the bronze medal in the light-middleweight category at the 1979 Pan American Games.
