= Brazil Olympic football team results (1952–1988) =

This page details the match results and statistics of the Brazil olympic football team during the professionalism restriction era.

Win Draw Loss

== 1950 ==
16 July 1952 1952 Olympics	Brazil	5–1	Netherlands	Turku, Finland
19:00	Humberto Tozzi 25'; Larry 33' (pen.), 36'; Jansen 81'; Vavá 86'	Report	Van Roessel 15'	Stadium: Kupittaa; Attendance: 9.685; Referee: Giorgio Bernardi (ITA)

20 July 1952 1952 Olympics	Brazil	2–1	Luxembourg	Kotka, Finland
19:00	Larry 42'; Humberto Tozzi 49'	Report	Gales 86'	Stadium: Kotkan Urheilukeskus; Attendance: 6.776; Referee: Marijan Matancic (YUG)

20 July 1952 1952 Olympics	Germany	4–2 (a.e.t.)	Brazil	Helsinki, Finland
19:00	Schröder 75', 96'; Klug 89'; Zeitler 120'	Report	Larry 12'; Zózimo 74'	Stadium: Olympic Stadium; Attendance: 11.451; Referee: Arthur Ellis (GBR)

11 August 1959 Unofficial friendly	Brazil	4–1	Brazil Military Team	Rio de Janeiro, Brazil
	China; Gérson; Germano; Manuel		Bataglia	Stadium: Estádio das Laranjeiras; Referee: Alberto da Gama (BRA)

14 August 1959 Unofficial friendly	Brazil	1–2	Brazil Military Team	Rio de Janeiro, Brazil
	Roberto Rodrigues		Válter; Bataglia	Stadium: Estádio das Laranjeiras; Referee: Alberto da Gama (BRA)

29 August 1959 1959 Pan American Games	Brazil	4–2	Costa Rica	Chicago, United States
	Beyruth 25'; China 33', 78'; Roberto Rodrigues 80'		Vargas 68'; Loria 70'	Stadium: Soldier Field; Referee: Leo Goldstein (USA)

30 August 1959 1959 Pan American Games	Brazil	4–0	Cuba	Chicago, United States
	Gérson 2' (pen.), 4'; Roberto Rodrigues 55'; Beyruth			Stadium: Soldier Field; Referee: Nils Dahlquist (USA)

31 August 1959 1959 Pan American Games	United States	5–3	Brazil	Macomb, United States
	Murphy 4', 49', 64'; Zerhusen 44', 78'		Gérson 16'; Roberto Rodrigues 19'; Germano 62'	Stadium: Hanson Field; Referee: Raymond Morgan (CAN)

2 September 1959 1959 Pan American Games	Brazil	9–1	Haiti	Chicago, United States
	Germano 2', 52', 65'; China 18', 44', 54', 63'; Roberto Rodrigues 57'; Maranhão 69'		Delpeche 77'	Stadium: Soldier Field; Referee: Nils Dahlquist (USA)

3 September 1959 1959 Pan American Games	Brazil	6–2	Mexico	Chicago, United States
	China 20', 40', 70'; Gérson 48', 52', 86'		Mercado 65' (pen.); Carranza 79'	Stadium: Soldier Field; Referee: John Best (USA)

5 September 1959 1959 Pan American Games	Brazil	1–1	Argentina	Macomb, United States
	China 38'		Bonnano 83'	Stadium: Hanson Field; Referee: Raymond Morgan (CAN)

20 December 1959 1960 Pre-Olympic Tournament	Colombia	2–0	Brazil	Bogotá, Colombia
	Home 34', 55'			Stadium: Estadio El Campín; Referee: A. Menendez (MEX)

27 December 1959 1960 Pre-Olympic Tournament	Brazil	7–1	Colombia	Rio de Janeiro, Brazil
	China 18', 22', 50'; Manoelzinho 32', 57'; Gérson 64'		Manjarrés 80'	Stadium: Estádio do Maracanã; Referee: J. Brozzi (ARG)

== 1960 ==
19 April 1960 1960 Pre-Olympic Tournament	Brazil	2–1	Mexico	Lima, Peru
	Bruno 1'; China 26'		Álvarez 50'	Stadium: Estadio Nacional de Lima; Referee: Erwin Hiegger (NIR)

21 April 1960 1960 Pre-Olympic Tournament	Brazil	1–3	Argentina	Lima, Peru
	Jaburu		Desiderio; Oleniak	Stadium: Estadio Nacional de Lima; Referee: Erwin Hiegger (NIR)

27 April 1960 1960 Pre-Olympic Tournament	Suriname	1–4	Brazil	Lima, Peru
	Foe A Man 7'		Wooter 17' (o.g.); Maranhão 43'; China 63'; Jaburu 87'	Stadium: Estadio Nacional de Lima; Referee: C. Robles (CHI)

30 April 1960 1960 Pre-Olympic Tournament	Peru	2–0	Brazil	Lima, Peru
	Gallardo; Nieri			Stadium: Estadio Nacional de Lima; Referee: J. Brozzi (ARG)

24 July 1960 Unofficial friendly	Brazil	1–1	(Brazil) Tupynambás	Juiz de Fora, Brazil
	Jonas		Herculano	Stadium: Estádio Paes Soares; Referee: Guálter Portela Filho (BRA)

1 August 1960 Unofficial friendly	Brazil	4–0	(Brazil) Campo Grande	Rio de Janeiro, Brazil
	Geada; Waldir; Gérson; Wanderley			Stadium: Estádio Ítalo del Cima; Referee: Alberto Gama (BRA)

4 August 1960 Unofficial friendly	Brazil	1–0	(Brazil) Entrerriense	Três Rios, Brazil
	Chiquinho			Stadium: Estádio Odair Gama; Referee: Alberto Gama (BRA)

13 August 1960 Friendly	Peru	1–3	Brazil	Lima, Peru
	Altuna		Balanger (o.g.); Chiquinho; China	Stadium: Estadio Nacional de Lima; Referee: F. Mayer (AUT)

14 August 1960 Friendly	Peru	1–0	Brazil	Lima, Peru
	Mendoza			Stadium: Estadio Nacional de Lima; Referee: F. Mayer (AUT)

26 August 1960 1960 Olympics	Brazil	4–3	Great Britain	Livorno, Italy
	Gérson 2'; China 61', 72'; Wanderley 64'		Brown 32', 87'; Lewis 47'	Stadium: Stadio Armando Picchi; Referee: J. Kandlbinder (GER)

29 August 1960 1960 Olympics	Brazil	5–0	Taiwan	Rome, Italy
	Gérson 13', 16', 47'; Roberto Dias 73', 87'			Stadium: Stadio Flaminio; Referee: E. Erlich (YUG)

1 September 1960 1960 Olympics	Italy	3–1	Brazil	Florence, Italy
	Rivera 69'; Rossano 70', 86'		Waldir 4'	Stadium: Stadio Comunale; Referee: P. Schwinte (FRA)

14 February 1963 Unofficial friendly	Brazil	1–3	(Brazil) Santos	Santos, Brazil
	Dirceu		Pelé; Coutinho; Olavo	Stadium: Estádio Ulrico Mursa; Referee: Romualdo Arppi Filho (BRA)

24 April 1963 1963 Pan American Games	Brazil	3–1	Uruguay	São Paulo, Brazil
	Othon 7'; Aírton 12', 89'		Varela 57'	Stadium: Parque São Jorge; Referee: L. Goldestein (USA)

28 April 1963 1963 Pan American Games	Brazil	10–0	United States	São Paulo, Brazil
	Othon 6'; Aírton 10', 47', 57', 62', 65', 76', 87'; Nenê 35'; Jairzinho 40'			Stadium: Parque São Jorge; Referee: João Etzel Filho (BRA)

30 April 1963 1963 Pan American Games	Brazil	3–0	Chile	São Paulo, Brazil
	Jairzinho 9'; Othon 26'; Aírton 60'			Stadium: Parque São Jorge; Referee: L. Goldestein (USA)

4 May 1963 1963 Pan American Games	Brazil	2–2	Argentina	São Paulo, Brazil
	Aírton 60'; Othon 75'		Oleniak 87'; Manfredi 88'	Stadium: Parque São Jorge; Referee: C. Vicuña (CHI)

12 May 1964 1964 Pre-Olympic Tournament	Brazil	2–0	Chile	Lima, Peru
	Othon 23'; Ivo Soares 63'			Stadium: Estadio Nacional de Lima; Referee: A. Tejada (PER)

14 May 1964 1964 Pre-Olympic Tournament	Brazil	1–1	Colombia	Lima, Peru
	Nélio 63'		Padilla 70'	Stadium: Estadio Nacional de Lima; Referee: J. Cruzat (CHI)

18 May 1964 1964 Pre-Olympic Tournament	Brazil	3–1	Ecuador	Lima, Peru
	Zé Roberto 61'; Ivo Soares 70'; Nélio 76'		Ordoñez 58'	Stadium: Estadio Nacional de Lima; Referee: J. Praddaude (ARG)

7 June 1964 1964 Pre-Olympic Tournament	Brazil	4–0	Peru	Rio de Janeiro, Brazil
	Roberto Miranda 20'; Zé Roberto 30'; Evaldo 45', 84'			Stadium: Estádio do Maracanã; Referee: G. Dienst (SWI)

7 September 1964 Friendly	Brazil	3–0	Argentina	Rio de Janeiro, Brazil
	Zé Roberto 38', 45', 69'			Stadium: Estádio do Maracanã; Referee: J. Taylor (ENG)

12 October 1964 1964 Olympics	Brazil	1–1	United Arab Republic	Tokyo, Japan
	Roberto Miranda 10'	Report	Shanin 88'	Stadium: Komazawa Olympic Park; Attendance: 16,450; Referee: R. Glöckner (DDR)

14 October 1964 1964 Olympics	Brazil	4–0	South Korea	Yokohama, Japan
	Zé Roberto 30'; Elizeu 44', 54'; Roberto Miranda 73'	Report		Stadium: Mitsuzawa Field; Attendance: 12,672; Referee: S. Boukkili (MOR)

16 October 1964 1964 Olympics	Czechoslovakia	1–0	Brazil	Saitama, Japan
	Valošek 77'	Report		Stadium: Omiya Stadium; Attendance: 13,120; Referee: H. Tehrani (IRN)

4 February 1968 Unofficial friendly	Brazil	3–4	(Brazil) Atlético Paranaense	Curitiba, Brazil
	Ademir; Toninho Guerreiro		Milton Dias; Alfredo; Roberto	Stadium: Estádio Couto Pereira; Referee: Kalil Karan (BRA)

7 February 1968 Unofficial friendly	Brazil	3–1	(Brazil) Ferroviário	Curitiba, Brazil
	Dé; Lauro; Toninho Guerreiro		Nilzo	Stadium: Estádio Durival de Brito; Referee: Valdemar Nader (BRA)

12 February 1968 Unofficial friendly	Brazil	2–4	(Brazil) Londrina / União Bandeirante	Londrina, Brazil
	Manoel Maria; Ademir		Lidu; Paquito; Carlinhos; Nonda	Stadium: Estádio Vitorino Gonçalves Dias; Referee: Gilvan Alves de Oliveira (BRA)

19 March 1968 1968 Pre-Olympic Tournament	Brazil	0–0	Paraguay	Medellín, Colombia
				Stadium: Estadio Atanasio Girardot; Referee: P. Vaga (URU)

24 March 1968 1968 Pre-Olympic Tournament	Brazil	3–0	Venezuela	Barranquilla, Colombia
	Dionísio 39', 75'; Manoel Maria 65'			Stadium: Estadio Metropolitano; Referee: G. Velasquez (COL)

27 March 1968 1968 Pre-Olympic Tournament	Brazil	0–0	Chile	Medellín, Colombia
				Stadium: Estadio Atanasio Girardot; Referee: Erwin Hiegger (NIR)

31 March 1968 1968 Pre-Olympic Tournament	Uruguay	2–1	Brazil	Bogotá, Colombia
	Dutra 3' (o.g.); Brandon 60'		Ademir 8'	Stadium: Estadio El Campín; Referee: D. Goicoechea (ARG)

5 April 1968 1968 Pre-Olympic Tournament	Brazil	1–0 (awd.)	Paraguay	Bogotá, Colombia
				Stadium: Estadio El Campín; Referee: D. Goicoechea (ARG)

9 April 1968 1968 Pre-Olympic Tournament	Colombia	0–3	Brazil	Bogotá, Colombia
			Lauro 22', 75'; Ademir 33'	Stadium: Estadio El Campín; Referee: D. Goicoechea (ARG)

14 October 1968 1968 Olympics	Spain	1–0	Brazil	Mexico City, Mexico
	Fernández 77'	Report		Stadium: Estadio Azteca; Referee: A. Klein (ISR)

16 October 1968 1968 Olympics	Brazil	1–1	Japan	Puebla, Mexico
	Ferretti 9'	Report	Watanabe 83'	Stadium: Estadio Cuauhtémoc; Referee: G. Lamptey (GHA)

18 October 1968 1968 Olympics	Brazil	3–3	Nigeria	Puebla, Mexico
	Ferretti 50'; Olumodeji 59' (o.g.); Tião 65'	Report	Olayombo 10' 41'; Anieke 19'	Stadium: Estadio Cuauhtémoc; Referee: S. Tarekegn (ETH)

== 1970 ==
26 November 1971 1971 Pre-Olympic Tournament	Brazil	1–1	Ecuador	Cali, Colombia
	Nílson Dias 39'		Vágner 33' (o.g.)	Stadium: Estadio Pascual Guerrero; Referee: G. Velasquez (ARG)

28 November 1971 1971 Pre-Olympic Tournament	Brazil	2–1	Bolivia	Cali, Colombia
	Roberto Dinamite 36'; Nílson Dias 48'		Landa 78'	Stadium: Estadio Pascual Guerrero; Referee: J. Varrone (VEN)

30 November 1971 1971 Pre-Olympic Tournament	Brazil	0–0	Argentina	Cali, Colombia
				Stadium: Estadio Pascual Guerrero; Referee: R. Barreto (URU)

5 December 1971 1971 Pre-Olympic Tournament	Brazil	1–0	Chile	Medellín, Colombia
	Nílson Dias 65'			Stadium: Estadio Atanasio Girardot; Referee: E. Perez (PER)

7 December 1971 1971 Pre-Olympic Tournament	Colombia	1–1	Brazil	Bogotá, Colombia
	Santamaría 10'		Enéas 87'	Stadium: Estadio El Campín; Referee: O. Ortube (BOL)

9 December 1971 1971 Pre-Olympic Tournament	Brazil	1–0	Argentina	Bogotá, Colombia
	Zico 29'			Stadium: Estadio El Campín; Referee: R. Rodrigues (COL)

11 December 1971 1971 Pre-Olympic Tournament	Brazil	1–0	Peru	Bogotá, Colombia
	Enéas 56'			Stadium: Estadio El Campín; Referee: J. Silvagno (CHI)

4 June 1972 Unofficial friendly	Brazil	0–0	(Brazil) Vasco da Gama	Natal, Brazil
				Stadium: Machadão; Referee: Luiz Meireles (BRA)

7 June 1972 Unofficial friendly	Brazil	0–1	(Brazil) Santa Cruz	Recife, Brazil
			Betinho	Stadium: Estádio do Arruda; Referee: Arlindo Tavares (BRA)

10 June 1972 Unofficial friendly	Brazil A	2–1	Brazil	Uberaba, Brazil
	Rivellino; Jairzinho		Zé Carlos	Stadium: Estádio Engenheiro João Guido; Referee: Robert Helies (FRA)

13 June 1972 Unofficial friendly	Brazil	0–0	(Brazil) Atlético Mineiro	Belo Horizonte, Brazil
				Stadium: Estádio Mineirão; Referee: Armando Marques (BRA)

17 June 1972 Unofficial friendly	Brazil	4–1	(Germany) Hamburger SV	Porto Alegre, Brazil
	Falcão; Washington; Kaltz (o.g.)		Volkert	Stadium: Estádio Beira Rio; Referee: José de Assis Aragão (BRA)

29 June 1972 Unofficial friendly	Brazil	0–0	(Brazil) Bonsucesso	Petrópolis, Brazil
				Stadium: Estádio Atílio Marotti; Referee: Luís Carlos Félix (BRA)

2 July 1972 Unofficial friendly	Brazil	0–1	(Brazil) Flamengo	Rio de Janeiro, Brazil
			Caio Cambalhota	Stadium: Estádio do Maracanã; Referee: Rubens de Souza (BRA)

8 July 1972 Unofficial friendly	Brazil	0–0	(Brazil) Palmeiras	São Paulo, Brazil
				Stadium: Parque Antártica; Referee: Roberto Nunes Morgado (BRA)

6 August 1972 Unofficial friendly	Brazil	0–1	(Amazonas (Brazilian state)) Amazonas XI	Manaus, Brazil
			Nílson	Stadium: Estádio Vivaldo Lima; Referee: Manuel Francisco Gomes de Oliveira (BRA)

9 August 1972 Unofficial friendly	Brazil	1–0	(Brazil) Remo	Belém, Brazil
	Dirceu			Stadium: Baenão; Referee: Manuel Francisco Gomes de Oliveira (BRA)

11 August 1972 Unofficial friendly	Brazil	1–1	(Brazil) Tuna Luso	Belém, Brazil
	Roberto Dinamite		Clésio	Stadium: Estádio Francisco Vasques; Referee: Francisco de Jesus (BRA)

27 August 1972 1972 Olympics	Brazil	2–3	Denmark	Passau, West Germany
	Dirceu 68'; Zé Carlos 69'	Report	Simonsen 28' 83'; Røntved 50'	Stadium: Dreiflüssestadion; Attendance: 10.000; Referee: Pavel Kazakov (URS)

29 August 1972 1972 Olympics	Hungary	2–2	Brazil	Munich, West Germany
	A. Dunai 4'; Juhász 84'	Report	Pedrinho 67'; Dirceu 73'	Stadium: Olympic Stadium; Attendance: 50.000; Referee: William Mullan (GBR)

31 August 1972 1972 Olympics	Iran	1–0	Brazil	Regensburg, West Germany
	Halvai 63'	Report		Stadium: Jahnstadion; Attendance: 2.200; Referee: Gerhard Schulenburg (FRG)

6 September 1975 Unofficial friendly	Brazil	1–0	(São Paulo (state)) São Paulo	Rio de Janeiro, Brazil
	Darcy 49'	Report		Stadium: Estádio do Maracanã; Referee: Valquir Pimentel (BRA)

14 September 1975 Unofficial friendly	Brazil	2–0	Minas Gerais	Juiz de Fora, Brazil
	Cláudio Adão			Stadium: Estádio Procópio Teixeira; Referee: Serafim Martins Filho (BRA)

18 September 1975 Unofficial friendly	Brazil	0–0	(Brazil) Ponte Preta	Campinas, Brazil
				Stadium: Estádio Moisés Lucarelli; Referee: Roberto Nunes Morgado (BRA)

24 September 1975 Unofficial friendly	Santa Fe (Colombia)	3–3	Brazil	Bogotá, Colombia
	Sarnari; Pandolfi		Marcelo Oliveira; Cláudio Adão	Stadium: Estadio El Campín; Referee: Guillermo Velázquez (COL)

26 September 1975 Friendly	Colombia	2–1	Brazil	Bogotá, Colombia
	Estrada; Sanchéz		Cláudio Adão	Stadium: Estadio El Campín; Referee: L. Canessa (COL)

14 October 1975 1975 Pan American Games	Brazil	3–1	Costa Rica	Mexico City, Mexico
	Vázquez 23' (o.g.); Tiquinho 54'; Cláudio Adão 70'		Wanchope 85'	Stadium: Estadio Azteca; Referee: E. Mendoza (MEX)

15 October 1975 1975 Pan American Games	Brazil	2–0	El Salvador	Mexico City, Mexico
	Cláudio Adão 14'; Edinho 69'			Stadium: Estadio Azteca; Referee: D. De La Mora (PER)

17 October 1975 1975 Pan American Games	Brazil	14–0	Nicaragua	Mexico City, Mexico
	Luiz Alberto 1', 3', 16', 32'; Santos 5', 34'; Rosemiro 21'; Eudes 24'; Erivelto 30'; Fraga 59'; Batista 67', 74'; Marcelo Oliveira 72', 90'			Stadium: Estadio Azteca; Referee: I. Calderon (CUB)

19 October 1975 1975 Pan American Games	Brazil	6–0	Bolivia	Mexico City, Mexico
	Leguelé 16' (pen.); Cláudio Adão 37', 46', 86', 89'; Erivelto 90+1'			Stadium: Estadio Azteca; Referee: D. Malio (CAN)

21 October 1975 1975 Pan American Games	Brazil	0–0	Argentina	Mexico City, Mexico
				Stadium: Estadio Azteca; Referee: R. Gonzalez (CHI)

23 October 1975 1975 Pan American Games	Brazil	7–0	Trinidad and Tobago	Mexico City, Mexico
	Cláudio Adão 4', 40', 62'; Erivelto 15'; Santos 17', 84'; Eudes 18'			Stadium: Estadio Azteca; Referee: D. Malio (CAN)

25 October 1975 1975 Pan American Games	Mexico	1–1 (a.e.t.)	Brazil	Mexico City, Mexico
	Tapia 22'		Cláudio Adão 85' (pen.)	Stadium: Estadio Azteca; Referee: A. Ithurralde (ARG)

17 December 1975 Unofficial friendly	Brazil	0–3	Brazil Youth Team	Rio de Janeiro, Brazil
			Mendonça; Tainha	Stadium: Estádio do Maracanã; Referee: Saul Mendes (BRA)

21 January 1976 1976 Pre-Olympic Tournament	Brazil	1–1	Uruguay	Recife, Brazil
	Cláudio Adão 13'		Italiano 44'	Stadium: Estádio do Arruda; Referee: C. Orozco (PER)

25 January 1976 1976 Pre-Olympic Tournament	Brazil	4–0	Colombia	Recife, Brazil
	Erivelto 4', 63'; Cláudio Adão 11' (pen.); Leguelé 19'			Stadium: Estádio do Arruda; Referee: J. Silvagno (CHI)

27 January 1976 1976 Pre-Olympic Tournament	Brazil	2–1	Chile	Recife, Brazil
	Erivelto 34'; Cláudio Adão 57'		Orellana 72'	Stadium: Estádio do Arruda; Referee: Guillermo Velázquez (COL)

29 January 1976 1976 Pre-Olympic Tournament	Brazil	3–0	Peru	Recife, Brazil
	Leguelé 18'; Erivelto 38'; Santos 72'			Stadium: Estádio do Arruda; Referee: J. Bazán (URU)

1 February 1976 1976 Pre-Olympic Tournament	Brazil	2–0	Argentina	Recife, Brazil
	Cláudio Adão 2'; Erivelto 66'			Stadium: Estádio do Arruda; Referee: Guillermo Velázquez (COL)

19 May 1976 Unofficial friendly	Brazil	0–0	(Brazil) Volta Redonda	Rio de Janeiro, Brazil
				Stadium: Estádio do Maracanã; Referee: José Marçal Filho (BRA)

22 May 1976 Friendly	Mexico	0–0	Brazil	Mexico City, Mexico
				Stadium: Estadio Azteca; Referee: M. Rubio (MEX)

25 May 1976 Friendly	Kuwait	0–2	Brazil	Kuwait City, Kuwait
			Luís Fernando; Leguelé	Stadium: Kuwait University Stadium; Referee: K. Al Kenoy (KUW)

28 May 1976 Friendly	Iran	2–2	Brazil	Tehran, Iran
	Azizi; Nouraei		Erivelto; Leguelé	Stadium: Fara Diba Stadium; Referee: M. Zamani (IRN)

4 June 1976 Unofficial friendly	Vita Club Mokanda (Republic of the Congo)	0–2	Brazil	Pointe-Noire, Republic of the Congo
			Picolé; Marinho	Stadium: Stade Municipal de Pointe-Noire

6 June 1976 Friendly	Congo	0–2	Brazil	Brazzaville, Republic of the Congo
			Erivelto; Santos	Stadium: Stade Alphonse Massemba-Débat; Referee: G. Pouenga (CGO)

10 June 1976 Unofficial friendly	Léopard Douala (Cameroon)	1–3	Brazil	Douala, Cameroon
	Edoue		Erivelto; Jarbas	Stadium: Stade de la Réunification

13 June 1976 Friendly	Cameroon	1–1	Brazil	Yaounde, Cameroon
	Mokube		Júlio César	Stadium: Stade Ahmadou Ahidjo

16 June 1976 Unofficial friendly	Levante UD (Spain)	0–3	Brazil	Valencia, Spain
			Erivelto; Santos	Stadium: Luis Casanova; Referee: F. Hernandes (SPA)

22 June 1976 Tournoi de Paris	Europe XI	3–2	Brazil	Paris, France
	Bremner 42'; Georgescu 65'; Rosemiro 89' (o.g.)		Jarbas 20'; Erivelto 31'	Stadium: Parc des Princes

24 June 1976 Tournoi de Paris	PSG (France)	1–2	Brazil	Paris, France
	M'Pelé 36'		Rosemiro 45'; Luís Fernando 66'	Stadium: Parc des Princes; Referee: Marcel Bacou (FRA)

28 June 1976 Unofficial friendly	Banik Ostrava (Czech Republic)	1–0	Brazil	Ostrava, Czechoslovakia
	Slany			Stadium: Městský stadion Referee: Z. Jalinek (CZE)

30 June 1976 Friendly	Poland	3–0	Brazil	Chorzów, Poland
	Szarmach; Deyna			Stadium: Stadion Śląski; Referee: D. Parmakov (BUL)

18 July 1976 1976 Olympics	Brazil	0–0	East Germany	Toronto, Canada
		Report		Stadium: Varsity Stadium; Attendance: 21.643; Referee: John Paterson (United Kingdom)

20 July 1976 1976 Olympics	Brazil	2–1	Spain	Montreal, Canada
	Rosemiro 7'; Fraga 47' (pen.)	Report	Idígoras 14'	Stadium: Olympic Stadium; Attendance: 38.123; Referee: Paul Schiller (Austria)

25 July 1976 1976 Olympics	Brazil	4–1	Israel	Toronto, Canada
	Jarbas 56', 74'; Erivelto 72'; Júnior 88'	Report	Peretz 80'	Stadium: Varsity Stadium; Attendance: 18.601; Referee: Károly Palotai (Hungary)

27 July 1976 1976 Olympics	Brazil	0–2	Poland	Toronto, Canada
		Report	Szarmach 51' 82'	Stadium: Varsity Stadium; Attendance: 21.743; Referee: John Paterson (United Kingdom)

29 July 1976 1976 Olympics	Soviet Union	2–0	Brazil	Montreal, Canada
	Onyshchenko 5'; Nazarenko 49'	Report		Stadium: Olympic Stadium; Attendance: 55.647; Referee: Abraham Klein (Israel)

6 June 1979 Friendly	Paraguay	0–0	Brazil	Asunción, Paraguay
				Stadium: Defensores del Chaco; Referee: Gastón Castro (Chile)

12 June 1979 Tournoi de Paris	SL Benfica (Portugal)	2–0	Brazil	Paris, France
	Reinaldo 11'; Toni 88'			Stadium: Parc des Princes

14 June 1979 Tournoi de Paris	PSG (France)	4–3	Brazil	Paris, France
	Brisson 16'; Fernandez 53'; A. Bianchi 71'; C. Bianchi 87'		Mica 11'; Rogério 41'; Silva 87'	Stadium: Parc des Princes

15 June 1979 Unofficial friendly	FC Mulhouse (France)	3–1	Brazil	Mulhouse, France
	Six; Pfertzel		Cristóvão	Stadium: Stade de l'Ill

2 July 1979 1979 Pan American Games	Brazil	2–0	Guatemala	San Juan, Puerto Rico
	Silva; Mica			Stadium: Estadio Sixto Escobar; Referee: D. Soupliotis (Greece)

6 July 1979 1979 Pan American Games	Brazil	1–0	Cuba	San Juan, Puerto Rico
	Cristóvão			Stadium: Estadio Sixto Escobar; Referee: C. Espósito (Argentina)

8 July 1979 1979 Pan American Games	Brazil	3–1	Costa Rica	San Juan, Puerto Rico
	Silvinho; Édson Boaro; Jérson		Rojas	Stadium: Estadio Country Club; Referee: E. Townsend (Bermuda)

10 July 1979 1979 Pan American Games	Puerto Rico	0–5	Brazil	San Juan, Puerto Rico
			Silva; Mica; Cléo; Jérson	Stadium: Estadio Country Club; Referee: G. Castro (Chile)

14 July 1979 1979 Pan American Games	Brazil	3–0	Cuba	San Juan, Puerto Rico
	Wagner Basílio; Silva; Gilcimar			Stadium: Estadio Sixto Escobar; Referee: G. Castro (Chile)

30 October 1979 Friendly	Romania	2–1	Brazil	Bucharest, Romania
	Terches; Tikalm		Anselmo	Stadium: Stadionul August 23; Referee: Nicolae Rainea (Romania)

4 November 1979 Friendly	United Arab Emirates	1–5	Brazil	Dubai, United Arab Emirates
	Al-Khaleej		Anselmo; João Luiz; Neílson	Stadium: Rashid Stadium

7 November 1979 Friendly	United Arab Emirates	1–2	Brazil	Dubai, United Arab Emirates
	Ahmad		Djalma Bala; Souza	Stadium: Rashid Stadium

9 November 1979 Friendly	Bahrain	0–2	Brazil	Manama, Bahrain
			Souza; Anselmo	Stadium: Bahrain National Stadium

10 November 1979 Friendly	Qatar	1–3	Brazil	Doha, Qatar
	Brahimi		Brasinha; Anselmo	Stadium: Khalifa International Stadium

12 November 1979 Friendly	Qatar	1–3	Brazil	Doha, Qatar
	Massour		Djalma Bala; Rubem; Neílson	Stadium: Khalifa International Stadium

14 November 1979 Friendly	Kuwait	0–0	Brazil	Kuwait City, Kuwait
				Stadium: Al Kuwait Sports Club Stadium

== 1980 ==
23 January 1980 1980 Pre-Olympic Tournament	Brazil	2–1	Venezuela	Cali, Colombia
	Vítor 2'; Silva 50'		Peña 88'	Stadium: Estadio Pascual Guerrero; Referee: Guillermo Velázquez (Colombia)

27 January 1980 1980 Pre-Olympic Tournament	Peru	3–0	Brazil	Barranquilla, Colombia
	Zapata 49'; Medina 63', 86'			Stadium: Estadio Metropolitano; Referee: Abel Gnecco (Argentina)

30 January 1980 1980 Pre-Olympic Tournament	Brazil	4–0	Bolivia	Bogotá, Colombia
	Jorginho 5'; Cristóvão 17'; Rau 39' (o.g.); Anselmo 57'			Stadium: Estadio El Campín; Referee: Jose Lozada (Venezuela)

3 February 1980 1980 Pre-Olympic Tournament	Chile	0–0	Brazil	Barranquilla, Colombia
				Stadium: Estadio Metropolitano; Referee: Ramón Barreto (Uruguay)

7 February 1980 1980 Pre-Olympic Tournament	Argentina	3–1	Brazil	Bogotá, Colombia
	Randazzo 25'; Meza 82', 89' (pen.)		Jérson 55'	Stadium: Estadio El Campín; Referee: Enrico Revoredo (Peru)

10 February 1980 1980 Pre-Olympic Tournament	Colombia	5–1	Brazil	Cali, Colombia
	Sarmiento 38', 41', 43'; Agudelo 79'; Cardona 82'		João Luiz 72'	Stadium: Estadio Pascual Guerrero; Referee: Gastón Castro (Chile)

15 August 1983 1983 Pan American Games	Brazil	2–0	Argentina	Caracas, Venezuela
	Marcus Vinícius 27'; Heitor 36'			Stadium: Estadio Brígido Iriarte; Referee: Carlos Luis Alfaro (Costa Rica)

19 August 1983 1983 Pan American Games	Brazil	1–0	Mexico	Caracas, Venezuela
	Heitor 2'			Stadium: Estadio Brígido Iriarte; Referee: Mario Lira (Chile)

23 August 1983 1983 Pan American Games	Uruguay	1–0	Brazil	Caracas, Venezuela
	Peirano 86'			Stadium: Estadio Brígido Iriarte; Referee: Mario Lira (Chile)

15 December 1983 Unofficial friendly	Brazil	2–1	(Federal District (Brazil)) Distrito Federal XI	Brasília, Brazil
	Marcus Vinícius; Chicão		Péricles	Stadium: Estádio Mané Garrincha; Referee: José de Assis Aragão (Brazil)

19 January 1984 Friendly	Brazil	1–1	Paraguay	Campo Grande, Brazil
	Marcus Vinícius		Mendoza	Stadium: Morenão; Referee: Ulisses Tavares (Brazil)

22 January 1984 Friendly	Brazil	1–0	Paraguay	Campo Grande, Brazil
	Édson Boaro			Stadium: Morenão; Referee: Wilson Carlos dos Santos (Brazil)

25 January 1984 Friendly	Brazil	3–1	Romania	Florianópolis, Brazil
	Mirandinha; Leiz; Édson Boaro		Cămătaru	Stadium: Estádio Orlando Scarpelli; Referee: Roque José Gallas (Brazil)

28 January 1984 Friendly	Brazil	3–0	Romania	Curitiba, Brazil
	Mirandinha; Vítor; Renê			Stadium: Estádio Couto Pereira; Referee: Ethel Rodrigues (Brazil)

12 February 1984 1984 Pre-Olympic Tournament	Brazil	2–1	Colombia	Guayaquil, Ecuador
	Riascos 27' (o.g.); Dunga 75'		Pérez 37'	Stadium: Estadio Modelo; Referee: Sergio Vásquez (Chile)

15 February 1984 1984 Pre-Olympic Tournament	Ecuador	0–0	Brazil	Guayaquil, Ecuador
				Stadium: Estadio Modelo; Referee: Gabriel González (Paraguay)

17 February 1984 1984 Pre-Olympic Tournament	Brazil	2–0	Paraguay	Guayaquil, Ecuador
	Mirandinha 22', 55'			Stadium: Estadio Modelo; Referee: Carlos Montalbán (Peru)

19 February 1984 1984 Pre-Olympic Tournament	Ecuador	0–2	Brazil	Guayaquil, Ecuador
			Dunga 13'; Vítor 86' (pen.)	Stadium: Estadio Modelo; Referee: Ernesto Filippi (Ecuador)

21 February 1984 1984 Pre-Olympic Tournament	Brazil	3–2	Chile	Guayaquil, Ecuador
	Vítor 25', 50' (pen.); Gersinho 69'		Valdés 48'; Núñez 66'	Stadium: Estadio Modelo; Referee: Horacio Di Rosa (Venezuela)

11 June 1984 Unofficial friendly	Brazil	1–0	(Brazil) Campo Grande	Rio de Janeiro, Brazil
	Gilmar Popoca			Stadium: Estádio do Maracanã; Referee: Pedro Carlos Bregalda (Brazil)

17 June 1984 Unofficial friendly	Brazil	3–3	(Brazil) Santo André	São Paulo, Brazil
	Chicão; Tonho		Jones; Élcio	Stadium: Estádio do Morumbi; Referee: Dulcídio Boschilla (Brazil)

21 June 1984 Unofficial friendly	Brazil	2–0	(Brazil) Coritiba	Curitiba, Brazil
	Albeneier; Gilmar Popoca			Stadium: Estádio Couto Pereira; Referee: Aírton Bernardoni (Brazil)

30 July 1984 1984 Olympics	Brazil	3–1	Saudi Arabia	Pasadena, United States
19:00	Gilmar Popoca 12'; Silvinho 50'; Dunga 59'	Report	Abdullah 69'	Stadium: Rose Bowl; Attendance: 40,799; Referee: Brian McGinlay (GBR)

1 August 1984 1984 Olympics	Brazil	1–0	West Germany	Palo Alto, United States
19:00	Gilmar Popoca 86'	Report		Stadium: Stanford Stadium; Attendance: 75,239; Referee: Kyung-Bok Cha (KOR)

3 August 1984 1984 Olympics	Brazil	2–0	Morocco	Pasadena, United States
19:00	Dunga 64'; Kita 70'	Report		Stadium: Rose Bowl; Attendance: 49,355; Referee: Arminio Victoriano Sánchez (ESP)

6 August 1984 1984 Olympics	Brazil	1–1 (a.e.t.) (4–2 p)	Canada	Palo Alto, United States
15:00	Gilmar Popoca 72'	Report	Mitchell 58'	Stadium: Stanford Stadium; Attendance: 36,150; Referee: Luis Paulino Siles (CRC)
	Penalties
	Gilmar Popoca (penalty scored); Kita (penalty scored); Ademir (penalty scored); André Luiz (penalty scored)		(penalty scored) Wilson; (penalty missed) Mitchell; (penalty missed) Bridge; (penalty scored) Gray

8 August 1984 1984 Olympics	Italy	1–2 (a.e.t.)	Brazil	Palo Alto, United States
20:30	Fanna 62'	Report	Gilmar Popoca 53'; Ronaldo Silva 95'	Stadium: Stanford Stadium; Attendance: 83,642; Referee: David Socha (USA)

11 August 1984 1984 Olympics	France	2–0	Brazil	Pasadena, United States
19:00	Brisson 55'; Xuereb 60'	Report		Stadium: Rose Bowl; Attendance: 101,799; Referee: Jan Keizer (NED)

25 November 1986 1986 South American Games	Brazil	1–1	Paraguay	Santiago, Chile
	Everaldo		Torres	Stadium: Estadio Nacional de Chile; Referee: J. Ramirez (PER)

1 December 1986 1986 South American Games	Brazil	3–0	Bolivia	Santiago, Chile
	Wallace; Dida			Stadium: Estadio Nacional de Chile; Referee: L. La Rosa (URU)

4 December 1986 1986 South American Games	Brazil	1–1	Colombia	Santiago, Chile
	Wallace		Peña	Stadium: Estadio Nacional de Chile; Referee: A. Brats (USA)

6 December 1986 1986 South American Games	Chile	0–1	Brazil	Santiago, Chile
			Édson Carioca	Stadium: Estadio Nacional de Chile; Referee: R. Rodriguez (ELS)

28 March 1987 Friendly	Brazil	1–0	Uruguay	Belo Horizonte, Brazil
	Faral (o.g.)			Stadium: Estádio Mineirão; Referee: Romualdo Arppi Filho (Brazil)

5 April 1987 Friendly	Bolivia	2–2	Brazil	Cochabamba, Bolivia
	Salinas		Edu Marangon; Evair	Stadium: Estadio Félix Capriles; Referee: M. Boado (Bolivia)

15 April 1987 Unofficial friendly	The Strongest (Bolivia)	2–3	Brazil	La Paz, Bolivia
	Panichelli; Galarza		Bebeto; Evair; Mirandinha	Stadium: Estadio Hernando Siles; Referee: J. Papon (Bolivia)

18 April 1987 1987 Pre-Olympic Tournament	Brazil	3–1	Paraguay	Santa Cruz de la Sierra, Bolivia
	João Paulo 45'; Bebeto 75'; Mirandinha 78'		Franco 66'	Stadium: Estadio Ramón Tahuichi Aguilera; Referee: E. Jácome (Ecuador)

20 April 1987 1987 Pre-Olympic Tournament	Colombia	2–0	Brazil	Santa Cruz de la Sierra, Bolivia
	Galeano; Trellez			Stadium: Estadio Ramón Tahuichi Aguilera; Referee: Gastón Castro (Chile)

24 April 1987 1987 Pre-Olympic Tournament	Uruguay	1–1	Brazil	Santa Cruz de la Sierra, Bolivia
	Bengoechea		Mirandinha	Stadium: Estadio Ramón Tahuichi Aguilera; Referee: J. Romero (Argentina)

26 April 1987 1987 Pre-Olympic Tournament	Peru	1–1	Brazil	Santa Cruz de la Sierra, Bolivia
	La Rosa		Douglas	Stadium: Estadio Ramón Tahuichi Aguilera; Referee: Gastón Castro (Chile)

29 April 1987 1987 Pre-Olympic Tournament	Argentina	2–0	Brazil	La Paz, Bolivia
	Perazzo 15'; Alfaro 73'			Stadium: Estadio Hernando Siles; Referee: Gastón Castro (Chile)

1 May 1987 1987 Pre-Olympic Tournament	Brazil	2–1	Colombia	La Paz, Bolivia
	Jorginho 61'; João Paulo 70'		Maturana 47'	Stadium: Estadio Hernando Siles; Referee: E. Codesal (Mexico)

3 May 1987 1987 Pre-Olympic Tournament	Bolivia	1–2	Brazil	La Paz, Bolivia
	Denílson 76' (o.g.)		Valdo 40'; Mirandinha 64'	Stadium: Estadio Hernando Siles; Referee: E. Jácome (Ecuador)

10 August 1987 1987 Pan American Games	Brazil	4–1	Canada	Indianapolis, United States
	Evair; Nelsinho; Tony (o.g.); João Paulo		Neil	Stadium: Kuntz Memorial Soccer Stadium; Referee: C. Montalván (Peru)

13 August 1987 1987 Pan American Games	Brazil	3–1	Cuba	Indianapolis, United States
	Careca; André Cruz; Washington		Rivero	Stadium: Kuntz Memorial Soccer Stadium; Referee: J. Garza (Mexico)

16 August 1987 1987 Pan American Games	Brazil	0–0	Chile	Indianapolis, United States
				Stadium: Kuntz Memorial Soccer Stadium; Referee: R. Martinez (Honduras)

18 August 1987 1987 Pan American Games	Brazil	1–0 (a.e.t.)	Mexico	Indianapolis, United States
	Evair			Stadium: Kuntz Memorial Soccer Stadium; Referee: A. Bratsis (United States)

21 August 1987 1987 Pan American Games	Brazil	2–0 (a.e.t.)	Chile	Indianapolis, United States
	Washington 105'; Evair 115'			Stadium: Kuntz Memorial Soccer Stadium; Referee: R. Martinez (Honduras)

24 August 1988 Unofficial friendly	Brazil	6–1	Alagoas XI	Maceió, Brazil
	Romário; Bebeto; Geovani		Ivanildo	Stadium: Estádio Rei Pelé; Referee: Romualdo Arppi Filho (Brazil)

30 August 1988 Friendly	Brazil	1–1	Argentina	Los Angeles, United States
	Romário		Comas	Stadium: Los Angeles Memorial Coliseum; Referee: A. Angeles (United States)

3 September 1988 Unofficial friendly	Brazil	3–0	(Mexico) América	Los Angeles, United States
	Romário			Stadium: Los Angeles Memorial Coliseum; Referee: A. Angeles (United States)

5 September 1988 Unofficial friendly	Brazil	3–2	(Mexico) América	Chicago, United States
	Winck; Edmar; Jorginho		Zague	Stadium: Comiskey Park; Referee: A. Kleinaiti (United States)

9 September 1988 Unofficial friendly	Brazil	2–0	(Mexico) Chivas Guadalajara	San Jose, United States
	Careca; Edmar			Stadium: Municipal Stadium; Referee: A. Barra (United States)

18 September 1988 1988 Olympics	Brazil	4–0	Nigeria	Daejeon, South Korea
19:00	Edmar 59'; Romário 74', 84'; Bebeto 86'			Stadium: Hanbat Stadium; Attendance: 29.512; Referee: Vincent Mauro (United States)

20 September 1988 1988 Olympics	Brazil	3–0	Australia	Seoul, South Korea
17:00	Romário 20', 57', 61'			Stadium: Dongdaemun Stadium; Attendance: 24.000; Referee: Choi Gil-Soo (South Korea)

22 September 1988 1988 Olympics	Brazil	2–1	Yugoslavia	Daejeon, South Korea
19:00	André Cruz 25'; Bebeto 56'		Šabanadžović 69'	Stadium: Hanbat Stadium; Attendance: 31.200; Referee: Alexey Spirin (Soviet Union)

25 September 1988 1988 Olympics	Brazil	1–0	Argentina	Seoul, South Korea
19:00	Geovani 76'			Stadium: Dongdaemun Stadium; Attendance: 21.800; Referee: Kurt Röthlisberger (Switzerland)

27 September 1988 1988 Olympics	Brazil	1–1 (a.e.t.) (3–2 p)	West Germany	Seoul, South Korea
20:00	Romário 79'		Fach 50'	Stadium: Olympic Stadium; Attendance: 65.000; Referee: Keith Hackett (England)
	Penalties
	João Paulo (penalty scored); Winck (penalty scored); Romário (penalty scored); André Cruz (penalty missed)		(penalty missed) Janßen; (penalty missed) Klinsmann; (penalty scored) Kleppinger; (penalty scored) Fach; (penalty missed) Wuttke

1 October 1988 1988 Olympics	Soviet Union	2–1 (a.e.t.)	Brazil	Seoul, South Korea
19:00	Dobrovolski 60' (pen.); Savichev 103'		Romário 29'	Stadium: Olympic Stadium; Attendance: 74.000; Referee: Gérard Biguet (France)

== Record by opponent ==
Positive Record Neutral Record Negative Record

Opponent	Pld	W	D	L	GF	GA	GD	Win %
Argentina	13	5	5	3	15	12	+3	38.47%
Australia	1	1	0	0	3	0	+3	100.00%
Bahrain	1	1	0	0	2	0	+2	100.00%
Bolivia	6	5	1	0	19	4	+15	83.34%
Cameroon	1	0	1	0	1	1	0	0.00%
Canada	2	1	1	0	5	2	+3	50.00%
Chile	10	7	3	0	14	3	+11	70.00%
Colombia	12	5	4	3	23	17	6	41.67%
Congo	1	1	0	0	2	0	+2	100.00%
Costa Rica	3	3	0	0	10	4	+6	100.00%
Cuba	4	4	0	0	11	1	+10	100.00%
Czechoslovakia	1	0	0	1	0	1	–1	0.00%
Denmark	1	0	0	1	2	3	–1	0.00%
East Germany	1	0	1	0	0	0	0	0.00%
Ecuador	4	2	2	0	6	2	+4	50.00%
El Salvador	1	1	0	0	2	0	+2	100.00%
France	1	0	0	1	0	2	–2	0.00%
Great Britain	1	1	0	0	4	3	+1	100.00%
Guatemala	1	1	0	0	2	0	+2	100.00%
Haiti	1	1	0	0	9	1	+8	100.00%
Hungary	1	0	1	0	2	2	0	0.00%
Iran	2	0	1	1	2	3	–1	0.00%
Israel	1	1	0	0	4	1	+3	100.00%
Italy	2	1	0	1	3	4	–1	50.00%
Japan	1	0	1	0	1	1	0	0.00%
Kuwait	2	1	1	0	2	0	+2	50.00%
Luxembourg	1	1	0	0	2	1	+1	100.00%
Mexico	6	4	2	0	11	4	+7	66.67%
Morocco	1	1	0	0	2	0	+2	100.00%
Netherlands	1	1	0	0	5	1	+4	100.00%
Nicaragua	1	1	0	0	14	0	+14	100.00%
Nigeria	2	1	1	0	7	3	+4	50.00%
Paraguay	8	4	4	0	9	3	+6	50.00%
Peru	8	4	1	3	12	8	+4	50.00%
Poland	2	0	0	2	0	5	–5	0.00%
Puerto Rico	1	1	0	0	5	0	+5	100.00%
Qatar	2	2	0	0	6	2	+4	100.00%
Taiwan	1	1	0	0	5	0	+5	100.00%
Romania	3	2	0	1	7	3	+4	66.67%
Saudi Arabia	1	1	0	0	3	1	+2	100.00%
South Korea	1	1	0	0	4	0	+4	100.00%
Soviet Union	2	0	0	2	1	4	–3	0.00%
Spain	2	1	0	1	2	2	0	50.00%
Suriname	1	1	0	0	4	1	+3	100.00%
Trinidad and Tobago	1	1	0	0	7	0	+7	100.00%
United Arab Emirates	2	2	0	0	7	2	+5	100.00%
United Arab Republic	1	0	1	0	1	1	0	0.00%
United States	2	1	0	1	13	5	+8	50.00%
Uruguay	6	2	2	2	7	6	+1	33.34%
Venezuela	2	2	0	0	5	1	+4	100.00%
Yugoslavia	1	1	0	0	2	1	+1	100.00%
West Germany	3	1	1	1	4	5	–1	33.34%
Total (52)	137	79	34	24	289	126	+163	57.66%
