= Argentina national under-23 football team =

National association football team

Argentina Olympic
- Nickname(s): La Selección (The Selection); La Albiceleste (The White and Sky Blue)
- Association: Asociación del Fútbol Argentino (Argentine Football Association)
- Confederation: CONMEBOL (South American Football Confederation)
- Head coach: Vacant
- Captain: Thiago Almada
- Most caps: Javier Mascherano (20)
- Top scorer: Domingo Tarasconi, Adolfo Gaich (9 each)
- Home stadium: Various
- FIFA code: ARG
First colours	Second colours

First international
- Argentina 11–2 United States (Amsterdam, Netherlands; 29 May 1928)

Biggest win
- Argentina 14–0 Canary Islands (Las Palmas, Spain; 14 November 2019)

Biggest defeat
- Brazil 3–0 Argentina (Bucaramanga, Colombia; 9 February 2020); Japan 3–0 Argentina (Kitakyushu, Japan; 29 March 2021); Japan 5–2 Argentina (Shimizu, Japan; 18 November 2023)

Olympic Games
- Appearances: 10
- Best result: Gold medalist (2004, 2008)

Pan American Games
- Appearances: 15 (first in 1951)
- Best result: Gold medalist (1951, 1955, 1959, 1975, 1995, 2003, 2019)

CONMEBOL Pre-Olympic Tournament
- Appearances: 12 (first in 1960)
- Best result: Gold medalist (1960, 1964, 1980, 2004, 2020)
Medal record
Olympic Games
Gold medal – first place	2004 Athens	Team
Gold medal – first place	2008 Beijing	Team
Silver medal – second place	1996 Atlanta	Team
Pan American Games
Gold medal – first place	1951 Buenos Aires	Team
Gold medal – first place	1955 Mexico City	Team
Gold medal – first place	1959 Chicago	Team
Gold medal – first place	1971 Cali	Team
Gold medal – first place	1995 Mar del Plata	Team
Gold medal – first place	2003 Santo Domingo	Team
Gold medal – first place	2019 Lima	Team
Silver medal – second place	1963 São Paulo	Team
Silver medal – second place	2011 Guadalajara	Team
Bronze medal – third place	1975 Mexico City	Team
Bronze medal – third place	1979 San Juan	Team
Bronze medal – third place	1987 Indianapolis	Team
CONMEBOL Pre-Olympic Tournament
Gold medal – first place	1960 Peru	Team
Gold medal – first place	1964 Peru	Team
Gold medal – first place	1980 Colombia	Team
Gold medal – first place	2004 Chile	Team
Gold medal – first place	2020 Colombia	Team
Silver medal – second place	1987 Bolivia	Team
Silver medal – second place	1996 Argentina	Team
Silver medal – second place	2024 Venezuela	Team
Bronze medal – third place	1971 Colombia	Team
Bronze medal – third place	1976 Brazil	Team
Bronze medal – third place	2000 Brazil	Team

The Argentina Olympic football team (Argentina U-23 since 1992) represents Argentina in international football competitions during the Olympic Games and the Pan American Games. The selection is limited to players under the age of 23, except three overage players. The team is controlled by the Argentine Football Association (AFA).

The first participation of Argentina in Olympic tournaments was in 1928, when the team was runner-up to champions Uruguay at the Games held in Amsterdam. By those times, rules stated that only amateur squads could compete, so Argentina (and also Uruguay) played with senior players so football was still not professional in those countries by then.

Argentina would not participate in Olympic Games until 1960 when the squad had a modest performance, finishing 7th. The team contested the competition with youth amateur players. After the IOC allowed professional players to participate (with an age limit of 23 years old) Argentina returned in 1996 when the squad won their second silver medal after losing to Nigeria in the final. In 2004 and coached by Marcelo Bielsa, Argentina won their first gold medal with Carlos Tevez finishing as top scorer with eight goals. Four years later, Argentina won their second gold medal in Beijing, taking revenge against Nigeria with a 1–0 win in the final.

== History ==
=== First participation ===
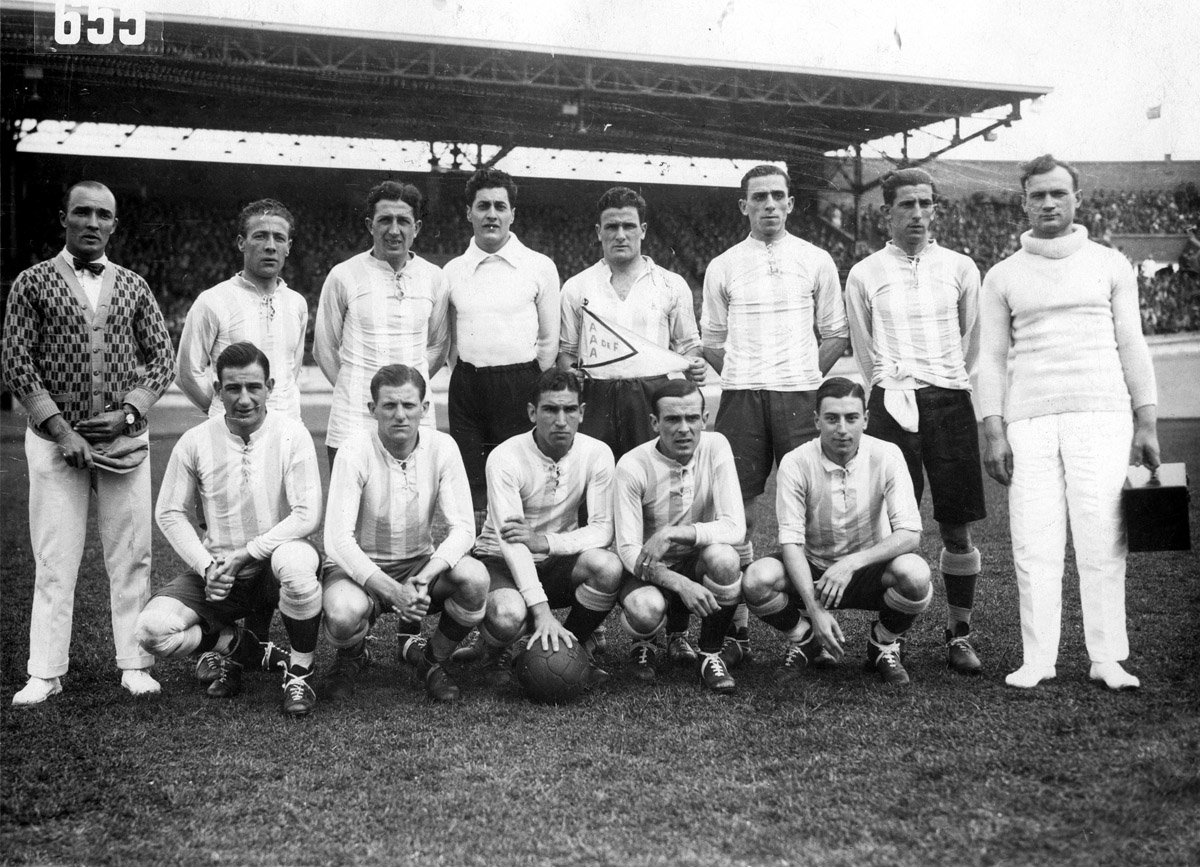
The team that won the Silver Medal at the 1928 Olympics

Argentina took part for the first time in the 1928 Olympic Games held in the Netherlands. Although the Olympics were restricted to amateur teams only, Argentina competed with its senior squad so football was not professional in the country until 1931. The team advanced to the final after defeating the United States by a thrashing 11–2 in the first round, and Belgium (6–3) in the second. In the semi-finals, the national team smashed Egypt by 6–0 to qualify for the final against Uruguay.

The first match ended in a 1–1 tie so a second game had to be played three days later. In the decisive match, Uruguay won the tournament after defeating Argentina 2–1, winning the Gold Medal. The Argentine line-up was Bossio, Bidoglio, Paternóster, Médice, Monti, Evaristo, Carricaberri, Tarasconi, Ferreira, Perduca, Orsi. Tarasconi was also the topscorer of the competition with 11 goals.

=== 1932–84: few participations ===
In 1932 no football tournament was held, and the resumption of the competition in 1936 (where Argentina did not take part) was followed by interruption until 1948 due to World War II. Because of an agreement between FIFA and the IOC, only amateur players were allowed to play in the football tournaments from then on.

Argentina returned to football competition in the 1960 games held in Rome. The squad was eliminated in the first round after a 3–2 loss to Denmark, although the team won its successive games against Tunisia (2–1) and Poland (2–0). Argentina placed second to Denmark.

Argentina's next participation was at the 1964 Summer Olympics organized by Tokyo, where the team finished in the last position of the group after a 1–1 draw with Ghana and a 2–3 loss to Japan. Since then, Argentina had a long absence from the games, not having taken part in the 1968, 1972, 1976, 1980 and 1984 Olympics.

=== 1988–92 ===
The national team returned for the 1988 Summer Olympics held in Seoul. The changes made by the IOC since 1984 (where Argentina did not participate) allowed the squad to include professional players in their lists, some of them with several years playing in Primera División, such as Luis Islas, Pedro Monzón, Néstor Fabbri, Darío Siviski and Jorge Comas, among others. In the group stage, Argentina tied 1–1 to the United States, then beat South Korea by 2–1, finishing second to the Soviet Union and qualifying to the next stage. In the quarter-finals, Argentina lost to Brazil 2–1, being eliminated from the competition.

Since the 1992 edition, the IOC stated that all football players should be under 23 years old, beyond they were professional or not. Coached by Alfio Basile, Argentina went to play the qualification tournament with experienced players such as Diego Simeone, Diego Latorre, Antonio Mohamed, Fernando Gamboa and Leonardo Astrada, who had also won the Copa América one year before. Nevertheless, Argentina failed to qualify for the games, finishing 3rd. in group B after Paraguay and Colombia therefore being eliminated in first round.

Since the 1996 Games, the IOC allowed squads to include a maximum of three over-23 players in their rosters.

=== Return to podium ===
Argentina came back to the competition in the 1996 edition held in Atlanta, United States. For the first time in the history of the Olympics, the IOC allowed football representatives to register a maximum of three above-23 players. The Argentine players registered under that condition were Diego Simeone, José Chamot and Roberto Sensini. Former senior team captain Daniel Passarella was the manager.

The national team debuted with a 3–1 victory over the United States, then tied to Portugal and Tunisia, both 1–1, to finish first the group and qualify for the second round. In the quarter-finals, Argentina trashed Spain 4–0 which allowed the team to pass to the semi-finals, where it defeated Portugal 2–0. After 66 years since the first final played in Amsterdam, Argentina reached its second Olympic final. The match was played on 3 August 1996 and Argentina lost to Nigeria 2–3. The line-up for the final was: Cavallero; Javier Zanetti, Roberto Ayala, Roberto Sensini, José Chamot; Christian Bassedas, Matías Almeyda, Ariel Ortega, Hugo Morales; Claudio López and Hernán Crespo. Other players squad players included Carlos Bossio, Marcelo Gallardo and Marcelo Delgado. In the next edition of the Games, 2000, Argentina did not participate.

=== First gold ===
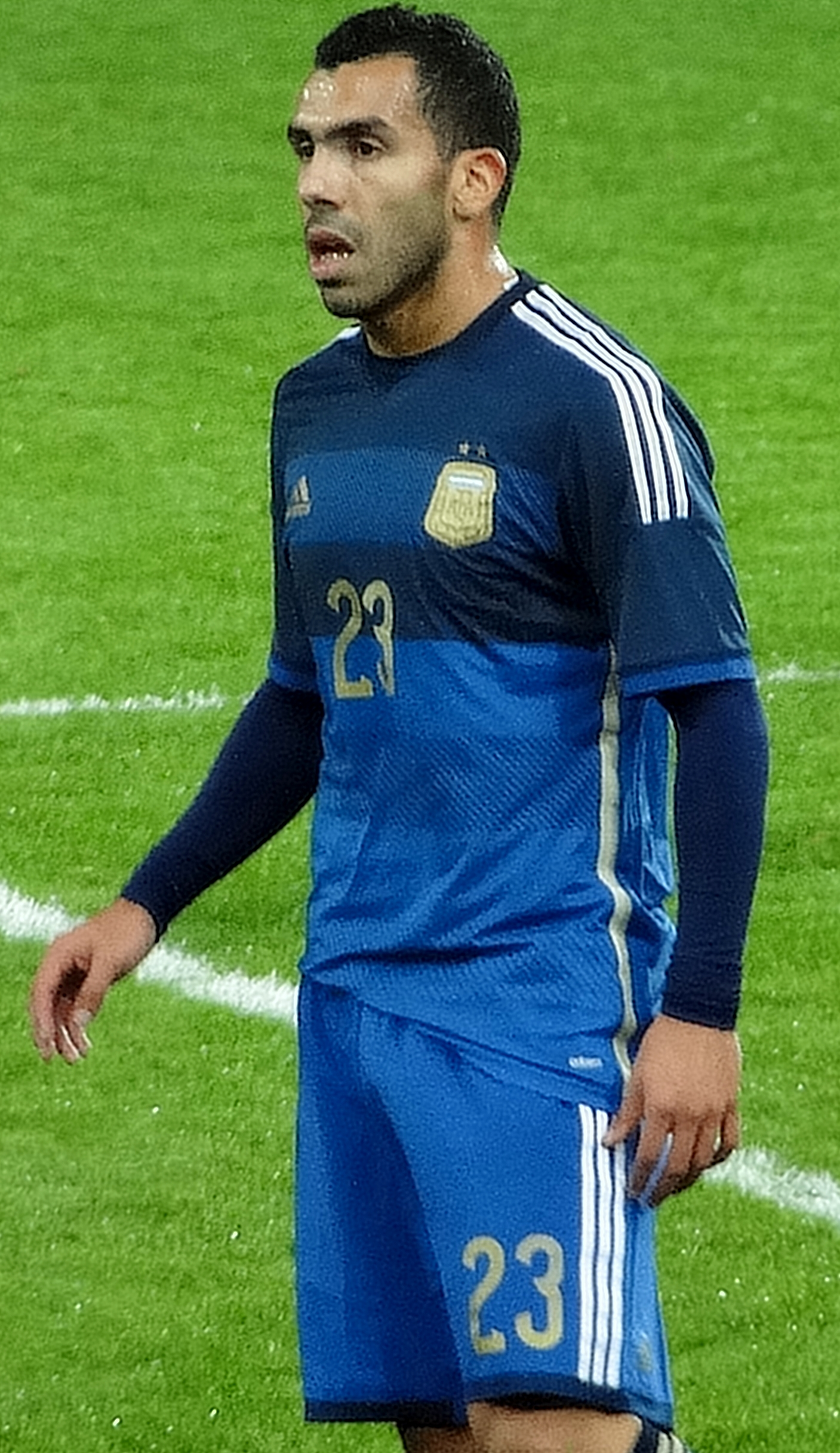
Carlos Tevez, key player and top scorer (8 goals) in 2004, when Argentina won its first gold medal

The 2004 Summer Olympics were held in Athens and Argentina returned to the competition after the absence in Sydney. The squad, managed by Marcelo Bielsa, won the gold medal for the first time in its history. Before playing the final, Argentina won all the games in the first round, thrashing Serbia and Montenegro 6–0 then defeating Tunisia and Australia. Argentina finished first in the group with no goals conceded. In the quarter-finals, Argentina smashed Costa Rica 4–0, reaching the semi-finals against Italy which it beat 3–0. Argentina played the final against Paraguay on 28 August 2004, winning not only the game (1–0) but the gold medal as well.

Argentina won the competition with an astounding campaign, winning the six matches played, with no goals allowed during the tournament. The team also totaled 17 goals (2.83 per match). The line-up for the final was: Germán Lux; Fabricio Coloccini, Roberto Ayala, Gabriel Heinze; Lucho González, Javier Mascherano, Kily González, Andrés D'Alessandro, Carlos Tevez; Mauro Rosales and César Delgado. The most notable player of the tournament was Tevez, who finished as topscorer with eight goals.

=== Second gold ===
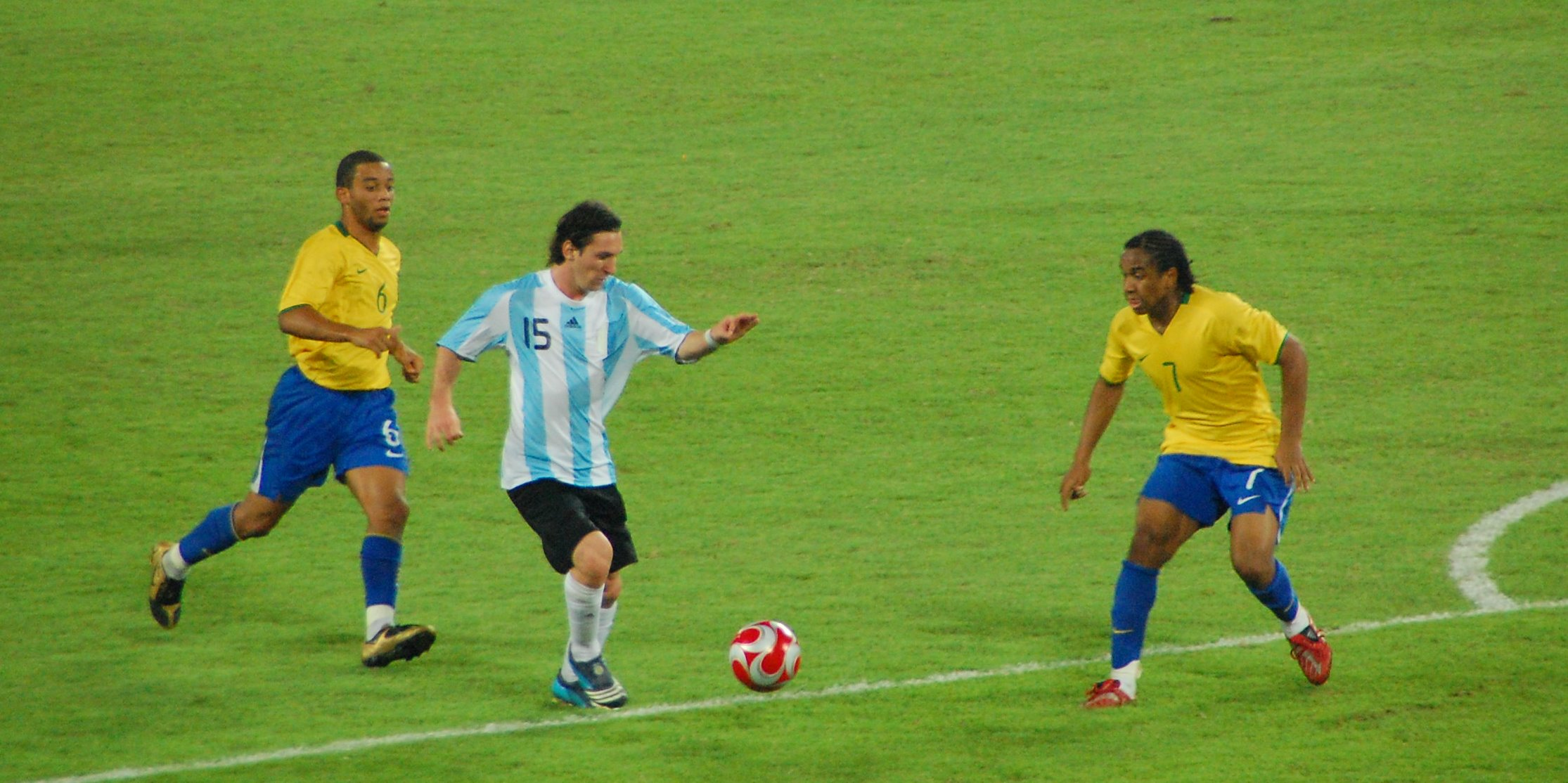
Lionel Messi against Brazil in the semi-final match in 2008, when the team won its second gold medal

The 2008 Summer Olympics were held in Beijing where Argentina, coached by former World Champion Sergio Batista, won their second consecutive gold medal. The squad debuted with a 2–1 victory over the Ivory Coast, then defeating Australia (1–0) and Serbia (2–0). In the knockout stage, Argentina eliminated the Netherlands (aet) by 2–1, thrashed Brazil by 3–0 and won the gold medal in the final match against Nigeria, 1–0.

Argentina won all the matches played (six), scoring 11 goals with only two conceded. Some of the most notable players of the tournament were Lionel Messi, Sergio Agüero, Ángel Di María, Éver Banega, Ezequiel Lavezzi, Fernando Gago and Pablo Zabaleta, who would all play for the senior team in successive years.

The three over-23 years players were Juan Román Riquelme, Javier Mascherano and Nicolás Pareja.

=== 2012–present ===
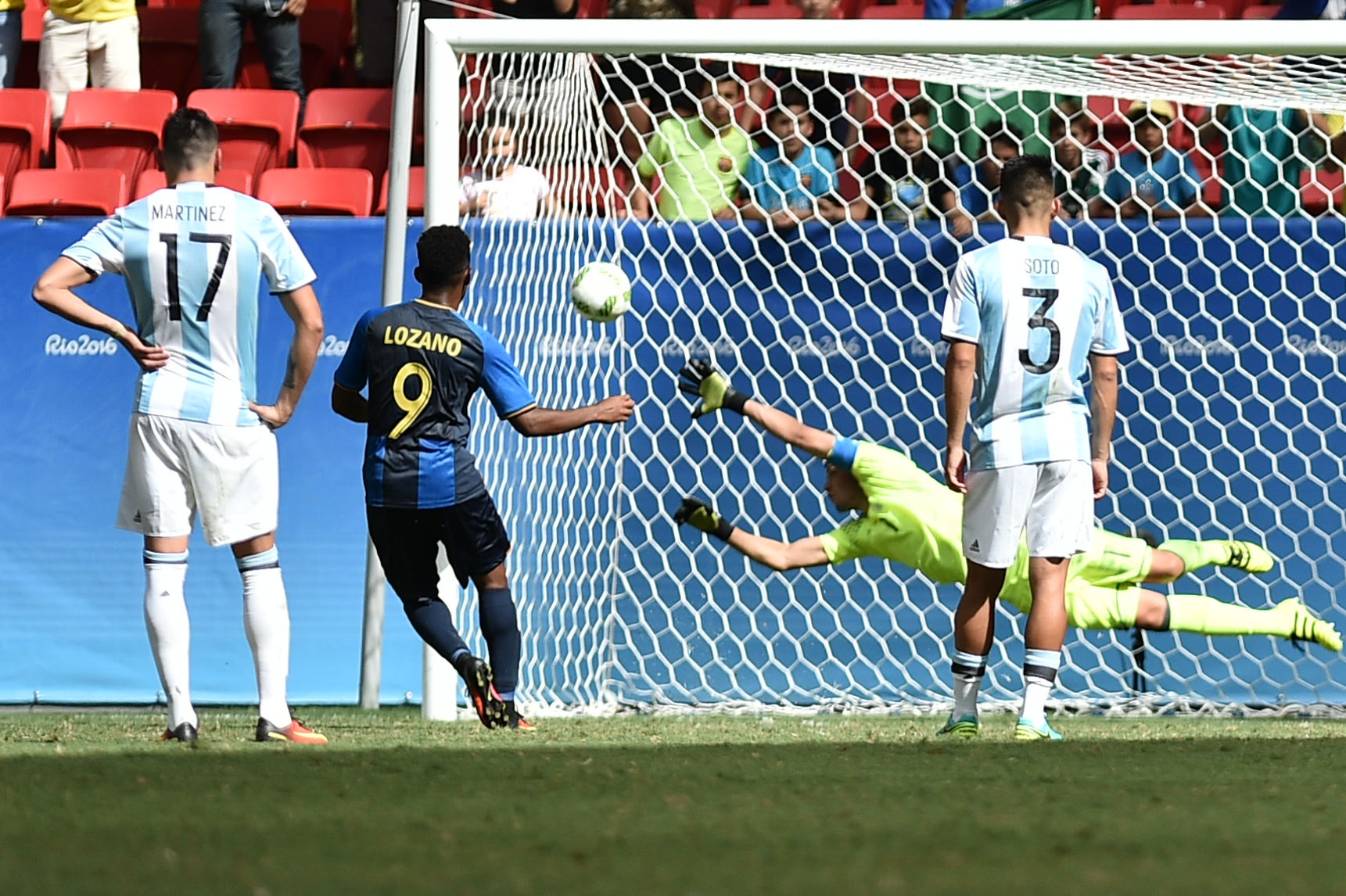
Anthony Lozano scores the goal for Honduras during the match where Argentina was eliminated in 2016

Argentina failed to qualify for the 2012 Summer Olympics held in London. The 2011 South American U-20 Championship qualified the top two teams for the Olympics. Argentina failed to qualify in the final stage, finishing 3rd. after Brazil and Uruguay.

For the 2016 competition held in Rio de Janeiro, most of the players called up for the squad were not given permission to play by their respective clubs, including Paulo Dybala, Mauro Icardi, Matías Kranevitter, Luciano Vietto, Ramiro Funes Mori and goalkeeper Augusto Batalla, among others. After the resignation of Gerardo Martino as coach, Julio Olarticoechea (who was the Argentina U-20 coach) was appointed to take over the team.

At Rio 2016, the squad debuted with a 2–0 loss to Portugal, then defeating Algeria 2–1. In the last fixture of group stage, Argentina drew 1–1 with Honduras, which caused the squad finished third in the group, not enough to qualify for the next round. Some of Argentina's players were Ángel Correa, Jonathan Calleri and Cristian Pavón.

In Tokyo 2020, Argentina debuted in group C with a 2–0 loss to Australia, then beating Egypt 1–0. The team tied 1–1 to Spain, finishing third in the group and failing to qualify to the next stage. Fernando Batista was the head coach. Like the previous edition in Rio, several clubs denied their players to play for Argentina, some examples were Gonzalo Montiel, Cristian Romero, Exequiel Palacios, Lautaro Martínez, Julián Álvarez, Lisandro Martínez, Nicolás Domínguez, Nicolás González, and Nahuel Molina (went on vacation after playing the 2019 Copa América); on the other hand, footballers playing for teams outside Argentine were not also allowed to play, such as Matías Zaracho, Nicolás Capaldo, Juan Foyth, Marcos Senesi, and Leonardo Balerdi. The large list of players denied also included over-23 players Carlos Izquierdoz, Enzo Pérez, Ángel Correa, Nacho Fernández, Sebastián Driussi, Agustín Marchesín, and Juan Musso.

== Rivalries ==
=== Brazil ===
The Argentina and Brazil national football teams are sporting rivals.

== Results and fixtures ==
The following matches have been played within the past 12 months.

Win Draw Loss

== Coaching staff ==
As of 24 March 2024.

Position	Name
Head coach	(Argentina) Javier Mascherano
Assistant coach	(Argentina) Lucas Pagano
Assistant coach	(Argentina) Leandro Stillitano
Fitness coach	(Argentina) Pablo Blanco
Goalkeeping coach	(Argentina) Mauro Dobler

== Players ==
=== Current squad ===
The following players were called-up for the 2024 Olympics.

- Caps and goals correct as of 22 July 2024. - source: Official web

No.	Pos.	Player	Date of birth (age)	Caps	Goals	Club
1	GK	Gerónimo Rulli	20 May 1992 (age 34)			(French Football Federation) Marseille
12	GK	Leandro Brey	21 September 2002 (age 24)			(Argentine Football Association) Boca Juniors
2	DF	Marco Di Cesare	30 January 2002 (age 24)			(Argentine Football Association) Racing
3	DF	Julio Soler	16 February 2005 (age 21)			(Argentine Football Association) Lanús
4	DF	Joaquín García	20 August 2001 (age 25)			(Argentine Football Association) Vélez Sarsfield
6	DF	Bruno Amione	3 January 2002 (age 24)			(Mexican Football Federation) Santos Laguna
13	DF	Gonzalo Luján	27 April 2001 (age 25)			(United States Soccer Federation) Inter Miami
16	DF	Nicolás Otamendi	12 February 1988 (age 38)			(Portuguese Football Federation) Benfica
5	MF	Ezequiel Fernández	25 July 2002 (age 24)			(Saudi Arabian Football Federation) Al-Qadsiah
7	MF	Kevin Zenón	30 July 2001 (age 25)			(Argentine Football Association) Boca Juniors
8	MF	Cristian Medina	1 June 2002 (age 24)			(Argentine Football Association) Boca Juniors
10	MF	Thiago Almada	26 April 2001 (age 25)			(Royal Spanish Football Federation) Atlético Madrid
11	MF	Claudio Echeverri	2 January 2006 (age 20)			(German Football Association) Bayer Leverkusen
14	MF	Santiago Hezze	22 October 2001 (age 25)			(Hellenic Football Federation) Olympiacos
9	FW	Julián Alvarez	31 January 2000 (age 26)			(Royal Spanish Football Federation) Atlético Madrid
15	FW	Luciano Gondou	22 June 2001 (age 25)			(Russian Football Union) Zenit Saint Petersburg
17	FW	Giuliano Simeone	18 December 2002 (age 23)			(Royal Spanish Football Federation) Atlético Madrid
18	FW	Lucas Beltrán	29 March 2001 (age 25)			(Italian Football Federation) Fiorentina

=== Top goalscorers in Olympic Games ===
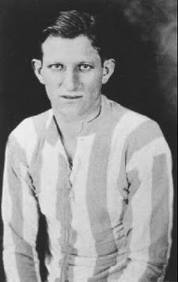
Domingo Tarasconi, all-time top scorer in Olympic Games with 11 goals in the 1928 edition

Rank.	Player	Games	Goals	Matches
1	Domingo Tarasconi	1928	11	5
2	Carlos Tevez	2004	8	6
3	Manuel Ferreira	1928	6	5
3	Hernán Crespo	1996	6	6
4	Juan Oleniak	1960	4	3
4	Roberto Cherro	1928	4	5
5	Carlos Alfaro Moreno	1988	3	4

=== Overage players in Olympic Games ===
Tournament	Player 1	Player 2	Player 3
1996	José Chamot (DF)	Roberto Sensini (DF)	Diego Simeone (MF)
2004	Roberto Ayala (DF)	Gabriel Heinze (DF)	Kily González (MF)
2008	Nicolás Pareja (DF)	Javier Mascherano (MF)	Juan Román Riquelme (MF)
2016	Gerónimo Rulli (GK)	Víctor Cuesta (DF)	did not select
2020	Jeremías Ledesma (GK)	did not select	
2024	Gerónimo Rulli (GK)	Nicolás Otamendi (DF)	Julián Álvarez (FW)

== Competitive record ==
=== Olympic Games ===
Rules

- 1900–1904: club teams
- 1908–1984: amateur / youth national teams (Note: the 1924 and 1928 editions were co-organised with FIFA) (Note: Countries from Eastern Europe competed with professional players.)
- 1988: professional players who had not played in FIFA World Cup
- 1992: under-23 national teams
- 1996–present: under-23 national teams (with three 'no age limit' players allowed, after an agreement between FIFA and OIC)

Clarification notes

- No South American teams competed between 1904–1920
- The 1928 edition was played with the Senior squad
- As no tournament was held in 1932, no records are included

Olympic Games record
Year	Host	Round	Pos.	Pld.	W	D	L	GF	GA	Squad
1952	(Finland) Helsinki	Did not participate								
1956	(Australia) Melbourne	Did not participate								
1960	(Italy) Rome	Group stage	7th	3	2	0	1	6	4	Squad
1964	(Japan) Tokyo	Group stage	10th	2	0	1	1	3	4	Squad
1968	Mexico	Did not participate (Note: Argentina did not contest the CONMEBOL Pre-Olympic Tournament either.)								
1972	(West Germany) Munich	Did not qualify								
1976	(Canada) Montreal	Did not qualify								
1980	(Soviet Union) Moscow	Qualified, but did not participate (Note: Although Argentina had qualified to the Games and the COA had also announced the participation, any athlete from the country attended the Olympics. Venezuela replaced Argentina at the competition.)								
1984	(United States) Los Angeles	Did not participate								
1988	(South Korea) Seoul	Quarter-finals	8th	4	1	1	2	4	5	Squad
1992	(Spain) Barcelona	Did not qualify								
1996	(United States) Atlanta	Silver medalists	2nd place, silver medalist(s)	6	3	2	1	13	6	Squad
2000	(Australia) Sydney	Did not qualify								
2004	(Greece) Athens	Gold medalists	1st place, gold medalist(s)	6	6	0	0	17	0	Squad
2008	(China) Beijing	Gold medalists	1st place, gold medalist(s)	6	6	0	0	11	2	Squad
2012	(United Kingdom) London	Did not qualify								
2016	(Brazil) Rio de Janeiro	Group stage	11th	3	1	1	1	3	4	Squad
2020	(Japan) Tokyo	Group stage	10th	3	1	1	1	2	3	Squad
2024	(France) Paris	Quarter-finals	7th	4	2	0	2	6	4	Squad
Total		10/18	2–1–0	37	22	6	9	65	32	–

== Other competitions ==
=== CONMEBOL Pre-Olympic Tournament ===
CONMEBOL Pre-Olympic Tournament record
Year	Host	Pos.	Pld.	W	D	L	GF	GA
1960	Peru	1st place, gold medalist(s)	6	6	0	0	25	6
1964	Peru	1st place, gold medalist(s)	5	5	0	0	11	1
1968	Colombia	Did not participate						
1971	Colombia	3rd place, bronze medalist(s)	7	1	5	1	7	6
1976	Brazil	3rd place, bronze medalist(s)	5	2	1	2	7	8
1980	Colombia	1st place, gold medalist(s)	6	5	1	0	13	2
1984	Ecuador	Did not participate						
1987	Bolivia	2nd place, silver medalist(s)	7	3	3	1	8	2
1992	Paraguay	5	4	2	1	1	4	3
1996	Argentina	2nd place, silver medalist(s)	7	6	1	0	21	3
2000	Brazil	3rd place, bronze medalist(s)	7	3	1	3	12	9
2004	Chile	1st place, gold medalist(s)	7	5	2	0	16	8
2020	Colombia	1st place, gold medalist(s)	7	6	0	1	14	8
2024	Venezuela	2nd place, silver medalist(s)	7	3	4	0	17	9
Total		5–3–3	75	47	19	9	155	65

=== Pan American Games ===
Rules (CONMEBOL)

- 1951–1983: amateur senior teams
- 1987–1995: youth teams
- 1999: under-23 teams
- 2003: under-20 teams
- 2007: under-17 teams plus 3 no-age-limit players
- 2011–present: under-22 teams plus 3 no-age-limit players

Pan American Games record
Year	Host	Round	Pos.	Pld.	W	D	L	GF	GA	Squad
1951	(Argentina) Buenos Aires	Gold medalists	1st place, gold medalist(s)	4	4	0	0	16	2	–
1955	Mexico City	Gold medalists	1st place, gold medalist(s)	6	5	1	0	23	7	–
1959	(United States) Chicago	Gold medalists	1st place, gold medalist(s)	6	5	1	0	20	4	–
1963	(Brazil) São Paulo	Silver medalists	2nd place, silver medalist(s)	4	2	2	0	11	3	–
1967	(Canada) Winnipeg	Group stage	5th	3	1	1	1	7	3	–
1971	(Colombia) Cali	Gold medalists	1st place, gold medalist(s)	5	4	1	0	7	2	–
1975	Mexico City	Bronze medalists	3rd place, bronze medalist(s)	6	3	1	0	19	1	–
1979	(Puerto Rico) San Juan	Bronze medalists	3rd place, bronze medalist(s)	5	4	1	0	9	0	–
1983	(Venezuela) Caracas	Group stage	2	0	0	2	0	4	–	
1987	(United States) Indianapolis	Bronze medalists	3rd place, bronze medalist(s)	3	3	0	0	9	0	–
1991	(Cuba) Havana	Did not participate due to CONMEBOL boycott								
1995	(Argentina) Mar del Plata	Gold medalists	1st place, gold medalist(s)	5	3	0	1	10	4	–
1999	(Canada) Winnipeg	Did not qualify								
2003	(Dominican Republic) Santo Domingo	Gold medalists (Note: CONMEBOL teams (included Argentina) played with U-20 squads.)	1st place, gold medalist(s)	5	5	0	0	10	5	–
2007	(Brazil) Rio de Janeiro	Group stage (Note: CONMEBOL teams (included Argentina) played with U-17 squads.)	9th	3	0	2	1	1	3	–
2011	(Mexico) Guadalajara	Silver medalists	2nd place, silver medalist(s)	5	3	1	1	6	2	Squad
2015	(Canada) Toronto	Did not qualify								
2019	(Peru) Lima	Gold medalists	1st place, gold medalist(s)	5	4	0	1	14	6	Squad
2023	(Chile) Santiago	Did not qualify								
Total		15/19	7–2–3	65	43	13	5	166	42	–

== Honours ==
- Summer Olympics
  - (gold) Gold Medal (2): 2004, 2008
  - (silver) Silver Medal (1): 1996
- CONMEBOL Pre-Olympic Tournament
  - (gold) Gold medal (5): 1960, 1964, 1980, 2004, 2020
  - (silver) Silver medal (3): 1987, 1996, 2024
  - (bronze) Bronze medal (3): 1971, 1976, 2000
- Pan American Games
  - (gold) Gold medal (7): 1951, 1955, 1959, 1975, 1995, 2003, 2019
  - (silver) Silver medal (2): 1963, 2011
  - (bronze) Bronze medal (3): 1975, 1979, 1987

== See also ==
- Argentina national under-20 football team
- Argentina national under-17 football team
- Argentina national under-15 football team
- Argentina national football team
- Argentina national futsal team
