= Vítor (footballer, born 1959) =

Brazilian footballer

Personal information
- Full name: Vítor Luís Pereira da Silva
- Date of birth: 4 November 1959 (age 66)
- Place of birth: Miguel Pereira, Brazil
- Position: Defensive midfielder

Youth career
- –1978: Flamengo

Senior career*
Years	Team	Apps	(Gls)
1978–1983	Flamengo	136	(5)
1984	Atlético Mineiro	31	(5)
1985–1987	Vasco da Gama		
1987–1989	Botafogo		
1989–1990	Fluminense	24	(0)
1990–1991	Portimonense	10	(1)
1992	Inter de Lages		
1993–1994	Rio Branco-ES		
1994–1997	Campo Grande-RJ		

International career
1979–1984	Brazil Olympic	17	(5)
1981	Brazil U20		
1981–1982	Brazil	3	(0)
Medal record
Men's Football
Representing Brazil
Pan American Games
Winner	1979 San Juan
- * Club domestic league appearances and goals

Vítor Luís Pereira da Silva (born 4 November 1959), simply known as Vítor, is a Brazilian former professional footballer who played as a defensive midfielder.

== Club career ==
Vítor began his career at Flamengo, a club where he managed to achieve great success, sharing in the achievements of the early 1980s. In 1983, with Andrade injury, he was a fundamental player in the Brazilian title. He earned the nickname "Beckenbauer de Portela" due to his style of play. During his career, he managed to play for the four main clubs in Rio de Janeiro, being Rio champion at Vasco and Botafogo. He ended his career at Campo Grande AC in the 1990s.

== International career ==
Vítor was part of the Olympic team of Brazil in 1979, being champion of the San Juan Pan American Games, and of the 1980 CONMEBOL Pre-Olympic Tournament this time without repeating the success and not qualifying for Moscow. He remained on the Olympic team until 1984, helping to win the 1984 CONMEBOL Pre-Olympic Tournament.

In 1981, Vítor was part of the champion squad of the Toulon Tournament.

For Brazil A team, played in three friendly matches: against France and West Germany in 1981, and again versus West Germany in 1982.

== Personal life ==
He became a farmer in Miguel Pereira when retired. Vítor also got involved in politics, running for office a few times and as sports secretary.

== Honours ==
Flamengo

- Intercontinental Cup: 1981
- Copa Libertadores: 1981
- Campeonato Brasileiro: 1980, 1982, 1983
- Campeonato Carioca: 1981
- Taça Guanabara: 1980, 1981, 1982
- Ramón de Carranza Trophy: 1980

Vasco da Gama

- Campeonato Carioca: 1987

Botafogo

- Campeonato Carioca: 1989

Brazil Olympic

- Pan American Games: (gold) 1979
- CONMEBOL Pre-Olympic Tournament: 1984

Brazil U20

- Toulon Tournament: 1981
