= Leiz =

Brazilian footballer

Personal information
- Full name: Leiz Antônio Mendes Cunha
- Date of birth: 27 June 1958 (age 68)
- Place of birth: Uberaba, Brazil
- Position: Centre-back

Youth career
- Juventus-SP

Senior career*
| Years | Team | Apps | (Gls) |
| 1977–1983 | Juventus-SP | | |
| 1983–1984 | Portuguesa | 82 | (5) |
| 1985–1986 | Botafogo | | |
| 1987–1988 | Botafogo-SP | | |
| 1988–1991 | Nacional da Madeira | | |

International career
| 1983 | Brazil U20 | | |
| 1983–1984 | Brazil Olympic | 9 | (1) |
- * Club domestic league appearances and goals as of 27 November 2023

Leiz Antônio Mendes Cunha (born 27 June 1958), better known as Leiz, is a Brazilian former professional footballer who played as a centre-back.

== Career ==
Leiz began his career at CA Juventus and also played for Portuguesa de Desportos, Botafogo FR, Botafogo FC and CD Nacional.

== Internacional career ==
Leiz was part of the Brazil national team squad that competed in the 1983 Copa América and was runners-up. He was also part of the under-20 team at the Toulon tournament and the 1984 Pre-Olympic Tournament champion team.

== Honours ==
Brazil U20

- Toulon Tournament: 1983

Brazil Olympic

- CONMEBOL Pre-Olympic Tournament: 1984
