= Marcus Vinícius (footballer, born 1963) =

Brazilian footballer

Personal information
- Full name: Marcus Vinícius do Nascimento
- Date of birth: 17 June 1963 (age 63)
- Place of birth: Belo Horizonte, Brazil
- Height: 1.77 m (5 ft 10 in)
- Position: Forward

Youth career
- 1977–1983: Atlético Mineiro

Senior career*
Years	Team	Apps	(Gls)
1980–1987	Atlético Mineiro	120	(31)
1985	→ Flamengo (loan)	5	(0)
1988	São José-SP		
1988–1989	Grêmio	37	(8)
1989	Sport Recife		
1989	Palmeiras	8	(0)
1990	São José-SP		
1991	Sport Recife		
1991	São José-SP		

International career
1983	Brazil U20		
1983–1984	Brazil Olympic	9	(2)
Medal record
Men's football
Representing Brazil
Pan American Games
Silver medal – second place	1983 Caracas	Team
- * Club domestic league appearances and goals as of 24 November 2023

Marcus Vinícius do Nascimento (born 17 June 1963), simply known as Marcus Vinicius, is a Brazilian former professional footballer who played as a forward.

== Career ==
Marcus Vinícius began his career in the youth sectors of Atlético Mineiro, being top scorer in the baby tooth category. In the main team, he debuted in 1980, but due to fluctuations he was little used in the first few years. He was part of the squads that won the state championship in 1985 and 1986. He also played for Flamengo, São José-SP, Palmeiras, Grêmio and Sport.

== International career ==
In 1983, Marcus Vinícius was part of the Brazil under-20 team that won the Toulon Tournament. In the same year, he was also part of the Olympic team of Brazil, who was silver medal in the Caracas Pan American Games. He was also part of the 1984 CONMEBOL Pre-Olympic Tournament winning squad.

== Honours ==
Brazil U20

- Toulon Tournament: 1983

Brazil Olympic

- Pan American Games: (silver) 1983
- CONMEBOL Pre-Olympic Tournament: 1984

Atlético Mineiro

- Campeonato Mineiro: 1985, 1986

Grêmio

- Campeonato Gaúcho: 1989

Sport Recife

- Campeonato Pernambucano: 1991
