= Silva (footballer, born 1958) =

Brazilian footballer (1958–2026)

Personal information
- Full name: Luís Carlos da Silva Matos
- Date of birth: 14 August 1958
- Place of birth: Rio de Janeiro, Brazil
- Date of death: 11 May 2026 (aged 67)
- Place of death: Niterói, Rio de Janeiro, Brazil
- Position: Forward

Youth career
- –1978: Botafogo

Senior career*
Years	Team	Apps	(Gls)
1978–1982	Botafogo		
1981	→ Vitória (loan)		
1982	→ América-RN (loan)		
1983	América-RN		
1983–1984	ABC		
1985–1986	Fortaleza		
1987	América-RN		
1988	Ferroviário		
1989	Rio Branco-SP		
1992	Sobradinho		
1993	Gama		

International career
1979–1980	Brazil Olympic	11	(5)
Medal record
Men's Football
Representing Brazil
Pan American Games
Winner	1979 San Juan
- * Club domestic league appearances and goals

Luís Carlos da Silva Matos (14 August 1958 – 11 May 2026), better known as Silva, was a Brazilian professional footballer who played as a forward.

== Club career ==
A standout in Botafogo's youth sectors, he played for the club in the early 80s. On loan, he was successful in football in Rio Grande do Norte, both for América de Natal and ABC. He was also Ceará champion with Fortaleza in 1985. He ended his career in the early 90s, in football in the Federal District.

== International career ==
Silva was part of the Olympic team of Brazil in 1979, being champion of the San Juan Pan American Games, being one of the competition's top scorers, and of the 1980 CONMEBOL Pre-Olympic Tournament this time without repeating the success and not qualifying for Moscow.

== Death ==
Silva died in Niterói on 11 May 2026, at the age of 67.

== Honours ==
América de Natal

- Campeonato Potiguar: 1982, 1987

ABC

- Campeonato Potiguar: 1983, 1984

Fortaleza

- Campeonato Cearense: 1985

Botafogo youth

- Campeonato Carioca Sub-20: 1977, 1978

Rio de Janeiro youth

- Campeonato Brasileiro de Seleções Júnior: 1978

Brazil Olympic

- Pan American Games: (gold) 1979

Individual

- 1979 Pan American Games top scorer: 4 goals
