= Mica (footballer, born 1958) =

Brazilian footballer

Personal information
- Full name: Dalmir Vargas Estigarribia
- Date of birth: 29 July 1958
- Place of birth: Tupanciretã, Brazil
- Date of death: 24 June 2019 (aged 60)
- Place of death: União da Vitória, Brazil
- Position: Forward

Youth career
- Lansul (Esteio)

Senior career*
Years	Team	Apps	(Gls)
1978–1980	Internacional		
1980	Inter de Lages		
1980	Sampaio Corrêa		
1981–1982	Criciúma	81	(10)
1983	Figueirense		
1984	Inter de Lages		
1985	Hercílio Luz		
1986	Próspera		
1986–1987	AA Iguaçu		
1988	Operário Ferroviário		
1989	Canoinhas-SC		
1989–1991	AA Iguaçu		

International career
1979–1980	Brazil Olympic	8	(2)

Managerial career
- 2019: AA Iguaçu (U17)
Medal record
Men's Football
Representing Brazil
Pan American Games
Winner	1979 San Juan
- * Club domestic league appearances and goals as of 23 November 2023

Dalmir Vargas Estigarribia (29 July 1958 – 24 June 2019), better known as Mica, was a Brazilian professional footballer and manager who played as a forward.

== Career ==
Revealed by Lansul de Esteio, he was hired by Internacional, where he won the 1978 Copa São Paulo de Futebol Jr.. He played for several other clubs in the country, with emphasis on Criciúma and AA Iguaçu.

== International career ==
Mica was part of the Olympic team of Brazil in 1979, being champion of the San Juan Pan American Games, and of the 1980 CONMEBOL Pre-Olympic Tournament this time without repeating the success and not qualifying for Moscow.

== Honours ==
Internacional

- Copa São Paulo de Futebol Jr.: 1978

Brazil Olympic

- Pan American Games: (gold) 1979

AA Iguaçu

- Campeonato Paranaense Série Prata: 1987, 1991

== Death ==
While a coach of the AA Iguaçu U17 team in 2019, Mica suffered a massive heart attack during a training session. He was buried in the Maratá Cemetery, in União da Vitória.
