= Jerson =

Jerson is a given name. Notable people with the name include:

- Jérson (footballer), Jérson Garcia da Conceição (born 1959), Brazilian footballer
- Jerson Cabral (born 1991), Dutch footballer
- Jerson Monteiro (born 1985), professional soccer player
- Jerson Ravelo (born 1977), boxer from the Dominican Republic
- Jerson Ribeiro (born 1988), Dutch footballer of Cape Verdian descent offensive midfielder
- Jerson Tegete (born 1988), Tanzanian footballer
- Jerson Fernandes (born 1985), Popular Chef of India
