= Jérson (footballer) =

Brazilian footballer

Personal information
- Full name: Jérson Garcia da Conceição
- Date of birth: 11 June 1959 (age 67)
- Place of birth: Rio de Janeiro, Brazil
- Position: Midfielder

Youth career
- –1976: Bonsucesso
- 1977–1978: Botafogo

Senior career*
Years	Team	Apps	(Gls)
1977–1983	Botafogo	137	(19)
1982	→ Vasco da Gama (loan)		
1984	Inter de Limeira		
1984–1986	Portuguesa		
1987	Olaria		
1988–1989	Atlético Goianiense		
1990	Vila Nova		
1991–1992	Paysandu		
1992	São José-SP		
1993	Novo Horizonte-GO		

International career
1979–1980	Brazil Olympic	17	(3)
Medal record
Men's Football
Representing Brazil
Pan American Games
Winner	1979 San Juan
- * Club domestic league appearances and goals as of 24 November 2023

Jérson Garcia da Conceição (born 11 June 1959), simply known as Jérson, is a Brazilian former professional footballer who played as a midfielder.

== Career ==
Revealed at Bonsucesso, he arrived at Botafogo where he was Rio youth champion. He made 137 appearances and scored 19 goals for the club. In 1982 he was loaned to Vasco da Gama, where he was part of the Rio champion squad that year.

He also had spells at Inter de Limeira, Portuguesa and Olaria, until arriving at Atlético Goianiense, where he was champion of Goiás in 1988. Jérson was also part of the 1991 Série B champion squad with Paysandu.

== International career ==
Jérson was part of the Olympic team of Brazil in 1979, being champion of the San Juan Pan American Games, and of the 1980 CONMEBOL Pre-Olympic Tournament this time without repeating the success and not qualifying for Moscow.

== Honours ==
=== Brazil ===
Brazil Olympic

- Pan American Games: (gold) 1979

=== Clubs ===
Vasco da Gama

- Campeonato Carioca: 1982

Atlético Goianiense

- Campeonato Goiano: 1988

Paysandu

- Campeonato Brasileiro Série B: 1991

=== Youth ===
Botafogo

- Campeonato Carioca Sub-20: 1978

Rio de Janeiro

- Campeonato Brasileiro de Seleções Júnior: 1978
