= Picolé (footballer) =

Brazilian footballer (born 1956)

Personal information
- Full name: José Manoel Ricardo
- Date of birth: 29 January 1956 (age 70)
- Place of birth: Pirajuí, Brazil
- Height: 1.78 m (5 ft 10 in)
- Position: Forward

Youth career
- –1975: Noroeste

Senior career*
Years	Team	Apps	(Gls)
1975–1976	Noroeste		
1976–1979	Palmeiras	59	(12)
1979–1981	Puebla		
1981–1982	Deportivo Neza		
1982	Taubaté		
1983	Atlético Paranaense		
1984	Grêmio Maringá		
1985–1988	Puebla		
1988	Passo Fundo		

International career
1975–1976	Brazil Olympic	3	(0)

Managerial career
- 2008: Juventus-SC
- 2014: Tanabi
- 2019–2020: São-Carlense (U20)
- * Club domestic league appearances and goals as of 27 October 2023

José Manoel Ricardo (born 29 January 1956), better known as Picolé, is a Brazilian former professional footballer who played as a forward.

== Career ==
Revealed by the EC Noroeste, he stood out to the point that he was part of some friendlies aimed at the 1976 Summer Olympics, but was not called-up in the final list. From 1976 to 1979, played for Palmeiras where he appeared in 59 games and scored 12 goals. He also played in Mexican football, for Club Puebla and Deportivo Neza.

== Managerial career ==
In 2008 he was the coach of GE Juventus de Jaraguá do Sul. He also coached Tanabi in 2014 and São-Carlense in the 2019 Copa São Paulo de Futebol Jr.

He currently works for São Paulo FC, at a football school in Palmas, Tocantins.
