= Anselmo (footballer, born 1959) =

Brazilian footballer

Personal information
- Full name: José Antônio Cardoso Anselmo Pereira
- Date of birth: 20 March 1959 (age 67)
- Place of birth: Nova Friburgo, Brazil
- Height: 1.89 m (6 ft 2 in)
- Position: Forward

Youth career
- Flamengo

Senior career*
Years	Team	Apps	(Gls)
1978–1982	Flamengo	37	(12)
1982	Comercial-SP		
1983	Botafogo-SP		
1984–1985	Ceará		
1986	Coritiba		
1987	Cascavel EC		
1988–1990	Louletano		
1989	→ Sport Recife (loan)		

International career
1979–1980	Brazil Olympic	7	(6)
- * Club domestic league appearances and goals as of 6 November 2023

José Antônio Cardoso Anselmo Pereira (born 20 March 1959), simply known as Anselmo, is a Brazilian former professional footballer who played as a forward.

== Career ==
A striker of good height, he was trained in Flamengo's youth categories and participated in the club's achievements at the beginning of the 1980s. He made his mark in the history of Flamengo in the 1981 Copa Libertadores finals, where he entered the field as a substitute with a single purpose: punching Mario Soto, a CD Cobreloa defender, who, according to Flamengo players, even used a rock to attack them during the match in Santiago.

== Honours ==
Flamengo

- Intercontinental Cup: 1981
- Copa Libertadores: 1981
- Campeonato Brasileiro: 1980, 1982
- Campeonato Carioca: 1979, 1981
- Taça Guanabara: 1980

Ceará

- Campeonato Cearense: 1984

Coritiba

- Campeonato Paranaense: 1986
