= Jarbas (footballer) =

Brazilian footballer

Personal information
- Full name: Jarbas Tomazoli Nunes
- Date of birth: 17 September 1957 (age 69)
- Place of birth: São Paulo, Brazil
- Height: 1.75 m (5 ft 9 in)
- Position: Forward

Senior career*
Years	Team	Apps	(Gls)
- America

International career
- Brazil Olympic
- * Club domestic league appearances and goals

Jarbas Tomazoli Nunes (born 17 September 1957), known as just Jarbas, is a Brazilian former footballer who played as a forward. He competed in the men's tournament at the 1976 Summer Olympics.
