= Erivelto (footballer, born 1954) =

Brazilian footballer

Erivélto
Personal information
- Full name: Erivélton Martins
- Date of birth: 10 July 1954 (age 72)
- Place of birth: Rio de Janeiro, Brazil
- Height: 1.71 m (5 ft 7 in)
- Position: Midfielder

International career
Years	Team	Apps	(Gls)
- Brazil Olympic

Erivélton Martins (born 10 July 1954), known as Erivélto, is a Brazilian former footballer who played as a midfielder. He competed in the men's tournament at the 1976 Summer Olympics.
