= Darcy (footballer, born 1955) =

Brazilian footballer (1955–2024)

Personal information
- Full name: Darcy Requi Florêncio
- Date of birth: 26 May 1955
- Place of birth: Cafelândia, São Paulo, Brazil
- Date of death: 7 September 2024 (aged 69)
- Place of death: Campinas, São Paulo, Brazil
- Position: Left winger

Youth career
- Guarani

Senior career*
Years	Team	Apps	(Gls)
1973–1975	Guarani		
1976	América-SP		
1976	XV de Jaú		
1977–1978	Sport Recife		
1978	Portuguesa		
1979–1980	XV de Jaú		
1982	Inter de Bebedouro		
1983	Capivariano		
- * Club domestic league appearances and goals as of 7 September 2024

Darcy Requi Florêncio (26 May 1955 – 7 September 2024), simply known as Darcy, was a Brazilian professional footballer who played as a left winger.

== Career ==
Revealed in the youth sectors of Guarani, Darcy played as a left winger, most notably his spells at XV de Jaú, Sport Recife and Portuguesa.

== Death ==
Darcy died from cancer on 7 September 2024, in the city of Campinas, where he had lived since retirement. He was 69.

== Honours ==
XV de Jaú

- Campeonato Paulista Série A2: 1976

Sport Recife

- Campeonato Pernambucano: 1977
