= 1976 CONMEBOL Pre-Olympic Tournament =

Tournament details
- Host country: Brazil
- Teams: 6

Final positions
- Champions: Brazil
- Runners-up: Uruguay
- Third place: Argentina
- Fourth place: Colombia

The 1976 CONMEBOL Pre-Olympic Tournament was the 5th CONMEBOL Pre-Olympic Tournament.

Bolivia, Ecuador, Paraguay and Venezuela did not participate.

Brazil and Uruguay qualified for the 1976 Summer Olympics.

== Group stage ==
Pos	Team	Pld	W	D	L	GF	GA	GD	Pts	Qualification
1	Brazil (Q)	5	4	1	0	12	2	+10	9	1976 Summer Olympics
2	Uruguay (Note: Uruguay withdrew following completion of the tournament.)	5	2	3	0	9	4	+5	7	1976 Summer Olympics
3	Argentina (Note: Argentina were represented by club side Newell's Old Boys. Argentina were offered a position in the Summer Olympics following Uruguay's withdrawal but declined the invitation. Cuba were awarded the position at the Olympics.)	5	2	1	2	7	8	−1	5	
4	Colombia	5	1	2	2	5	9	−4	4	
5	Chile	5	1	1	3	5	7	−2	3	
6	Peru	5	1	0	4	3	11	−8	2	

(Q) Qualified for the phase indicated
Notes:
21 January 1976

Brazil	1–1	Uruguay

21 January 1976

Colombia	0–1	Peru

21 January 1976

Argentina	2–1	Chile

24 January 1976

Argentina	3–1	Peru

24 January 1976

Brazil	4–0	Colombia

24 January 1976

Uruguay	1–1	Chile

27 January 1976

Uruguay	3–0	Peru

27 January 1976

Brazil	2–1	Chile

27 January 1976

Argentina	2–2	Colombia

29 January 1976

Uruguay	2–0	Argentina

29 January 1976

Brazil	3–0	Peru

29 January 1976

Colombia	1–0	Chile

1 February 1976

Chile	2–1	Peru

1 February 1976

Uruguay	2–2	Colombia

1 February 1976

Brazil	2–0	Argentina
