= CONMEBOL Pre-Olympic Tournament =

South American association football event

CONMEBOL Preolímpico
- Organizer(s): CONMEBOL
- Founded: 1960; 65 years ago
- Region: South America
- Qualifier for: Summer Olympics
- Current champion: Paraguay (2nd title)
- Most championships: Brazil (7 titles)
- Website: conmebol.com/preolimpico

The CONMEBOL Preolímpico (English: Pre-Olympic Tournament) is an international association football event in the South America region organized by CONMEBOL. It is the qualification tournament for the football tournament at the Olympic Games.

In 1960, teams from North and Central America also entered the tournament. Before 1984, only junior or non-professional players were allowed to participate. In 1987 the competition opened to any player who had not played in World Cup (whether a qualifying match or at the final tournament). Due to an International Olympic Committee ruling, since 1992, male competitors have been required to be under 23 years old, and since 1996, a maximum of three over-23-year-old players have been allowed per squad.

The tournament was not held between 2007 and 2015, as the South American Youth Championship was chosen as the qualifying tournament for the Olympic Games. The competition was re-introduced for the 2020 games.

== Results ==
Keys

Teams qualified for the Olympics:

- 1960: Champion, runner-up and third place.
- 1964–present: Champion and runner-up

Ed.	Year	Host	Final Standings				Num. teams
Ed.	Year	Host	(gold) Champion	(silver) Runner-up	(bronze) Third	Fourth	Num. teams
1	1960	Peru	Argentina	Peru	Brazil	Mexico	10 (Note: This edition was contested by Conmebol and Concacaf teams (6 and 4, respectively), which played against in second round.)
2	1964	Peru	Argentina	Brazil	Peru	Colombia	7
3	1968	Colombia	Brazil	Colombia	Uruguay	Paraguay	8
4	1971	Colombia	Brazil	Colombia	Argentina	Peru	10
5	1976	Brazil	Brazil	Uruguay	Argentina	Colombia	6
6	1980	Colombia	Argentina	Colombia	Peru	Venezuela	7
7	1984	Ecuador	Brazil	Chile	Paraguay	Ecuador	6
8	1987	Bolivia	Brazil	Argentina	Bolivia	Colombia	10
9	1992	Paraguay	Paraguay	Colombia	Uruguay	Ecuador	10
10	1996	Argentina	Brazil	Argentina	Uruguay	Venezuela	10
11	2000	Brazil	Brazil	Chile	Argentina	Uruguay	10
12	2004	Chile	Argentina	Paraguay	Brazil	Chile	10
13	2020	Colombia	Argentina	Brazil	Uruguay	Colombia	10
14	2024	Venezuela	Paraguay	Argentina	Brazil	Venezuela	10

=== Performance by country ===
Team	Titles	Titles years	Runn.	Runners-up years
Brazil	7	1968, 1971, 1976, 1984, 1987, 1996, 2000	2	1964, 2020
Argentina	5	1960, 1964, 1980, 2004, 2020	3	1987, 1996, 2024
Paraguay	2	1992, 2024	1	2004
Colombia	—	—	4	1968, 1971, 1980, 1992
Chile	—	—	2	1984, 2000
Uruguay	—	—	1	1976
Peru	—	—	1	1960
