= 1987 CONMEBOL Pre-Olympic Tournament =

Tournament details
- Host country: Bolivia
- Teams: 10

Final positions
- Champions: Brazil
- Runners-up: Argentina
- Third place: Bolivia
- Fourth place: Colombia

Tournament statistics
- Top scorer(s): Mirandinha; Sergio Salgado (3 goals)

The 1987 CONMEBOL Pre-Olympic Tournament began on 18 April 1987 and ended on 3 May 1987 and was the 8th CONMEBOL Pre-Olympic Tournament.

Brazil and Argentina qualified for the 1988 Summer Olympics.

== Group stage ==
=== Group 1 ===
Pos	Team	Pld	W	D	L	GF	GA	GD	Pts	Qualification
1	Colombia (Q)	4	3	1	0	4	0	+4	7	Final round
2	Brazil (Q)	4	1	2	1	5	5	0	4	Final round
3	Paraguay	4	2	0	2	4	4	0	4	
4	Uruguay	4	1	2	1	2	2	0	4	
5	Peru	4	0	1	3	1	5	−4	1	

(Q) Qualified for the phase indicated
18 April 1987

Colombia	1–0	Peru

18 April 1987

Brazil	3–1	Paraguay

20 April 1987

Uruguay	1–0	Peru

20 April 1987

Colombia	2–0	Brazil

22 April 1987

Paraguay	2–0	Peru

22 April 1987

Colombia	0–0	Uruguay

24 April 1987

Colombia	1–0	Paraguay

24 April 1987

Brazil	1–1	Uruguay

26 April 1987

Paraguay	1–0	Uruguay

26 April 1987

Brazil	1–1	Peru

=== Group 2 ===
Pos	Team	Pld	W	D	L	GF	GA	GD	Pts	Qualification
1	Argentina (Q)	4	2	2	0	6	1	+5	6	Final round
2	Bolivia (Q)	4	3	0	1	5	3	+2	6	Final round
3	Chile	4	2	1	1	6	4	+2	5	
4	Ecuador	4	1	1	2	2	3	−1	3	
5	Venezuela	4	0	0	4	1	9	−8	0	

(Q) Qualified for the phase indicated
19 April 1987

Argentina	1–1	Chile

19 April 1987

Bolivia	3–0	Venezuela

21 April 1987

Argentina	0–0	Ecuador

21 April 1987

Bolivia	1–0	Chile

23 April 1987

Chile	2–1	Ecuador

23 April 1987

Argentina	2–0	Venezuela

25 April 1987

Chile	3–1	Venezuela

25 April 1987

Bolivia	1–0	Ecuador

27 April 1987

Ecuador	1–0	Venezuela

27 April 1987

Argentina	3–0	Bolivia

== Final round ==
Pos	Team	Pld	W	D	L	GF	GA	GD	Pts	Qualification
1	Brazil (Q)	3	2	0	1	4	4	0	4	1988 Summer Olympics
2	Argentina (Q)	3	1	1	1	2	1	+1	3	1988 Summer Olympics
3	Bolivia	3	1	1	1	3	3	0	3	
4	Colombia	3	1	0	2	3	4	−1	2	

(Q) Qualified for the phase indicated
29 April 1987

Brazil	0–2	Argentina

29 April 1987

Bolivia	2–1	Colombia

1 May 1987

Brazil	2–1	Colombia

1 May 1987

Argentina	0–0	Bolivia

3 May 1987

Argentina	0–1	Colombia

3 May 1987

Brazil	2–1	Bolivia
