= 1984 CONMEBOL Pre-Olympic Tournament =

Tournament details
- Host country: Ecuador
- Teams: 6

Final positions
- Champions: Brazil
- Runners-up: Chile
- Third place: Paraguay
- Fourth place: Ecuador

Tournament statistics
- Top scorer: Lucio Ramos (4 goals)

The 1984 CONMEBOL Pre-Olympic Tournament began on 8 February and ended on 21 February 1984 and was the 7th CONMEBOL Pre-Olympic Tournament. Argentina, Bolivia, Peru, and Uruguay did not participate. Brazil and Chile qualified for the 1984 Summer Olympics.

== Group stage ==
=== Group 1 ===
Pos	Team	Pld	W	D	L	GF	GA	GD	Pts	Qualification
1	Ecuador (Q)	2	1	1	0	3	0	+3	3	Final round
2	Brazil (Q)	2	1	1	0	2	1	+1	3	Final round
3	Colombia	2	0	0	2	1	5	−4	0	

(Q) Qualified for the phase indicated

Peru were drawn into Group 1 but withdrew.

8 February 1984

Ecuador	3–0	Colombia

12 February 1984

Brazil	2–1	Colombia

15 February 1984

Ecuador	0–0	Brazil

=== Group 2 ===
Pos	Team	Pld	W	D	L	GF	GA	GD	Pts	Qualification
1	Paraguay (Q)	2	1	1	0	4	0	+4	4	Final round
2	Chile (Q)	2	1	1	0	1	0	+1	4	Final round
3	Venezuela	2	0	0	2	0	5	−5	0	

(Q) Qualified for the phase indicated

Argentina were drawn into Group 2 but withdrew.

8 February 1984

Chile	1–0	Venezuela

12 February 1984

Paraguay	4–0	Venezuela

15 February 1984

Paraguay	0–0	Chile

== Final round ==
Pos	Team	Pld	W	D	L	GF	GA	GD	Pts	Qualification
1	Brazil (Q)	3	3	0	0	7	2	+5	6	1984 Summer Olympics
2	Chile (Q)	3	1	0	2	6	6	0	2	1984 Summer Olympics
3	Paraguay	3	1	0	2	5	7	−2	2	
4	Ecuador	3	1	0	2	3	6	−3	2	

(Q) Qualified for the phase indicated
17 February 1984

Brazil	2–0	Paraguay

17 February 1984

Chile	2–0	Ecuador

19 February 1984

Chile	2–3	Paraguay

19 February 1984

Brazil	2–0	Ecuador

21 February 1984

Brazil	3–2	Chile

21 February 1984

Paraguay	2–3	Ecuador
