= 1980 CONMEBOL Pre-Olympic Tournament =

Tournament details
- Host country: Colombia
- Dates: 23 January — 15 February 1980
- Teams: 7

Final positions
- Champions: Argentina
- Runners-up: Colombia
- Third place: Peru
- Fourth place: Venezuela

The 1980 CONMEBOL Pre-Olympic Tournament began on 23 January and ended on 15 February 1980 and was the 7th CONMEBOL Pre-Olympic Tournament. Ecuador, Paraguay and Uruguay did not participate. Argentina and Colombia qualified for the 1980 Summer Olympics.

Pos	Team	Pld	W	D	L	GF	GA	GD	Pts	Qualification
1	Argentina (Q)	6	5	1	0	13	2	+11	11	1980 Summer Olympics
2	Colombia (Q)	6	3	1	2	10	5	+5	7	1980 Summer Olympics
3	Peru	6	3	1	2	9	7	+2	7	
4	Venezuela	6	2	1	3	7	6	+1	5	
5	Brazil	6	2	1	3	8	12	−4	5	
6	Chile	6	1	2	3	3	5	−2	4	
7	Bolivia	6	1	1	4	3	16	−13	3	

(Q) Qualified for the phase indicated
23 January 1980

Brazil	2–1	Venezuela

Cali
23 January 1980

Chile	2–0	Bolivia

Pereira
24 January 1980

Colombia	2–1	Peru

Bogotá

27 January 1980

Argentina	1–0	Chile

Bogotá
27 January 1980

Peru	3–0	Brazil

Barranquilla
27 January 1980

Colombia	0–1	Venezuela

Cali

30 January 1980

Brazil	4–0	Bolivia

Bogotá
31 January 1980

Colombia	3–1	Chile

Pereira
31 January 1980

Argentina	1–0	Venezuela

Barranquilla

3 February 1980

Argentina	4–1	Peru

Cali
3 February 1980

Venezuela	5–1	Bolivia

Cali
3 February 1980

Brazil	0–0	Chile

Barranquilla

6 February 1980

Peru	1–0	Chile

Cali
6 February 1980

Colombia	0–1	Bolivia

Barranquilla
7 February 1980

Brazil	1–3	Argentina

Bogotá

10 February 1980

Colombia	5–1	Brazil

Cali
10 February 1980

Peru	2–0	Venezuela

Bogotá
10 February 1980

Argentina	4–0	Bolivia

Bogotá

13 February 1980

Chile	0–0	Venezuela

Barranquilla
14 February 1980

Bolivia	1–1	Peru

Pereira
15 February 1980

Argentina	0–0	Colombia

Bogotá
