= Brazil national under-23 football team =

National association football team

Brazil Olympic
- Nickname(s): Seleção Sub-23 (The Selection U-23); Canarinha (Little Canary); Amarelinha (Little Yellow); Verde-Amarela (Green-Yellow)
- Association: Confederação Brasileira de Futebol (Brazilian Football Confederation)
- Confederation: CONMEBOL (South America)
- Head coach: Paulo Victor Gomes
- Most caps: Ronaldinho (27)
- Top scorer: Matheus Cunha (21)
- FIFA code: BRA
First colours	Second colours

First international
- Brazil 5–1 Netherlands (Turku, Finland; 16 July 1952)

Biggest win
- Brazil 14–0 Nicaragua (Mexico City, Mexico; 17 October 1975)

Biggest defeat
- Colombia 5–1 Brazil (Cali, Colombia; 10 February 1980)

Olympic Games
- Appearances: 14 (first in 1952)
- Best result: Gold medalist (2016, 2020)

Pan American Games
- Appearances: 11 (first in 1959)
- Best result: Gold medalist (1963, 1975, 1979, 1987, 2023)
Medal record
Olympic Games
Gold medal – first place	2016 Rio de Janeiro	Team
Gold medal – first place	2020 Tokyo	Team
Silver medal – second place	1984 Los Angeles	Team
Silver medal – second place	1988 Seoul	Team
Silver medal – second place	2012 London	Team
Bronze medal – third place	1996 Atlanta	Team
Bronze medal – third place	2008 Beijing	Team
Pan American Games
Gold medal – first place	1963 São Paulo	Team
Gold medal – first place	1975 Mexico City	Team
Gold medal – first place	1979 San Juan	Team
Gold medal – first place	1987 Indianapolis	Team
Gold medal – first place	2023 Santiago	Team
Silver medal – second place	1959 Chicago	Team
Silver medal – second place	1983 Caracas	Team
Silver medal – second place	2003 Santo Domingo	Team
Bronze medal – third place	2015 Toronto	Team

The Brazil national under-23 football team (Portuguese: Seleção Brasileira de Futebol Sub-23) represents Brazil in international football competitions during Olympic Games and Pan American Games. The selection is limited to players under the age of 23, except three overage players. The team is controlled by the Brazilian Football Confederation (CBF). Brazil U23 is one of the most successful teams in the Olympic football tournament, having won it twice (2016 and 2020) and securing a record total of seven medals, including two golds, three silvers, and two bronzes.

The Olympic football tournament was the last international competition in football organized by FIFA which Brazil had never won, until they captured their first title in 2016. They had previously won three silver medals (1984, 1988, 2012) and two bronze medals (1996, 2008). The team was often coached by the in-charge senior team coach in the past, such as Mário Zagallo in 1996, Vanderlei Luxemburgo in 2000, Dunga in 2008 and Mano Menezes in 2012.

== History ==
=== 1952–1976 Summer Olympics ===
Brazil's first participation in the Olympics was in Helsinki, Finland, in 1952. In that year, Brazil reached the quarter-finals, when they were eliminated by West Germany 4–2. In 1960, in Rome, Italy, in 1964 in Tokyo, Japan, in 1968 in Mexico City, Mexico, and in 1972 in Berlin, West Germany, Brazil was eliminated in the first stage. In Montreal, 1976, Brazil was defeated by Poland 2–0 in the semi-finals, then Brazil was defeated by the Soviet Union 2–0 in the bronze medal match, finishing in the fourth place. In these six participations, Brazil was represented by a team of junior or non-professional players as the Olympics did not allow professional players to participate during this period, all while state-sponsored communist players were allowed to compete.

=== 1984 Summer Olympics – Los Angeles ===
Starting in 1984, professional players were allowed to participate. However, European and South American teams, as traditional football powerhouses that won every single FIFA World Cup, were restricted to players with no more than five "A" caps at the start of the tournament. Brazil won its first medal in 1984, in Los Angeles, United States. In the group stage, Brazil beat Saudi Arabia 3–1, West Germany 1–0 and Morocco 2–0. In the quarter-finals Brazil defeated Canada in the penalty shootout, then they beat Italy 2–1 after extra-time in the semi-finals, but was beaten by France 2–0 in the gold medal Match, thus winning the silver medal.

=== 1988 Summer Olympics – Seoul ===
The second Brazilian silver medal was won in Seoul, South Korea, in 1988. Brazil won the medal after defeating in the group stage Nigeria 4–0, Australia 3–0 and Yugoslavia 2–1. In the quarter-finals Brazil beat their South American rivals Argentina 1–0, then defeated West Germany in the penalty shootout, but was defeated by the Soviet Union 2–1 after extra time in the gold medal match. Romário was the competition's top goal scorer with seven goals.

=== 1996 Summer Olympics – Atlanta ===
Starting in 1992, only players under the age of 23 were allowed to participate, with an exception of three overage players in the team. Brazil, managed by senior team coach, Mário Zagallo, won the bronze medal for the first time in 1996, in Atlanta, United States. In the group stage, Brazil was beaten by Japan 1–0 in the first match, then they beat Hungary 3–1 and Nigeria 1–0, finishing in the group's first position. After beating Ghana 4–2 in the quarter-finals, Brazil was defeated by Nigeria 4–3 after extra time. In the bronze medal match, Brazil beat Portugal 5–0.

=== 2000 Summer Olympics – Sydney ===
Brazil, managed by senior team coach, Vanderlei Luxemburgo, was eliminated in the quarter-finals. In the group stage, Brazil beat by Slovakia 3–1 in the first match, then they were beaten by South Africa 3–1. In the last group match, Brazil beat Japan 1–0 to secure the first position in the group stage. In the quarter-finals, Brazil was beaten by Cameroon 1–2, who later won the gold medal.

=== 2003 CONCACAF Gold Cup ===
In December 2002, CBF appointed Ricardo Gomes as the coach for the Brazil Olympic team who were preparing for the 2004 Olympics. Prior to Olympic qualifying, the Brazil Olympic team or Brazil U23 was sent to compete at the 2003 CONCACAF Gold Cup. Brazil was invited to the tournament and decided to send their Under-23 team, due to their senior team competing a month earlier at the 2003 FIFA Confederations Cup. Although Brazil competed with an U23 team, all the appearances and goals in this tournament were recognized by FIFA as full international caps. The Brazil U23 team advanced all the way to the final, but were defeated by Mexico 0–1 after extra time, denying Brazil the chance to be the first guest team to win the tournament. The following year Brazil failed to qualify for the 2004 Olympic Games after losing out to Paraguay and Argentina in the qualifying tournament.

=== 2008 Summer Olympics – Beijing ===
Brazil, managed by senior team coach, Dunga, finished in the first position in the group stage, ahead of Belgium, New Zealand and China, which they beat 1–0, 5–0 and 3–0 respectively. In the second round, Brazil beat Cameroon 2–0 after extra time. Brazil and Argentina met on August 19 in the semi-final game of the competition. The game was marred by numerous fouls and two ejections for Brazil. Argentina won 3–0. In the bronze medal match, Brazil beat Belgium 3–0.

=== 2012 Summer Olympics – London ===
Before the Games, Brazil beat Great Britain 2–0 in a friendly game.

Brazil, under coach Mano Menezes, was defeated by Mexico 2–1 in the gold medal match, played on 11 August, after beating Egypt, Belarus and New Zealand in the preliminary round, Honduras in the quarter-finals and South Korea in the semi-finals.

=== 2016 Summer Olympics – Rio de Janeiro ===
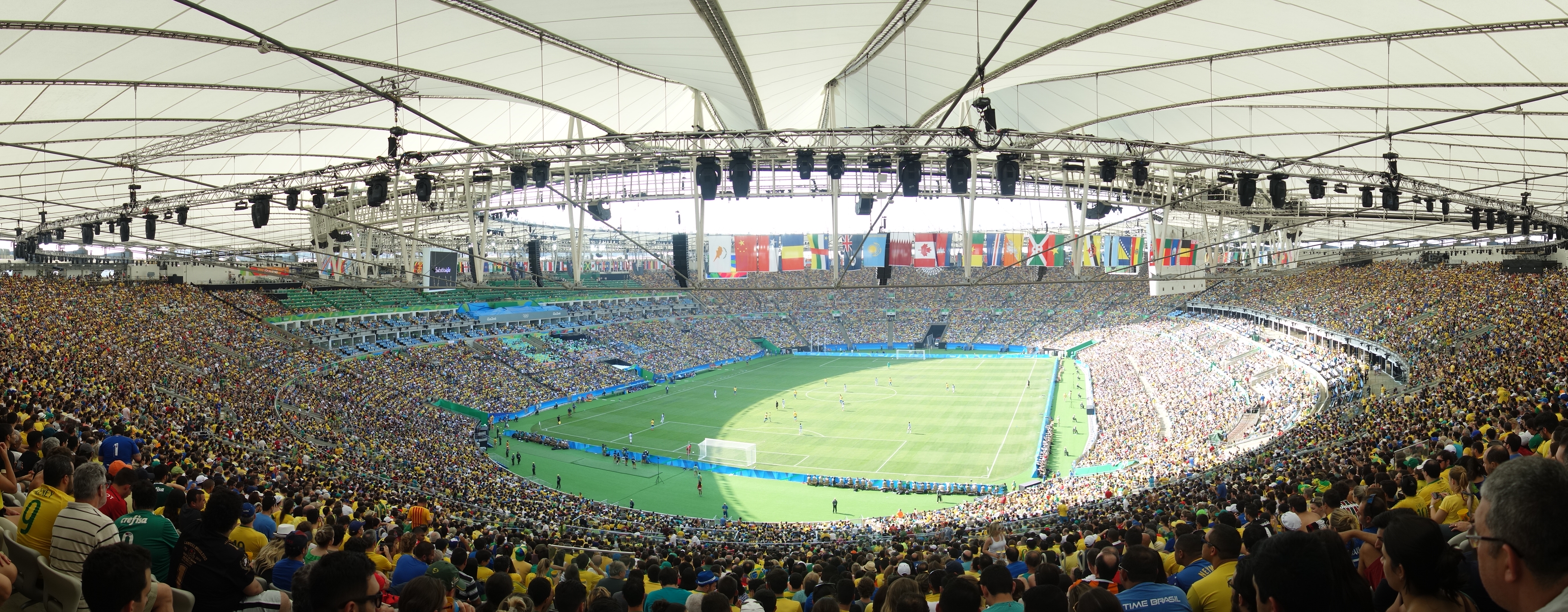
Brazil vs Honduras during the men's football tournament at the 2016 Summer Olympics.

Brazil finished in the first position in the group stage, ahead of Denmark (won 4–0), Iraq (tied 0–0) and South Africa (tied 0–0), with the two latter games were a slumpy start for Brazil. In the second round, Brazil beat Colombia 2–0 and in the semi-final match, Brazil played a one-sided game against Honduras and won 6–0.

In the final against Germany, on 20 August 2016 – the first match between the two teams in any FIFA-sanctioned tournament since the historic 2014 FIFA World Cup semi-final – Brazil edged a 5–4 victory on penalties after a 1–1 draw. Neymar, captaining the side, scored the decisive penalty to win the tournament for the first time ever. Both opposing coaches — Rogerio Micale for Brazil and Horst Hrubesch for Germany — downplayed the fact that the gold medal match was a rematch of the World Cup semi-final, but some fans viewed the Olympic final as a chance for revenge and redemption.

=== 2020 Summer Olympics – Tokyo ===
Brazil qualified for the 2020 Summer Olympics as the runners-up, of the 2020 CONMEBOL Pre-Olympic Tournament in a rather difficult campaign.

In the Olympic tournament finals, Brazil finished at the top of their group with 7 points, following a 4–2 win over Germany, a 0–0 draw to Ivory Coast and a 3–1 win over Saudi Arabia. They beat Egypt 1–0 in the quarter-finals, and Mexico in the semi-finals with a 4–1 victory in the penalty shootouts following a 0–0 draw in extra time. In the final against Spain, Matheus Cunha opened the score for Brazil in the first half and a Mikel Oyarzabal goal in the second half forced the match into extra time; Malcom scored the winning goal in the 108th minute, which lead Brazil to their second Olympic gold medal, consecutively after their first win in Rio five years prior.

Controversially, during the medal ceremony the players did not properly wear Brazil's official Olympic uniform provided by Chinese manufacturer Peak Sport, with the jackets tied around their waists so that their Nike shirts were visible on the podium. This was apparently under orders from the Brazilian Football Confederation, as Nike sponsors their football teams. Other Brazilian athletes complained that the football players were not part of the Olympic team.

== Results and fixtures ==
Win Draw Loss

== Players ==
=== Current squad ===
The following 18 players were called up for the 2023 Pan American Games.

- Caps and goals correct as of 4 November 2023, after the match against Chile.

No.	Pos.	Player	Date of birth (age)	Caps	Goals	Club
1	GK	Mycael	12 March 2004 (aged 19)	4	0	(Brazilian Football Confederation) Athletico Paranaense
12	GK	Andrew	1 July 2001 (aged 22)	1	0	(Brazilian Football Confederation) Flamengo
14	GK	Matheus Donelli	17 May 2002 (aged 21)	1	0	(United Arab Emirates Football Association) Shabab Al-Ahli
2	DF	Miranda	19 January 2000 (aged 23)	5	1	(Brazilian Football Confederation) Operário Ferroviário
3	DF	Michel	20 May 2003 (aged 20)	4	0	(Portuguese Football Federation) Moreirense
16	DF	Thauan Lara	22 January 2004 (aged 19)	5	1	(Portuguese Football Federation) Portimonense
13	DF	Gustavo Martins	11 August 2002 (aged 21)	5	1	(Brazilian Football Confederation) Grêmio
4	DF	Arthur Chaves	29 January 2001 (aged 22)	5	0	(German Football Association) FC Augsburg
6	DF	Patryck Lanza	18 January 2003 (aged 20)	5	0	(Brazilian Football Confederation) Juventude
5	MF	Ronald	11 February 2003 (aged 20)	5	2	(Brazilian Football Confederation) Fortaleza
8	MF	Matheus Dias	9 May 2002 (aged 21)	4	0	(Portuguese Football Federation) Nacional
11	MF	Guilherme Biro	20 April 2004 (aged 19)	5	1	(United Arab Emirates Football Association) Ajman
15	MF	Igor Jesus	7 March 2003 (aged 20)	5	0	(United States Soccer Federation) Los Angeles
10	MF	Marquinhos	7 April 2003 (aged 20)	5	0	(Brazilian Football Confederation) Cruzeiro
7	MF	Gabriel Pirani	4 December 2002 (aged 20)	5	1	(United States Soccer Federation) D.C. United
9	FW	Matheus Nascimento	3 March 2004 (aged 19)	4	0	(United States Soccer Federation) LA Galaxy
18	FW	Figueiredo	14 August 2001 (aged 22)	4	0	(Portuguese Football Federation) Alverca
17	FW	Kaio César	15 February 2004 (aged 19)	5	0	(Brazilian Football Confederation) Corinthians

Overage Players are marked with asterisk (*).

=== Recent call-ups ===
The following players have been called up to a Brazil under-23 squad in the last 12 months.

Pos.	Player	Date of birth (age)	Caps	Goals	Club	Latest call-up
^{INJ} Player withdrew from the squad due to an injury.; ^{WIT} Player withdrew from the squad due to non-injury related reasons.; ^{CAN} The call-ups were withdrawn due to the matches being cancelled.

=== Overage players in Olympic Games ===
Tournament	Player 1	Player 2	Player 3
1996	Aldair (DF)	Rivaldo (MF)	Bebeto (FW)
2000	Did not select		
2008	Thiago Silva (DF)	Ronaldinho (MF)	Did not select
2012	Thiago Silva (DF)	Marcelo (DF)	Hulk (FW)
2016	Weverton (GK)	Renato Augusto (MF)	Neymar (FW)
2020	Aderbar Santos (GK)	Diego Carlos (DF)	Dani Alves (DF)

== Manager history ==
=== Professionalism restriction era (1952–1988) ===
- Newton Cardoso (1952–1959)
- Gradim (1959–1960)
- Vicente Feola (1960)
- Antoninho (1960–1962)
- Sylvio Pirillo (1962–1963)
- Antoninho (1963–1964)
- Vicente Feola (1964)
- Antoninho (1968)
- Celso Marão (1968)
- Antoninho (1971–1972)
- Zizinho (1975–1976)
- Cláudio Coutinho (1976)
- Mário Travaglini (1979)
- Jayme Valente (1979–1980)
- Gílson Nunes (1983)
- Cléber Camerino (1984)
- Jair Picerni (1984)
- Jair Pereira (1986)
- Carlos Alberto Silva (1987–1988)

=== U-23 era ===
- Ernesto Paulo (1991–1992)
- Carlos Alberto da Luz (1994)
- Mario Zagallo (1994)
- Pupo Gimenez (1995)
- Jairo Leal (1995)
- Mario Zagallo (1996)
- Vanderlei Luxemburgo (1999–2000)
- Valinhos (2003)
- Ricardo Gomes (2003–2004)
- Lucho Nizzo (2007)
- Dunga (2008)
- Ney Franco (2011–2012)
- Mano Menezes (2012)
- Alexandre Gallo (2014–2015)
- Rogério Micale (2015–2016)
- André Jardine (2019–2021)
- Ramon Menezes (2023–2025)
- Paulo Victor Gomes (2026–)

== Competitive record ==
Most goals scored

- Matheus Cunha 21 goals

Most goals scored in a single match

- Aírton (7 goals) vs. United States, 28 April 1963
- Caio (4 goals) vs. Bolivia, 23 February 1996 (U-23 era)

First goal scored

- Humberto Tozzi vs. Netherlands, 16 July 1952
- Sílvio vs. Argentina, 4 December 1991 (U-23 era)

Biggest victories

14–0 vs. Nicaragua, 17 October 1975
10–0 vs. United States, 28 April 1963
9–0 vs. Colombia, 30 January 2000
9–1 vs. Haiti, 2 September 1959
7–0 vs. Trinidad and Tobago, 23 October 1975
7–0 vs. United States, 7 April 1999
7–0 vs. Trinidad and Tobago, 12 January 2000
7–1 vs. Colombia, 27 December 1959

=== Olympic Games ===
Football at the Summer Olympics has been an under-23 tournament since 1992.

Olympic Games record
Host and Year	Round	Position	Pld	W	D*	L	GF	GA	Squad
(France) Paris 1900	Only club teams participated								
(United States) St. Louis 1904	Only club teams participated								
(United Kingdom) London 1908	No national representative								
(Sweden) Stockholm 1912	No national representative								
(Belgium) Antwerp 1920	Did not participate								
(France) Paris 1924	Did not participate								
(Netherlands) Amsterdam 1928	Did not participate								
(Nazi Germany) Berlin 1936	Did not participate								
(United Kingdom) London 1948	Did not participate								
(Finland) Helsinki 1952	Quarter-finals	5th	3	2	0	1	9	6	Squad
(Australia) Melbourne 1956	Did not participate								
(Italy) Rome 1960	Group stage	6th	3	2	0	1	10	6	Squad
(Japan) Tokyo 1964	Group stage	9th	3	1	1	1	5	2	Squad
Mexico City 1968	Group stage	13th	3	0	2	1	4	5	Squad
(West Germany) Munich 1972	Group stage	13th	3	0	1	2	4	6	Squad
(Canada) Montreal 1976	Fourth place	4th	5	2	1	2	6	6	Squad
(Soviet Union) Moscow 1980	Did not qualify								
(United States) Los Angeles 1984	Silver medal	2nd	6	4	1	1	9	5	Squad
(South Korea) Seoul 1988	Silver medal	2nd	6	4	1	1	12	4	Squad
(Spain) Barcelona 1992	Did not qualify								
(United States) Atlanta 1996	Bronze medal	3rd	6	4	0	2	16	8	Squad
(Australia) Sydney 2000	Quarter-finals	7th	4	2	0	2	6	6	Squad
(Greece) Athens 2004	Did not qualify								
(China) Beijing 2008	Bronze medal	3rd	6	5	0	1	14	3	Squad
(United Kingdom) London 2012	Silver medal	2nd	6	5	0	1	16	7	Squad
(Brazil) Rio de Janeiro 2016	Gold medal	1st	6	3	3	0	13	1	Squad
(Japan) Tokyo 2020	Gold medal	1st	6	4	2	0	10	4	Squad
(France) Paris 2024	Did not qualify								
(United States) Los Angeles 2028	To be determined								
Total	2 Gold medals	14/24	66	38	12	16	134	69	—

*Denotes draws include knockout matches decided on penalty kicks.
**Gold background color indicates that the tournament was won. Red border color indicates tournament was held on home soil.
***Right arrow (→) means an actual tournament status.

=== CONMEBOL Pre-Olympic Tournament ===
For the 2008, 2012 and 2016 Olympics, the qualification tournament was the South American Youth Football Championship.

CONMEBOL Pre-Olympic Tournament record
Year	Round	Pld	W	D	L	GF	GA
(Peru) 1960	Third place	6	3	0	3	14	10
(Peru) 1964	Runners-up	4	3	1	0	10	2
(Colombia) 1968	Champions	6	3	2	1	9	2
(Colombia) 1971	Champions	7	4	3	0	7	3
(Brazil) 1976	Champions	5	4	1	0	12	2
(Colombia) 1980	Fifth place	6	2	1	3	8	12
(Ecuador) 1984	Champions	5	4	1	0	9	3
(Bolivia) 1987	Champions	7	3	2	2	9	9
(Paraguay) 1992	Group stage	4	2	1	1	4	4
(Argentina) 1996	Champions	7	5	2	0	21	6
(Brazil) 2000	Champions	7	5	2	0	24	6
(Chile) 2004	Third place	8	4	2	2	15	5
(Colombia) 2020	Runners-up	7	5	2	0	16	7
(Venezuela) 2024	Third place	7	4	0	3	8	7
Total	7 Titles	85	51	19	15	166	78

=== Pan American Games ===
Pan American Games record
Host and Year	Round	Position	Pld	W	D*	L	GF	GA	Squad
(Argentina) Buenos Aires 1951	Did not enter								
Mexico City 1955	Did not enter								
(United States) Chicago 1959	Silver medal	2nd	6	4	1	1	27	11	Squad
(Brazil) São Paulo 1963	Gold medal	1st	4	3	1	0	18	3	Squad
(Canada) Winnipeg 1967	Did not enter								
(Colombia) Cali 1971	Did not enter								
Mexico City 1975	Gold medal	1st	7	5	2	0	33	2	Squad
(Puerto Rico) San Juan 1979	Gold medal	1st	5	5	0	0	14	1	Squad
(Venezuela) Caracas 1983	Silver medal	2nd	3	2	0	1	3	1	Squad
(United States) Indianapolis 1987	Gold medal	1st	5	4	1	0	10	2	Squad
(Cuba) Havana 1991	Did not enter								
(Argentina) Mar del Plata 1995	Quarter-finals	5th	4	2	2	0	5	2	Squad
(Canada) Winnipeg 1999	Did not enter								
(Dominican Republic) Santo Domingo 2003	Silver medal	2nd	5	4	0	1	12	2	Squad
(Brazil) Rio de Janeiro 2007	Group stage	5th	3	2	0	1	7	4	Squad
(Mexico) Guadalajara 2011	Group stage	6th	3	0	2	1	2	4	Squad
(Canada) Toronto 2015	Bronze medal	3rd	5	3	1	1	15	7	Squad
(Peru) Lima 2019	Did not qualify								
(Chile) Santiago 2023	Gold medal	1st	5	4	1	0	8	1	Squad
Total	5 Gold medals	12/19	55	38	11	6	154	40	—

*Denotes draws include knockout matches decided on penalty kicks.
**Gold background color indicates that the tournament was won. Red border color indicates tournament was held on home soil.
***Right arrow (→) means an actual tournament status.

== Honours ==
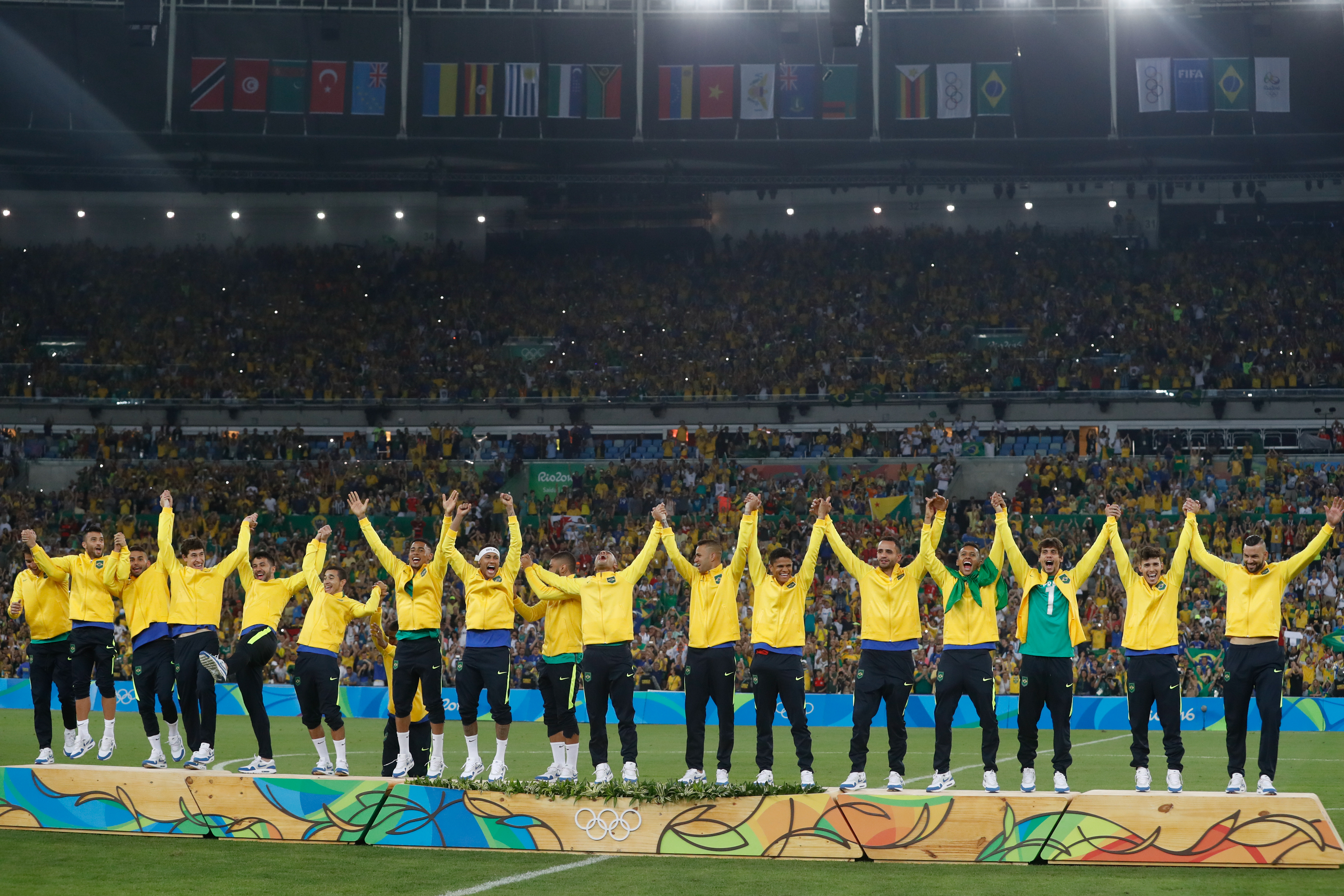
Brazil Olympic Team – 2016 Gold Medalists

- Summer Olympics:
  - (gold) Gold medalists (2): 2016, 2020
  - (silver) Silver medalists (3): 1984, 1988, 2012
  - (bronze) Bronze medalists (2): 1996, 2008
  - Fourth place: 1976
- Pan American Games:
  - (gold) Gold medalists (5): 1963, 1975 (shared), 1979, 1987, 2023
  - (silver) Silver medalists (3): 1959, 1983, 2003
  - (bronze) Bronze medalists (1): 2015
- CONMEBOL Pre-Olympic Tournament:
  - Champions (7): 1968, 1971, 1976, 1984, 1987, 1996, 2000
  - Runners-up (2): 1964, 2020
  - Third place (2): 1960, 2004
- South American Games:
  - (bronze) Bronze medalists (1): 1986

=== Friendlies ===
- Camel Nations Cup:
  - Winners: 1988
- Copa Mercosur:
  - Winners: 1995
- Wuhan Youth Soccer Tournament:
  - Winners: 2014
- Toulon Tournament:
  - Winners: 2019

== See also ==
- Sport in Brazil
- Football in Brazil
- Brazil national football team
- Brazil national under-20 football team
- Brazil national under-17 football team
- Brazil national under-15 football team
- Brazil national futsal team
- Brazil national beach soccer team
