= Football at the 2023 Pan American Games – Men's team squads =

The men's football tournament at the 2023 Pan American Games was held in Chile from 23 October to 4 November 2023. The eight teams involved in the tournament were required to register a squad of 18 players, including two goalkeepers.

Teams participating in the men's competition were restricted to under-23 players (born on or after 1 January 2000), and a maximum of three overage players were allowed. Overage players indicated in bold.

== Group A ==
=== Chile ===
Head coach: (Argentina) Eduardo Berizzo

The 18-man squad was announced on 3 October 2023.

No.	Pos.	Player	Date of birth (age)	Caps	Goals	Club
1	GK	**Brayan Cortés** (captain)	11 March 1995 (aged 28)	3	0	(Football Federation of Chile) Colo-Colo
2	DF	Jonathan Villagra	28 March 2001 (aged 22)	1	0	(Football Federation of Chile) Unión Española
3	DF	Bruno Gutiérrez	25 June 2002 (aged 21)	1	0	(Football Federation of Chile) Colo-Colo
4	DF	Daniel Gutiérrez	16 February 2003 (aged 20)	1	0	(Football Federation of Chile) Colo-Colo
5	DF	**Matías Zaldivia**	22 January 1991 (aged 32)	0	0	(Football Federation of Chile) Universidad de Chile
6	MF	Vicente Pizarro	5 November 2002 (aged 20)	1	0	(Football Federation of Chile) Colo-Colo
7	FW	Maximiliano Guerrero	15 January 2000 (aged 23)	0	0	(Football Federation of Chile) La Serena
8	MF	**César Fuentes**	12 April 1993 (aged 30)	0	0	(Football Federation of Chile) Colo-Colo
9	FW	Alexander Aravena	6 September 2002 (aged 21)	1	1	(Football Federation of Chile) Universidad Católica
10	MF	Lucas Assadi	8 January 2004 (aged 19)	1	0	(Football Federation of Chile) Universidad de Chile
11	FW	Clemente Montes	25 April 2001 (aged 22)	0	0	(Football Federation of Chile) Universidad Católica
12	GK	Tomás Ahumada	24 June 2001 (aged 22)	0	0	(Football Federation of Chile) Audax Italiano
13	MF	Alfred Canales	27 April 2000 (aged 23)	0	0	(Football Federation of Chile) Magallanes
14	FW	Julián Alfaro	2 September 2001 (aged 22)	0	0	(Football Federation of Chile) Magallanes
15	DF	Antonio Díaz	26 April 2000 (aged 23)	0	0	(Football Federation of Chile) O'Higgins
16	DF	Felipe Loyola	9 November 2000 (aged 22)	0	0	(Football Federation of Chile) Huachipato
17	MF	César Pérez	29 November 2002 (aged 20)	1	0	(Football Federation of Chile) Unión La Calera
18	FW	Damián Pizarro	28 March 2005 (aged 18)	0	0	(Football Federation of Chile) Colo-Colo

=== Mexico ===
Head coach: Ricardo Cadena

The preliminary squad of 22 players was announced on 6 October 2023. On 16 October, the final squad was announced.

No.	Pos.	Player	Date of birth (age)	Caps	Goals	Club
1	GK	Fernando Tapia	17 June 2001 (aged 22)	0	0	(Mexican Football Federation) Querétaro
2	DF	Pablo Monroy	22 June 2002 (aged 21)	0	0	(Mexican Football Federation) UNAM
3	DF	Emilio Lara	18 May 2002 (aged 21)	0	0	(Mexican Football Federation) América
4	DF	Rafael Fernández	5 August 2000 (aged 23)	0	0	(Mexican Football Federation) Tijuana
5	DF	Mauricio Isais	9 April 2001 (aged 22)	0	0	(Mexican Football Federation) Toluca
6	MF	Érik Lira (captain)	8 May 2000 (aged 23)	0	0	(Mexican Football Federation) Cruz Azul
7	MF	Raymundo Fulgencio	12 February 2000 (aged 23)	0	0	(Mexican Football Federation) UANL
8	MF	Fidel Ambríz	21 March 2003 (aged 20)	0	0	(Mexican Football Federation) León
9	FW	Ettson Ayón	26 March 2001 (aged 22)	0	0	(Mexican Football Federation) Querétaro
10	MF	Jordán Carrillo	30 November 2001 (aged 21)	0	0	(Royal Spanish Football Federation) Sporting Gijón
11	MF	Bryan González	10 April 2003 (aged 20)	0	0	(Mexican Football Federation) Pachuca
12	GK	Eduardo García	11 July 2002 (aged 21)	0	0	(Mexican Football Federation) Tapatío
13	DF	Jesús Garza	6 June 2000 (aged 23)	0	0	(Mexican Football Federation) UANL
14	DF	Tony Leone	28 April 2004 (aged 19)	0	0	(United States Soccer Federation) Los Angeles FC
15	MF	Sebastián Pérez Bouquet	22 June 2003 (aged 20)	0	0	(Mexican Football Federation) Juárez
16	FW	Jesús Brígido	29 September 2001 (aged 22)	0	0	(Mexican Football Federation) Tapatío
17	MF	Ramiro Árciga	30 August 2004 (aged 19)	0	0	(Mexican Football Federation) Mazatlán
18	FW	Alí Ávila	23 September 2003 (aged 20)	0	0	(Mexican Football Federation) Monterrey

=== Dominican Republic ===
Head coach: Edward Acevedo

The 18-man squad was announced on 19 October 2023.

No.	Pos.	Player	Date of birth (age)	Caps	Goals	Club
1	GK	Omry Bello	28 May 2003 (aged 20)	0	0	(Dominican Football Federation) O&M
2	DF	Israel Boatwright	2 June 2005 (aged 18)	0	0	(United States Soccer Federation) Inter Miami
3	DF	Joao Urbáez	24 July 2002 (aged 21)	1	0	(Royal Spanish Football Federation) Leganés B
4	DF	Álex Jiménez	13 January 2002 (aged 21)	3	0	(Royal Spanish Football Federation) Tona
5	DF	Kleffer Martes	13 January 2003 (aged 20)	0	0	(Dominican Football Federation) Atlético Pantoja
6	MF	Isaac Báez	23 May 2002 (aged 21)	0	0	(Dominican Football Federation) O&M
7	FW	Alejandro Martín	16 February 2006 (aged 17)	0	0	(Royal Spanish Football Federation) Murcia
8	MF	Omar de la Cruz	26 August 2001 (aged 22)	0	0	(Royal Spanish Football Federation) Peña Deportiva
9	FW	Anyelo Gómez	2 January 2003 (aged 20)	0	0	(Dominican Football Federation) Atlántico
10	MF	Edison Azcona (captain)	21 November 2003 (aged 19)	3	1	(United States Soccer Federation) Inter Miami
11	FW	Nowend Lorenzo	2 November 2002 (aged 20)	3	0	(Royal Spanish Football Federation) Osasuna B
12	GK	Enrique Bösl	7 February 2004 (aged 19)	0	0	(German Football Association) FC Ingolstadt
13	DF	Michael Sambataro	4 December 2002 (aged 20)	0	0	(Argentine Football Association) Güemes
14	MF	Yordy Álvarez	3 December 2005 (aged 17)	0	0	(Dominican Football Federation) Atlántico
15	DF	Thomas Jungbauer	30 July 2005 (aged 18)	0	0	(Football Association of the Czech Republic) Dynamo České Budějovice
16	DF	Alex Ciriaco	21 March 2004 (aged 19)	0	0	(Football Association of Finland) Ilves Tampere
17	FW	Josué Báez	23 May 2002 (aged 21)	0	0	(Dominican Football Federation) O&M
18	MF	Jesús Rosa	22 April 2001 (aged 22)	0	0	(Dominican Football Federation) Cibao

=== Uruguay ===
Head coach: (Chile) Diego Reyes

The 18-man squad was announced on 29 September 2023.

No.	Pos.	Player	Date of birth (age)	Caps	Goals	Club
1	GK	Ramiro Méndez	7 January 2001 (aged 22)	0	0	(Uruguayan Football Association) La Luz
2	DF	Alan Saldivia (captain)	6 April 2002 (aged 21)	0	0	(Football Federation of Chile) Colo-Colo
3	DF	Renzo Orihuela	4 April 2001 (aged 22)	0	0	(Uruguayan Football Association) Montevideo City Torque
4	DF	Sebastián Figueredo	25 August 2001 (aged 22)	0	0	(Uruguayan Football Association) Wanderers
5	MF	Vicente Poggi	11 July 2002 (aged 21)	0	0	(Mexican Football Federation) Necaxa
6	DF	Jairo O'Neil	31 July 2001 (aged 22)	0	0	(Argentine Football Association) Union
7	FW	Diego Hernández	22 June 2000 (aged 23)	0	0	(Brazilian Football Confederation) Botafogo
8	MF	Rodrigo Chagas	20 August 2003 (aged 20)	0	0	(Uruguayan Football Association) Nacional
9	FW	Emiliano Rodríguez	16 June 2003 (aged 20)	0	0	(Uruguayan Football Association) Boston River
10	MF	Manuel Monzeglio	25 September 2001 (aged 22)	0	0	(Uruguayan Football Association) Nacional
11	FW	**Rodrigo Piñeiro**	5 May 1999 (aged 24)	0	0	(Football Federation of Chile) Unión Española
12	GK	Facundo Machado	19 January 2004 (aged 19)	0	0	(Uruguayan Football Association) Nacional
13	DF	Edhard Greising	2 September 2000 (aged 23)	0	0	(Uruguayan Football Association) Plaza Colonia
14	MF	Francisco Barrios	19 February 2002 (aged 21)	0	0	(Uruguayan Football Association) Boston River
15	FW	Juan Cruz de los Santos	22 February 2003 (aged 20)	0	0	(Uruguayan Football Association) River Plate
16	FW	Joaquín Lavega	3 February 2005 (aged 18)	0	0	(Uruguayan Football Association) River Plate
17	FW	Dylan Nandín	28 February 2002 (aged 21)	0	0	(Uruguayan Football Association) Cerro
18	DF	Martín Gianoli	27 September 2000 (aged 23)	0	0	(Uruguayan Football Association) Cerro Largo

== Group B ==
=== Brazil ===
Head coach: Ramon Menezes

The 18-man squad was announced on 22 September 2023. On 10 October, Gabriel Veron and Lucas Halter were replaced by Gabriel Pirani and Michel. On 11 October, defender Rikelme was replaced by Thauan Lara. On 17 October, right-back João Moreira was injured in a training session and replaced by Miranda.

No.	Pos.	Player	Date of birth (age)	Caps	Goals	Club
1	GK	Mycael	12 March 2004 (aged 19)	0	0	(Brazilian Football Confederation) Athletico Paranaense
2	DF	Miranda	19 January 2000 (aged 23)	0	0	(Brazilian Football Confederation) Vasco da Gama
3	DF	Michel	20 May 2003 (aged 20)	0	0	(Brazilian Football Confederation) Palmeiras
4	DF	Arthur Chaves	29 January 2001 (aged 22)	0	0	(Portuguese Football Federation) Académico de Viseu
5	MF	Ronald	11 February 2003 (aged 20)	0	0	(Brazilian Football Confederation) Grêmio
6	DF	Patryck Lanza	18 January 2003 (aged 20)	0	0	(Brazilian Football Confederation) São Paulo
7	MF	Gabriel Pirani	4 December 2002 (aged 20)	0	0	(United States Soccer Federation) D.C. United
8	MF	Matheus Dias	9 May 2002 (aged 21)	0	0	(Brazilian Football Confederation) Internacional
9	FW	Matheus Nascimento	3 March 2004 (aged 19)	0	0	(Brazilian Football Confederation) Botafogo
10	MF	Marquinhos	7 April 2003 (aged 20)	0	0	(French Football Federation) Nantes
11	MF	Guilherme Biro (captain)	20 April 2004 (aged 19)	0	0	(Brazilian Football Confederation) Corinthians
12	GK	Andrew	1 July 2001 (aged 22)	0	0	(Portuguese Football Federation) Gil Vicente
13	DF	Gustavo Martins	11 August 2002 (aged 21)	0	0	(Brazilian Football Confederation) Grêmio
14	GK	Matheus Donelli	17 May 2002 (aged 21)	0	0	(Brazilian Football Confederation) Corinthians
15	MF	Igor Jesus	7 March 2003 (aged 20)	0	0	(Brazilian Football Confederation) Flamengo
16	DF	Thauan Lara	22 January 2004 (aged 19)	0	0	(Brazilian Football Confederation) Internacional
17	FW	Kaio César	15 February 2004 (aged 19)	0	0	(Brazilian Football Confederation) Coritiba
18	FW	Figueiredo	14 August 2001 (aged 22)	0	0	(Brazilian Football Confederation) Vasco da Gama

=== United States ===
Head coach: Michael Nsien

The 18-man squad was announced on 9 October 2023. Reed Baker-Whiting was also called up, but ended up being withdrawn from the final list.

No.	Pos.	Player	Date of birth (age)	Caps	Goals	Club
1	GK	Chituru Odunze	14 October 2002 (aged 21)	0	0	(United States Soccer Federation) Charlotte FC
2	DF	Mauricio Cuevas	10 February 2003 (aged 20)	0	0	(United States Soccer Federation) LA Galaxy
3	DF	Michael Wentzel	10 April 2002 (aged 21)	0	0	(United States Soccer Federation) St. Louis City
4	DF	Nico Carrera (captain)	6 May 2002 (aged 21)	0	0	(German Football Association) Holstein Kiel
5	DF	Thomas Williams	15 August 2004 (aged 19)	0	0	(United States Soccer Federation) Orlando City
6	MF	Danny Leyva	5 May 2003 (aged 20)	0	0	(United States Soccer Federation) Colorado Rapids
7	MF	Jackson Hopkins	1 July 2004 (aged 19)	0	0	(United States Soccer Federation) D.C. United
8	MF	Brooklyn Raines	11 March 2005 (aged 18)	0	0	(United States Soccer Federation) Houston Dynamo
9	MF	Theodore Ku-DiPietro	28 January 2002 (aged 21)	0	0	(United States Soccer Federation) D.C. United
10	MF	Jack Panayotou	5 June 2004 (aged 19)	0	0	(United States Soccer Federation) New England Revolution
11	FW	Tega Ikoba	14 August 2003 (aged 20)	0	0	(United States Soccer Federation) Portland Timbers
12	GK	Antonio Carrera	15 March 2004 (aged 19)	0	0	(United States Soccer Federation) FC Dallas
13	DF	Alex Freeman	9 August 2004 (aged 19)	0	0	(United States Soccer Federation) Orlando City
14	FW	Vaughn Covil	26 July 2003 (aged 20)	0	0	(The Football Association) Hull City
15	MF	Sergio Oregel	16 May 2005 (aged 18)	0	0	(United States Soccer Federation) Chicago Fire
16	DF	Nolan Norris	17 February 2005 (aged 18)	0	0	(United States Soccer Federation) FC Dallas
17	FW	Rodrigo Neri	12 May 2005 (aged 18)	0	0	(Royal Spanish Football Federation) Atlético Madrid
18	MF	Javier Casas	14 May 2003 (aged 20)	0	0	(United States Soccer Federation) Chicago Fire

=== Honduras ===
Head coach: (Colombia) Bernardo Redín

The 18-man squad was announced on 17 October 2023.

No.	Pos.	Player	Date of birth (age)	Caps	Goals	Club
1	GK	Jurgen García	28 January 2005 (aged 18)	0	0	(National Autonomous Federation of Football of Honduras) Lone FC
2	MF	**Deyron Martínez**	20 December 1999 (aged 23)	0	0	(National Autonomous Federation of Football of Honduras) Real Sociedad
3	DF	Julián Martínez	1 December 2003 (aged 19)	0	0	(National Autonomous Federation of Football of Honduras) Olimpia
4	DF	André Orellana	11 March 2002 (aged 21)	0	0	(National Autonomous Federation of Football of Honduras) Marathón
5	DF	Luis Vega (captain)	28 February 2002 (aged 21)	0	0	(National Autonomous Federation of Football of Honduras) Motagua
6	DF	Javier Arriaga	1 August 2004 (aged 19)	0	0	(National Autonomous Federation of Football of Honduras) Marathón
7	MF	Jeffry Miranda	3 September 2002 (aged 21)	0	0	(National Autonomous Federation of Football of Honduras) Marathón
8	MF	Gerson Chávez	31 January 2000 (aged 23)	0	0	(National Autonomous Federation of Football of Honduras) Vida
9	FW	Daniel Carter	12 September 2003 (aged 20)	0	0	(National Autonomous Federation of Football of Honduras) Real España
10	MF	Antony García	29 October 2004 (aged 18)	0	0	(National Autonomous Federation of Football of Honduras) Motagua
11	FW	Jefrín Macías	2 January 2004 (aged 19)	0	0	(National Autonomous Federation of Football of Honduras) Lobos UPNFM
12	MF	Samuel Elvir	25 April 2001 (aged 22)	0	0	(National Autonomous Federation of Football of Honduras) Marathón
13	FW	Marco Aceituno	28 December 2003 (aged 19)	0	0	(National Autonomous Federation of Football of Honduras) Real España
14	MF	David Ruiz	8 February 2004 (aged 19)	0	0	(United States Soccer Federation) Inter Miami
15	DF	Afronit Tatum	2 June 2005 (aged 18)	0	0	(National Autonomous Federation of Football of Honduras) Real España
16	DF	Edson Palacios	11 June 2001 (aged 22)	0	0	(National Autonomous Federation of Football of Honduras) Vida
17	DF	Axel Maldonado	24 July 2001 (aged 22)	0	0	(National Autonomous Federation of Football of Honduras) Olimpia
18	GK	**Enrique Facussé**	30 December 1998 (aged 24)	0	0	(National Autonomous Federation of Football of Honduras) Motagua

=== Colombia ===
Head coach: Héctor Cárdenas

The 18-man squad was announced on 2 October 2023. Brayan Ceballos and Jimer Fory were originally called-up, but both were injured during training sessions and replaced by Jhojan Torres and Kalazan Suárez, respectively.

No.	Pos.	Player	Date of birth (age)	Caps	Goals	Club
1	GK	Sebastián Guerra	8 January 2001 (aged 22)	0	0	(United States Soccer Federation) Atlanta United
2	DF	Cristian Devenish (captain)	25 January 2001 (aged 22)	1	0	(Colombian Football Federation) Atlético Nacional
4	MF	Andrés Mauricio Alarcón	19 May 2001 (aged 22)	0	0	(Colombian Football Federation) Patriotas Boyacá
5	DF	Stiven Valencia	13 March 2003 (aged 20)	1	0	(Colombian Football Federation) Cortuluá
6	MF	Fabián Ángel	10 January 2001 (aged 22)	0	0	(Colombian Football Federation) Junior
9	FW	Ricardo Caraballo	9 February 2004 (aged 19)	0	0	(Colombian Football Federation) Barranquilla
10	MF	Daniel Ruiz	30 July 2001 (aged 22)	0	0	(Colombian Football Federation) Millonarios
11	FW	Jersson David González	15 September 2001 (aged 22)	1	0	(Colombian Football Federation) Santa Fe
12	GK	Luis Marquinez	10 April 2003 (aged 20)	1	0	(Colombian Football Federation) Atlético Nacional
13	MF	Juan Castilla	27 July 2004 (aged 19)	0	0	(Colombian Football Federation) Deportivo Cali
14	FW	Carlos Manuel Cortés	17 September 2001 (aged 22)	1	1	(Colombian Football Federation) Cortuluá
15	FW	Luis Felipe Mosquera	5 June 2002 (aged 21)	1	1	(Colombian Football Federation) America de Cali
16	DF	Éber Moreno	11 January 2002 (aged 21)	1	0	(Colombian Football Federation) Deportivo Pereira
17	DF	Kalazan Suárez	5 March 2002 (aged 21)	1	0	(Colombian Football Federation) Cortuluá
18	MF	Jhojan Torres	12 January 2003 (aged 20)	1	0	(Colombian Football Federation) Santa Fe
20	DF	Alejandro García	28 February 2001 (aged 22)	1	0	(Colombian Football Federation) Once Caldas
21	MF	Johan Rojas	7 September 2004 (aged 19)	0	0	(Colombian Football Federation) La Equidad
24	FW	Brahian Palacios	24 November 2002 (aged 20)	0	0	(Colombian Football Federation) Atlético Nacional
