= Daniel Gutiérrez =

Chilean footballer (born 2003)

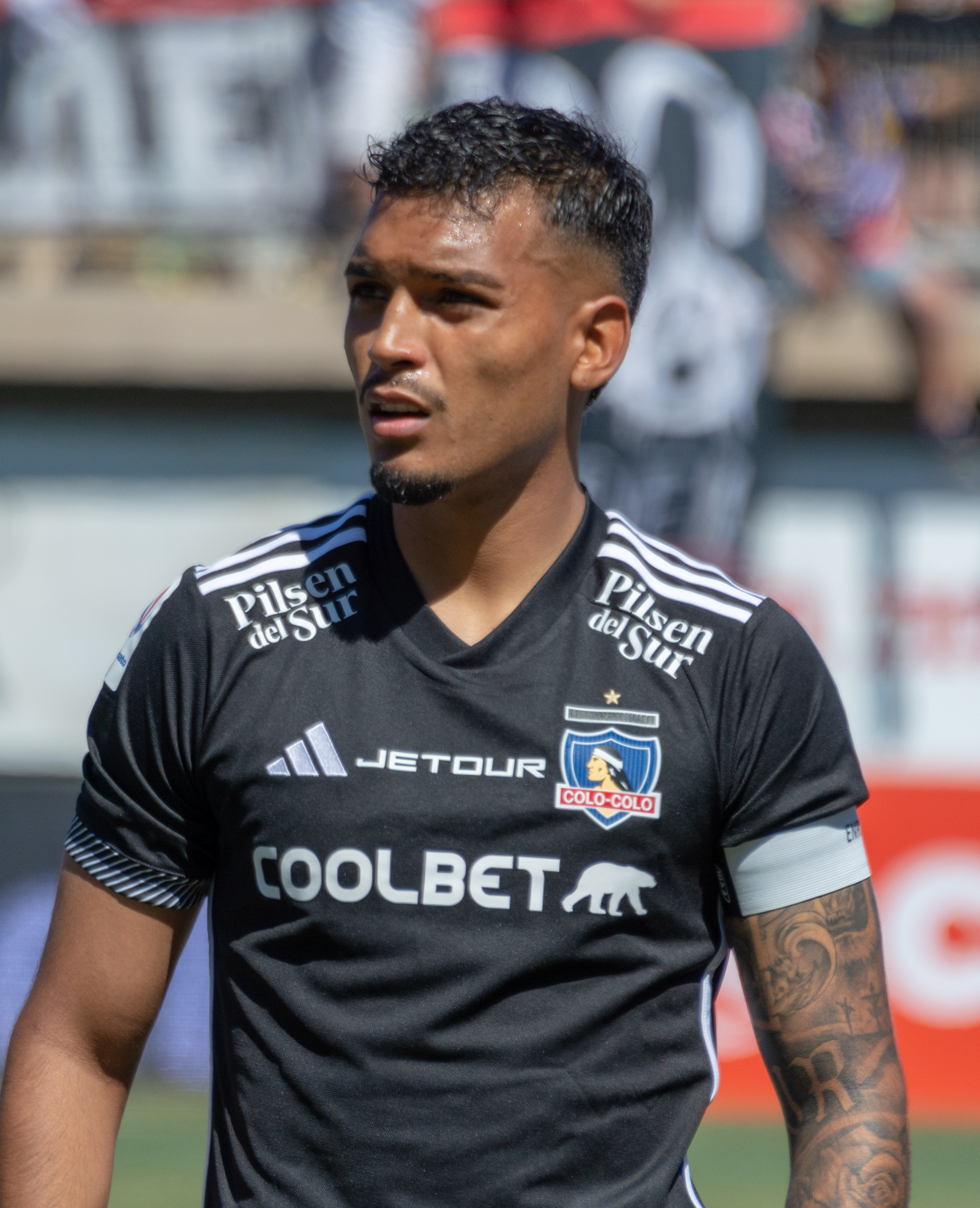
- Gutiérrez with Colo-Colo in 2024

Personal information
- Full name: Daniel Ademir Gutiérrez Rojas
- Date of birth: 16 February 2003 (age 23)
- Place of birth: Arica, Chile
- Height: 1.76 m (5 ft 9 in)
- Position: Defender

Team information
- Current team: Unión La Calera (on loan from Colo-Colo)

Youth career
- 2007–2010: Colo-Colo Arica
- 2011–2020: Colo-Colo

Senior career*
Years	Team	Apps	(Gls)
2021–	Colo-Colo	46	(1)
2026–	→ Unión La Calera (loan)	0	(0)

International career^{‡}
2019	Chile U15		
2019	Chile U17	7	(0)
2021–2022	Chile U20	7	(0)
2022–	Chile U23	9	(0)
Medal record
Men's football
Representing Chile
Pan American Games
Silver medal – second place	2023 Santiago	Team
- * Club domestic league appearances and goals as of 13 November 2024 ‡ National team caps and goals as of 13 February 2024

Daniel Ademir Gutiérrez Rojas (born 16 February 2003) is a Chilean professional footballer who plays as a defender for Unión La Calera on loan from Colo-Colo.

== Club career ==
At the age of 4, Gutiérrez came to a club officially affiliated with Colo-Colo based in his birthplace, Arica. On 2011, he moved to Santiago to join Colo-Colo Youth Team at the age of 8. He made his debut at professional level in the first matchday of the 2021 Chilean Primera División in a match against Unión La Calera on March 27, becoming the second Arica-born player who has played for Colo-Colo after Claudio Antezana.

In January 2026, Gutiérrez was loaned out to Unión La Calera for a season.

== International career ==
Gutiérrez represented Chile U17 at the 2019 South American U-17 Championship – Chile was the runner-up – and at the 2019 FIFA U-17 World Cup. Next, he took part of the Chile U15 squad at the UEFA U-16 Development Tournament in Finland in April 2019.

In December 2021, he represented Chile U20 as the team captain at the friendly tournament Copa Rául Coloma Rivas, playing three matches. In September 2022, he made 3 appearances in the Costa Cálida Supercup. In the 2022 South American Games, he made an appearance.

He represented Chile at under-23 level in a 1–0 win against Peru U23 on 31 August 2022, in the context of preparations for the 2023 Pan American Games. He was included in the final squad for the games, where Chile won the silver medal, playing all matches.

In 2024, he took part in the Pre-Olympic Tournament.

== Career statistics ==
=== Club ===
As of 13 November 2024

Appearances and goals by club, season and competition
Club	Season	League			Cup		Continental		Total	
Club	Season	Division	Apps	Goals	Apps	Goals	Apps	Goals	Apps	Goals
Colo-Colo	2021	Chilean Primera División	9	0	3	0	—		12	0
Colo-Colo	2022	Chilean Primera División	4	0	1	0	1	0	6	0
Colo-Colo	2023	Chilean Primera División	15	0	2	0	5	0	22	0
Colo-Colo	2024	Chilean Primera División	12	1	3	0	2	0	17	1
Career total			40	1	9	0	8	0	57	1

== Honours ==
Chile U23

- Pan American Games Silver Medal: 2023
