= Antonio Díaz (Chilean footballer) =

Chilean footballer (born 2000)

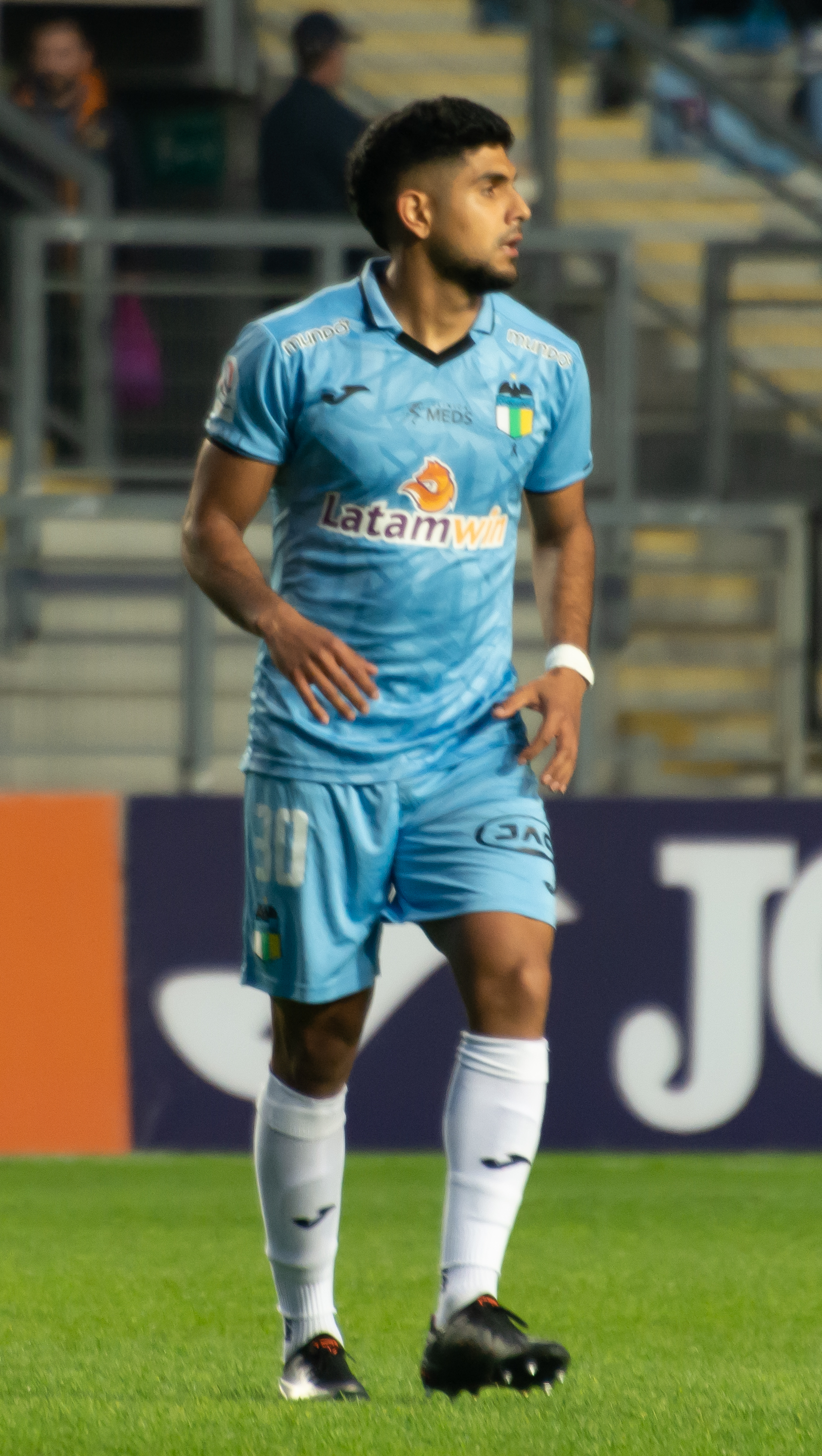
- Díaz with O'Higgins in 2023

Personal information
- Full name: Antonio Alejandro Díaz Campos
- Date of birth: 26 April 2000 (age 26)
- Place of birth: Rancagua, Chile
- Height: 1.72 m (5 ft 8 in)
- Position: Left wing-back

Team information
- Current team: Universidad de Concepción (on loan from Universidad de Chile)

Youth career
- O'Higgins

Senior career*
| Years | Team | Apps | (Gls) |
| 2018–2024 | O'Higgins | 98 | (2) |
| 2024– | Universidad de Chile | 13 | (0) |
| 2026– | → Universidad de Concepción (loan) | 0 | (0) |

International career^{‡}
| 2017 | Chile U17 | 16 | (2) |
| 2018–2019 | Chile U20 | 6 | (0) |
| 2023 | Chile U23 | 1 | (0) |
Medal record
Men's football
Representing Chile
South American Games
| Gold medal – first place | 2018 Cochabamba |
Pan American Games
| Silver medal – second place | 2023 Santiago | Team |
- * Club domestic league appearances and goals as of 13 January 2026 ‡ National team caps and goals as of 5 November 2023

Antonio Alejandro Díaz Campos (born 26 April 2000) is a Chilean professional footballer who plays as a left wing-back for Universidad de Concepción on loan from Universidad de Chile.

== Club career ==
In July 2024, Díaz signed with Universidad de Chile from O'Higgins. In 2026, he was loaned out to Universidad de Concepción.

== International career ==
He represented Chile U17 at two friendly matches against USA U17, at the 2017 South American U-17 Championship – he scored a goal and Chile was the runner-up – and at the 2017 FIFA U-17 World Cup. Also, he played all the matches and scored a goal for Chile U17 at the friendly tournament Lafarge Foot Avenir 2017 in France, better known as Tournament Limoges, where Chile became champion after defeating Belgium U18 and Poland U18 and drawing France U18.

He was in the Chile U20 squad for the 2019 South American U-20 Championship, making an appearance at the tournament against Brazil U20. In addition, with Chile U20 he won the gold medal in the 2018 South American Games.

He was included in the final squad for the 2023 Pan American Games, where Chile won the silver medal.

== Honours ==
Chile U17

- Tournoi de Limoges: 2017

Chile U20

- South American Games Gold medal: 2018

Chile U23

- Pan American Games Silver Medal: 2023
