= Tomás Ahumada =

Chilean footballer (born 2001)

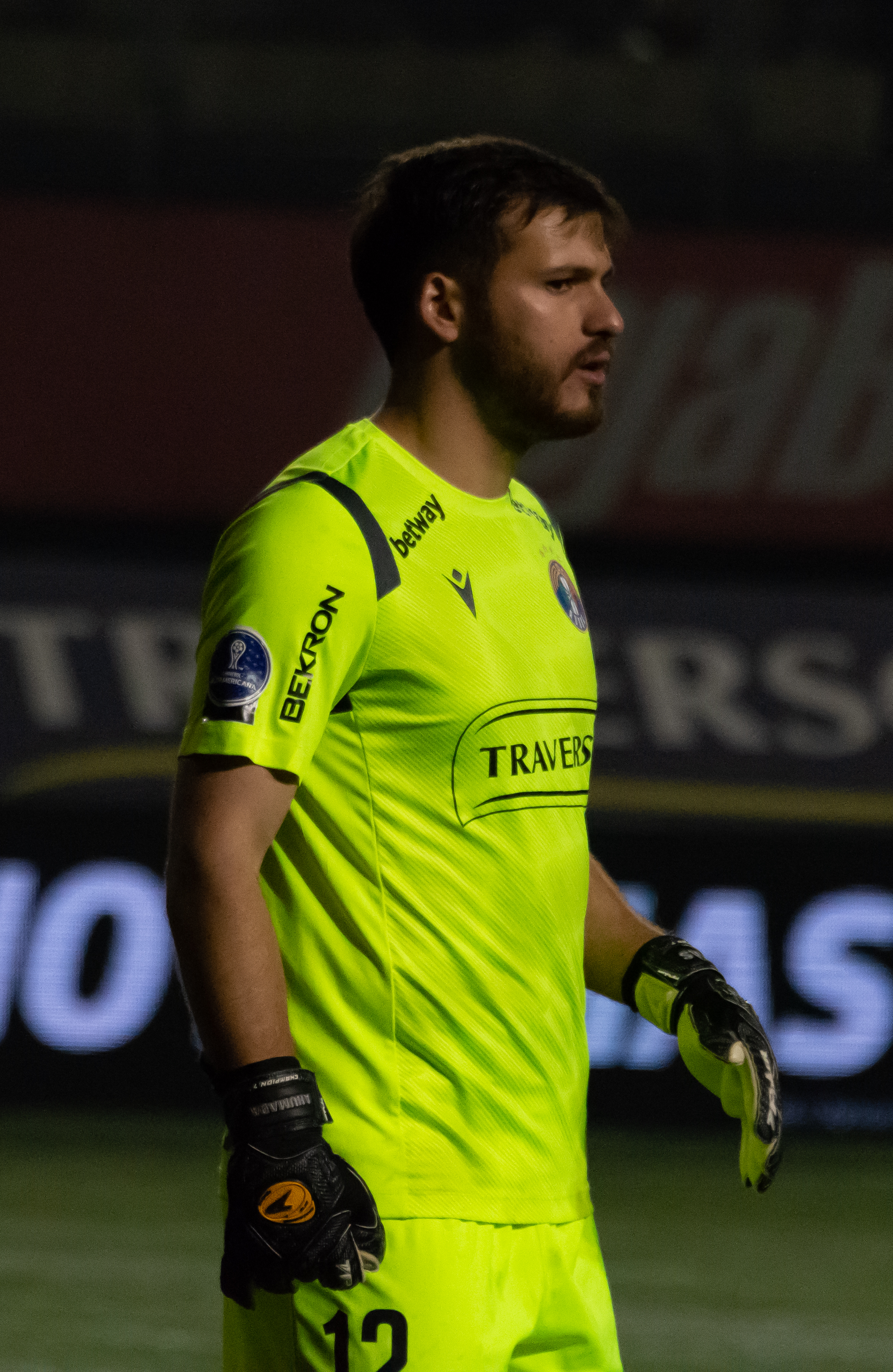
- Ahumada in 2023.

Personal information
- Full name: Tomás Alejandro Ahumada Oteíza
- Date of birth: 24 June 2001 (age 25)
- Place of birth: Recoleta, Chile
- Height: 1.81 m (5 ft 11 in)
- Position: Goalkeeper

Team information
- Current team: Audax Italiano
- Number: 12

Youth career
- Audax Italiano

Senior career*
Years	Team	Apps	(Gls)
2022–	Audax Italiano	48	(0)

International career^{‡}
2023	Chile U23		
Medal record
Men's football
Representing Chile
Pan American Games
Silver medal – second place	2023 Santiago	Team
- * Club domestic league appearances and goals as of 20:06, 16 March 2023 (UTC) ‡ National team caps and goals as of 5 November 2023

Tomás Alejandro Ahumada Oteíza (born 24 June 2001) is a Chilean professional footballer who plays as a goalkeeper for the Chilean Primera División club Audax Italiano.

== Club career ==
A youth product of Audax Italiano, Ahumada signed his first professional contract with the club on 2 February 2022. He made his professional and senior debut with Audax Italiano in a 2–1 Chilean Primera División win over Ñublense on 30 June 2022. He became a regular starter for the club in his debut season and helped them earn qualification to the Copa Sudamericana.

== International career ==
Ahumada was called up to the Chile U23s in August 2022 for a set of preparatory matches before the 2023 Pan American Games. He was included in the final squad for the games, where Chile won the silver medal.

== Honours ==
Chile U23

- Pan American Games Silver Medal: 2023
