= Felipe Loyola =

Chilean footballer (born 2000)

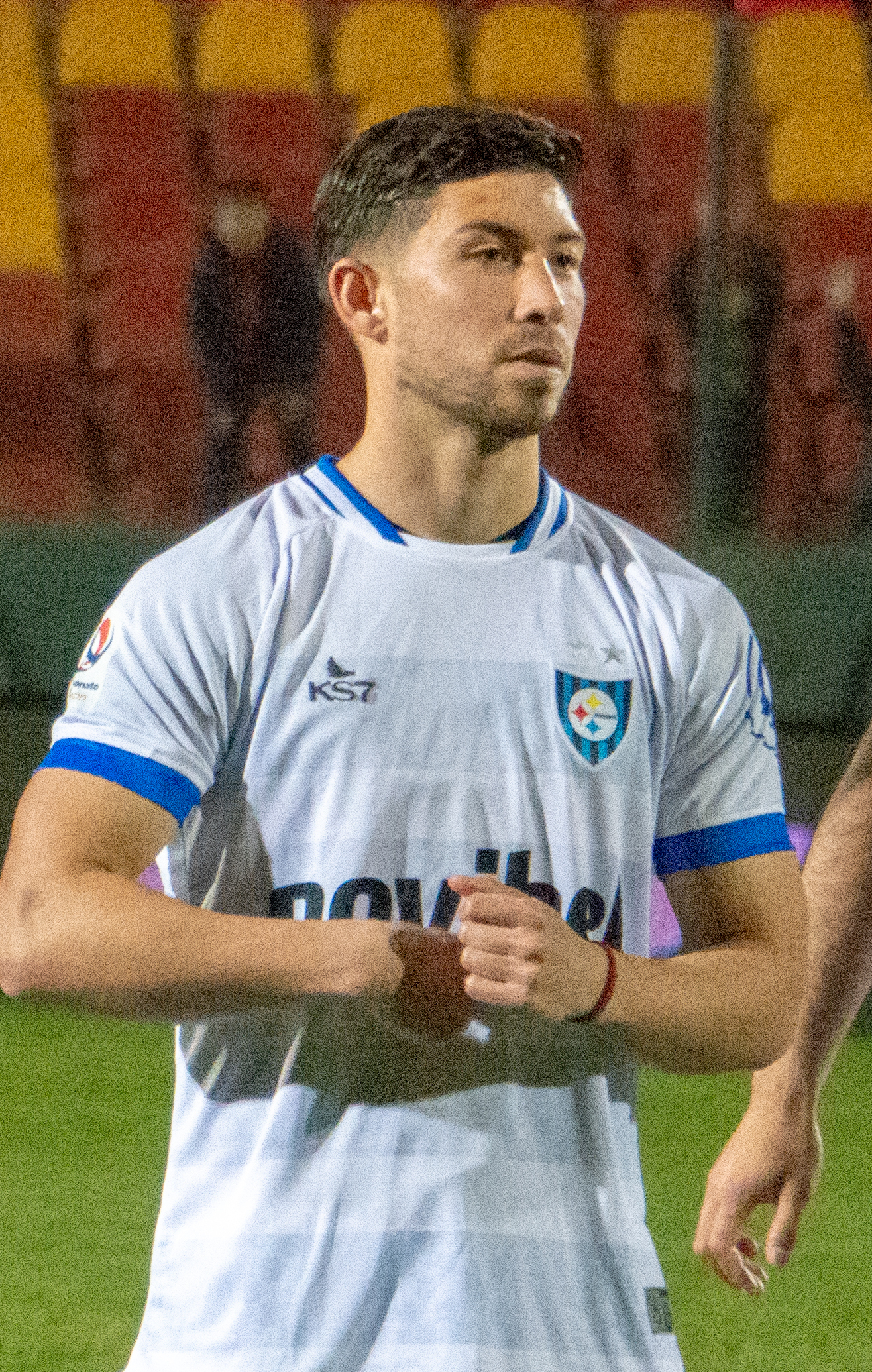
- Loyola with Huachipato in 2023

Personal information
- Full name: Felipe Ignacio Loyola Olea
- Date of birth: 9 November 2000 (age 26)
- Place of birth: Santiago, Chile
- Height: 1.77 m (5 ft 10 in)
- Positions: Defender; midfielder

Team information
- Current team: Pisa
- Number: 14

Youth career
- 2008–2019: Colo-Colo

Senior career*
| Years | Team | Apps | (Gls) |
| 2020–2021 | Colo-Colo | 0 | (0) |
| 2020–2021 | → Fernández Vial (loan) | 20 | (1) |
| 2021–2023 | Fernández Vial | 31 | (3) |
| 2023 | → Huachipato (loan) | 16 | (4) |
| 2024 | Huachipato | 11 | (0) |
| 2024–2026 | Independiente | 49 | (9) |
| 2026 | → Pisa (loan) | 11 | (1) |
| 2026– | Pisa | 1 | (0) |

International career^{‡}
| 2023 | Chile U23 | 4 | (0) |
| 2023– | Chile | 23 | (2) |
Medal record
Men's football
Representing Chile
Pan American Games
| Silver medal – second place | 2023 Santiago | Team |
- * Club domestic league appearances and goals as of 24 August 2026 ‡ National team caps and goals as of 21:30, 6 October 2026 (UTC)

Felipe Ignacio Loyola Olea (born 9 November 2000) is a Chilean professional footballer who plays as a midfielder for Serie B club Pisa and the Chile national team.

== Club career ==
=== Early career ===
Loyola is a youth product of Colo-Colo, and began his senior career on loan with Fernández Vial for the 2020 season. He helped them win the 2023 Segunda División Profesional de Chile, and signed permanently with the club afterwards in 2021.

=== Huachipato ===
In 2023, he was loaned to Huachipato with an option to buy, then he became a member of the Huachipato squad that won the 2023 Chilean Primera Division.

For the 2024 season, he was permanently transferred to Huachipato.

=== Independiente ===
In the second half of 2024, Loyola moved to Argentina and signed with Independiente with a four-year contract.

=== Pisa ===
On 22 January 2026, Loyola moved to Serie A club Pisa.

== Style of play ==
During his days in Huachipato Loyola played in the positions of right-back and center back, being renowned for his stamina and capacity to play full games without getting tired.

In Independiente he was fully converted to a box-to-box midfielder under Julio Vaccari on a 4-3-3 system. as a midfielder he made use of his physicality and stamina to fulfill many roles on the pitch, taking part on ball recovery, defense, conduction and goal scoring, while also fulfilling his classical right-back duties when needed.

== International career ==
Loyola was part of the Chile U23s at the 2023 Pan American Games that won the silver medal. He was called up to the senior Chile national team for a set of 2026 FIFA World Cup qualification matches in August 2023.

== Career statistics ==
=== Club ===
As of match played 16 September 2026

Appearances and goals by club, season and competition
| Club | Season | League | | | National Cup | | Continental | | Other | | Total | |
| Club | Season | Division | Apps | Goals | Apps | Goals | Apps | Goals | Apps | Goals | Apps | Goals |
|---|---|---|---|---|---|---|---|---|---|---|---|---|
| Colo-Colo | 2020 | Liga de Primera | 0 | 0 | 0 | 0 | 0 | 0 | 0 | 0 | 0 | 0 |
| Colo-Colo | 2021 | Liga de Primera | 0 | 0 | 0 | 0 | 0 | 0 | 0 | 0 | 0 | 0 |
| Colo-Colo | Total | | 0 | 0 | 0 | 0 | 0 | 0 | 0 | 0 | 0 | 0 |
| Fernández Vial (loan) | 2020 | Chilean Primera B | 20 | 1 | — | | — | | — | | 20 | 1 |
| Fernández Vial | 2021 | Chilean Primera B | 6 | 1 | 3 | 0 | — | | — | | 9 | 1 |
| Fernández Vial | 2022 | Chilean Primera B | 25 | 2 | 1 | 0 | — | | — | | 26 | 2 |
| Fernández Vial | Total | | 31 | 3 | 4 | 0 | — | | — | | 35 | 3 |
| Huachipato (loan) | 2023 | Liga de Primera | 16 | 4 | 2 | 0 | — | | — | | 18 | 4 |
| Huachipato | 2024 | Liga de Primera | 11 | 0 | 0 | 0 | 6 (Note: Five appearances and one goal in Copa Libertadores, one appearance in Copa Sudamericana) | 1 | 1 (Note: Appearance in Supercopa de Chile) | 0 | 18 | 1 |
| Independiente | 2024 | AFA Liga Profesional de Fútbol | 18 | 2 | 2 | 0 | — | | — | | 20 | 2 |
| Independiente | 2025 | AFA Liga Profesional de Fútbol | 34 | 7 | 3 | 0 | 8 (Note: Appearances in Copa Sudamericana) | 2 | — | | 45 | 9 |
| Independiente | Total | | 52 | 9 | 5 | 0 | 8 | 2 | — | | 65 | 11 |
| Pisa (loan) | 2025–26 | Serie A | 11 | 1 | — | | — | | — | | 11 | 1 |
| Pisa | 2026–26 | Serie B | 1 | 0 | 2 | 0 | — | | — | | 3 | 0 |
| career total | | | 142 | 18 | 13 | 0 | 14 | 3 | 1 | 0 | 170 | 21 |

=== International ===
As of match played 6 October 2026

Appearances and goals by national team and year
| National team | Year | Apps | Goals |
|---|---|---|---|
| Chile | 2023 | 3 | 0 |
| Chile | 2024 | 5 | 0 |
| Chile | 2025 | 8 | 1 |
| Chile | 2026 | 7 | 1 |
| Total | | 23 | 2 |

Scores and results list Chile's goal tally first, score column indicates score after each Loyola goal

| No. | Date | Venue | Opponent | Score | Result | Competition |
|---|---|---|---|---|---|---|
| 1 | 18 November 2025 | Fisht Olympic Stadium, Sochi, Russia | Peru | 1–1 | 2–1 | Friendly |
| 2 | 27 March 2026 | Eden Park, Auckland, New Zealand | Cape Verde | 3–2 | 4–2 | 2026 FIFA Series |

== Honours ==
Fernández Vial

- Segunda División Profesional de Chile: 2023

Huachipato

- Chilean Primera División: 2023

Chile U23

- Pan American Games Silver Medal: 2023
