= Bruno Gutiérrez =

Chilean footballer (born 2002)

Personal information
- Full name: Bruno Giuliano Gutiérrez Vilches
- Date of birth: 25 July 2002 (age 24)
- Place of birth: La Calera, Chile
- Height: 1.80 m (5 ft 11 in)
- Position: Defender

Team information
- Current team: Deportes La Serena (on loan from Colo-Colo)
- Number: 21

Youth career
- Colo-Colo
- 2020: → Bahia (loan)

Senior career*
Years	Team	Apps	(Gls)
2020–	Colo-Colo	34	(0)
2020–2021	→ Deportes Iquique (loan)	9	(0)
2026–	→ Deportes La Serena (loan)	0	(0)

International career^{‡}
2017	Chile U15		
2019	Chile U17	3	(0)
2020	Chile U20	2	(0)
2022–2023	Chile U23	4	(0)
Medal record
Men's football
Representing Chile
Pan American Games
Silver medal – second place	2023 Santiago	Team
- * Club domestic league appearances and goals as of 31 January 2026 ‡ National team caps and goals as of 5 November 2023

Bruno Giuliano Gutiérrez Vilches (born 25 July 2002) is a Chilean professional footballer who plays as a defender for Deportes La Serena on loan from Colo-Colo.

== Club career ==
Gutiérrez started his career with Colo-Colo, Chile's most successful team. For 2020, he was sent on loan to Brazilian side Bahia but soon returned to Colo-Colo at the request of head coach Gustavo Quinteros and due to the COVID-19 pandemic in Brazil. So, in November 2020 he was loaned to Chilean Primera División side Deportes Iquique until the end of the 2020 season, where he made his professional debut. Back in Colo-Colo, he made his debut at the senior level in a match against Ñublense on 1 May 2021. In 2026, he was loaned out to Deportes La Serena.

== International career ==
At an early age, he represented Chile at the under-15 level in the 2017 South American U-15 Championship and Chile U17 at the 2019 FIFA U-17 World Cup, playing three matches. In addition, he represented Chile U20 in a friendly tournament played in Teresópolis, Brazil called Granja Comary International Tournament, playing two matches against Bolivia U20 and Brazil U20.

Later, he was called up to the first training microcycle of the Chile senior team in 2021. In June 2022, he was called up to the future projection team into the Chile squad for both the match against South Korea and the Kirin Cup Soccer.

He represented Chile at under-23 level in a 1–0 win against Peru U23 on 31 August 2022, in the context of preparations for the 2023 Pan American Games. He was included in the final squad for the games, where Chile won the silver medal.

== Honours ==
Chile U23

- Pan American Games Silver Medal: 2023
