= Rafael Fernández (footballer) =

Mexican footballer (born 2000)

Personal information
- Full name: Rafael Eduardo Fernández Inzunza
- Date of birth: 5 August 2000 (age 26)
- Place of birth: Culiacán, Sinaloa, Mexico
- Height: 1.83 m (6 ft 0 in)
- Position: Centre-back

Team information
- Current team: Tijuana
- Number: 3

Youth career
- 2016–2018: Atlas
- 2018–2021: Querétaro
- 2021: → Petroleros SJC (loan)

Senior career*
Years	Team	Apps	(Gls)
2019–2023	Querétaro	18	(1)
2020	→ Sinaloa (loan)	5	(0)
2023–	Tijuana	99	(1)

International career
2023	Mexico U23	8	(0)
Medal record
Men's football
Representing Mexico
Pan American Games
Bronze medal – third place	2023 Santiago	Team
- * Club domestic league appearances and goals as of 20 November 2026

Rafael Eduardo Fernández Inzunza (born 5 August 2000) is a Mexican professional footballer who plays as a centre-back for Liga MX club Tijuana.

== Career statistics ==
=== Club ===
As of match played on 20 November 2026

Club	Season	League			Cup		Continental		Other		Total	
Club	Season	Division	Apps	Goals	Apps	Goals	Apps	Goals	Apps	Goals	Apps	Goals
Querétaro	2019–20	Liga MX	—		3	0	—		—		3	0
Querétaro	2022–23	Liga MX	18	1	—		—		—		18	1
Querétaro	Total		18	1	3	0	—		—		21	1
Sinaloa (loan)	2020–21	Liga de Expansión MX	5	0	—		—		—		5	0
Tijuana	2023–24	Liga MX	23	0	—		—		2 (Note: Appearances in Leagues Cup)	0	25	0
Tijuana	2024–25	Liga MX	29	0	—		—		2	0	31	0
Tijuana	2025–26	Liga MX	33	1	—		—		2	0	35	1
Tijuana	2026–27	Liga MX	14	0	—		—		2	0	16	0
Tijuana	Total		99	1	—		—		8	0	107	1
Career total			122	2	3	0	0	0	8	0	133	2

== Honours ==
Mexico U23

- Pan American Bronze Medal: 2023
