= César Pérez (footballer) =

Chilean footballer

Personal information
- Full name: César Ignacio Pérez Maldonado
- Date of birth: 29 November 2002 (age 23)
- Place of birth: Cerrillos, Santiago, Chile
- Height: 1.76 m (5 ft 9 in)
- Position: Midfielder

Team information
- Current team: Defensa y Justicia
- Number: 8

Youth career
- 2013–2019: Magallanes

Senior career*
Years	Team	Apps	(Gls)
2019–2022	Magallanes	42	(4)
2022–2024	Unión La Calera	59	(7)
2024–	Defensa y Justicia	49	(4)

International career^{‡}
2015	Chile U15	5	(1)
2019	Chile U17	11	(0)
2020	Chile U20	3	(0)
2022–	Chile U23	10	(1)
2023–	Chile	6	(0)
Medal record
Men's football
Representing Chile
Pan American Games
Silver medal – second place	2023 Santiago	Team
- * Club domestic league appearances and goals as of 23:12, 18 September 2026 (UTC) ‡ National team caps and goals as of 6 October 2026

César Ignacio Pérez Maldonado (born 29 November 2002) is a Chilean footballer who plays as a midfielder for Argentine club Defensa y Justicia and the Chile national team.

== Club career ==
Pérez came to Magallanes youth system in 2013 and joined the first team in 2019. After spending four seasons in the Primera B de Chile with Magallanes, for the 2022 season he moved to Unión La Calera in the Chilean Primera División.

In July 2024, Pérez moved to Argentina and signed with Defensa y Justicia.

== International career ==
At youth level, Pérez represented Chile at under-15 level in the 2017 South American Championship and Chile U17 at both the 2019 South American Championship, where Chile was the runner-up, and the 2019 FIFA World Cup.

At under-20 level, he represented Chile in the Granja Comary International Tournament, a friendly championship in Teresópolis, Brazil, playing all the matches against Peru U20, Bolivia U20, and Brazil U20.

On 31 August 2022, he represented Chile at under-23 level in a 1–0 win against Peru U23. He was included in the final squad for the 2023 Pan American Games, where Chile won the silver medal. In 2024, he took part in the Pre-Olympic Tournament.

At senior level, he was called up to the training microcycle in March 2021 of Chile by the coach Martín Lasarte along with his teammate Julián Alfaro. He received his first call-up for the friendly matches in June 2023 and made his debut in the 2026 FIFA World Cup qualifier against Ecuador on 21 November 2023 by replacing Erick Pulgar at the minute 70.

== Career statistics ==
=== International ===
As of match played 6 October 2026

Appearances and goals by national team and year
National team	Year	Apps	Goals
Chile	2023	1	0
Chile	2024	3	0
Chile	2026	2	0
Total		6	0

== Honours ==
Chile U23

- Pan American Games Silver Medal: 2023
