= Monzeglio =

Monzeglio is an Italian surname. Notable people with the surname include:

- Eraldo Monzeglio (1906 – 1981), Italian association football coach and player
- Manuel Monzeglio (born 2001), Uruguayan professional footballer
