= Matías Zaldivia =

Chilean footballer (born 1991)

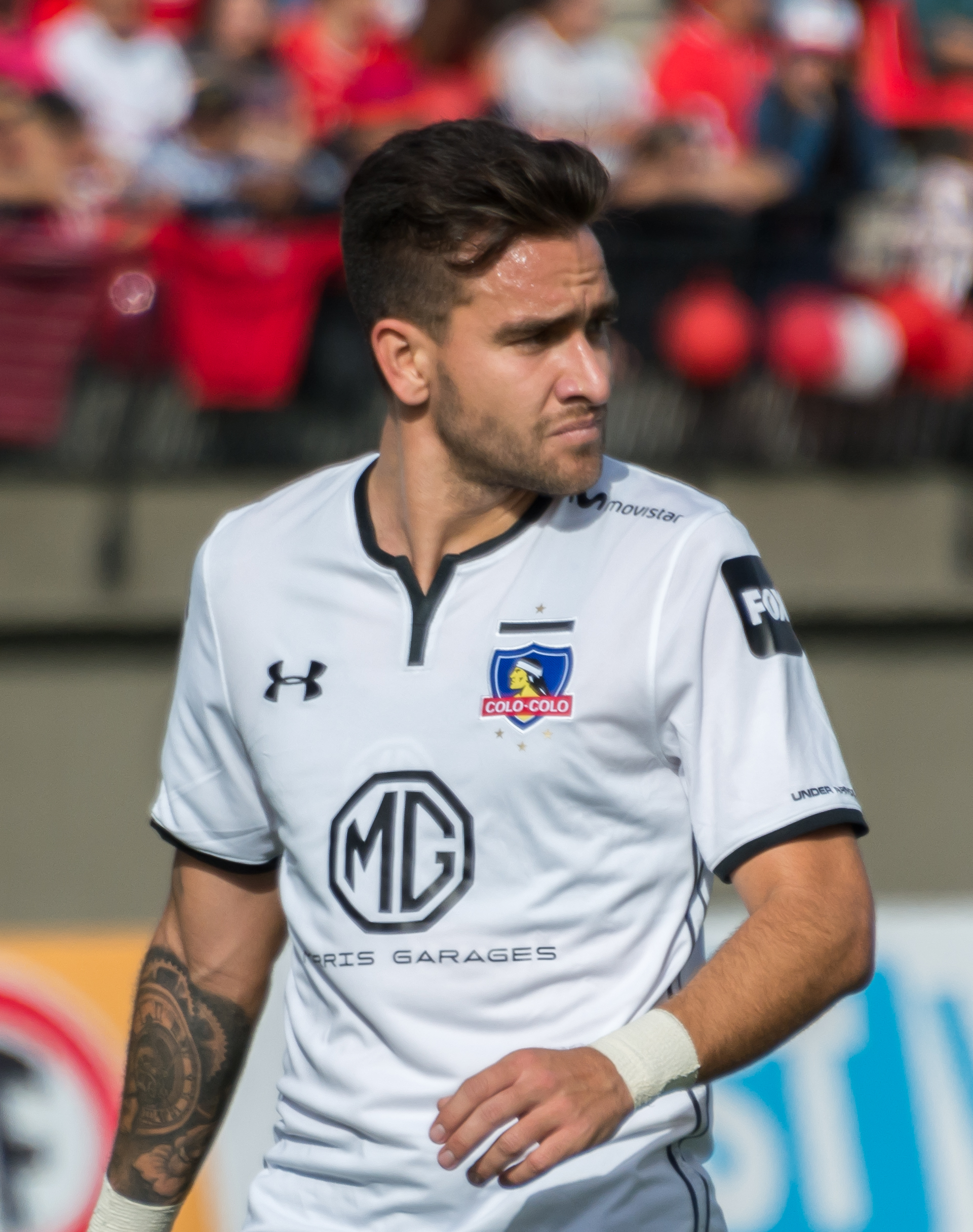
- Zaldivia with Colo Colo in 2018

Personal information
- Full name: Matías Ezequiel Zaldivia
- Date of birth: 22 January 1991 (age 35)
- Place of birth: San Isidro, Buenos Aires, Argentina
- Height: 1.85 m (6 ft 1 in)
- Position: Defender

Team information
- Current team: Universidad de Chile
- Number: 4

Youth career
- Chacarita Juniors

Senior career*
Years	Team	Apps	(Gls)
2010–2012	Chacarita Juniors	45	(0)
2012–2015	Arsenal de Sarandí	59	(1)
2016–2022	Colo-Colo	86	(5)
2023–	Universidad de Chile	62	(6)

International career^{‡}
2023	Chile U23	5	(0)
2023	Chile	1	(0)
Medal record
Men's football
Representing Chile
Pan American Games
Silver medal – second place	2023 Santiago	Team
- * Club domestic league appearances and goals as of 23:36, 12 July 2025 (UTC) ‡ National team caps and goals as of 5 November 2023

Matías Ezequiel Zaldivia (born 22 January 1991) is a professional footballer who plays as a defender for Chilean Primera División team Universidad de Chile. Born in Argentina, he played for the Chile national team.

== Club career ==
Zaldivia made his professional debut for Chacarita Juniors in 2010.

== International career ==
After taking part in a training microcycle of the Chile squad at under-23 level, he made his international debut in the friendly match against Cuba on 11 June 2023.

He was called up to the Chile under-23 squad for the 2023 Pan American Games as an overage player alongside Brayan Cortés and César Fuentes, where Chile won the silver medal.

== Personal life ==
In December 2021, he acquired the Chilean nationality by residence along with his colleague Diego Buonanotte, keeping the Argentine nationality.

== Career statistics ==
=== International ===
As of match played 11 June 2023

Appearances and goals by national team and year
National team	Year	Apps	Goals
Chile	2023	1	0
Total		1	0

== Honours ==
Arsenal de Sarandí

- Copa Argentina: 2012-13
- Supercopa Argentina: 2012

Colo-Colo

- Primera División: 2017 Transición
- Copa Chile: 2016
- Supercopa de Chile (2): 2017, 2018

Universidad de Chile

- Copa Chile: 2024
- Supercopa de Chile: 2025

Chile U23 (Note: overage player)

- Pan American Games Silver Medal: 2023

Individual

- Chilean Primera División Ideal Team (2): 2024, 2025
