= Martín Gianoli =

Uruguayan footballer (born 2000)

Personal information
- Full name: Martín Germán Gianoli Abellán
- Date of birth: 27 September 2000 (age 26)
- Place of birth: Montevideo, Uruguay
- Height: 1.95 m (6 ft 5 in)
- Position: Defender

Team information
- Current team: Cerro Largo (on loan from Peñarol)
- Number: 32

Youth career
- 2016–2020: River Plate (Montevideo)

Senior career*
Years	Team	Apps	(Gls)
2020–2021	Montijo	26	(2)
2022–2023	Cerro Largo	57	(3)
2024–	Peñarol	6	(0)
2025–	→ Cerro Largo (loan)	16	(0)

International career
2023	Uruguay U23	2	(0)
- * Club domestic league appearances and goals as of 1 October 2025

Martín Germán Gianoli Abellán (born 27 September 2000) is a Uruguayan professional footballer who plays as a defender for Cerro Largo, on loan from Peñarol.

A youth player at River Plate (Montevideo), where he did not make a first-team appearance, he began his senior career with Montijo in Spain's Tercera División before returning to the Uruguayan Primera División in 2022 with Cerro Largo. In 2024, he signed for Peñarol and won the league in his first season.

== Club career ==
=== River Plate Montevideo ===
Gianoli was born in Montevideo. His father, Gabriel Gianoli, is a member of the General Assembly of Uruguay for the National Party. After playing for youth teams, Gianoli was signed by River Plate (Montevideo). A growth spurt to over 1.95 metres at age 15 led to him briefly being tried out as a forward before being returning to defence. In his final season, 2019–20, he trained with the main squad but played in the third team; he did not play a first-team match in his four years at the club. Manager Jorge Fossati then released him.

=== Montijo ===
Gianoli travelled to Spain and signed for UD Montijo in the town of the same name with 15,000 inhabitants in Extremadura. Playing in the fourth-tier Tercera División, he played 25 games in 2020–21 and scored two headers as the team went on to win promotion via the play-offs. His latter goal on 2 March 2021 won the game at home to Moralo CP on the last day of the campaign, thus winning the group and making post-season. He signed a two-year contract in July, and left in January 2022.

=== Cerro Largo ===
Gianoli signed for Cerro Largo F.C. in the Uruguayan Primera División ahead of the 2022 season. He played 25 games that campaign and scored once, in a 2–1 home loss to Liverpool F.C. (Montevideo) on 28 May. He was sent off on 29 April 2023 in a goalless game at Cerro, after a video assistant referee decision against his tackle. On 26 August, he scored the opening goal of a 2–2 draw with Nacional also at the Estadio Arquitecto Antonio Eleuterio Ubilla.

=== Peñarol ===
On 30 January 2024, Gianoli transferred to Peñarol in the same league on a two-year contract. The club paid US$100,000 for 30% of his economic rights. He made his debut on 24 February in the second game of the season, playing the last 15 minutes as a substitute in a 2–0 home win over Miramar Misiones. Peñarol finished the season as league winners without the need for a final, as they won the Apertura (without losing a game) and the Clausura tournaments.

== International career ==
Gianoli was part of the Uruguay under-23 team that took part in the football event at the 2023 Pan American Games in Chile. He played two games, including the penalty shootout win over Colombia that sealed fifth place.

== Honours ==
Peñarol

- Uruguayan Primera División: 2024
