= Raymundo Fulgencio =

Mexican footballer (born 2000)

Personal information
- Full name: Raymundo de Jesús Fulgencio Román
- Date of birth: 12 February 2000 (age 26)
- Place of birth: Heroica Veracruz, Veracruz, Mexico
- Height: 1.75 m (5 ft 9 in)
- Position: Winger

Team information
- Current team: Juárez
- Number: 7

Senior career*
Years	Team	Apps	(Gls)
2019–2020	Veracruz	2	(0)
2020–2025	UANL	86	(5)
2024	→ Atlas (loan)	34	(1)
2025–	Juárez	30	(1)

International career
2023	Mexico U23	9	(1)
Medal record
Men's football
Representing Mexico
Pan American Games
Bronze medal – third place	2023 Santiago	Team
- * Club domestic league appearances and goals as of 27 September 2026

Raymundo de Jesús Fulgencio Román (born 12 February 2000) is a Mexican professional footballer who plays as a winger for Liga MX club Juárez.

== Career statistics ==
=== Club ===
As of match played on 27 September 2026

Club	Season	League			Cup		Continental		Global		Other		Total	
Club	Season	Division	Apps	Goals	Apps	Goals	Apps	Goals	Apps	Goals	Apps	Goals	Apps	Goals
Veracruz	2018–19	Liga MX	—		4	0	—		—		—		4	0
Veracruz	2019–20	Liga MX	2	0	2	0	—		—		—		4	0
Veracruz	Total		2	0	6	0	—		—		—		8	0
Tigres UANL	2019–20	Liga MX	5	0	—		3 (Note: Appearances in CONCACAF Champions League)	0	—		—		8	0
Tigres UANL	2020–21	Liga MX	10	0	—		—		2 (Note: Appearances in FIFA Club World Cup)	0	1 (Note: Appearances in Leagues Cup)	0	13	0
Tigres UANL	2021–22	Liga MX	20	1	—		—		—		—		20	1
Tigres UANL	2022–23	Liga MX	30	1	3 (Note: Two appearances in Copa Sky por México and one in Campeón de Campeones)	0	2	1	—		—		35	2
Tigres UANL	2023–24	Liga MX	15	3	—		—		—		1	0	16	3
Tigres UANL	2024–25	Liga MX	6	0	—		2	0	—		—		8	0
Tigres UANL	Total		86	5	3	0	7	1	2	0	2	0	100	6
Atlas (loan)	2023–24	Liga MX	15	0	—		—		—		—		15	0
Atlas (loan)	2024–25	Liga MX	19	1	—		—		—		3	0	22	1
Atlas (loan)	Total		34	1	—		—		—		3	0	37	1
Juárez	2025–26	Liga MX	26	1	—		—		—		2	0	28	1
Juárez	2026–27	Liga MX	4	0	—		—		—		3	0	8	0
Juárez	Total		30	1	—		—		—		5	0	35	1
Career total			152	7	9	0	7	1	2	0	10	0	180	8

== Honours ==
Tigres UANL

- Liga MX: Clausura 2023
- Campeón de Campeones: 2023
- CONCACAF Champions League: 2020

Mexico U23

- Pan American Bronze Medal: 2023
