= Lucas Assadi =

Chilean footballer (born 2004)

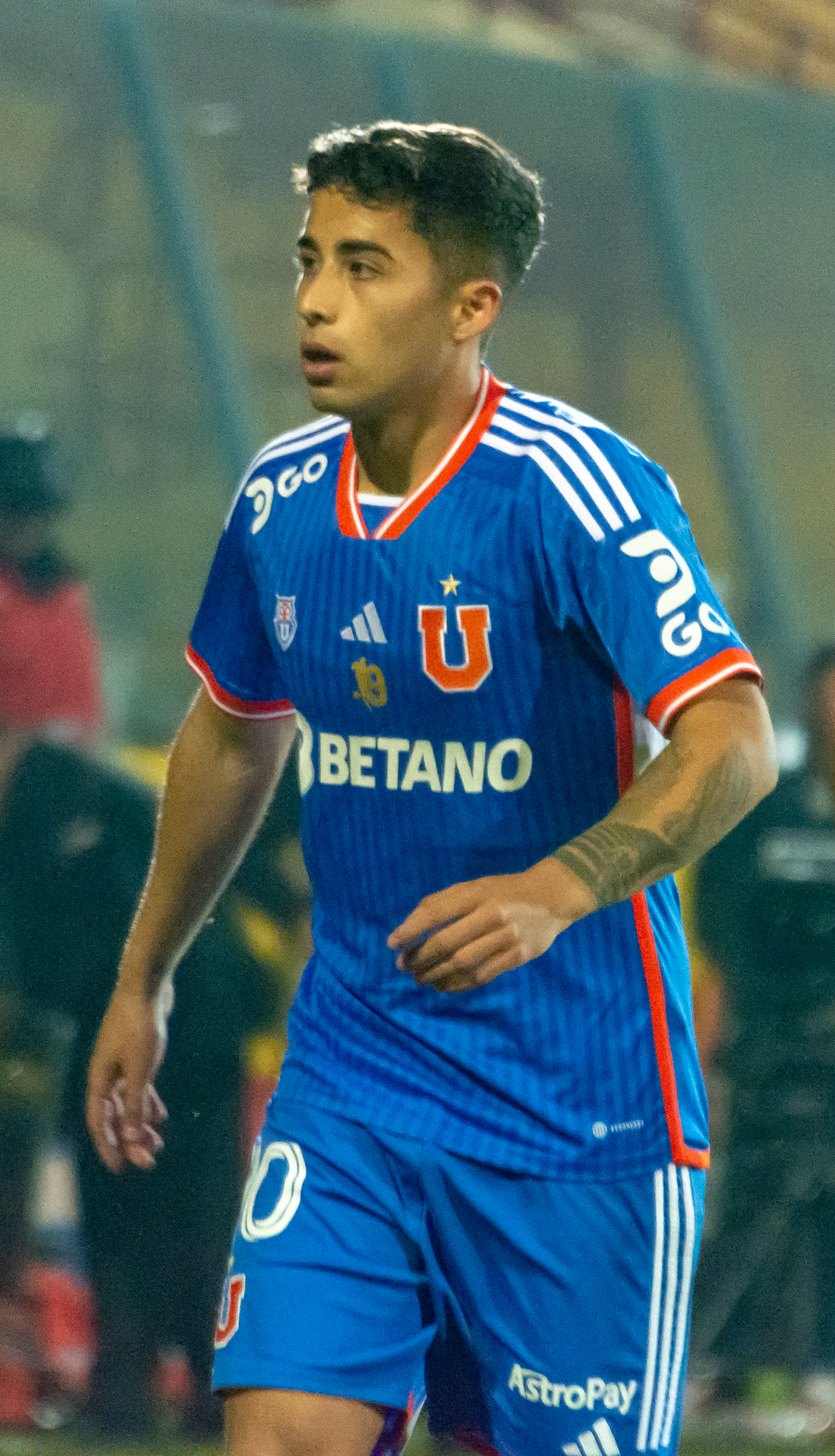
- Assadi with Universidad de Chile in 2023

Personal information
- Full name: Lucas Humberto Assadi Reygadas
- Date of birth: 8 January 2004 (age 22)
- Place of birth: Puente Alto, Santiago, Chile
- Height: 1.72 m (5 ft 8 in)
- Position: Forward

Team information
- Current team: AIK
- Number: 10

Youth career
- 2011–2021: Universidad de Chile

Senior career*
Years	Team	Apps	(Gls)
2021–2026	Universidad de Chile	116	(9)
2026–	AIK	0	(0)

International career^{‡}
2019	Chile U15	23	(7)
2019	Chile U17	1	(0)
2022–2023	Chile U20	7	(2)
2022–	Chile U23	7	(2)
2022–	Chile	6	(0)
Medal record
Men's football
Representing Chile
Pan American Games
Silver medal – second place	2023 Santiago	Team
- * Club domestic league appearances and goals as of 21 August 2026 ‡ National team caps and goals as of 21 August 2026

Lucas Humberto Assadi Reygadas (born 8 January 2004) is a Chilean professional footballer who plays as a forward for Swedish club AIK.

== Club career ==
In 2011, Assadi came to Universidad de Chile and made his professional debut at the age of 17 in a 2021 Copa Chile match against San Luis de Quillota on June 27, 2021.

On 27 August 2026, Assadi signed with Swedish club AIK on a deal until December 2030.

== International career ==
Born in Chile, he is of Palestinian descent from his Arab surname and thus available to represent Palestine alongside his birth country Chile. It has been incorrectly claimed in Iranian media that Assadi is of Iranian descent, though there is no confirmation. He took part of the Chile U15 squad at the UEFA U-16 Development Tournament in Finland in April 2019. and also represented Chile U15 at the 2019 South American U-15 Championship, scoring two goals. Prior to this, he represented Chile U17 at the 2019 FIFA U-17 World Cup, making an appearance in the match against France U17. In 2022, he represented Chile U20 in a friendly match against Paraguay U20 and against Peru U20. In 2023, he made four appearances and scored one goal in the South American U20 Championship.

He represented Chile at under-23 level in a 1–0 win against Peru U23 on 31 August 2022, in the context of preparations for the 2023 Pan American Games. He was included in the final squad for the games, where Chile won the silver medal.

In 2024, he took part in the Pre-Olympic Tournament.

== Personal life ==
His older brother, Matías, is a football referee who made his professional debut in a Segunda División Profesional de Chile match in March 2023.

== Career statistics ==
=== Club ===
As of match played 31 August 2025

Appearances and goals by club, season and competition
Club	Season	League			Cup		Continental		Other		Total	
Club	Season	Division	Apps	Goals	Apps	Goals	Apps	Goals	Apps	Goals	Apps	Goals
Universidad de Chile	2021	Chilean Primera División	7	0	2	0	0	0	0	0	9	0
Universidad de Chile	2022	Chilean Primera División	27	1	7	0	0	0	0	0	34	1
Universidad de Chile	2023	Chilean Primera División	25	3	2	1	0	0	0	0	27	4
Universidad de Chile	2024	Chilean Primera División	22	1	9	3	—		—		31	4
Universidad de Chile	2025	Chilean Primera División	14	4	5	1	5 (Note: One appearance in Copa Libertadores, four appearances and four goals in Copa Sudamericana)	4	—		24	9
Universidad de Chile	Total		95	9	25	8	5	1	0	0	125	18
Career total			95	9	25	8	5	1	0	0	125	18

=== International ===
As of match played 9 September 2025.

Appearances and goals by national team and year
National team	Year	Apps	Goals
Chile	2022	1	0
Chile	2023	1	0
Chile	2025	2	0
Total		4	0

== Honours ==
Universidad de Chile

- Copa Chile: 2024
- Supercopa de Chile: 2025

Chile U23

- Pan American Games Silver Medal: 2023

Individual

- Chilean Primera División Ideal Team: 2025
