= Michel (footballer, born 2003) =

Brazilian footballer

Personal information
- Full name: Michel Augusto Modesto Rafael dos Santos
- Date of birth: 20 May 2003 (age 23)
- Place of birth: Avaré, Brazil
- Height: 1.88 m (6 ft 2 in)
- Position: Centre-back

Team information
- Current team: Neftchi Fergana
- Number: 3

Youth career
- 2019–2023: Palmeiras

Senior career*
Years	Team	Apps	(Gls)
2021–2026	Palmeiras	4	(0)
2025–2026	→ Moreirense (loan)	9	(0)
2026–	Neftchi Fergana	0	(0)

International career
2023	Brazil U23	4	(0)
Medal record
Men's football
Representing Brazil
Pan American Games
Winner	2023 Santiago
- * Club domestic league appearances and goals as of 9 September 2026

Michel Augusto Modesto Rafael dos Santos (born 20 May 2003), known as Michel, is a Brazilian professional footballer who plays as a centre-back for Uzbekistan Super League club Neftchi Fergana.

== Club career ==
Michel made his Serie A debut for Palmeiras on the 1st of December 2021, starting for the club against Cuiabá, and going on to play the full 90 minutes of this 3–1 away win.

In a Palmeiras side that had just won its second Copa Libertadores in a row while already being out of the race for the 2021 Serie A title, Michel became known as one of Palmeiras' most promising prospects, starting the last three championship games of the season as a central defender in Abel Ferreira's 3-4-3 system.

On 8 September 2026, Michel moved to Uzbekistan and signed with Neftchi Fergana.
