= Maximiliano Guerrero =

Chilean footballer (born 2000)

Personal information
- Full name: Maximiliano Gabriel Guerrero Peña
- Date of birth: 15 January 2000 (age 26)
- Place of birth: La Serena, Chile
- Height: 1.70 m (5 ft 7 in)
- Position: Right winger

Team information
- Current team: Universidad de Chile
- Number: 7

Youth career
- 2015–2016: Deportes La Serena
- 2016–2019: Universidad de Chile

Senior career*
Years	Team	Apps	(Gls)
2019–2021	Universidad de Chile	0	(0)
2019	→ Deportes La Serena (loan)	1	(0)
2020–2021	→ Rangers (loan)	6	(0)
2021–2023	Deportes La Serena	55	(9)
2024–	Universidad de Chile	34	(6)

International career^{‡}
2017	Chile U17	3	(0)
2023	Chile U23	5	(2)
2023–	Chile	3	(0)
Medal record
Men's football
Representing Chile
Pan American Games
Silver medal – second place	2023 Santiago	Team
- * Club domestic league appearances and goals as of 12 July 2025 ‡ National team caps and goals as of 23:28, 19 November 2024 (UTC)

Maximiliano Gabriel Guerrero Peña (born 15 January 2000), also known as Maxi Guerrero, is a Chilean footballer who plays as a right winger for Universidad de Chile and the Chile national team.

== Club career ==
Born in La Serena, Chile, Guerrero was with his hometown's club, Deportes La Serena before joining the Universidad de Chile youth system at the age of sixteen.

In 2019, he returned on loan to Deportes La Serena, suffering an ACL injury in his professional debut against Deportes Copiapó. The next season, he was loaned to Rangers de Talca.

In 2021, he rejoined Deportes La Serena in co-ownership with Universidad de Chile. He scored his first goal in the match against Everton on 30 April. In 2022, he suffered a second serious injury by meniscus tear. After getting over the injury, he reached consistency.

For the 2024 season, he rejoined Universidad de Chile.

== International career ==
In 2017, Guerrero represented Chile U17 in friendlies against the United States and the FIFA World Cup.

In 2023, he has been with the Chile under-23 squad in training microcycles. He was included in the final squad for the 2023 Pan American Games, where Chile won the silver medal.

At senior level, he received his first call up for the 2026 FIFA World Cup qualifiers against Uruguay and Colombia in September 2023 and made his debut against Paraguay on 16 November 2023 by replacing Víctor Dávila at the minute 78.

== Style of play ==
Mainly a wide midfielder, he has turned into a right winger, more inclined to an offensive position. He also has played as a right-back in his stint with Rangers.

== Personal life ==
He is the son of the former football defender Vladimir Guerrero, who also played for Deportes La Serena.

== Career statistics ==
=== International ===
As of match played 19 November 2024

Appearances and goals by national team and year
National team	Year	Apps	Goals
Chile	2023	1	0
Chile	2024	2	0
Total		3	0

== Honours ==
Universidad de Chile

- Copa Chile: 2024
- Supercopa de Chile: 2025

Chile U23

- Pan American Games Silver Medal: 2023

Individual

- Chilean Primera División Team of the Season: 2024
