= Jordán Carrillo =

Mexican footballer (born 2001)

Personal information
- Full name: Jordán Carrillo Rodríguez
- Date of birth: 30 November 2001 (age 24)
- Place of birth: Culiacán, Sinaloa, Mexico
- Height: 1.68 m (5 ft 6 in)
- Positions: Attacking midfielder; winger

Team information
- Current team: Guadalajara
- Number: 33

Youth career
- 2012–2014: Monterrey
- 2016–2020: Santos Laguna

Senior career*
Years	Team	Apps	(Gls)
2020–2026	Santos Laguna	89	(3)
2022–2023	→ Sporting Gijón (loan)	22	(1)
2026	→ UNAM (loan)	22	(6)
2026–	Guadalajara	11	(1)

International career^{‡}
2018	Mexico U18	1	(1)
2021	Mexico U21	1	(0)
2023	Mexico U23	12	(3)
2022–2024	Mexico	2	(0)
Medal record
Men's football
Representing Mexico
Pan American Games
Bronze medal – third place	2023 Santiago	Team
Central American and Caribbean Games
Gold medal – first place	2023 San Salvador	Team
- * Club domestic league appearances and goals as of 8 November 2026 ‡ National team caps and goals as of 31 May 2024

Jordán Carrillo Rodríguez (born 30 November 2001) is a Mexican professional footballer who plays as an attacking midfielder or winger for Liga MX club Guadalajara.

== Club career ==
Carrillo made his first team debut for Santos Laguna on 22 January 2020, in a Copa MX match against Pumas UNAM. On 25 July 2020, he made his league debut against Cruz Azul.

In July 2022, Carrillo joined Segunda División club Sporting Gijón on a season-long loan.

In December 2025, Carrillo joined Pumas UNAM on loan, becoming a fundamental piece to help the team reach the Clausura 2026 championship final.

On 17 June 2026, Carrillo signed with Guadalajara.

== International career ==
Carrillo received his first call-up to the senior national team by manager Gerardo Martino, and made his debut on 27 April 2022 in a friendly match against Guatemala, coming in as a substitute in the 72nd minute for Alejandro Zendejas.

== Career statistics ==
=== Club ===
As of match played on 8 November 2026

Club	Season	League			Cup (Note: Includes Copa MX and Copa del Rey)		Continental		Other		Total	
Club	Season	Division	Apps	Goals	Apps	Goals	Apps	Goals	Apps	Goals	Apps	Goals
Santos Laguna	2019–20	Liga MX	—		1	0	—		—		1	0
Santos Laguna	2020–21	Liga MX	6	0	—		—		—		6	0
Santos Laguna	2021–22	Liga MX	26	2	—		1 (Note: Appearance in CONCACAF Champions League)	0	2 (Note: Appearances in Leagues Cup)	0	29	2
Santos Laguna	2022–23	Liga MX	3	0	—		—		—		3	0
Santos Laguna	2023–24	Liga MX	15	1	—		—		—		15	1
Santos Laguna	2024–25	Liga MX	26	0	—		—		3	0	29	0
Santos Laguna	2025–26	Liga MX	13	0	—		—		3	1	16	1
Santos Laguna	Total		89	3	1	0	1	0	8	1	99	4
Sporting Gijón (loan)	2022–23	Segunda División	21	1	3	0	—		—		24	1
Sporting Gijón (loan)	2023–24	Segunda División	1	0	1	0	—		—		2	0
Sporting Gijón (loan)	Total		22	1	4	0	—		—		26	1
Pumas UNAM (loan)	2025–26	Liga MX	22	6	—		2	0	—		24	6
Guadalajara	2026–27	Liga MX	11	1	—		—		2	0	13	1
Career total			144	11	5	0	3	0	10	1	161	13

=== International ===
National team	Year	Apps	Goals
Mexico	2022	1	0
Mexico	2023	0	0
Mexico	2024	1	0
Total		2	0

== Honours ==
Mexico U23

- Central American and Caribbean Games: 2023
- Pan American Bronze Medal: 2023

Individual

- Liga MX All-Star: 2022
- Pan American Games top scorer: 2023 (shared)
- Liga MX Best Rookie: 2021–22
- Liga MX Best XI: Clausura 2026
