= Alexander Aravena =

Chilean footballer (born 2002)

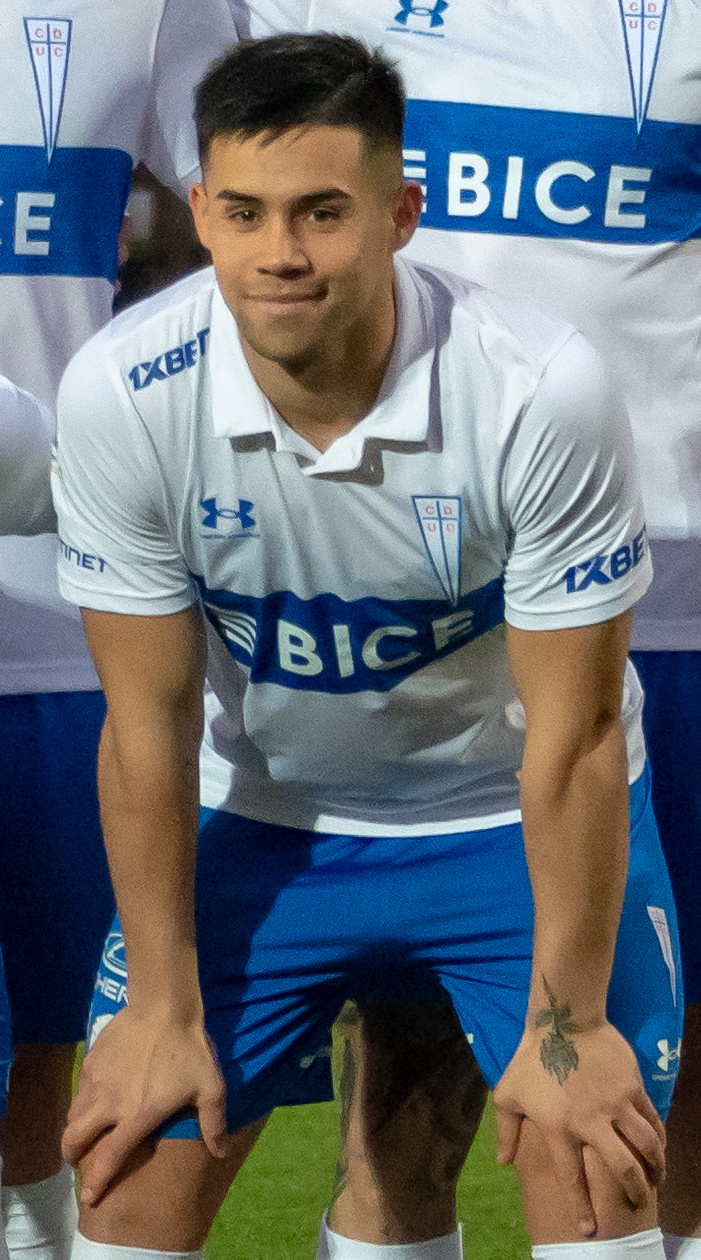
- Aravena with Universidad Católica in 2023

Personal information
- Full name: Alexander Ernesto Aravena Guzmán
- Date of birth: 6 September 2002 (age 24)
- Place of birth: Huechuraba, Santiago, Chile
- Height: 1.74 m (5 ft 9 in)
- Position: Forward

Team information
- Current team: Portland Timbers (on loan from Grêmio)
- Number: 28

Youth career
- 2010–2020: Universidad Católica

Senior career*
Years	Team	Apps	(Gls)
2020–2024	Universidad Católica	46	(16)
2022	→ Ñublense (loan)	30	(11)
2024–	Grêmio	50	(6)
2026–	→ Portland Timbers (loan)	12	(0)

International career^{‡}
2018–2019	Chile U17	13	(5)
2022–	Chile U23	10	(3)
2023–	Chile	16	(0)
Medal record
Men's football
Representing Chile
Pan American Games
Silver medal – second place	2023 Santiago	Team
- * Club domestic league appearances and goals as of 20 June 2026 ‡ National team caps and goals as of 18 November 2025

Alexander Ernesto Aravena Guzmán (born 6 September 2002) is a Chilean professional footballer who plays as a forward for American club Portland Timbers, on loan from Brazilian club Grêmio, and the Chile national team.

== Club career ==
Aravena debuted the year 2020 in the match against Huachipato in the Estadio San Carlos de Apoquindo, on the following date.

In the second half of 2024, Aravena moved abroad and joined Brazilian club Grêmio on a deal until the end of 2028.

On 25 February 2026, Aravena joined American club Portland Timbers on a loan for a season with a purchase option.

== International career ==
He represented Chile at under-23 level in a 1–0 win against Peru U23, where he scored the goal, on 31 August 2022, in the context of preparations for the 2023 Pan American Games. He was included in the final squad for the games, where Chile won the silver medal.

In 2024, he took part in the Pre-Olympic Tournament.

== Personal life ==
On 27 December 2025, Aravena married the Chilean Jael de la Paz.

== Career statistics ==
=== Club ===
As of 9 November 2025

Club	Season	League			National Cup		Continental		Other		Total	
Club	Season	Division	Apps	Goals	Apps	Goals	Apps	Goals	Apps	Goals	Apps	Goals
Universidad Católica	2020	Primera División	4	0	—		—		—		4	0
Universidad Católica	2021	Primera División	1	0	—		—		—		1	0
Universidad Católica	2023	Primera División	28	13	5	1	1 (Note: Appearance(s) in the Copa Sudamericana)	0	—		34	14
Universidad Católica	2024	Primera División	13	3	3	0	1	0	—		17	3
Universidad Católica	Total club		46	16	8	1	2	0	0	0	46	17
Ñublense (loan)	2022	Primera División	30	11	6	1	2	0	—		38	12
Grêmio	2024	Série A	16	2	0	0	0	0	—		16	2
Grêmio	2025	Série A	20	2	2	0	5	1	8 (Note: Appearances in Campeonato Gaúcho)	1	35	4
Grêmio	Total		36	4	2	0	5	1	8	1	51	6
Career total			112	31	16	2	9	1	8	1	145	35

=== International ===
As of match played 18 November 2025

Appearances and goals by national team and year
National team	Year	Apps	Goals
Chile	2023	9	0
Chile	2024	2	0
Chile	2025	6	0
Total		17	0

== Honours ==
Universidad Católica

- Primera División de Chile: 2020, 2021
- Supercopa de Chile: 2020, 2021

Grêmio

- Recopa Gaúcha: 2025

Chile U23

- Pan American Games Silver Medal: 2023

Individual

- Chilean Primera División Best U-21 Player: 2022
- Chilean Primera División Team of the Season: 2022
