= César Fuentes =

Chilean footballer (born 1993)

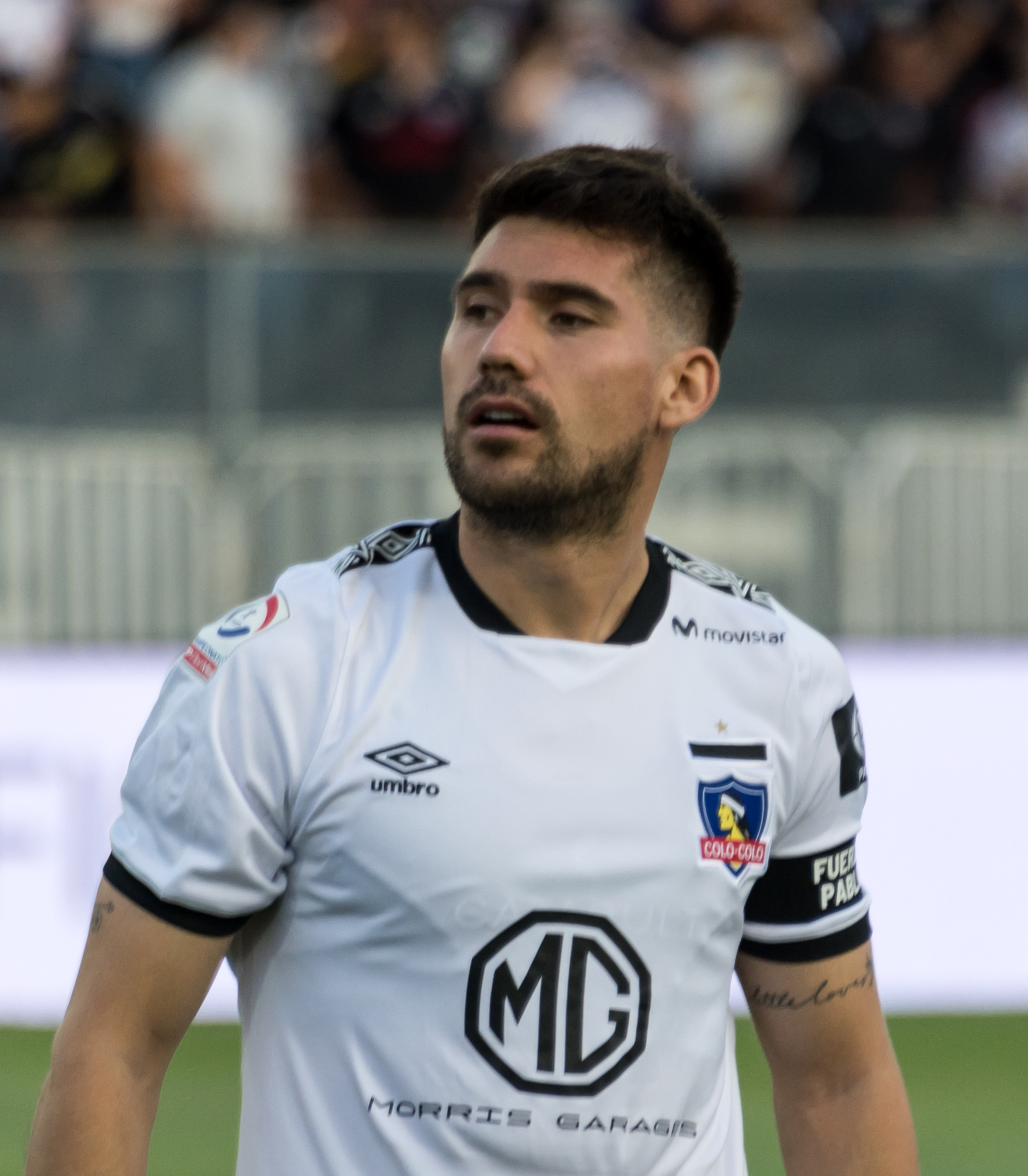
- Fuentes with Colo-Colo in 2020

Personal information
- Full name: César Nicolás Fuentes González
- Date of birth: 12 April 1993 (age 33)
- Place of birth: Rancagua, Chile
- Height: 1.72 m (5 ft 8 in)
- Position: Midfielder

Team information
- Current team: Deportes Limache

Youth career
- 2009–2011: O'Higgins

Senior career*
Years	Team	Apps	(Gls)
2012–2015	O'Higgins	105	(1)
2015–2019	Universidad Católica	97	(5)
2020–2024	Colo-Colo	103	(7)
2025	Deportes Iquique	26	(0)
2026–	Deportes Limache	26	(0)

International career^{‡}
2012–2013	Chile U20	20	(0)
2023	Chile U23 (O.P.)	5	(1)
Medal record
Men's football
Representing Chile
Pan American Games
Silver medal – second place	2023 Santiago	Team
- * Club domestic league appearances and goals as of 26 December 2025 ‡ National team caps and goals as of 5 November 2023

César Nicolás Fuentes González (Spanish pronunciation: [ˈsesaɾ ˈfwentes], born 12 April 1993) is a Chilean footballer who plays as a midfielder for Deportes Limache.

== Career ==
=== Youth career ===
Fuentes started his career at Primera División de Chile club O'Higgins. He progressed from the under categories club all the way to the senior team.

=== O'Higgins ===
In 2012, Fuentes was runner-up with O'Higgins, after lose the final against Universidad de Chile in the penalty shoot-out.

Fuentes won the Apertura 2013-14 with O'Higgins. In the tournament, he played in 15 of 18 matches.

In 2014, he won the Supercopa de Chile against Deportes Iquique, playing the 90 minutes of this match that O'Higgins won at the penalty shoot-out.

He participated with the club in the 2014 Copa Libertadores where they faced Deportivo Cali, Cerro Porteño and Lanús, being third and being eliminated in the group stage.

=== Universidad Catolica ===
On 12 June 2015, Fuentes signed for 4 years with Universidad Católica.

=== Colo Colo ===
On 17 December 2019, Fuentes signs a contract with Colo Colo on a loan term with probable buyout.

=== Deportes Iquique ===
Fuentes joined Deportes Iquique for the 2025 season.

=== Deportes Limache ===
On 27 December 2025, Fuentes signed with Deportes Limache.

== International career ==
He was part of the Chile national under-20 football team, who played the 2013 South American Youth Championship in Argentina and joined the first team for the 2013 FIFA U-20 World Cup based in Turkey, where they reached the quarter-finals.

He was called up to the Chile under-23 squad for the 2023 Pan American Games as an overage player alongside Brayan Cortés and Matías Zaldivia. He made five appearances and scored one goal, winning the silver medal

At senior level, he was a substitute player in the 2026 World Cup qualification match against Venezuela on 17 October 2023.

== Honors ==
O'Higgins

- Primera División de Chile (1): 2013–A
- Supercopa de Chile (1): 2014

Universidad Católica

- Primera División de Chile (4): 2016–A, 2016–C, 2018, 2019
- Supercopa de Chile (2): 2016, 2019

Colo-Colo

- Primera División de Chile (2): 2022, 2024
- Copa Chile (2): 2021, 2023
- Supercopa de Chile (2): 2022, 2024

Chile U23 (Note: overage player)

- Pan American Games Silver Medal: 2023

Individual

- Medalla Santa Cruz de Triana: 2014
