= Pablo Rodríguez (footballer, born 2006) =

Chilean footballer

- Rodríguez with Coquimbo Unido in 2026

Personal information
- Full name: Pablo Roberto Andrés Rodríguez Salgado
- Date of birth: 10 November 2006 (age 20)
- Place of birth: San Felipe, Chile
- Height: 1.73 m (5 ft 8 in)
- Position: Attacking midfielder

Team information
- Current team: Coquimbo Unido (on loan from Unión San Felipe)
- Number: 18

Youth career
- Deportivo San Carlos
- 2019–2024: Unión San Felipe

Senior career*
Years	Team	Apps	(Gls)
2025–	Unión San Felipe	26	(4)
2026–	→ Coquimbo Unido (loan)	12	(2)
- * Club domestic league appearances and goals as of 17 June 2026

Pablo Roberto Andrés Rodríguez Salgado (born 10 November 2006) is a Chilean footballer who plays as an attacking midfielder for Chilean Primera División club Coquimbo Unido on loan from Unión San Felipe.

== Club career ==
Born in San Felipe, Chile, Rodríguez was with Deportivo San Carlos before joining the Unión San Felipe at the age of 12 and was promoted to the first team in 2025. He made his senior debut in the Copa Chile matches against Colo-Colo and Santiago Wanderers in February 2025 and scored his first two goals in the 3–0 home victory against Cobreloa on 12 July 2025.

A regular player for Unión San Felipe, Rodríguez was loaned out to Chilean Primera División champions Coquimbo Unido for the 2026 season, winning the 2026 Supercopa de Chile and taking part in the 2026 Copa Libertadores.

== International career ==
Rodríguez was called up to a training microcycle of Chile U23 under Nicolás Córdova in July 2026.

== Honours ==
Coquimbo Unido

- Supercopa de Chile: 2026
- Copa de La Liga: 2026
