= Chile Olympic football team =

National association football team

Chile Olympic
- Association: Federación de Fútbol de Chile (FFCh)
- Confederation: CONMEBOL (South America)
- Head coach: Nicolas Cordova (interim)
- Top scorer: Iván Zamorano (5)
- Home stadium: Estadio Nacional Julio Martínez Prádanos
- FIFA code: CHI
First colours	Second colours

First international
- Egypt 5–4 Chile (Helsinki, Finland; 16 July 1952)

Biggest win
- Chile 5–0 Dominican Republic (Viña del Mar, Chile; 29 October 2023)

Biggest defeat
- Argentina 6–0 Chile (Buenos Aires, Argentina; 22 December 1959)

Olympic Games
- Appearances: 4 (first in 1928)
- Best result: (bronze) Bronze medalists (2000)

Pan American Games
- Appearances: 6 (first in 1951)
- Best result: (silver) Silver medalists (1987, 2023)
Medal record
Olympic Games
Bronze medal – third place	2000 Sydney	Team
Pan American Games
Silver medal – second place	1987 Indianapolis	Team
Silver medal – second place	2023 Santiago	Team

The Chile Olympic football team (also known as Chile under-23, Chile U-23) represents Chile in international football competitions at the Olympic Games and Pan American Games. Since the 1992 tournament, the team is limited to players under the age of 23, except three overage players. The team is controlled by the Federación de Fútbol de Chile (FFCh). Combined with pre-1992 tournaments, Chile has qualified on four occasions to the Summer Olympics, winning a bronze medal in 2000.

== Competitive record ==
=== Pre-Olympic Tournament ===
Pre-Olympic record
Year	Host	Result	GP	W	D	L	GS	GA
1960	Peru	Preliminary stage	2	0	0	2	1	11
1964	Peru	First stage	4	1	1	2	2	6
1968	Colombia	First stage	3	1	1	1	1	1
1971	Colombia	First stage	4	0	2	2	1	4
1976	Brazil	Fifth place	5	1	1	3	5	7
1980	Colombia	Sixth place	6	1	2	3	7	5
1984	Ecuador	Final stage	5	2	1	2	7	6
1987	Bolivia	First stage	4	2	1	1	6	4
1992	Paraguay	First stage	3	0	1	2	2	7
1996	Argentina	First stage	4	1	2	1	6	9
2000	Brazil	Final stage	7	4	1	2	13	11
2004	Chile	Final stage	7	3	2	2	14	10
2020	Colombia	First stage	4	2	1	1	4	2
2024	Venezuela	First stage	4	2	0	2	3	7
Total		14/14	58	18	15	25	64	88

=== Olympic Games ===
Olympics record, senior team played before 1992
Year	Host	Result	GP	W	D	L	GS	GA	Squad
1896	(Greece) Athens	No football tournament							
1900	(France) Paris	Did not participate							
1904	(United States) St. Louis	Did not participate							
1908	(United Kingdom) London	Did not participate							
1912	(Sweden) Stockholm	Did not participate							
1920	(Belgium) Antwerp	Did not participate							
1924	(France) Paris	Did not participate							
1928	(Netherlands) Amsterdam	Consolation final	3	1	1	1	7	7	Squad
1932	(United States) Los Angeles	No football tournament							
1936	(Germany) Berlin	Withdrew							
1948	(United Kingdom) London	Did not participate							
1952	(Finland) Helsinki	Preliminary round	1	0	0	1	4	5	Squad
1956	(Australia) Melbourne	Did not participate							
1960	(Italy) Rome	Did not qualify							
1964	(Japan) Tokyo	Did not qualify							
1968	Mexico City	Did not qualify							
1972	(West Germany) Munich	Did not qualify							
1976	(Canada) Montreal	Did not qualify							
1980	(Soviet Union) Moscow	Did not qualify							
1984	(United States) Los Angeles	Quarter-finals	4	1	2	1	2	2	Squad
1988	(South Korea) Seoul	Did not qualify							
1992	(Spain) Barcelona	Did not qualify							
1996	(United States) Atlanta	Did not qualify							
2000	(Australia) Sydney	Bronze medalists	6	4	0	2	14	6	Squad
2004	(Greece) Athens	Did not qualify							
2008	(China) Beijing	Did not qualify							
2012	(United Kingdom) London	Did not qualify							
2016	(Brazil) Rio de Janeiro	Did not qualify							
2020	(Japan) Tokyo	Did not qualify							
2024	(France) Paris	Did not qualify							
Total		4/26	14	6	3	5	27	20	—

=== Pan American Games ===
Pan American Games record
Year	Host	Result	Pos.	GP	W	D	L	GS	GA	Squad
Until 1995	See Chile national football team									
1999	(Canada) Winnipeg	Did not qualify								
2003	(Dominican Republic) Santo Domingo	Did not qualify								
2007	(Brazil) Rio de Janeiro	Did not qualify								
2011	(Mexico) Guadalajara	Did not qualify								
2015	(Canada) Toronto	Did not qualify								
2019	(Peru) Lima	Did not qualify								
2023	(Chile) Santiago	Silver medalists	2nd	5	4	1	0	9	1	Squad
Total		2 Silver medals	6/19	5	4	1	0	9	1	—

== Results and fixtures ==
Win Draw Loss Fixture

=== 2023 ===
23 October 2023 Pan American Games Group A	Chile	1–0	Mexico	Viña del Mar, Chile
20:00 UTC−3	Guerrero 28'	Report		Stadium: Estadio Sausalito; Referee: Bryan Loayza (Ecuador)

26 October 2023 Pan American Games Group A	Chile	1–0	Uruguay	Valparaíso, Chile
18:00 UTC−3	Aravena 45+1'	Report		Stadium: Estadio Elías Figueroa Brander; Referee: Yender Herrera (Venezuela)

29 October 2023 Pan American Games Group A	Chile	5–0	Dominican Republic	Viña del Mar, Chile
18:00 UTC−3	Fuentes 15'; Alfaro 28'; Assadi 75'; Montes 90+2'; Aravena 90+5'	Report		Stadium: Estadio Sausalito; Referee: Bryan Loayza (Ecuador)

1 November 2023 Pan American Games Semi-finals	Chile	1–0	United States	Valparaíso, Chile
17:00 UTC−3	Pérez 57'	Report		Stadium: Estadio Elías Figueroa Brander; Referee: Juan López (Paraguay)

4 November 2023 Pan American Games Gold medal match	Chile	1–1 (a.e.t.) (2–4 p)	Brazil	Viña del Mar, Chile
20:00 UTC−3	Guerrero 42'	Report	Ronald 83'	Stadium: Estadio Sausalito; Referee: Yender Herrera (Venezuela)
	Penalties
	Zaldivia (penalty scored); Villagra (penalty missed); Fuentes (penalty scored); Montes (penalty missed)		(penalty scored) Nascimento; (penalty scored) Ronald; (penalty missed) Figueiredo; (penalty scored) Miranda; (penalty scored) Mycael

=== 2024 ===
21 January 2024 Pre-Olympic Tournament GS	Peru	1–0	Chile	Valencia, Venezuela
16:00 UTC−4	Flores 67'	Report		Stadium: Estadio Misael Delgado; Referee: Jhon Ospina (Colombia)

27 January 2024 Pre-Olympic Tournament GS	Uruguay	0–1	Chile	Valencia, Venezuela
19:00 UTC−4		Report	Montes 64'	Stadium: Estadio Misael Delgado; Referee: Flávio de Souza (Brazil)

30 January 2024 Pre-Olympic Tournament GS	Chile	0–5	Argentina	Valencia, Venezuela
19:00 UTC−4		Report	Almada 45', 57' (pen.); Castro 61'; Quirós 79'; Gondou 90+1'	Stadium: Estadio Misael Delgado; Referee: Alexis Herrera (Venezuela)

2 February 2024 Pre-Olympic Tournament GS	Chile	2–1	Paraguay	Caracas, Venezuela
19:00 UTC−4	Tapia 31'; Assadi 70'	Report	Leguizamón 33'	Stadium: Estadio Brígido Iriarte; Referee: Augusto Aragón (Ecuador)

== Players ==
=== Current squad ===
The following 25 players were called up for the training microcycle from 27 to 29 July 2026.

Caps and goals updated as of 5 November 2023 after the match against Brazil.

No.	Pos.	Player	Date of birth (age)	Caps	Goals	Club
	GK	Christian Bravo	19 July 2006 (aged 20)	0	0	(Football Federation of Chile) Huachipato
	GK	Gabriel Maureira	6 February 2007 (aged 19)	0	0	(Football Federation of Chile) Colo-Colo
	DF	Rodrigo Alarcón	17 May 2005 (aged 21)	0	0	(Football Federation of Chile) Unión Española
	DF	Sebastián Arancibia	16 June 2006 (aged 20)	0	0	(Football Federation of Chile) Universidad Católica
	DF	Ian Garguez	3 February 2005 (aged 21)	0	0	(Football Federation of Chile) Palestino
	DF	Martín Jiménez	6 February 2008 (aged 18)	0	0	(Football Federation of Chile) Audax Italiano
	DF	Nicolás L'Huillier	15 January 2005 (aged 21)	0	0	(Football Federation of Chile) Universidad Católica
	DF	José Movillo	4 February 2007 (aged 19)	0	0	(Football Federation of Chile) O'Higgins
	DF	Bruno Torres	28 January 2008 (aged 18)	0	0	(Football Federation of Chile) Colo-Colo
	DF	Lucas Velásquez	2 February 2006 (aged 20)	0	0	(Football Federation of Chile) Huachipato
	MF	Agustín Arce	24 January 2005 (aged 21)	0	0	(Football Federation of Chile) Universidad de Chile
	MF	Lucas Avendaño	7 January 2006 (aged 20)	0	0	(Football Federation of Chile) Santiago Wanderers
	MF	Leandro Hernández	13 June 2005 (aged 21)	0	0	(Football Federation of Chile) Colo-Colo
	MF	Flavio Moya	30 December 2005 (aged 20)	0	0	(Football Federation of Chile) Deportes Limache
	MF	Cristóbal Ponce	24 November 2006 (aged 19)	0	0	(Football Federation of Chile) Santiago Wanderers
	MF	Pablo Rodríguez	10 November 2006 (aged 19)	0	0	(Football Federation of Chile) Coquimbo Unido
	MF	Mario Sandoval	7 August 2007 (aged 18)	0	0	(Football Federation of Chile) Audax Italiano
	MF	Joaquín Silva	27 May 2005 (aged 21)	0	0	(Football Federation of Chile) Santiago Wanderers
	MF	Joaquín Soto	3 April 2007 (aged 19)	0	0	(Football Federation of Chile) Unión La Calera
	FW	Vicente Álvarez	14 December 2006 (aged 19)	0	0	(Football Federation of Chile) Deportes Limache
	FW	Diego Corral	9 March 2005 (aged 21)	0	0	(Football Federation of Chile) Universidad Católica
	FW	Yastin Cuevas	29 March 2008 (aged 18)	0	0	(Football Federation of Chile) Colo-Colo
	FW	Emiliano Ramos	8 March 2005 (aged 21)	0	0	(Football Federation of Chile) Everton
	FW	Juan Rossel	17 March 2005 (aged 21)	0	0	(Football Federation of Chile) Universidad Católica
	FW	Ignacio Vásquez	22 May 2006 (aged 20)	0	0	(Football Federation of Chile) Universidad de Chile

=== Overage players in Olympic Games ===
Tournament	Player 1	Player 2	Player 3
2000	Nelson Tapia (GK)	Pedro Reyes (DF)	Iván Zamorano (FW)

== Honours ==
- Summer Olympics:
  - (bronze) Bronze medalists (1): 2000
- Pan American Games:
  - (silver) Silver medalists (2): 1987, 2023
  - (bronze) Bronze medalists (2): 1951, 1963
- South American Games:
  - (gold) Gold medalists (1): 2018
- CONMEBOL Pre-Olympic Tournament:
  - Runners-up (2): 1984, 2000
  - Fourth place (1): 2004

=== Friendlies ===
- Torneo Internacional de Guayaquil::
  - Winners: 1994

== See also ==
- Chile national football team
- Chile national under-20 football team
- Chile national under-17 football team
