= Manuel Monzeglio =

Uruguayan football player (born 2001)

Personal information
- Full name: Manuel Monzeglio Velázquez
- Date of birth: 25 September 2001 (age 25)
- Place of birth: Santa Lucía, Uruguay
- Height: 1.78 m (5 ft 10 in)
- Position: Attacking midfielder

Team information
- Current team: Durazno

Youth career
- Nacional

Senior career*
Years	Team	Apps	(Gls)
2021–2025	Nacional	25	(5)
2024	→ Danubio (loan)	12	(1)
2024	→ Beroe (loan)	3	(0)
2025	Oriental	21	(2)
2026–	Durazno	0	(0)

International career
2023	Uruguay U23	4	(0)
- * Club domestic league appearances and goals as of 10 March 2026

Manuel Monzeglio Velázquez (born 25 September 2001) is a Uruguayan professional footballer who plays as an attacking midfielder for Uruguayan Segunda División club Durazno.

== Club career ==
Monzeglio is a youth academy graduate of Nacional. He made his professional debut for the club on 26 November 2021 in a 2–2 league draw against Liverpool Montevideo. In September 2024, Monzeglio was loaned out to Bulgarian team Beroe Stara Zagora.

== International career ==
On 28 September 2023, Monzeglio was named in Uruguay's squad for the 2023 Pan American Games.

== Career statistics ==
As of 7 February 2025

Appearances and goals by club, season and competition
Club	Season	League			Cup		Continental		Other		Other	
Club	Season	Division	Apps	Goals	Apps	Goals	Apps	Goals	Apps	Goals	Apps	Goals
Nacional	2021	UPD	2	0	—		0	0	0	0	2	0
Nacional	2022	UPD	13	4	2	0	4 (Note: Appearance(s) in Copa Libertadores)	0	0	0	19	4
Nacional	2023	UPD	10	1	0	0	1	0	0	0	11	1
Nacional	Total		25	5	2	0	5	0	0	0	32	5
Danubio (loan)	2023	UPD	—		1	0	—		—		1	0
Danubio (loan)	2024	UPD	12	1	0	0	2 (Note: Appearances in Copa Sudamericana)	0	—		14	1
Danubio (loan)	Total		12	1	1	0	2	0	0	0	15	1
Beroe (loan)	2024–25	First League	3	0	0	0	—		—		3	0
Oriental	2025	USD	0	0	0	0	—		—		0	0
Career total			40	6	3	0	7	0	0	0	50	6

== Honours ==
Nacional

- Uruguayan Primera División: 2022
