= Jonathan Villagra =

Chilean footballer (born 2001)

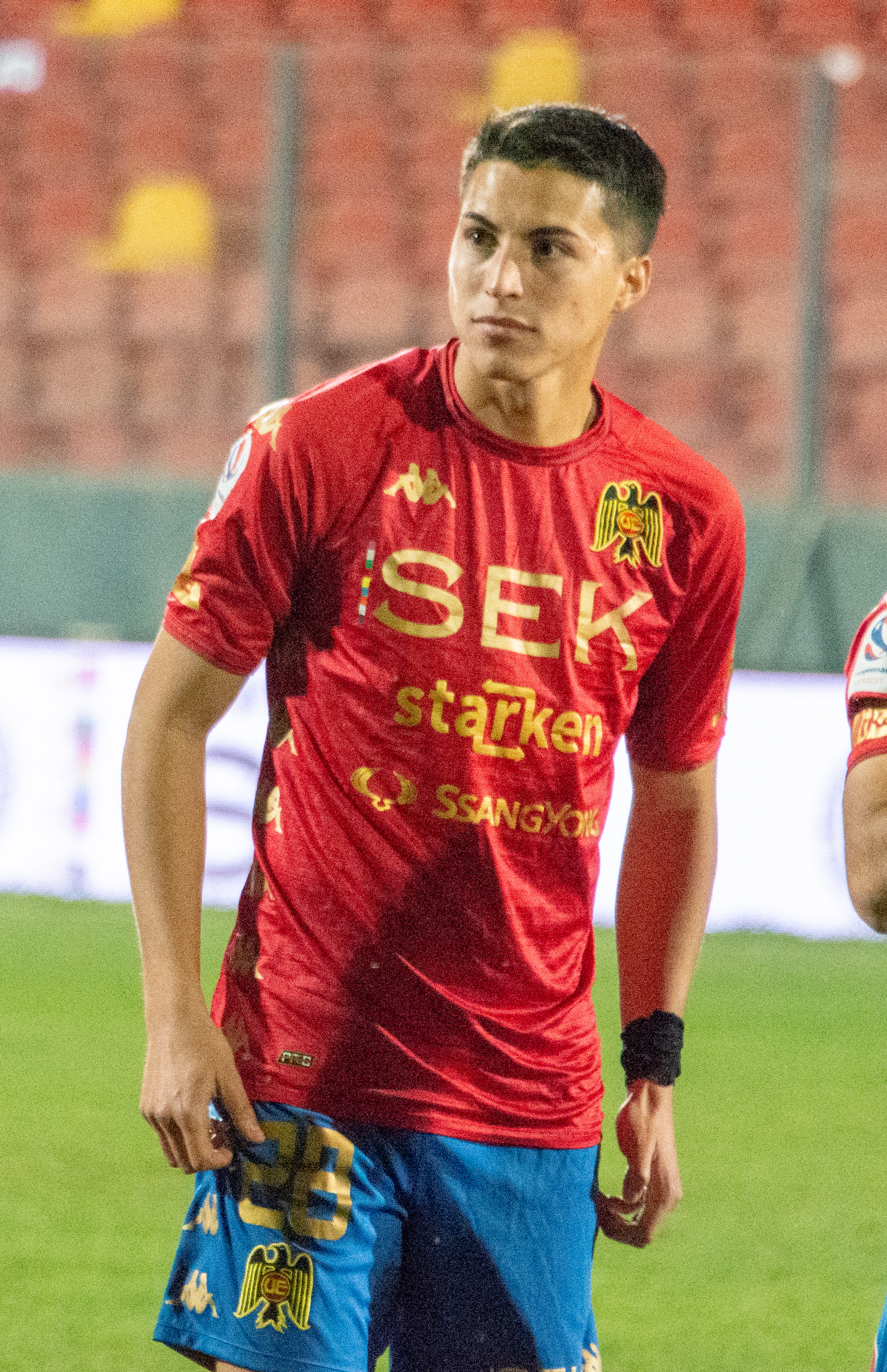
- Villagra with Unión Española in 2023

Personal information
- Full name: Jonathan Gabriel Villagra Bustamante
- Date of birth: 28 March 2001 (age 25)
- Place of birth: Quilicura, Santiago, Chile
- Height: 1.83 m (6 ft 0 in)
- Position: Defender

Team information
- Current team: Colo-Colo
- Number: 2

Youth career
- 2009–2016: Cobreloa
- 2016–2019: Unión Española

Senior career*
Years	Team	Apps	(Gls)
2020–2024	Unión Española	89	(3)
2024	→ Colo-Colo (loan)	0	(0)
2025–	Colo-Colo	40	(0)

International career^{‡}
2022–2024	Chile U23	9	(0)
2026–	Chile	3	(0)
Medal record
Men's football
Representing Chile
Pan American Games
Silver medal – second place	2023 Santiago
- * Club domestic league appearances and goals as of 13 September 2026 ‡ National team caps and goals as of 6 October 2026

Jonathan Gabriel Villagra Bustamante (born 28 March 2001) is a Chilean professional footballer who plays as a defender for Chilean Primera División side Colo-Colo and the Chile national team.

== Club career ==
As a child, Villagra was with Cobreloa until the age of 15 and next joined Unión Española youth system. Initially an attacking midfielder, once he was with Unión Española he became a central defender. He made his professional debut in the 2020 Primera División match against Cobresal on February 15, 2021, along with his teammate Gabriel Norambuena.

In August 2024, Villagra moved to Colo-Colo on loan until the end of the year with an option to buy.

== International career ==
Villagra represented Chile at under-23 level in a 1–0 win against Peru U23 on 31 August 2022, in the context of preparations for the 2023 Pan American Games. He was included in the final squad for the games, where Chile won the silver medal.

In 2024, he took part in the Pre-Olympic Tournament.

At senior level, Villagra received his first call-up for the friendly matches against Canada, United States and Mexico in September and October 2026. He made his debut in the first match against Canada on 26 September.

== Personal life ==
His nickname is Jona, a short form of Jonathan. He has stated that his football models are Arturo Vidal and Sergio Ramos.

== Career statistics ==
=== International ===
As of match played 6 October 2026

Appearances and goals by national team and year
National team	Year	Apps	Goals
Chile	2026	3	0
Total		3	0

== Honours ==
Chile U23

- Pan American Games Silver Medal: 2023
