= José Tomás Movillo =

Chilean footballer

Personal information
- Full name: José Tomás Movillo del Canto
- Date of birth: 8 November 2006 (age 19)
- Place of birth: Linares, Chile
- Height: 1.85 m (6 ft 1 in)
- Position: Defender

Team information
- Current team: O'Higgins
- Number: 27

Youth career
- O'Higgins

Senior career*
Years	Team	Apps	(Gls)
2025–	O'Higgins	5	(0)

International career^{‡}
2026–	Chile U20	7	(0)
- * Club domestic league appearances and goals as of 27 January 2026 ‡ National team caps and goals as of 25 September 2026

José Tomás Movillo del Canto (born 8 November 2006) is a Chilean footballer who plays as a defender for the Chilean side O'Higgins.

== Club career ==
In 2025, Movillo was promoted to the first team under the orders of Argentinian coach Francisco Meneghini. Debuted in professional football on 26 January 2025 in a match against Rangers de Talca in Copa Chile, playing the last 14 minutes in the second half, replacing Cristian Morales. The match ended 3-1 in favor of O'Higgins.

== International career ==
Movillo was called up to the Chile under-20 squad for the friendly matches against Brazil on 6 and 9 June 2026. In September of the same year, he represented them at the South American Games.
