= Thauan Lara =

Brazilian footballer

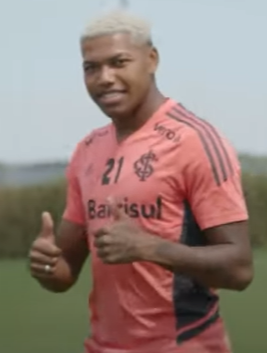

Personal information
- Full name: Thauan Lara dos Santos
- Date of birth: 22 January 2004 (age 22)
- Place of birth: Porto Alegre, Brazil
- Height: 1.76 m (5 ft 9 in)
- Position: Left-back

Team information
- Current team: Portimonense
- Number: 36

Youth career
- 2012–2013: Bonsucesso-RS
- 2013–2022: Internacional

Senior career*
Years	Team	Apps	(Gls)
2021–2024	Internacional	23	(0)
2024	→ Fortaleza (loan)	0	(0)
2024–2025	Alverca	18	(0)
2025–2026	Santa Clara	0	(0)
2025–2026	→ Portimonense (loan)	18	(2)
2026–	Portimonense	3	(0)

International career
2023	Brazil U23	5	(1)
Medal record
Men's football
Representing Brazil
Pan American Games
Winner	2023 Santiago
- * Club domestic league appearances and goals as of 12 September 2026

Thauan Lara dos Santos (born 22 January 2004), known as Thauan Lara, is a Brazilian professional footballer who plays as a left-back for Liga Portugal 2 club Portimonense.

== Club career ==
Born in Porto Alegre, Thauan Lara started his career with Internacional, joining at the age of nine. Growing up, he idolised fellow Brazilian full-back, Marcelo. He made his debut in a 1–0 Série A loss to Cuiabá.

On 4 July 2025, Thauan Lara signed a two-year contract with Santa Clara in the Portuguese Primeira Liga. On 22 August, he was sent on a season-long loan to Liga Portugal 2 club Portimonense.

== Career statistics ==
As of 10 April 2024.

Club	Season	League			State league		Cup		Continental		Other		Total	
Club	Season	Division	Apps	Goals	Apps	Goals	Apps	Goals	Apps	Goals	Apps	Goals	Apps	Goals
Internacional	2021	Série A	1	0	0	0	0	0	0	0	—		1	0
Internacional	2022	Série A	7	0	0	0	0	0	0	0	—		7	0
Internacional	2023	Série A	10	0	4	0	2	0	3 (Note: Appearance(s) in Copa Libertadores)	0	—		19	0
Internacional	2024	Série A	0	0	1	0	0	0	0	0	—		1	0
Internacional	Total		18	0	5	0	2	0	3	0	—		28	0
Fortaleza (loan)	2024	Série A	0	0	—		0	0	0	0	1 (Note: Appearance(s) in Copa do Nordeste)	0	1	0
Career total			18	0	5	0	2	0	3	0	1	0	29	0

== Honours ==
Brasil U23

- Pan American Games: 2023
