= Alí Ávila =

Mexican footballer (born 2003)

Personal information
- Full name: Alí Ávila Vega
- Date of birth: 23 September 2003 (age 23)
- Place of birth: Ahome, Sinaloa, Mexico
- Height: 1.76 m (5 ft 9 in)
- Position: Forward

Team information
- Current team: Querétaro
- Number: 9

Youth career
- 2017–2025: Monterrey

Senior career*
Years	Team	Apps	(Gls)
2022–2025	Monterrey	6	(0)
2021–2023	→ Raya2 (loan)	31	(6)
2024–2025	→ UNAM (loan)	23	(3)
2025	→ Querétaro (loan)	10	(6)
2026–	Querétaro	30	(11)

International career^{‡}
2019	Mexico U16	3	(0)
2019	Mexico U17	5	(2)
2019	Mexico U18	2	(0)
2021–2022	Mexico U20	5	(1)
2023	Mexico U21	2	(0)
2023–	Mexico U23	6	(1)
Medal record
Men's football
Representing Mexico
FIFA U-17 World Cup
Runner-up	2019 Brazil	Team
Central American and Caribbean Games
Gold medal – first place	2023 San Salvador	Team
Pan American Games
Bronze medal – third place	2023 Santiago	Team
- * Club domestic league appearances and goals as of 14 November 2026 ‡ National team caps and goals as of 10 November 2025

Alí Ávila Vega (born 23 September 2003) is a Mexican professional footballer who plays as a forward for Liga MX club Querétaro.

== Club career ==
=== Monterrey / Raya2 ===
Ávila began his career at the academy of Monterrey, where he progressed through all of their youth categories and eventually being loaned out to Raya2 of the Liga de Expansión MX, where he made his professional debut on 8 August 2021, in a 1–2 loss to Atlante and scored his first goal on 17 August 2022 in a 1–2 loss to Venados.

One year later, on 21 May 2023, Ávila made his Liga MX debut in a 0–1 loss to UANL, being subbed in at the 89th minute.

==== UNAM (loan) ====
On 2 February 2024, Ávila was loaned to UNAM, making his debut a week later on a 3–0 win against Puebla, where he was subbed in at the 64th minute and scored a brace.

=== Querétaro ===
On 22 July 2025, Ávila joined Querétaro on loan. He finished the Apertura 2025 with six goals. He secured a permanent transfer in January 2026.

On 26 July, Ávila scored a brace in Querétaro's 2–1 victory over Pachuca.

== International career ==
Ávila was part of the under-17 squad that participated at the 2019 U-17 World Cup, where Mexico finished runner-up and he scored twice.

On 2022, Ávila, was called up by Gerardo Martino as a sparring for the Mexico national football team previous to the 2022 FIFA World Cup.

== Career statistics ==
=== Club ===
As of match played on 14 November 2026

Appearances and goals by club, season and competition
Club	Season	League			Cup		Continental		Other		Total	
Club	Season	Division	Apps	Goals	Apps	Goals	Apps	Goals	Apps	Goals	Apps	Goals
Raya2 (loan)	2021–22	Liga de Expansión MX	1	0	—		—		—		1	0
Raya2 (loan)	2022–23	Liga de Expansión MX	30	6	—		—		—		30	6
Raya2 (loan)	Total		31	6	—		—		—		31	6
Monterrey	2022–23	Liga MX	1	0	—		—		—		1	0
Monterrey	2023–24	Liga MX	5	0	—		—		5 (Note: Appearances in Leagues Cup)	0	10	0
Monterrey	Total		6	0	—		—		5	0	11	0
UNAM (loan)	2023–24	Liga MX	6	2	—		—		—		6	2
UNAM (loan)	2024–25	Liga MX	17	1	—		3 (Note: Appearances in CONCACAF Champions Cup)	0	2	1	22	2
UNAM (loan)	Total		23	3	—		3	0	2	1	28	4
Querétaro (loan)	2025–26	Liga MX	10	6	—		—		1	0	11	6
Querétaro	2025–26	Liga MX	14	5	—		—		—		14	5
Querétaro	2026–27	Liga MX	16	6	—		—		3	1	19	7
Querétaro	Total		30	11	—		—		3	1	33	12
Career total			100	26	0	0	3	0	11	2	114	28

== Honours ==
Mexico Youth

- FIFA U-17 World Cup runner-up: 2019
