= Juan Cruz de los Santos =

Uruguayan football player (born 2003)

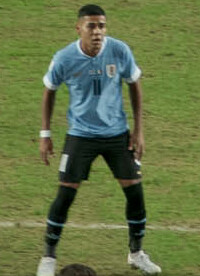
- Cruz with Uruguay U20 in 2023

Personal information
- Full name: Juan Cruz de los Santos da Luz
- Date of birth: 22 February 2003 (age 23)
- Place of birth: Montevideo, Uruguay
- Height: 1.74 m (5 ft 9 in)
- Position: Forward

Team information
- Current team: Al Jazira
- Number: 29

Youth career
- River Plate Montevideo

Senior career*
Years	Team	Apps	(Gls)
2022–2025	River Plate Montevideo	89	(10)
2025–2026	Nacional	25	(5)
2026–	Al Jazira	0	(0)

International career^{‡}
2021–2023	Uruguay U20	36	(4)
2023–2024	Uruguay U23	10	(0)
2024–	Uruguay local	1	(0)
Medal record
Men's football
Representing Uruguay
FIFA U-20 World Cup
Winner	2023 Argentina
South American U-20 Championship
Runner-up	2023 Colombia
- * Club domestic league appearances and goals as of 21:23, 2 November 2026 (UTC) ‡ National team caps and goals as of 5 December 2024

Juan Cruz de los Santos da Luz (born 22 February 2003) is a Uruguayan professional footballer who plays as a forward for UAE Pro League club Al Jazira.

== Club career ==
Cruz is a youth academy graduate of River Plate Montevideo. He made his professional debut for the club on 5 March 2022 in a 1–1 draw against Cerro Largo.

Cruz joined Nacional in July 2025 on a contract until December 2027.

== International career ==
Cruz was a part of the Uruguayan side that won the 2023 FIFA U-20 World Cup in Argentina.

On 28 September 2023, Cruz was named in Uruguay's squad for the 2023 Pan American Games. In January 2024, he was named in Uruguay's squad for the 2024 CONMEBOL Pre-Olympic Tournament.

== Personal life ==
Growing up, Lionel Messi and Neymar were the footballing idols of Cruz.

== Honours ==
Uruguay U20

- FIFA U-20 World Cup: 2023
- South American U-20 Championship runner-up: 2023
