= Alex Ciriaco =

Dominican Republic footballer (b. 2004)

Personal information
- Full name: Alex Manuel Ciriaco Somero
- Date of birth: 21 March 2004 (age 22)
- Place of birth: Ylöjärvi, Finland
- Height: 1.80 m (5 ft 11 in)
- Position: Centre-back

Team information
- Current team: JJK
- Number: 6

Youth career
- –2016: Ylöjärven Ilves
- 2017–: Ilves

Senior career*
Years	Team	Apps	(Gls)
2022–2023	Ilves II	21	(1)
2022–2023	Ilves	0	(0)
2024–	JJK	68	(7)

International career^{‡}
2022–	Dominican Republic U20	7	(0)
2023–	Dominican Republic U23	3	(1)
2023–	Dominican Republic	0	(0)
- * Club domestic league appearances and goals as of 7 November 2026 ‡ National team caps and goals as of 22 January 2024

Alex Manuel Ciriaco Somero (born 21 March 2004) is a footballer who plays as a centre-back for Ykkönen club JJK. Born in Finland, he represents the Dominican Republic internationally.

== Club career ==
=== Ilves ===
Ciriaco played in a youth of sector of Ylöjärven Ilves in Ylöjärvi, before moving to Tampere and joining Ilves youth academy in 2017. He debuted in senior level on 19 February 2022 with Ilves first team, as a substitute in a pre-season Finnish League Cup loss against FC Lahti. Since the beginning of the 2022 season, he has played for the reserve team Ilves II in third-tier level Kakkonen, along with Ilves U19 youth team.

=== JJK Jyväskylä ===
On 23 February 2024, Ciriaco joined Ykkönen club JJK, where he unites with his older brother Eduard.

== International career ==
Ciriaco represented Dominican Republic U20 team in the 2023 FIFA U-20 World Cup, playing in all three group stage matches, but eventually the team was knocked out of the competition. He was also part of the Dominican Republic U23 squad in the 2023 Pan American Games, playing in three games and scoring once against Honduras.

Ciriaco was named in the Dominican Republic senior national team squad for 2023–24 CONCACAF Nations League matches in September and October 2023, but he remained an unused substitute.

== Personal life ==
Ciriaco was born in Finland to Finnish mother and to father from the Dominican Republic. He holds a dual Finnish–Dominican Republic citizenship. His older brother Eduard Ciriaco is also a footballer, playing as a defender for JJK Jyväskylä in Finland.
