= Julián Alfaro =

Chilean footballer (born 2001)

Personal information
- Full name: Julián Israel Alfaro Gaete
- Date of birth: 2 September 2001 (age 25)
- Place of birth: Quinta Normal, Santiago, Chile
- Height: 1.76 m (5 ft 9 in)
- Position: Forward

Team information
- Current team: Everton (on loan from Universidad de Chile)

Youth career
- Escuela Quinta Normal
- 2011–2018: Universidad de Chile

Senior career*
Years	Team	Apps	(Gls)
2018–2021	Universidad de Chile	0	(0)
2019–2021	→ Magallanes (loan)	48	(6)
2022–2024	Magallanes	71	(9)
2025–	Universidad de Chile	1	(0)
2025–	→ Everton (loan)	0	(0)

International career^{‡}
2023–2024	Chile U23	3	(1)
Medal record
Men's football
Representing Chile
Pan American Games
Silver medal – second place	2023 Santiago	Team
- * Club domestic league appearances and goals as of 23 July 2025 ‡ National team caps and goals as of 13 February 2024

Julián Israel Alfaro Gaete (born 2 September 2001) is a Chilean footballer who plays as a forward for Chilean Primera División side Everton de Viña del Mar on loan from Universidad de Chile.

== Club career ==
Born in Quinta Normal, Santiago de Chile, Alfaro was with the football academy of his hometown, Escuela de Fútbol Municipal de Quinta Normal, since he was four years old before joining the Universidad de Chile youth system. The top goalscorer of the under-19 team, he was on the bench in the Chilean Primera División match against Unión La Calera on 29 September 2018. Since 2019, he was loaned to Magallanes until the end of the 2021 season, being finally transferred in the 2022 season.

He has taken part of a successful stint of Magallanes, winning three consecutive titles: the 2022 Primera B, getting the promotion to the Chilean top division, the 2022 Copa Chile, qualifying for the 2023 Copa Libertadores, and the 2023 Supercopa de Chile versus Colo-Colo. In 2023, he became the team captain in place of Iván Vásquez.

Alfaro returned to Universidad de Chile for the 2025 season. He was loaned out to Everton de Viña del Mar for the second half of the year.

== International career ==
Alfaro has taken part of training microcycles of the Chile senior team with the coaches Reinaldo Rueda and Martín Lasarte. He also has been with the national team at both the under-20 and the under-23 level.

He received his first call up for the 2026 FIFA World Cup qualifiers against Uruguay and Colombia in September 2023.

He was included in the final squad for the 2023 Pan American Games, where Chile won the silver medal.

In 2024, he took part in the Pre-Olympic Tournament.

== Honours ==
Magallanes

- Primera B de Chile: 2022
- Copa Chile: 2022
- Supercopa de Chile: 2023

Chile U23

- Pan American Games Silver Medal: 2023
