= Ronald Falkoski =

Brazilian footballer (born 2003)

Ronald
Personal information
- Full name: Ronald Cardoso Falkoski
- Date of birth: 11 February 2003 (age 23)
- Place of birth: Santo Antônio da Patrulha, Brazil
- Height: 1.86 m (6 ft 1 in)
- Position: Defensive midfielder

Team information
- Current team: Fortaleza (on loan from Grêmio)
- Number: 8

Youth career
- 2010–2023: Grêmio

Senior career*
Years	Team	Apps	(Gls)
2023–	Grêmio	28	(1)
2025–	→ Atlético Goianiense (loan)	14	(0)
2026–	→ Fortaleza (loan)	11	(0)

International career
2023	Brazil U20	14	(3)
2023	Brazil U23	5	(2)
Medal record
Men's football
Representing Brazil
South American U-20 Championship
Winner	2023 Colombia
Pan American Games
Winner	2023 Santiago
- * Club domestic league appearances and goals as of 15 April 2026

Ronald Cardoso Falkoski (born 11 February 2003), known as Ronald, is a Brazilian professional footballer who plays as a defensive midfielder for Campeonato Brasileiro Série B club Fortaleza, on loan from Grêmio.

== Club career ==
Born in Santo Antônio da Patrulha, Rio Grande do Sul, Ronald joined Grêmio's youth setup in 2010, aged seven. On 8 June 2021, he renewed his contract with the club until December 2025.

On 29 April 2023, Ronald was promoted to Grêmio's first team. He made his senior – and Série A – debut on 22 July, starting and scoring the winner in a 1–0 home success over Atlético Mineiro.

== International career ==
Born in Brazil, Ronald is of Polish descent and had been scouted by the Polish Football Association about the possibility of playing for them. In December 2022, Ronald was called up to the Brazil under-20 team by manager Ramon Menezes for the 2023 South American U-20 Championship, where he was mainly a backup option as the team were crowned champions. On 1 May 2023, he was also called up to the year's FIFA U-20 World Cup, being used more sparingly.

== Career statistics ==
As of match played 15 November 2025

Appearances and goals by club, season and competition
Club	Season	League			State league (Note: Includes Campeonato Gaúcho)		Copa do Brasil		Continental		Other		Total	
Club	Season	Division	Apps	Goals	Apps	Goals	Apps	Goals	Apps	Goals	Apps	Goals	Apps	Goals
Grêmio	2023	Série A	10	1	0	0	0	0	—		—		10	1
Grêmio	2024	Série A	11	0	1	0	0	0	1 (Note: Appearance in Copa Libertadores)	0	—		13	0
Grêmio	2025	Série A	6	0	0	0	2	0	4 (Note: Appearances in Copa Sudamericana)	0	—		12	0
Grêmio	Total		27	1	1	0	2	0	5	0	0	0	35	1
Atlético Goianiense (loan)	2025	Série B	14	0	—		—		—		—		14	0
Career total			41	1	1	0	2	0	5	0	0	0	49	1

== Honours ==
Grêmio

- Campeonato Gaúcho: 2023, 2024

Fortaleza

- Campeonato Cearense: 2026

Brazil U20

- South American U-20 Championship: 2023

Brazil U23

- Pan American Games: 2023
