= Miranda (footballer, born 2000) =

Brazilian footballer

Personal information
- Full name: Matheus dos Santos Miranda
- Date of birth: 19 January 2000 (age 26)
- Place of birth: Duque de Caxias, Rio de Janeiro, Brazil
- Height: 1.82 m (6 ft 0 in)
- Position: Defender

Team information
- Current team: Operário Ferroviário
- Number: 16

Youth career
- –2020: Vasco da Gama

Senior career*
| Years | Team | Apps | (Gls) |
| 2018–2024 | Vasco da Gama | 61 | (0) |
| 2024 | → Amazonas (loan) | 27 | (2) |
| 2025 | CRB | 8 | (3) |
| 2025– | Operário Ferroviário | 57 | (1) |

International career^{‡}
| 2015–2016 | Brazil U17 | 2 | (0) |
| 2023– | Brazil U23 | 5 | (1) |
Medal record
Men's football
Representing Brazil
Pan American Games
| Winner | 2023 Santiago |
- * Club domestic league appearances and goals as of 18 November 2026 ‡ National team caps and goals as of 4 November 2023 (UTC)

Matheus dos Santos Miranda (born 19 January 2000), commonly known as Miranda, is a Brazilian footballer who plays as a defender for Operário Ferroviário.

== Career statistics ==
=== Club ===
As of 26 November 2021.

| Club | Season | League | | | State league | | Cup | | Continental | | Other | | Total | |
| Club | Season | Division | Apps | Goals | Apps | Goals | Apps | Goals | Apps | Goals | Apps | Goals | Apps | Goals |
|---|---|---|---|---|---|---|---|---|---|---|---|---|---|---|
| Vasco da Gama | 2018 | Série A | 1 | 0 | 0 | 0 | 0 | 0 | 0 | 0 | 0 | 0 | 1 | 0 |
| Vasco da Gama | 2019 | Série A | 1 | 0 | 0 | 0 | 0 | 0 | 0 | 0 | 0 | 0 | 1 | 0 |
| Vasco da Gama | 2020 | Série A | 18 | 0 | 3 | 0 | 6 | 0 | 0 | 0 | 0 | 0 | 27 | 0 |
| Vasco da Gama | 2021 | Série B | 10 | 0 | 11 | 0 | 2 | 0 | 0 | 0 | 0 | 0 | 23 | 0 |
| Career total | | | 30 | 0 | 14 | 0 | 8 | 0 | 0 | 0 | 0 | 0 | 52 | 0 |
