= Football at the 2023 Pan American Games – Men's tournament =

Football – Men's tournament at the 2023 Pan American Games
- Venues: Estadio Sausalito (Viña del Mar); Estadio Elías Figueroa Brander (Valparaíso)
- Dates: 23 October – 4 November

Medalists
Gold medal	Brazil
Silver medal	Chile
Bronze medal	Mexico

The Men's football tournament at the 2023 Pan American Games was held in Valparaíso and Viña del Mar from 23 October to 4 November 2023.

== Qualification ==
A total of eight men's teams qualified to compete at the games, four CONMEBOL teams and four CONCACAF teams. For CONMEBOL, the best three teams at the 2023 South American U-20 Championship qualified, while Chile automatically qualified as hosts. For CONCACAF, the champion team and the best team from each of the three zones (North American, Central American and Caribbean) at the 2022 CONCACAF U-20 Championship qualified.

=== Qualified teams ===
Event		Dates	Location	Quota(s)	Qualified
Host nation		—N/a	—N/a	1	Chile
2022 CONCACAF U-20 Championship	Champions	June 18 − July 3	Honduras	1	United States
2022 CONCACAF U-20 Championship	Top Caribbean team	June 18 − July 3	Honduras	1	Dominican Republic
2022 CONCACAF U-20 Championship	Top Central American team	June 18 − July 3	Honduras	1	Honduras
2022 CONCACAF U-20 Championship	Top North American team	June 18 − July 3	Honduras	1	Mexico
2023 South American U-20 Championship		19 January – 12 February	Colombia	3	Brazil; Uruguay; Colombia
Total				8	

== Venues ==
Viña del Mar	Valparaíso
Estadio Sausalito	Estadio Elías Figueroa Brander
Capacity: 23,423	Capacity: 20,575
Football at the 2023 Pan American Games – Men's tournament is located in Chile

== Draw ==
The draw for the group stage was first scheduled to 31 March 2023 and postponed to 18 August 2023, into the studios of TV station Chilevisión. Chile, the host nation, was allocated as the seed in group A. Subsequently, the teams belonging to CONCACAF were drawn, with two in each of the groups. Finally the remaining teams, members of CONMEBOL, were allocated.

== Squads ==
Players had to be born on or after 1 January 2000; three overage players were allowed.

== Match officials ==
Country	Referees	Assistants	Matches assigned
Chile	Fernando Véjar Díaz	Gabriel Ureta Alfaro; Carlos Enrique Poblete	Colombia v Honduras, Group B Colombia v United States, Group B Mexico v United States, Bronze medal match
Chile	Manuel Vergara	Cláudio Rios; Alan Sandoval	United States v Honduras, Group B Uruguay v Colombia, Fifth place match
Ecuador	Bryan Loayza	David Vacacela; Danny Ávila	Chile v Mexico, Group A Chile v Dominican Republic, Group A Brazil v Mexico, Semi-finals
Ecuador	Juan Andrade	Luzmilla González; Edison Vasquez	Dominican Republic v Honduras, Seventh place match
Paraguay	Juan López	Júlio Aranda; Luis Onieva	Uruguay v Dominican Republic, Group A Uruguay v Mexico, Group A Chile v United States, Semi-finals
Peru	Jesús Cartagena	José Alberto Castillo; Leonar Soto Rengifo	Mexico v Dominican Republic, Group A
Uruguay	José Burgos	Agustín Berisso; Edison Vasquez (Ecuador)	Brazil v Colombia, Group B
Venezuela	José Matos Uzcategui	Erizon Nieto Díaz; Antoni García Brito	Brazil v United States, Group B Brazil v Honduras, Group B
Venezuela	Yender Herrera Toledo	Erizon Nieto Díaz; Antoni García Brito	Chile v Uruguay, Group A Chile v Brazil, Gold medal match

== Group stage ==
All times are local (UTC−3).

=== Group A ===
Pos	Team	Pld	W	D	L	GF	GA	GD	Pts	Qualification
1	Chile (H)	3	3	0	0	7	0	+7	9	Semi-finals
2	Mexico	3	1	1	1	1	1	0	4	Semi-finals
3	Uruguay	3	1	0	2	1	2	−1	3	Fifth place match
4	Dominican Republic	3	0	1	2	0	6	−6	1	Seventh place match

Source: Santiago2023
(H) Host
23 October 2023
15:00

Uruguay	1–0	Dominican Republic
Rodríguez 35'	Report

Estadio Sausalito, Viña del Mar
Referee: Juan López (Paraguay)
23 October 2023
20:00

Chile	1–0	Mexico
Guerrero 28'	Report

Estadio Sausalito, Viña del Mar
Referee: Bryan Loayza (Ecuador)

26 October 2023
13:00

Mexico	0–0	Dominican Republic
	Report

Estadio Elías Figueroa Brander, Valparaíso
Referee: Jesús Cartagena (Peru)
26 October 2023
18:00

Chile	1–0	Uruguay
Aravena 45+1'	Report

Estadio Elías Figueroa Brander, Valparaíso
Referee: Yender Herrera Toledo (Venezuela)

29 October 2023
13:00

Uruguay	0–1	Mexico
	Report	Saldivia 28' (o.g.)

Estadio Elías Figueroa Brander, Valparaíso
Referee: Juan López (Paraguay)
29 October 2023
18:00

Chile	5–0	Dominican Republic
Fuentes 15'; Alfaro 28'; Assadi 75'; Montes 90+2'; Aravena 90+5'	Report

Estadio Sausalito, Viña del Mar
Referee: Bryan Loayza (Ecuador)

=== Group B ===
Pos	Team	Pld	W	D	L	GF	GA	GD	Pts	Qualification
1	Brazil	3	3	0	0	6	0	+6	9	Semi-finals
2	United States	3	2	0	1	4	2	+2	6	Semi-finals
3	Colombia	3	1	0	2	2	4	−2	3	Fifth place match
4	Honduras	3	0	0	3	1	7	−6	0	Seventh place match

Source: Santiago2023
23 October 2023
13:00

Colombia	2–0	Honduras
Ruiz 16'; Cortés 41'	Report

Estadio Elías Figueroa Brander, Valparaíso
Referee: Fernando Véjar Diaz (Chile)
23 October 2023
18:00

Brazil	1–0	United States
Miranda 86'	Report

Estadio Elías Figueroa Brander, Valparaíso
Referee: José Matos Uzcategui (Venezuela)

26 October 2023
15:00

United States	2–1	Honduras
Leyva 72'; Ku-DiPietro 90'	Report	García 19'

Estadio Sausalito, Viña del Mar
Referee: Manuel Vergara (Chile)
26 October 2023
20:00

Brazil	2–0	Colombia
Biro 16'; Pirani 51'	Report

Estadio Sausalito, Viña del Mar
Referee: José Burgos (Uruguay)

29 October 2023
13:00

Brazil	3–0	Honduras
Ronald 50'; Martins 54'; Lara 79'	Report

Estadio Sausalito, Viña del Mar
Referee: José Matos Uzcategui (Venezuela)
29 October 2023
18:00

Colombia	0–2	United States
	Report	Ikoba 63'; Neri 76'

Estadio Elías Figueroa Brander, Valparaíso
Referee: Fernando Véjar Diaz (Chile)

== Placement stage (5th–8th place) ==
7th place
1 November — Viña del Mar
Dominican Republic	1
Honduras	3

5th place
1 November — Valparaíso
Uruguay (p)	0 (4)
Colombia	0 (3)

=== Seventh place match ===
1 November 2023
14:00

Dominican Republic	1–3	Honduras
Ciriaco 40'	Report	Miranda 11'; Carter 45'; Ochoa 88'

Estadio Sausalito, Viña del Mar
Referee: Juan Andrade (Ecuador)

=== Fifth place match ===
1 November 2023
12:00

Uruguay	0–0	Colombia
	Report
Penalties
O'Neil (penalty scored); Nandín (penalty scored); Cruz de los Santos (penalty scored); Lavega (penalty scored); Piñeiro (penalty missed)	4–3	(penalty scored) Palacios; (penalty scored) Castilla; (penalty scored) Rojas; (penalty missed) Mosquera; (penalty missed) Ruiz

Estadio Elías Figueroa Brander, Valparaíso
Referee: Manuel Vergara (Chile)

== Knockout stage ==
=== Medal round ===
Semifinals
1 November — Valparaíso
Chile	1
United States	0
1 November — Viña del Mar
Mexico	0
Brazil	1

Final
4 November — Viña del Mar
Chile	1 (2)
Brazil (p)	1 (4)
Third place
4 November — Viña del Mar
United States	1
Mexico	4

=== Semi-finals ===
1 November 2023
17:00

Chile	1–0	United States
Pérez 57'	Report

Estadio Elías Figueroa Brander, Valparaíso
Referee: Juan López (Paraguay)
1 November 2023
20:00

Mexico	0–1	Brazil
	Report	Leone 2' (o.g.)

Estadio Sausalito, Viña del Mar
Referee: Bryan Loayza (Ecuador)

=== Bronze medal match ===
4 November 2023
15:00

United States	1–4	Mexico
Ikoba 23'	Report	Carrillo 42', 72'; Fulgencio 50'; Ávila 88'

Estadio Sausalito, Viña del Mar
Referee: Fernando Véjar Diaz (Chile)

=== Gold medal match ===
4 November 2023
20:00

Chile	1–1 (a.e.t.)	Brazil
Guerrero 42'	Report	Ronald 83'
Penalties
Zaldivia (penalty scored); Villagra (penalty missed); Fuentes (penalty scored); Montes (penalty missed)	2–4	(penalty scored) Nascimento; (penalty scored) Ronald; (penalty missed) Figueiredo; (penalty scored) Miranda; (penalty scored) Mycael

Estadio Sausalito, Viña del Mar
Referee: Yender Herrera Toledo (Venezuela)

2023 Pan American Games Men's football tournament
winners

Brazil
5th title

== Final standings ==
Rank	Team
1st place, gold medalist(s)	Brazil
2nd place, silver medalist(s)	Chile
3rd place, bronze medalist(s)	Mexico
4	United States
5	Uruguay
6	Colombia
7	Honduras
8	Dominican Republic

== Goalscorers ==
There were 35 goals scored in 18 matches, for an average of 1.94 goals per match.

2 goals

- (Brazil) Ronald
- (Chile) Alexander Aravena
- (Chile) Maximiliano Guerrero
- (Mexico) Jordan Carrillo
- (United States) Tega Ikoba

1 goal

- (Brazil) Guilherme Biro
- (Brazil) Thauan Lara
- (Brazil) Gustavo Martins
- (Brazil) Miranda
- (Brazil) Gabriel Pirani
- (Chile) Julián Alfaro
- (Chile) Lucas Assadi
- (Chile) César Fuentes
- (Chile) Clemente Montes
- (Chile) César Pérez
- (Colombia) Carlos Manuel Cortés
- (Colombia) Daniel Ruiz
- (Dominican Republic) Alex Ciriaco
- (Honduras) Daniel Carter
- (Honduras) Antony García
- (Honduras) Jeffry Miranda
- (Honduras) David Ochoa
- (Mexico) Alí Ávila
- (Mexico) Raymundo Fulgencio
- (United States) Theodore Ku-DiPietro
- (United States) Danny Leyva
- (United States) Rodrigo Neri
- (Uruguay) Emiliano Rodríguez

1 own goal

- (Mexico) Tony Leone (against Brazil)
- (Uruguay) Alan Saldivia (against Mexico)

Source: Santiago2023

== Discipline ==
The following suspensions were served during the tournament:

Player	Offence(s)	Suspension
(Honduras) Daniel Carter	(red card) United States v Honduras, Group B	Brazil v Honduras, Group B
(Mexico) Antonio Leone	(red card) Mexico v Dominican Republic, Group A	Uruguay v Mexico, Group A
(Dominican Republic) Omry Bello	(red card) Mexico v Dominican Republic, Group A	Chile v Dominican Republic, Group A
(Uruguay) Ramiro Méndez (Uruguay) Diego Hernández	(red card) Uruguay v Mexico, Group A	Uruguay v Colombia, Fifth place match
