= Chile at the 2023 Pan American Games =

- IOC code: CHI
- NOC: Chilean Olympic Committee

in Santiago, Chile 20 October 2023 – 5 November 2023
- Competitors: 664 in 42 sports
- Flag bearers (opening): Esteban Grimalt & Kristel Köbrich
- Flag bearers (closing): Martín Vidaurre & María Paulina Vega
- Medals Ranked 8th: Gold 12 Silver 31 Bronze 36 Total 79

Pan American Games appearances (overview)
- 1951; 1955; 1959; 1963; 1967; 1971; 1975; 1979; 1983; 1987; 1991; 1995; 1999; 2003; 2007; 2011; 2015; 2019; 2023

Chile competed at the 2023 Pan American Games in Santiago, Chile from October 20 to November 5, 2023. Chile was the host nation of the games, marking the first time the country hosts the games. This was Chile's 19th appearance at the Pan American Games, having competed at every edition of the games since the inaugural edition in 1951.

Beach volleyball athlete Esteban Grimalt and swimmer Kristel Köbrich were the country's flagbearers during the opening ceremony. Meanwhile, cyclist Martín Vidaurre and table tennis athlete María Paulina Vega were the country's flagbearers during the closing ceremony.

== Medalists ==
The following Chilean competitors won medals at the games. In the by discipline sections below, medalists' names are bolded.

Medal	Name	Sport	Event	Date
Gold	Francisca Crovetto	Shooting	Women's skeet	October 22
Gold	Emile Ritter	Water skiing	Men's jump	October 23
Gold	Antonia Liewald; Isidora Niemeyer	Rowing	Women's lightweight double sculls	October 24
Gold	Antonia Abraham; Melita Abraham; Victoria Hostetter; Magdalena Nannig	Rowing	Women's coxless four	October 24
Gold	Alfredo Abraham; Ignacio Abraham; Marcelo Poo; Nahuel Reyes	Rowing	Men's coxless four	October 24
Gold	Lucas Nervi	Athletics	Men's discus throw	October 30
Gold	Santiago Ford	Athletics	Men's decathlon	October 31
Gold	Martina Weil	Athletics	Women's 400 metres	November 1
Gold	Enrique Villalón	Karate	Men's 60 kg	November 3
Gold	Valentina Toro	Karate	Women's 55 kg	November 4
Gold	Rodrigo Rojas	Karate	Men's +84 kg	November 4
Gold	Emanuelle Silva	Roller sports	Men's 200 metres time-trial	November 4
Silver	Martín Vidaurre	Cycling	Men's cross-country	October 21
Silver	Catalina Vidaurre	Cycling	Women's cross-country	October 21
Silver	Hugo Catrileo	Athletics	Men's marathon	October 22
Silver	Francisco Lapostol; Brahim Alvayay; Oscar Vásquez; Andoni Habash	Rowing	Men's quadruple sculls	October 23
Silver	Christina Hostetter; Victoria Hostetter; Melita Abraham; Antonia Abraham	Rowing	Women's quadruple sculls	October 23
Silver	Agustina Varas	Water skiing	Women's jump	October 23
Silver	Chile men's national 3x3 team: Daniel Arcos; Carlos Lauler; Kevin Rubio; Diego Silva	Basketball	Men's 3x3 tournament	October 23
Silver	César Abaroa; Eber Sanhueza	Rowing	Men's lightweight double sculls	October 24
Silver	Joaquín Churchill; Ignacio Morales; Aaron Contreras	Taekwondo	Men's Kyorugi team	October 24
Silver	Kristel Köbrich	Swimming	Women's 1500 metre freestyle	October 25
Silver	Melita Abraham; Antonia Abraham	Rowing	Women's double sculls	October 25
Silver	Antonia Abraham; Melita Abraham; Alfredo Abraham; Ignacio Abraham; Óscar Vásquez; Francisco Lapostol; Magdalena Nannig; Victoria Hostetter; Isidora Soto	Rowing	Mixed eight	October 25
Silver	Tomás Barrios; Alejandro Tabilo	Tennis	Men's doubles	October 28
Silver	Tomás Barrios	Tennis	Men's singles	October 29
Silver	Jorge Pérez	Judo	Men's 81 kg	October 29
Silver	Pablo Núñez	Fencing	Men's épée	October 30
Silver	Thomas Briceño	Judo	Men's 100 kg	October 30
Silver	Francisco Solis	Judo	Men's +100 kg	October 30
Silver	Rafael Cortéz	Surfing	Men's longboard	October 30
Silver	Anaís Hernández; Martina Weil; Isidora Jiménez; María Ignacia Montt	Athletics	Women's 4 × 100 metres relay	November 2
Silver	María José Mailliard	Canoeing	Women's C-1 200 metres	November 3
Silver	Chile men's national field hockey team: Adrian Henriquez; Vicente Goni; Fernando Renz; José Maldonado; Martín Rodriguez; Kay Gesswein; Andrés Pizarro; Juan Amoroso; Jose Hurtado; Felipe Renz; Raimundo Valenzuela; Axel Richter; Axel Troncoso; Sebastián Wolansky; Nils Strabucchi; Franco Becerra	Field hockey	Men's tournament	November 3
Silver	Chile women's national football team: Yenny Acuña; Yanara Aedo; Anaís Álvarez; Karen Araya; Antonia Canales; Franchesca Caniguán; Christiane Endler; Karen Fuentes; Su Helen Galaz; Yastin Jiménez; Yessenia López; Michelle Olivares; Isidora Olave; Fernanda Pinilla; Fernanda Ramírez; Camila Sáez; María José Urrutia; Daniela Zamora	Football	Women's tournament	November 3
Silver	María José Mailliard; Paula Morales	Canoeing	Women's C-2 500 metres	November 4
Silver	Chile national under-23 football team: Brayan Cortés; Tomás Ahumada; Jonathan Villagra; Bruno Gutiérrez; Daniel Gutiérrez; Matías Zaldivia; Antonio Díaz; Felipe Loyola; Vicente Pizarro; César Fuentes; Lucas Assadi; César Pérez; Alfred Canales; Maximiliano Guerrero; Alexander Aravena; Clemente Montes; Julián Alfaro; Damián Pizarro	Football	Men's tournament	November 4
Silver	Chile national rugby sevens team: Clemente Armstrong; Luca Strabucchi; Gonzalo Lara Mehech; Santiago Videla; Manuel Bustamante; Cristóbal Game; Lucca Avelli; Ernesto Ariel Tchimino; Francisco Urroz; Diego Warnken; Nicolás Garafulic; Tomás Salas	Rugby sevens	Men's tournament	November 4
Silver	Clemente Seguel	Sailing	Laser	November 4
Silver	Pedro Robles; Paula Hermán; Carmina Malsch	Sailing	Lightning	November 4
Silver	José Manuel Cedano	Cycling	Men's BMX freestyle	November 5
Silver	Macarena Perez Grasset	Cycling	Women's BMX freestyle	November 5
Silver	Tomás Freire	Karate	Men's 67 kg	November 5
Bronze	Aranza Villalón	Cycling	Women's road time trial	October 22
Bronze	Claudia Gallardo	Taekwondo	Women's 67 kg	October 22
Bronze	Oscar Vásquez; Marcelo Poo; Brahim Alvayay; Francisco Lapostol; Alfredo Abraham; Ignacio Abraham; Nahuel Reyes; Andoni Habash; Isidora Soto	Rowing	Men's eight	October 23
Bronze	Matías González	Water skiing	Men's tricks	October 23
Bronze	Ignacia Holscher	Water skiing	Women's wakeboard	October 23
Bronze	Chile women's national 3x3 team: Jovanka Ljubetic; Ziomara Morrison; Javiera Novión; Fernanda Ovalle	Basketball	Women's 3x3 tournament	October 23
Bronze	Christina Hostetter; Antonia Liewald; Antonia Pichott; Victoria Hostetter; Antonia Abraham; Melita Abraham; Magdalena Nannig; Isidora Niemeyer; Isis Correa	Rowing	Women's eight	October 24
Bronze	Martín Labra	Water skiing	Men's overall	October 24
Bronze	Jacob Decar	Cycling	Men's omnium	October 24
Bronze	Denisse Bravo	Boxing	Women's 54 kg	October 26
Bronze	Catalina Soto	Cycling	Women's omnium	October 26
Bronze	Esteban Grimalt; Marco Grimalt	Beach volleyball	Men's tournament	October 27
Bronze	María Paulina Vega; Nicolás Burgos	Table tennis	Mixed doubles	October 30
Bronze	Gustavo Gómez; Nicolás Burgos	Table tennis	Men's doubles	October 31
Bronze	María Paulina Vega; Daniela Gómez	Table tennis	Women's doubles	October 31
Bronze	Martín Kouyoumdjian	Athletics	Men's 400 metres	November 1
Bronze	Analía Fernández	Fencing	Women's épée	November 1
Bronze	Giselle Delgado; Ana María Pinto	Squash	Women's doubles	November 2
Bronze	Antonia Valdés	Wrestling	Women's freestyle 53 kg	November 3
Bronze	Renato Bolelli	Basque pelota	Men's individual fronton rubber ball	November 4
Bronze	Rosario Valderrama	Basque pelota	Women's individual fronton rubber ball	November 4
Bronze	Matías Martínez	Breaking	B-Boys	November 4
Bronze	Chile women's national field hockey team: Doménica Ananías; Simone Avelli; Camila Caram; Sofía Filipek; Fernanda Flores; Francisca Irazoqui; María Maldonado; Antonia Morales; Laura Müller; Denise Rojas; Natalia Salvador; Agustina Solano; Francisca Tala; Manuela Urroz; Paula Valdivia; Fernanda Villagrán	Field hockey	Women's tournament	November 4
Bronze	Chile men's national handball team: Sebastián Ceballos; Emil Feuchtmann; Erwin Feuchtmann; Esteban Salinas; Felipe García; Benjamin Illesca; Vicente González; Rodrigo Salinas; Matias Paya; Daniel Ayala; Danilo Salgado; Cristián Moll Ramírez; Aaron Codina; Francisco Ahumada	Handball	Men's tournament	November 4
Bronze	Hugo Ramírez	Roller sports	Men's 1,000 metres sprint	November 4
Bronze	Diego González	Sailing	Men's sunfish	November 4
Bronze	María José Poncell	Sailing	Women's sunfish	November 4
Bronze	José Moreno	Wrestling	Men's Greco-Roman 87 kg	November 4
Bronze	Yasmani Acosta	Wrestling	Men's Greco-Roman 130 kg	November 4
Bronze	Ricardo Soto	Archery	Men's individual recurve	November 5
Bronze	Esteban Romero; Julián Stabon	Basque pelota	Men's doubles trinquete rubber ball	November 5
Bronze	Magdalena Muñoz; Natalia Bozzo	Basque pelota	Women's doubles frontenis	November 5
Bronze	Camilo Velozo	Karate	Men's 67 kg	November 5
Bronze	Emanuelle Silva	Roller sports	Men's 500 metres + distance	November 5
Bronze	Hugo Ramírez	Roller sports	Men's 10,000 metres elimination	November 5
Bronze	Daniela Ortega; María Paulina Vega; Zhiying Zeng	Table tennis	Women's team	November 5

Medals by sport
Sport	1st place, gold medalist(s)	2nd place, silver medalist(s)	3rd place, bronze medalist(s)	Total
Rowing	3	5	2	**10**
Athletics	3	2	1	**6**
Karate	3	1	1	**5**
Water skiing	1	1	3	**5**
Roller sports	1	0	3	**4**
Shooting	1	0	0	**1**
Cycling	0	4	3	**7**
Judo	0	3	0	**3**
Sailing	0	2	2	**4**
Canoeing	0	2	0	**2**
Football	0	2	0	**2**
Tennis	0	2	0	**2**
Basketball	0	1	1	**2**
Fencing	0	1	1	**2**
Field hockey	0	1	1	**2**
Taekwondo	0	1	1	**2**
Rugby sevens	0	1	0	**1**
Surfing	0	1	0	**1**
Swimming	0	1	0	**1**
Basque pelota	0	0	4	**4**
Table tennis	0	0	4	**4**
Wrestling	0	0	3	**3**
Archery	0	0	1	**1**
Beach volleyball	0	0	1	**1**
Boxing	0	0	1	**1**
Breaking	0	0	1	**1**
Handball	0	0	1	**1**
Squash	0	0	1	**1**
Total	12	31	36	79

Medals by day
**Day**	**Date**	1st place, gold medalist(s)	2nd place, silver medalist(s)	3rd place, bronze medalist(s)	Total
1	October 21	0	2	0	2
2	October 22	1	1	2	4
3	October 23	1	4	4	9
4	October 24	3	2	3	8
5	October 25	0	3	0	3
6	October 26	0	0	2	2
7	October 27	0	0	1	1
8	October 28	0	1	0	1
9	October 29	0	2	0	2
10	October 30	1	4	1	6
11	October 31	1	0	2	3
12	November 1	1	0	2	3
12	November 2	0	1	1	2
13	November 3	1	3	1	5
14	November 4	3	5	11	19
15	November 5	0	3	6	9
Total		12	31	36	79

Medals by gender
**Day**	1st place, gold medalist(s)	2nd place, silver medalist(s)	3rd place, bronze medalist(s)	**Total**
Men	7	19	19	45
Women	5	10	16	31
Mixed	0	2	1	3
Total	12	31	36	79

== Competitors ==
The following is the list of number of competitors (per gender) participating at the games per sport/discipline.

Sport	Men	Women	Total
Archery	4	4	8
Artistic swimming	1	8	9
Athletics	27	23	50
Badminton	4	4	8
Baseball	24	0	24
Basketball	15	14	29
Basque pelota	6	6	12
Bowling	2	2	4
Boxing	6	3	9
Breaking	2	2	4
Canoeing	7	8	15
Cycling	17	16	33
Diving	2	0	2
Equestrian	10	2	12
Fencing	10	9	19
Field hockey	16	16	32
Football	18	18	36
Golf	2	2	4
Gymnastics	5	11	16
Handball	14	14	28
Judo	7	7	14
Karate	7	6	13
Modern pentathlon	2	2	4
Racquetball	3	2	5
Roller sports	5	5	10
Rowing	9	12	21
Rugby sevens	12	12	24
Sailing	10	8	18
Shooting	9	11	20
Softball	0	16	16
Sport climbing	5	5	10
Squash	3	3	6
Surfing	5	5	10
Swimming	10	10	20
Table tennis	3	3	6
Taekwondo	4	4	8
Tennis	3	3	6
Triathlon	2	2	4
Volleyball	14	14	28
Water polo	12	12	24
Water skiing	4	2	6
Weightlifting	3	4	7
Wrestling	10	4	14
Total	334	314	648

== Archery ==
Chile qualified a team of eight athletes (four men and four women) as hosts.

Men

Athlete	Event	Ranking Round		Round of 32	Round of 16	Quarterfinals	Semifinals	Final / BM	Rank
Athlete	Event	Score	Seed	Opposition Score	Opposition Score	Opposition Score	Opposition Score	Opposition Score	Rank
Andrés Aguilar	Individual recurve	648	24	Mirich (USA); L 2–6	Did not advance				
Andrés Gallardo	Individual recurve	652	20	Soto (CHI); L 0–6	Did not advance				
Ricardo Soto	Individual recurve	661	13	Gallardo (CHI); W 6–0	Enríquez (COL); W 7–3	Williams (USA); W 6–2	Mirich (USA); L 2–6	Bronze medal final Ellison (USA); W 6–4	3rd place, bronze medalist(s)
Alejandro Martín	Individual compound	696	14	—N/a	Abreu (BRA); W 147–147	Sullivan (USA); L 143–147	Did not advance		
Ricardo Soto; Andrés Aguilar; Andrés Gallardo	Team recurve	1961	7	—N/a		Colombia; L 2–3	Did not advance		

Women

Athlete	Event	Ranking Round		Round of 32	Round of 16	Quarterfinals	Semifinals	Final / BM	Rank
Athlete	Event	Score	Seed	Opposition Score	Opposition Score	Opposition Score	Opposition Score	Opposition Score	Rank
Javiera Andrades	Individual recurve	636	10	Pagan (CUB); W 3–0	Chénier (CAN); L 3–4	Did not advance			
Matilde Baeza	Individual recurve	576	29	Leithhold (ARG); W 3–2	GNoriega (USA); L 0–3	Did not advance			
Ariadna Esquella	Individual recurve	592	22	Nikitin (BRA); L 1–3	Did not advance				
Mariana Zúñiga	Individual compound	664	16	—N/a	López (COL); L 142–147	Did not advance			
Matilde Baeza; Ariadna Esquella; Javiera Andrades	Team recurve	1804	6	—N/a		Colombia; L 1–3	Did not advance		

Mixed

Athlete	Event	Ranking Round		Round of 16	Quarterfinals	Semifinals	Final / BM	Rank
Athlete	Event	Score	Seed	Opposition Score	Opposition Score	Opposition Score	Opposition Score	Rank
Ricardo Soto; Javiera Andrades	Team recurve	1297	7	Independent Athletes Team; L 1–3	Did not advance			
Mariana Zúñiga; Alejandro Martín	Team compound	1360	8	—N/a	United States; L 151–157	Did not advance		

== Artistic swimming ==
Chile automatically qualified a full team of nine artistic swimmers as host nation.

Athlete	Event	Technical Routine		Free Routine		Acrobatic routine		Total	
Athlete	Event	Points	Rank	Points	Rank	Points	Rank	Points	Rank
Soledad García; Trinidad García	Women's duet	180.3567	6	156.3396	6	—N/a		336.6963	6
Antonia Mella; Isidora Letelier; Josefa Morales; Nicolás Campos; Rocio Vargas; Soledad García; Theodora Garrido; Trinidad García; Valentina Valdivia	Team	203.7129	6	189.3635	6	187.6833	5	580.7598	5

== Athletics ==
Chile qualified 42 athletes (21 men and 21 women) as hosts. Besides, Chile qualified 1 extra male athlete after winning one event during the 2021 Junior Pan American Games.

Men
Track & road events

Athlete	Event	Semifinal		Final	
Athlete	Event	Time	Rank	Time	Rank
Enrique Polanco	100 m	10.57	5	Did not advance	
Enzo Faulbaum	200 m	21.55	5	Did not advance	
Martín Kouyoumdjian	400 m	46.91	3 Q	46.58	3rd place, bronze medalist(s)
Rafael Muñoz	800 m	1:49.96	5	Did not advance	
Diego Ignacio Uribe	1500 m	—N/a		3:45.56	11
Ignacio Velásquez	5000 m	—N/a		14:57.21	7
Ignacio Velásquez	10,000 m	—N/a		29:55.69	8
Carlos Díaz	10,000 m	—N/a		29:22.54	4
Martín Sáenz	110 m hurdles	—N/a		14.05	4
Cristóbal Muñoz	400 m hurdles	51.57	5	Did not advance	
Alfredo Sepúlveda	400 m hurdles	52.34	7	Did not advance	
Maurico Valdivia	3000 m steeplechase	—N/a		9:11.27	11
Cristóbal Muñoz; Martín Kouyoumdjian; Sergio Germain; Martín Zabala	4 × 400 m relay	—N/a		3:12.40	7
Hugo Catrileo	Marathon	—N/a		2:12:07	2nd place, silver medalist(s)
Matías Silva	Marathon	—N/a		2:14:16	4

Field events

Athlete	Event	Result	Rank
Pedro Álamos	High jump	2.15	12
Guillermo Correa	Pole vault	5.40	4
Cristóbal Núñez	Pole vault	5.20	9
Vicente Belgeri	Long jump	7.65	7
Luis Reyes	Triple jump	16.30	5
Matías Puschel	Shot put	16.20	12
Lucas Nervi	Discus throw	63.39	1st place, gold medalist(s)
Claudio Romero	Discus throw	NM	
Humberto Mansilla	Hammer throw	74.35	5
Gabriel Kehr	Hammer throw	74.32	6
Francisco Muse	Javelin throw	67.56	11

Combined events – Decathlon

Athlete	Event	100 m	LJ	SP	HJ	400 m	110H	DT	PV	JT	1500 m	Final	Rank
Santiago Ford	Result	11.22	7.48	14.01	2.04	50.91	14.58	49.06	4.20	63.39	5:04.16	7834	1st place, gold medalist(s)
Santiago Ford	Points	812	930	729	840	773	901	851	673	789	536	7834	1st place, gold medalist(s)

Women
Track & road events

Athlete	Event	Semifinal		Final	
Athlete	Event	Time	Rank	Time	Rank
María Montt	100 m	11.84	5	Did not advance	
Anaís Hernández	100 m	12.16	7	Did not advance	
Isidora Jiménez	200 m	24.00	4	Did not advance	
Martina Weil	400 m	51.47	1 Q	51.48	1st place, gold medalist(s)
Berdine Castillo	800 m	2:07.03	4 q	2:05.37	5
Josefa Quezada	1500 m	—N/a		4:18.92	8
Giselle Álvarez	10,000 m	—N/a		34:01.07	7
María Eguiguren	100 m hurdles	14.07	6	Did not advance	
María Arnaiz	400 m hurdles	1:00.78	5	Did not advance	
María José Calilaf	3000 m steeplechase	—N/a		10:26.89	11
Anaís Hernández; Martina Weil; Isidora Jiménez; María Montt	4 × 100 m relay	44.35	3 Q	44.19	2nd place, silver medalist(s)
Stephanie Saavedra; Berdine Castillo; María Mackenna; Martina Weil	4 × 400 m relay	—N/a		3:37.00	6
Giselle Alvarez	Marathon	—N/a		2:37:21	7
Danica Kusanovic	Marathon	—N/a		2:42:31	10

Field events

Athlete	Event	Result	Rank
Rocío Muñoz	Long jump	6.23	5
Natalia Ducco	Shot put	16.58	7
Ivana Gallardo	Shot put	15.30	11
Karen Gallardo	Discus throw	55.36	9
Catalina Bravo	Discus throw	47.97	11
Mariana García	Hammer throw	62.74	5
María Ríos	Javelin throw	48.43	11

Mixed

Athlete	Event	Result	Rank
Martín Zabala; Poulette Cardoch; Sergio Germain; Stephanie Saavedra	4 × 400 m relay	3:28.77	7

== Badminton ==
Chile qualified a full team of eight athletes (four men and four women) as hosts.

Men

Athlete	Event	Round of 32	Round of 16	Quarterfinals	Semifinals	Final / BM	
Athlete	Event	Opposition Result	Opposition Result	Opposition Result	Opposition Result	Opposition Result	Rank
Alonso Medel	Singles	Matias (BRA); L (9–21, 13–21)	Did not advance				
Fernando Sanhueza	Singles	Coelho (BRA); L (10–21, 9–21)	Did not advance				
Sebastian Vasquez	Singles	Lee (PAR); L (13–21, 18–21)	Did not advance				
Fernando Sanhueza; Sebastian Vasquez	Doubles	—N/a	Marroquín / Solís (EAI); L (7–21, 5–21)	Did not advance			
Benjamin Bahamondez; Alonso Medel	Doubles	—N/a	Oliva / Otero (ARG); L (13–21, 10–21)	Did not advance			

Women

Athlete	Event	Round of 64	Round of 32	Round of 16	Quarterfinals	Semifinals	Final / BM	
Athlete	Event	Opposition Result	Opposition Result	Opposition Result	Opposition Result	Opposition Result	Opposition Result	Rank
Vania Diaz	Singles	Jean (HAI); W (21–3, 21–0)	Richardson (JAM); L (13–21, 11–21)	Did not advance				
Ashley Montre	Singles	Bye	Oliva (ARG); W (21–13, 21–8)	Castillo (PER); L (8–21, 10–21)	Did not advance			
Valeria Santos	Singles	Bye	Oropesa (CUB); L (4–21, 5–21)	Did not advance				
Camila Astorga; Valeria Santos	Doubles	—N/a		Richardson / Wynter (JAM); L (17–21, 12–21)	Did not advance			
Vania Diaz; Ashley Montre	Doubles	—N/a		Lima / Vieira (BRA); L (6–21, 8–21)	Did not advance			

Mixed

Athlete	Event	Round of 32	Round of 16	Quarterfinals	Semifinals	Final / BM	
Athlete	Event	Opposition Result	Opposition Result	Opposition Result	Opposition Result	Opposition Result	Rank
Benjamin Bahamondez; Ashley Montre	Doubles	Mini / La Torre (PER); L (17–21, 11–21)	Did not advance				
Alonso Medel; Vania Diaz	Doubles	Barrios / Rojas (VEN); W (21–17, 21–14)	Marcano / De Boulet (TTO); W (21–15, 21–18)	Lindeman / Wu (CAN); L (5–21, 7–21)	Did not advance		

== Baseball ==
Summary

Team	Event	Preliminary round				Super Round			Final / BM / Pl.	
Team	Event	Opposition Result	Opposition Result	Opposition Result	Rank	Opposition Result	Opposition Result	Rank	Opposition Result	Rank
Chile men	Men's tournament	Mexico; L 0–16	Panama; L 0–6	Dominican Republic; L 2–12	4	Did not advance			Seventh place match Venezuela; L 0–7	8

Chile qualified a men's team (of 24 athletes) as hosts.

Preliminary round

Pos	Team	Pld	W	L	RF	RA	PCT	GB	Qualification
1	Panama	3	3	0	18	3	1.000	—	Super Round
2	Mexico	3	2	1	19	8	.667	1	Super Round
3	Dominican Republic	3	1	2	13	7	.333	2	Fifth place game
4	Chile (H)	3	0	3	2	34	.000	3	Seventh place game

Source: Santiago 2023 and WBSC Americas
(H) Hosts

October 18; 9:30	Mexico	16–0 (F/5)	Chile	Parque Bicentenario de Cerrillos, Cerrillos
October 18; 9:30		Boxscore		Parque Bicentenario de Cerrillos, Cerrillos

October 21; 15:00	Chile	0–6	Panama	Parque Bicentenario de Cerrillos, Cerrillos
October 21; 15:00		Boxscore		Parque Bicentenario de Cerrillos, Cerrillos

October 23; 15:00	Chile	2–12 (F/5)	Dominican Republic	Parque Bicentenario de Cerrillos, Cerrillos
October 23; 15:00		Boxscore		Parque Bicentenario de Cerrillos, Cerrillos

Seventh place game

October 25; 9:30	Chile	0–7	Venezuela	Parque Bicentenario de Cerrillos, Cerrillos
October 25; 9:30		Boxscore		Parque Bicentenario de Cerrillos, Cerrillos

== Basketball ==
=== 5x5 ===
Summary

Team	Event	Group stage				Semifinal	Final / BM / Pl.	
Team	Event	Opposition Result	Opposition Result	Opposition Result	Rank	Opposition Result	Opposition Result	Rank
Chile men	Men's tournament	Puerto Rico; L 66–70	Brazil; L 43–94	Mexico; W 63–59	3	Did not advance	Fifth place match Dominican Republic; W 83–75	5
Chile women	Women's tournament	Puerto Rico; W 86–60	Argentina; L 71–87	Cuba; L 48–68	3	Did not advance	Fifth place match Venezuela; L 70–79	6

==== Men's tournament ====
Chile qualified a men's team (of 12 athletes) as hosts.

Preliminary round

Pos	Team	Pld	W	L	PF	PA	PD	Pts	Qualification
1	Brazil	3	3	0	240	166	+74	6	Semifinals
2	Mexico	3	1	2	195	209	−14	4 (Note: Head to head record: Mexico 1−1 (+6), Chile 1−1 (0), Puerto Rico 1−1 (−6))	Semifinals
3	Chile (H)	3	1	2	172	223	−51	4	Fifth place game
4	Puerto Rico	3	1	2	211	220	−9	4	Seventh place game

Source: Santiago 2023
(H) Hosts
Notes:

31 October 2023
20:00

Boxscore

Chile	66–70	Puerto Rico
Scoring by quarter: 18–14, 24–17, 15–20, 9–19
Pts: Carvacho 16; Rebs: Carvacho 11; Asts: Morales 6		Pts: Vaughn 14; Rebs: four players 5 Asts: Ortiz 5

Multisport Complex 1, Santiago
Referees: Julio Anaya (PAN), Michael Scott (CAN), Franco Anselmo (ARG)

1 November 2023
20:00

Boxscore

Brazil	94–43	Chile
Scoring by quarter: 33–7, 20–8, 21–10, 20–18
Pts: Dias 21; Rebs: Crepaldi 7 Asts: Corazza 6		Pts: Jones 9 Rebs: Carrión 4 Asts: Morales 5

Multisport Complex 1, Santiago
Referees: Daniel García (VEN), Carlos Vélez (COL), Orlando Varela (HON)

2 November 2023
20:00

Boxscore

Chile	63–59	Mexico
Scoring by quarter: 14–11, 16–17, 21–22, 12–9
Pts: Carvacho 16; Rebs: Carvacho 12; Asts: Morales 8		Pts: Gutiérrez 19; Rebs: Gutiérrez 13; Asts: de Haro 4

Multisport Complex 1, Santiago
Referees: Michael Scott (CAN), Orlando Varela (HON), Franco Anselmo (ARG)

Fifth place game

3 November 2023
13:00

Boxscore

Dominican Republic	75–83	Chile
Scoring by quarter: 15–29, 19–9, 12–20, 29–25
Pts: Suero 15; Rebs: Solano 7 Asts: three players 4		Pts: Carvacho 24; Rebs: Morales 11; Asts: Morales 12

Multisport Complex 1, Santiago
Referees: Andrés Maina (URU), Krishna Domínguez (MEX), Fernando Cavalcante (BRA)

==== Women's tournament ====
Chile qualified a women's team (of 12 athletes) as hosts.

Preliminary round

Pos	Team	Pld	W	L	PF	PA	PD	Pts	Qualification
1	Cuba	3	2	1	223	194	+29	5 (Note: Cuba 86–74 Argentina)	Semifinals
2	Argentina	3	2	1	238	232	+6	5	Semifinals
3	Chile (H)	3	1	2	205	215	−10	4 (Note: Chile 86–60 Puerto Rico)	Fifth place game
4	Puerto Rico	3	1	2	207	232	−25	4	Seventh place game

Source: Santiago 2023
(H) Hosts
Notes:

25 October 2023
20:00

Boxscore

Chile	86–60	Puerto Rico
Scoring by quarter: 22–20, 28–18, 24–9, 12–13
Pts: three players 13; Rebs: Cortés 8 Asts: Cousiño 7		Pts: Benítez 17; Rebs: Meléndez 7 Asts: Harris 4

Multisport Complex 1, Santiago
Referees: Andrés Bartel (URU), Alan Dos Santos (BRA), Kevin Lei (CAN)

26 October 2023
20:00

Boxscore

Argentina	87–71	Chile
Scoring by quarter: 15–20, 25–20, 18–14, 29–17
Pts: Gentinetta 23; Rebs: Gentinetta 11; Asts: Suárez 7		Pts: Carrasco, Ovalle 13; Rebs: Ovalle 5 Asts: García 5

Multisport Complex 1, Santiago
Referees: Carlos Vélez (COL), Kristian Páez (ECU), Krishna Domínguez (MEX)

27 October 2023
20:00

Boxscore

Cuba	68–48	Chile
Scoring by quarter: 11–11, 24–16, 10–7, 23–14
Pts: Contreras 22; Rebs: Galindo 10; Asts: Montero 7		Pts: Cousiño 10; Rebs: Cousiño, Gómez 6 Asts: Novión 4

Multisport Complex 1, Santiago
Referees: Alan dos Santos (BRA), Kelsey Kisilevich (CAN), Aline García (URU)

Fifth place game

28 October 2023
13:00

Boxscore

Chile	70–79	Venezuela
Scoring by quarter: 20–16, 17–17, 18–20, 23–18
Pts: García, Ovalle 12; Rebs: Gómez 9 Asts: García 5		Pts: Durán 22; Rebs: Urbina 9 Asts: Urbina 6

Multisport Complex 1, Santiago
Referees: Carlos Vélez (COL), Micaela Prado (ARG), Fernando Cavalcante (BRA)

=== 3x3 ===
Summary

Team	Event	Preliminary round			Quarterfinal	Semifinal	Final / BM / Pl.	
Team	Event	Opposition Result	Opposition Result	Rank	Opposition Result	Opposition Result	Opposition Result	Rank
Chile men	Men's tournament	Uruguay; W 22–13	Argentina; W 22–17	1	Mexico; W 21–15	Venezuela; W 22–20	United States; L 15–21	2nd place, silver medalist(s)
Chile women	Women's tournament	Colombia; L 13–21	El Salvador; W 21–4	2	Brazil; W 18–14	United States; L 14–21	Bronze medal match Puerto Rico; W 22–11	3rd place, bronze medalist(s)

==== Men's tournament ====
Chile qualified a men's team (of 4 athletes) as hosts.

Preliminary round

Pos	Team	Pld	W	L	PF	PA	PD	Qualification
1	Chile (H)	2	2	0	44	30	+14	Quarterfinals
2	Uruguay	2	1	1	34	42	−8	Quarterfinals
3	Argentina	2	0	2	37	43	−6	

Source: Report
Rules for classification: 1) Wins; 2) Head-to-head record; 3) Points scored.
(H) Hosts

21 October 2023
20:30

Report

Chile	22–13	Uruguay
Pts: Lauler 10		Pts: Alvarez 4

Estadio Español
Referees: Sonia Maldonado (PUR) / Marie Houle (CAN)

22 October 2023
16:00

Report

Chile	22–17	Argentina
Pts: Silva 9		Pts: Ramos 7

Estadio Español
Referees: Jorge Garcia (DOM) / Yilizeth Vence (COL)

Quarterfinal

22 October 2023
20:30

Report

Chile	21–15	Mexico
Pts: Lauler 8		Pts: Zesati 10

Estadio Español
Referees: Jorge Garcia (DOM) / Sonia Maldonado (PUR)

Semifinal

23 October 2023
17:30

Report

Venezuela	20–22	Chile
Pts: Rodriguez 8		Pts: Rubio 10

Estadio Español
Referees: Sonia Maldonado (PUR) / Jorge Garcia (DOM)

Gold medal game

23 October 2023
20:00

Report

United States	21–15	Chile
Pts: Barry 8		Pts: Rubio 7

Estadio Español
Referees: Sonia Maldonado (PUR) / Jorge Garcia (DOM)

==== Women's tournament ====
Chile qualified a women's team (of 4 athletes) as hosts.

Preliminary round

Pos	Team	Pld	W	L	PF	PA	PD	Qualification
1	Colombia	2	2	0	38	17	+21	Quarterfinals
2	Chile (H)	2	1	1	34	25	+9	Quarterfinals
3	El Salvador	2	0	2	8	38	−30	

Source: Report
Rules for classification: 1) Wins; 2) Head-to-head record; 3) Points scored.
(H) Hosts

21 October 2023
18:30

Report

Chile	13–21	Colombia
Pts: Ljubetic, Morrison 5		Pts: Muñoz 9

Estadio Español Las Condes, Santiago
Referees: Sonia Maldonado (PUR), Nicolás Sarli (URU)

22 October 2023
13:30

Report

Chile	21–4	El Salvador
Pts: Ovalle 9		Pts: Lima, Rivas 2

Estadio Español Las Condes, Santiago
Referees: Nicolás Sarli (URU), Lautaro Ojeda (ARG)

Quarterfinal

22 October 2023
17:30

Report

Brazil	14–18	Chile
Pts: Domingos 7		Pts: Morrison 10

Estadio Español Las Condes, Santiago
Referees: Sonia Maldonado (PUR), Nicolás Sarli (URU)

Semifinal

23 October 2023
16:00

Report

United States	21–14	Chile
Pts: Stevens 7		Pts: Novión 8

Estadio Español Las Condes, Santiago
Referees: María Olivieri (ARG), Nicolás Sarli (URU)

Bronze medal game

23 October 2023
18:30

Report

Chile	22–11	Puerto Rico
Pts: three players 6		Pts: Torres, Vargas 6

Estadio Español Las Condes, Santiago
Referees: Lautaro Ojeda (ARG), Marie Houlie (CAN)

== Basque pelota ==
Chile qualified a full team of 12 pelotaris (six men and six women) as hosts.

Men

Athlete	Event	Preliminary round					Semifinal	Final / BM	
Athlete	Event	Opposition Score	Opposition Score	Opposition Score	Opposition Score	Rank	Opposition Score	Opposition Score	Rank
Renato Bolelli	Fronton	Miranda (BOL); W 2–0	Fernández (ARG); L 0–2	Pérez (MEX); L 0–2	González (CUB); L 0–2	4 FB	—N/a	Bronze medal match González (CUB); W 2–0	3rd place, bronze medalist(s)
Gonzalo Fouilloux	Frontball	Comas (ARG); L 0–2	Álvarez (MEX); L 0–2	Airala (URU); L 0–2	—N/a	4	Did not advance		
Esteban Romero; Julián Stabon	Doubles trinquete	Pelua / Pintos (URU); L 1–2	Rodríguez / García (MEX); L 1–2	Andreasen / Villegas (ARG); L 0–2	Escapa / Bellido (PER); W 2–0	4 FB	—N/a	Bronze medal match Pelua / Pintos (URU); W 2–0	3rd place, bronze medalist(s)
Jesús García; Julián González	Doubles frontenis	Cruz / Olvera (MEX); L 0–2	Espinoza / Espinoza (USA); L 0–2	Cardoso / García (ARG); L 0–2	Bezada / Yupanqui (PER); W 2–0	4 FB	—N/a	Bronze medal match Cardoso / García (ARG); L 0–2	4

Women

Athlete	Event	Preliminary round					Semifinal	Final / BM	
Athlete	Event	Opposition Score	Opposition Score	Opposition Score	Opposition Score	Rank	Opposition Score	Opposition Score	Rank
Rosario Valderrama	Fronton	Andrade (ARG); L 0–2	Noriega (MEX); L 1–2	Morell (URU); W 2–0	Álvarez (CUB); L 1–2	4 FB	—N/a	Bronze medal match Álvarez (CUB); W 2–0	3rd place, bronze medalist(s)
Zita Solas	Frontball	Cortez (ARG); L 1–2	Araya (CRC); W 2–0	Reyes (MEX); L 0–2	—N/a	3	Did not advance		
Emilia Domínguez; Maritxu Bastarrica	Doubles trinquete	Vicente / Cuestas (URU); L 1–2	Figueroa / Puentes (MEX); L 0–2	García / Pinto (ARG); L 0–2	Castillo / Arellano (VEN); W 2–0	4 FB	—N/a	Bronze medal match Vicente / Cuestas (URU); L 1–2	4
Magdalena Muñoz; Natalia Bozzo	Doubles frontenis	Darriba / Durán (CUB); L 1–2	Placito / Cepeda (MEX); L 0–2	Paredes / Rodríguez (PER); L 0–2	Borges / Rangel (VEN); W 2–0	3 FB	—N/a	Bronze medal match Borges / Rangel (VEN); W 2–0	3rd place, bronze medalist(s)

== Bowling ==
Chile qualified a full team of two men and two women as hosts.

Men

Athlete	Event	Ranking round		Semifinal	Final	
Athlete	Event	Score	Rank	Opposition Result	Opposition Result	Rank
Patricio Borquez	Singles	3198	18	Did not advance		
Jesús Borgueaud	Singles	3180	20	Did not advance		
Patricio Borquez; Jesús Borgeaud	Doubles	2932	12	—N/a		

Women

Athlete	Event	Ranking round		Semifinal	Final	
Athlete	Event	Score	Rank	Opposition Result	Opposition Result	Rank
Verónica Valdebenito	Singles	2880	23	Did not advance		
María José Caro	Singles	2823	25	Did not advance		
Verónica Valdebenito; María José Caro	Doubles	2780	7	—N/a		

== Boxing ==
Chile qualified 9 boxers (six men and three women).

Men

Athlete	Event	Round of 16	Quarterfinal	Semifinal	Final	
Athlete	Event	Opposition Result	Opposition Result	Opposition Result	Opposition Result	Rank
Héctor Tapia	–51 kg	Quiroga (ARG); L 0–5	Did not advance			
Tomás Barros	–71 kg	Mafauda (ARG); L KO	Did not advance			
Julio Alamos	–80 kg	Beausejour (CAN); L 2–3	Did not advance			
Andrews Salgado	–92 kg	Bye	de la Cruz (CUB); L 0–5	Did not advance		
Miguel Véliz	+92 kg	Congo (ECU); L 2–3	Did not advance			

Women

Athlete	Event	Round of 16	Quarterfinal	Semifinal	Final	
Athlete	Event	Opposition Result	Opposition Result	Opposition Result	Opposition Result	Rank
Kimberly Sandoval	–50 kg	Cedeño (VEN); L 0–5	Did not advance			
Denisse Bravo	–54 kg	Barrantes (CRC); W 5–0	Delgado (CAN); W 3–2	Chagas (BRA); L 1–4	Did not advance	3rd place, bronze medalist(s)
Tamara Maturana	–57 kg	Bye	Arboleda (COL); L 0–5	Did not advance		

== Breaking ==
Chile qualified four breakdancers (two men and two women) through the WDSF World Rankings.

Athlete	Nickname	Event	Round robin				Quarterfinal	Semifinal	Final / BM	
Athlete	Nickname	Event	Opposition Result	Opposition Result	Opposition Result	Rank	Opposition Result	Opposition Result	Opposition Result	Rank
Matías Martínez	Matita	B-Boys	Choky (PUR); W 2–0	Phil Wizard (CAN); L 0–2	Onton (CAN); D 1–1	2 Q	Lil G (VEN); W 2–0	Jeffro (USA); L 0–3	Bronze medal final Gravity (USA); W 2–1	3rd place, bronze medalist(s)
Nicolas da Fonseca	Daf	B-Boys	Ricky Rulez (COL); L 0–2	Leony (BRA); L 0–2	Lil G (VEN); L 0–2	4	Did not advance			16
Bárbara Carmona	Menta	B-Girls	Nathana (BRA); W 2–0	Mini Japa (BRA); L 0–2	Sunny (USA); L 0–2	3	Did not advance			12
Valentina Núñez	Vale Chica	B-Girls	Xunli (MEX); W 2–0	Isis (ECU); L 0–2	Luma (COL); L 0–2	3	Did not advance			9

== Canoeing ==
=== Slalom ===
Chile qualified a total of six slalom athletes (three men and three women).

Men

Athlete	Event	Preliminary round			Semifinal		Final	
Athlete	Event	Run 1	Run 2	Rank	Time	Rank	Time	Rank
Geral Soto	C-1	~~181.54~~	106.78	8	Did not advance			
Andraz Echeverría	K-1	~~130.83~~	81.85	6 Q	95.65	2	100.03	4
Kilian Ivelic	EK-1	51.51	5 Q	—N/a	4		Did not advance	
Andraz Echeverría	EK-1	51.79	—N/a	7	Did not advance			

Women

Athlete	Event	Preliminary round			Semifinal		Final	
Athlete	Event	Run 1	Run 2	Rank	Time	Rank	Time	Rank
Emilia Retamales	C-1	~~248.49~~	230.77	6 Q	273.56	5 Q	350.04	6
Florencia Aguirre	K-1	~~152.39~~	150.88	8	Did not advance			
María Jesús Inzunza	EK-1	61.93	—N/a	11	Did not advance			
Florencia Aguirre	EK-1	59.45	—N/a	9 Q	3		Did not advance	
Emilia Retamales	EK-1	75.15	—N/a	16	Did not advance			

=== Sprint ===
Chile qualified a total of 11 sprint athletes (five men and six women).

Men

Athlete	Event	Heat		Semifinal		Final	
Athlete	Event	Time	Rank	Time	Rank	Time	Rank
Michael Sobarzo	C-1 1000 m	4:13.68	3 SF	4:04.00	2 FA	3:59.43	4
Miguel Melgarejo	K-1 1000 m	3:59.23	6 SFA	3:56.18	3 FB	3:51.88	10
Camilo Arévalo; Marcelo Bormann	K-2 500 m	1:33.24	2 F	—N/a		1:34.54	5
Camilo Arévalo; Marcelo Bormann; Matías Garrido; Miguel Melgarejo	K-4 500 m	—N/a				1:24.32	4

Women

Athlete	Event	Heat		Semifinal		Final	
Athlete	Event	Time	Rank	Time	Rank	Time	Rank
María José Mailliard	C-1 200 m	48.42	2 FA	—N/a		46.18	2nd place, silver medalist(s)
María José Mailliard; Paula Morales	C-2 500 m	—N/a				1:54.43	2nd place, silver medalist(s)
Yusumy Trigo	K-1 500 m	2:02.65	3 SFA	2:04.39	2 FA	2:02.37	8
Daniela Acuña; Fernanda González	K-2 500 m	1:57.87	4 SF	1:58.63	3 FA	1:52.10	8
Daniela Acuña; Fernanda González; Maira Aguilera; Yusumy Trigo	K-4 500 m	—N/a				1:41.93	6

== Cycling ==
Chile qualified a full team of 34 cyclists (17 men and 17 women) as hosts. Besides, Chile qualified 1 extra cyclist after winning one event during the 2021 Junior Pan American Games.

=== BMX ===
Freestyle

Athlete	Event	Seeding		Final	
Athlete	Event	Points	Rank	Points	Rank
José Manuel Cedano	Men's	76.83	4 Q	85.67	2nd place, silver medalist(s)
Macarena Perez Grasset	Women's	45.00	4 Q	72.33	2nd place, silver medalist(s)

Racing

Athlete	Event	Ranking round		Quarterfinal		Semifinal		Final	
Athlete	Event	Time	Rank	Points	Rank	Points	Rank	Time	Rank
Benjamín Vergara	Men's	33.150	12 Q	9	3 Q	14	4 Q	1:10.000	7
Mauricio Molina	Men's	33.100	9 Q	8	2 Q	11	4 Q	33.900	5
Rocío Pizarro	Women's	40.620	13 Q	15	5	Did not advance			
Rosario Aguilera	Women's	38.590	12 Q	12	4 Q	18	6	Did not advance	

=== Mountain biking ===
Athlete	Event	Time	Rank
Ignácio Gallo	Men's cross-country	1:22:11	9
Martín Vidaurre	Men's cross-country	1:18:52	2nd place, silver medalist(s)
Sebastián Miranda	Men's cross-country	1:27:19	16
Catalina Vidaurre	Women's cross-country	1:23:20	2nd place, silver medalist(s)
Yarela González	Women's cross-country	-5 LAP	15

=== Road ===
Men

Athlete	Event	Time	Rank
Héctor Quintana	Road race	3:46.16	13
José Luis Rodríguez	Road race	DNF	
Martín Vidaurre	Road race	3:37.57	4
Vicente Rojas	Road race	3:46.07	19
Héctor Quintana	Time trial	49:30.27	9
José Luis Rodríguez	Time trial	49:10.18	6

Women

Athlete	Event	Time	Rank
Aranza Villalón	Road race	2:54.27	16
Catalina Soto	Road race	2:53.35	7
Karla Vallejos	Road race	2:54.26	15
Paola Muñoz	Road race	3:07.20	31
Aranza Villalón	Time trial	26:07.28	3rd place, bronze medalist(s)
Catalina Soto	Time trial	28:14.18	13

=== Track ===
Sprint

Athlete	Event	Qualification		Round of 16	Repechage 1	Quarterfinals	Semifinals	Final	
Athlete	Event	Time	Rank	Opposition Time	Opposition Time	Opposition Result	Opposition Result	Opposition Result	Rank
Joaquín Fuenzalida	Men's individual	10.432	17	Did not advance					
Diego Fuenzalida	Men's individual	10.625	18	Did not advance					
Daniela Colilef	Women's individual	11.349	11 Q	Orban (CAN); W 11.561	Bye	Barbosa (BRA); L	Did not advance		8
Paula Molina	Women's individual	11.417	12 Q	Bayona (COL); L	Barbosa (BRA); Cardozo (COL); L	Did not advance			
Mariano Lecaros; Diego Fuenzalida; Joaquín Fuenzalida	Men's team	45.960	7	—N/a				Did not advance	
Paola Muñoz; Paula Molina; Daniela Colilef	Women's team	51.000	6	—N/a				Did not advance	

Pursuit

Athlete	Event	Qualification		Semifinals	Finals	
Athlete	Event	Time	Rank	Opposition Result	Opposition Result	Rank
Héctor Quintana; José Luis Rodríguez; Jacob Decar; Cristián Arriagada	Men's team	4:15.247	6 Q	Mexico; L 4:00.298–3:57.842	Did not advance	
Scarlet Cortés; Camila García; Catalina Soto; Victoria Martínez	Women's team	4:38.790	5 Q	Venezuela; W 4:33.100–4:46.841	Did not advance	

Keirin

Athlete	Event	Heats	Final
Athlete	Event	Rank	Rank
Vicente Ramírez	Men's	4 FB	11
Daniela Colilef	Women's	2 FA	4

Madison

Athlete	Event	Points	Rank
Cristian Arriagada; Jacob Decar	Men's	43	4
Scarlet Cortés; Paola Muñoz	Women's	16	6

Omnium

Athlete	Event	Scratch race	Tempo race		Elimination race	Points race		Total	
Athlete	Event	Rank	Points	Rank	Rank	Points	Rank	Points	Rank
Jacob Decar	Men's	3	–	6	1	15	2	121	3rd place, bronze medalist(s)
Catalina Soto	Women's	5	27	1	3	12	4	120	3rd place, bronze medalist(s)

== Diving ==
Chile qualified a full team of ten divers (five men and five women) as hosts. Ultimately, ony two male divers competed.

Men

Athlete	Event	Preliminary		Final	
Athlete	Event	Score	Rank	Score	Rank
Donato Neglia	1 m springboard	324.40	10 Q	336.15	9
Diego Carquín	1 m springboard	243.90	19	Did not advance	
Donato Neglia	3 m springboard	337.60	13	Did not advance	
Diego Carquín	3 m springboard	328.95	15	Did not advance	
Donato Neglia; Diego Carquín	3 m synchronized springboard	—N/a		325.14	6

== Equestrian ==
Chile qualified a full team of four equestrians in Dressage, Eventing and Jumping as hosts.

=== Dressage ===
Athlete	Horse	Event	Prix St. Georges		Grand Prix Special			Grand Prix Freestyle	
Athlete	Horse	Event	Score	Rank	Score	Total	Rank	Score	Rank
Virginia Yarur	Ronaldo	Individual	68.674	15	71.000	—N/a	13	—N/a	
Svenja Grimm	Doctor Rossi	Individual	73.217	8	72.340	—N/a	9	78.335	8
Mario Vargas	Kadiene	Individual	68.029	17	70.412	—N/a	16	71.025	16
Carlos Fernandez	Héroe XVV	Individual	64.765	33	66.147	—N/a	27	—N/a	
Svenja Grimm; Virginia Yarur; Mario Vargas; Carlos Fernandez	See Above	Team	209.920	4	213.752	423.672	4	—N/a	

=== Eventing ===
Athlete	Horse	Event	Dressage	Cross-country	Jumping	Total	Rank
Jaime Bittner Martínez	All Red	Individual	42.4	38.0	51.2	131.6	23
Nicolás Fuentes Escala	Midnight	Individual	45.0	36.4	52.0	133.4	24
Nicolás Ibañez	Domingo	Individual	42.1	—N/a			
Guillermo Garín Heyermann	HSB Sidonia	Individual	45.2	—N/a			
Gastón Marcenal	SVR Indy	Individual	48.1	—N/a			
Nicolás Fuentes Escala; Nicolás Ibañez; Guillermo Garín Heyermann; Jaime Bittner Martínez	See above	Team	—N/a			1265.0	7

=== Jumping ===
Athlete	Horse	Event	Qualification								Final					
Athlete	Horse	Event	Round 1		Round 2 A		Round 2 B		Total		Round 1		Round 2		Total	
Athlete	Horse	Event	Time penalties	Rank	Penalties	Rank	Penalties	Rank	Penalties	Rank	Penalties	Rank	Penalties	Rank	Penalties	Rank
Samuel Parot Jr.	Hfb Versace	Individual	9.09	30	4	18	0	=1	13.09	18 Q	9	14	8	13	30.09	17
Agustín Covarrubias	Nelson du Petit Vivier	Individual	4.96	19	8	22	6	22	18.9	22 Q	0	=1	6	10	24.96	13
Jorge Matte	Winning Good	Individual	4.90	18	10	23	5	21	19.00	23 Q	8	10	12	18	39.9	18
Alexandr Imschenetzky	Caspaccio	Individual	6.89	28	34	33	8	24	48.89	33	Did not advance					
Agustín Covarrubias; Jorge Matte; Alexandr Imschenetzky; Samuel Parot Jr.	See above	Team	16.75	7	22	7	11	6	49.75	7	—N/a					

== Fencing ==
Chile automatically qualified a full team of 18 fencers (nine men and nine women) as the host nation. Jorge Valderrama and Katina Proestakis also qualified after each winning a gold medal at the 2021 Junior Pan American Games in Cali, Colombia. This mean the team size was 20 fencers (ten per gender).

Individual
Men

Athlete	Event	Pool Round		Round of 16	Quarterfinals	Semifinals	Final	
Athlete	Event	Victories	Seed	Opposition Score	Opposition Score	Opposition Score	Opposition Score	Rank
Jorge Valderrama	Épée	1V–5D	16 Q	Nuñez (CHI); L 9–15	Did not advance			
Pablo Nuñez	Épée	4V–2D	1 Q	Valderrama (CHI); W 15–9	Lazzarotto (BRA); W 15–10	Camargo (BRA); W 15–14	French (CAN); L 12–15	2nd place, silver medalist(s)
Joaquín Bustos	Épée	3V–2D	11 Q	Ferrer (CUB); W 15–14	French (CAN); L 11–15	Did not advance		
Jorge Valderrama; Pablo Nuñez; Joaquín Bustos	Men's épée	—N/a			Venezuela; L 23–33	5th–8th place classification Colombia; W 43–34	Fifth place match Brazil; L 28–45	6
Gustavo Alarcón	Foil	3V–2D	5 Q	Alarcón (CHI); L 5–15	Did not advance			
Leopoldo Alarcón	Foil	2V–3D	12 Q	Alarcón (CHI); W 15–5	Servello (ARG); L 7–15	Did not advance		
Leopoldo Alarcón; Gustavo Alarcón; Juvenal Alarcón	Men's foil	—N/a			Argentina; W 45–43	United States; L 17–45	Bronze medal final Brazil; L 36–33	4
Roberto Monsalva	Sabre	4V–2D	5 Q	Pezzi (BRA); W 15–11	Romero (VEN); L 4–15	Did not advance		
Ricardo Álvarez García	Sabre	0V–6D	18	Did not advance				
Manuel Bahamonde; Ricardo Álvarez García; Roberto Monsalva	Men's sabre	—N/a			Venezuela; L 37–45	5th–8th place classification Argentina; L 37–45	Seventh place match Brazil; L 30–45	8

Women

Athlete	Event	Pool Round		Round of 16	Quarterfinals	Semifinals	Final	
Athlete	Event	Victories	Seed	Opposition Score	Opposition Score	Opposition Score	Opposition Score	Rank
Paula Vásquez del Campo	Épée	2V–3D	9 Q	Di Tella (ARG); L 10–15	Did not advance			
Analía Fernández	Épée	2V–3D	12 Q	Asis (VEN); W 15–10	Morales (MEX); W 15–12	Di Tella (ARG); L 11–15	Did not advance	3rd place, bronze medalist(s)
Paula Vásquez del Campo; Analía Fernández; Ignacia Cifuentes	Women's épée	—N/a			Venezuela; L 32–44	5th–8th place classification Colombia; L 29–45	Seventh place match Costa Rica; W 45–41	7
Katina Proestakis	Foil	2V–3D	10 Q	Michel (MEX); L 9–15	Did not advance			
Arantza Inostroza	Foil	4V–2D	4 Q	Bulcão (BRA); W 15–11	Pistoia (BRA); L 11–15	Did not advance		
Paola Gil Piñero	Foil	1V–5D	15 Q	Kiefer (USA); L 6–15	Did not advance			
Lisa Montecinos; Katina Proestakis; Arantxa Inostroza	Women's foil	—N/a			Brazil; L 37–44	5th–8th place classification Peru; W 27–45	Fifth place match Argentina; W 45–38	5
Yolanda Muñoz	Sabre	3V–2D	5 Q	Grench (PAN); W 15–10	Toledo (MEX); L 14–15	Did not advance		
Florencia Cabezas	Sabre	2V–3D	14 Q	Skarbonkievicz (USA); L 7–15	Did not advance			
Elizabeth Mayor; Florencia Cabezas; Yolanda Muñoz	Women's sabre	—N/a			United States; L 11–45	5th–8th place classification Brazil; L 29–45	Seventh place match Colombia; L 24–45	8

== Field hockey ==
Summary

Team	Event	Group stage				Semifinal	Final / BM / Pl.	
Team	Event	Opposition Result	Opposition Result	Opposition Result	Rank	Opposition Result	Opposition Result	Rank
Chile men	Men's tournament	Peru; W 15–0	Argentina; L 1–3	Mexico; W 5–0	2 Q	Canada; W 1(3)–1(2)	Argentina; L 1–3	2nd place, silver medalist(s)
Chile women	Women's tournament	Mexico; W 10–0	Canada; W 2–0	Cuba; W 2–0	1 Q	United States; L 1(1)–1(3)	Bronze medal match Canada; W 2–0	3rd place, bronze medalist(s)

=== Men's tournament ===
Chile qualified a men's team (of 16 athletes) as hosts.

Preliminary round

Pos	Team	Pld	W	D	L	GF	GA	GD	Pts	Qualification
1	Argentina	3	3	0	0	35	2	+33	9	Semi-finals
2	Chile (H)	3	2	0	1	21	3	+18	6	Semi-finals
3	Mexico	3	1	0	2	7	16	−9	3	5th–8th classification
4	Peru	3	0	0	3	1	43	−42	0	5th–8th classification

Source: FIH
Rules for classification: 1) points; 2) matches won; 3) goal difference; 4) goals for; 5) head-to-head result; 6) field goals for.
(H) Hosts

25 October 2023
19:30

Chile	15–0	Peru
Hurtado 3'; Fel. Renz 5', 12'; Fer. Renz 10', 45'; Troncoso 16'; Richter 22'; Pizarro 35', 55'; Amoroso 44', 54'; Becerra 48'; Maldonado 48'; Valenzuela 50'; Wolansky 53'	Report

Umpires:
Ilanggo Kanabathu (MAS)
Benjamin Peters (USA)

27 October 2023
19:30

Chile	1–3	Argentina
Amoroso 60'	Report	Casella 16'; Domene 20', 48'

Umpires:
Tyler Klenk (CAN)
Benjamin Peters (USA)

29 October 2023
19:30

Mexico	0–5	Chile
	Report	Gesswein 9'; Strabucchi 13'; Amoroso 33'; Hurtado 39'; Becerra 56'

Umpires:
Oliver Höck (BRA)
Ilanggo Kanabathu (MAS)

Semifinal

1 November 2023
20:15

Canada	1–1	Chile
Johnston 25'	Report	Becerra 52'
Penalties
Johnston (penalty shoot-out missed); Panesar (penalty shoot-out missed); Van Son (penalty shoot-out scored); Pereira (penalty shoot-out scored); Guraliuk (penalty shoot-out missed)	2–3	(penalty shoot-out scored) Hurtado; (penalty shoot-out missed) Rodríguez; (penalty shoot-out scored) Becerra; (penalty shoot-out missed) Gesswein; (penalty shoot-out scored) Amoroso

Umpires:
Gabriel Labate (ARG)
Benjamin Peters (USA)

Gold medal game

3 November 2023
19:45

(gold) Argentina	3–1	Chile (silver)
Martínez 8', 51'; Bugallo 59'	Report	Richter 45'

Umpires:
Tyler Klenk (CAN)
Ilanggo Kanabathu (MAS)

=== Women's tournament ===
Chile qualified a women's team (of 16 athletes) as hosts.

Preliminary round

Pos	Team	Pld	W	D	L	GF	GA	GD	Pts	Qualification
1	Chile (H)	3	3	0	0	14	0	+14	9	Semi-finals
2	Canada	3	2	0	1	12	3	+9	6	Semi-finals
3	Cuba	3	0	1	2	2	10	−8	1	5th–8th classification
4	Mexico	3	0	1	2	1	16	−15	1	5th–8th classification

Source: FIH
Rules for classification: 1) points; 2) matches won; 3) goal difference; 4) goals for; 5) head-to-head result; 6) field goals for.
(H) Hosts

26 October 2023
19:30

Chile	10–0	Mexico
Rojas 6', 50'; Urroz 16', 20', 29', 50'; Villagrán 38', 58', 59'; Tala 55'	Report

Umpires:
Emi Yamada (JPN)
Melina Illanes (ARG)

28 October 2023
19:30

Canada	0–2	Chile
	Report	Caram 43'; Müller 44'

Umpires:
Maggie Giddens (USA)
Victoria Pazos (ARG)

30 October 2023
19:30

Chile	2–0	Cuba
Villagrán 9'; Rojas 50'	Report

Umpires:
Natalia Lodeiro (URU)
Ana Vázquez Esclanté (MEX)

Semifinal

2 November 2023
19:45

Chile	1–1	United States
Rojas 46'	Report	Sessa 12'
Penalties
Avelli (penalty shoot-out scored); Ananías (penalty shoot-out missed); Müller (penalty shoot-out missed); Urroz (penalty shoot-out missed)	1–3	(penalty shoot-out scored) Sessa; (penalty shoot-out scored) Sessa; (penalty shoot-out scored) Tamer

Umpires:
Melina Illanes (ARG)
Megan Robertson (CAN)

Bronze medal game

4 November 2023
17:30

Canada	0–2	Chile
	Report	Rojas 2', 46'

Umpires:
Maggie Giddens (USA)
Ayanna McClean (TTO)

== Football ==
Summary

Key:

- A.E.T – After extra time.
- P – Match decided by penalty-shootout.

Team	Event	Group Stage				Semifinal	Final / BM	
Team	Event	Opposition Score	Opposition Score	Opposition Score	Rank	Opposition Score	Opposition Score	Rank
Chile men's	Men's tournament	Mexico; W 1–0	Uruguay; W 1–0	Dominican Republic; W 5–0	1 Q	United States; W 1–0	Brazil; L 1–1 (a.e.t.) (2–4^{(p)})	2nd place, silver medalist(s)
Chile women's	Women's tournament	Paraguay; W 1–0	Mexico; L 1–3	Jamaica; W 6–0	2 Q	United States; W 2–1	Mexico; L 0–1	2nd place, silver medalist(s)

=== Men's tournament ===
Chile qualified a men's team of 18 athletes automatically as hosts.

Group stage

Pos	Team	Pld	W	D	L	GF	GA	GD	Pts	Qualification
1	Chile (H)	3	3	0	0	7	0	+7	9	Semi-finals
2	Mexico	3	1	1	1	1	1	0	4	Semi-finals
3	Uruguay	3	1	0	2	1	2	−1	3	Fifth place match
4	Dominican Republic	3	0	1	2	0	6	−6	1	Seventh place match

Source: Santiago2023
(H) Host
23 October 2023
20:00

Chile	1–0	Mexico
Guerrero 28'	Report

Estadio Sausalito, Viña del Mar
Referee: Bryan Loayza (Ecuador)

26 October 2023
18:00

Chile	1–0	Uruguay
Aravena 45+1'	Report

Estadio Elías Figueroa Brander, Valparaíso
Referee: Yender Herrera Toledo (Venezuela)

29 October 2023
18:00

Chile	5–0	Dominican Republic
Fuentes 15'; Alfaro 28'; Assadi 75'; Montes 90+2'; Aravena 90+5'	Report

Estadio Sausalito, Viña del Mar
Referee: Bryan Loayza (Ecuador)

Semifinal

1 November 2023
17:00

Chile	1–0	United States
Pérez 57'	Report

Estadio Elías Figueroa Brander, Valparaíso
Referee: Juan López (Paraguay)

Gold medal match

4 November 2023
20:00

Chile	1–1 (a.e.t.)	Brazil
Guerrero 42'	Report	Ronald 83'
Penalties
Zaldivia (penalty scored); Villagra (penalty missed); Fuentes (penalty scored); Montes (penalty missed)	2–4	(penalty scored) Nascimento; (penalty scored) Ronald; (penalty missed) Figueiredo; (penalty scored) Miranda; (penalty scored) Mycael

Estadio Sausalito, Viña del Mar
Referee: Yender Herrera Toledo (Venezuela)

2023 Pan American Games Men's football tournament
winners

Brazil
5th title

=== Women's tournament ===
Chile qualified a women's team of 18 athletes automatically as hosts.

Group stage

Pos	Team	Pld	W	D	L	GF	GA	GD	Pts	Qualification
1	Mexico	3	3	0	0	14	2	+12	9	Semi-finals
2	Chile (H)	3	2	0	1	8	3	+5	6	Semi-finals
3	Paraguay	3	1	0	2	11	5	+6	3	Fifth place match
4	Jamaica	3	0	0	3	0	23	−23	0	Seventh place match

Source: Santiago2023
Rules for classification: Tie-breakers
(H) Hosts
22 October 2023
18:00

Chile	1–0	Paraguay
Zamora 24'	Report

Estadio Elías Figueroa Brander, Valparaíso
Referee: Helena De Siqueira (Brazil)

25 October 2023
20:00

Chile	1–3	Mexico
Pinilla 37'	Report	Bernal 56'; Sánchez 74'; Ordóñez 88'

Estadio Sausalito, Viña del Mar
Referee: Milagros Arruela (Peru)

28 October 2023
18:00

Chile	6–0	Jamaica
Jiménez 44'; López 45+5'; Caniguán 55'; Olave 68'; José Urrutia 78'; Araya 82'	Report

Estadio Elías Figueroa Brander, Valparaíso
Referee: Paula Fernandes (Colombia)

Semifinal

31 October 2023
20:00

Chile	2–1	United States
Araya 37'; Aedo 45' (pen.)	Report	Adames 52'

Estadio Sausalito, Viña del Mar
Referee: Andreza De Siqueira (Brazil)

Gold medal match

3 November 2023
20:00

Mexico	1–0	Chile
Bernal 29'	Report

Estadio Elías Figueroa Brander, Valparaíso
Referee: Milagros Arruela (Peru)

2023 Pan American Games Women's football tournament
winners

Mexico
1st title

== Golf ==
Chile qualified a full team of four golfers (two men and two women) as hosts.

Athlete	Event	Round 1	Round 2	Round 3	Round 4	Total		
Athlete	Event	Score	Score	Score	Score	Score	Par	Rank
Mito Pereira	Men's individual	68	68	72	71	279	−9	10
Joaquín Niemann	Men's individual	67	70	71	65	273	−15	T6
Carolina Alcaíno	Women's individual	77	74	76	82	309	+21	T22
Michelle Melandri	Women's individual	74	74	72	73	293	+5	13

== Gymnastics ==
=== Artistic ===
Chile qualified a team of ten gymnasts in artistic (five men and five women) as hosts.

Men
Team final & individual qualification

Athlete	Event	Apparatus						Total	
Athlete	Event	F	PH	R	V	PB	HB	Score	Rank
Joel Álvarez	Team	13.466	12.466	13.166	13.700	~~12.033~~	12.900	77.731	14 Q
Luciano Letelier	Team	13.600	10.766	12.166	13.966	12.833	12.133	75.464	18 Q
Joaquín Álvarez	Team	—N/a		12.800	—N/a	12.900	—N/a		
Josue Armijo	Team	11.133	12.200	—N/a	13.933 Q	12.500	11.966	—N/a	
Padro Cristóbal	Team	~~10.000~~	~~10.566~~	~~11.633~~	~~12.400~~	—N/a	~~10.433~~	—N/a	
Total	Team	38.199	35.432	38.132	41.599	38.233	36.999	228.564	8

Qualification Legend: Q = Qualified to apparatus final

Individual finals

Athlete	Event	Apparatus						Total	
Athlete	Event	F	PH	R	V	PB	HB	Score	Rank
Joel Álvarez	All-around	13.333	12.266	13.266	13.733	13.666	12.666	78.930	6
Luciano Letelier	All-around	12.000	12.500	12.333	12.700	11.766	11.866	73.165	20
Josue Armijo	Vault	—N/a			13.583	—N/a			7

Women
Team final & individual qualification

Athlete	Event	Apparatus				Total	
Athlete	Event	V	UB	BB	F	Score	Rank
Makarena Pinto	Team	12.766 Q	11.133	9.866	12.033	45.798	23 Q
Bárbara Achondo	Team	11.366	11.433	11.033	12.633 Q	46.465	19 Q
Sofía Casella	Team	—N/a	~~11.066~~	10.933	~~10.966~~	—N/a	
Antonia Marihuan	Team	~~0.000~~	11.133	~~9.233~~	11.233	—N/a	
Franchesca Santi	Team	12.633 Q	—N/a				
Total	Team	36.765	33.699	31.832	35.899	138.195	8

Qualification Legend: Q = Qualified to apparatus final

Individual finals

Athlete	Event	Apparatus				Total	
Athlete	Event	V	UB	BB	F	Score	Rank
Makarena Pinto	All-around	12.566	11.500	11.233	11.833	47.132	15
Bárbara Achondo	All-around	11.400	8.266	11.100	12.333	43.099	24
Bárbara Achondo	Floor	—N/a			12.200	—N/a	8
Franchesca Santi	Vault	12.483	—N/a				5
Makarena Pinto	Vault	11.966	—N/a				8

Qualification Legend: Q = Qualified to apparatus final

=== Rhythmic ===
Chile qualified one individual gymnast and five gymnasts for the group event in rhythmic (six women) as hosts.

Individual

Athlete	Event	Apparatus				Total	
Athlete	Event	Ball	Clubs	Hoop	Ribbon	Score	Rank
Javiera Rubilar	All-around	26.700	25.250	25.500	25.900 Q	103.350	13
Javiera Rubilar	Ribbon	—N/a			25.050	—N/a	8

Qualification Legend: Q = Qualified to apparatus final

Group

Athlete	Event	Apparatus		Total	
Athlete	Event	5 hoops	3 ribbons + 2 balls	Score	Rank
Anneli Sepúlveda; Martina Espejo; Josefina Romero; Isabel Lozano; Annabela Ley	All-around	26.650 Q	19.650 Q	46.300	7
Anneli Sepúlveda; Martina Espejo; Josefina Romero; Isabel Lozano; Annabela Ley	5 hoops	22.700	—N/a		7
Anneli Sepúlveda; Martina Espejo; Josefina Romero; Isabel Lozano; Annabela Ley	3 ribbons + 2 balls	—N/a	21.300	—N/a	5

Qualification Legend: Q = Qualified to apparatus final

== Handball ==
Summary

Team	Event	Group stage				Semifinal	Final / BM / Pl.	
Team	Event	Opposition Result	Opposition Result	Opposition Result	Rank	Opposition Result	Opposition Result	Rank
Chile men	Men's tournament	Dominican Republic; W 30–21	Mexico; W 32–21	Brazil; L 28–30	2 Q	Argentina; L 26–33	Bronze medal match United States; W 28–27	3rd place, bronze medalist(s)
Chile women	Women's tournament	Canada; W 23–14	Argentina; L 15–28	Puerto Rico; W 23–15	2 Q	Brazil; L 10–30	Bronze medal match Paraguay; L 20–23	4

=== Men's tournament ===
Chile qualified a men's team (of 14 athletes) as hosts.

Preliminary round

Pos	Team	Pld	W	D	L	GF	GA	GD	Pts	Qualification
1	Brazil	3	3	0	0	117	67	+50	6	Semifinals
2	Chile (H)	3	2	0	1	90	72	+18	4	Semifinals
3	Mexico	3	1	0	2	66	102	−36	2	5–8th place semifinals
4	Dominican Republic	3	0	0	3	60	92	−32	0	5–8th place semifinals

Source: Santiago 2023
Rules for classification: 1) points; 2) head-to-head points; 3) head-to-head goal difference; 4) head-to-head goals scored; 5) goal difference; 6) goals scored; 7) draw.
(H) Hosts

30 October 2023; 20:00	Chile	30–21	Dominican Republic	Gimnasio Polideportivo de Viña del Mar; Referees: Correa, Conberse (ARG)
30 October 2023; 20:00	Salgado 7	(12–10)	Beras 6	Gimnasio Polideportivo de Viña del Mar; Referees: Correa, Conberse (ARG)
30 October 2023; 20:00	6× (suspension)	Report	1× (yellow card) 3× (suspension) 1× (red card)	Gimnasio Polideportivo de Viña del Mar; Referees: Correa, Conberse (ARG)

31 October 2023; 20:00	Mexico	21–32	Chile	Gimnasio Polideportivo de Viña del Mar; Referees: García, Paolantoni (ARG)
31 October 2023; 20:00	Rodríguez, Sánchez 4	(9–19)	Salinas 7	Gimnasio Polideportivo de Viña del Mar; Referees: García, Paolantoni (ARG)
31 October 2023; 20:00	1× (suspension) 1× (red card)	Report	1× (yellow card) 3× (suspension)	Gimnasio Polideportivo de Viña del Mar; Referees: García, Paolantoni (ARG)

1 November 2023; 20:00	Chile	28–30	Brazil	Gimnasio Polideportivo de Viña del Mar; Referees: Sosa, Lemes (URU)
1 November 2023; 20:00	Er. Feuchtmann 10	(12–15)	Dupoux, Langaro 6	Gimnasio Polideportivo de Viña del Mar; Referees: Sosa, Lemes (URU)
1 November 2023; 20:00	6× (suspension)	Report	3× (yellow card) 5× (suspension)	Gimnasio Polideportivo de Viña del Mar; Referees: Sosa, Lemes (URU)

Semifinal

3 November 2023; 20:00	Argentina	33–26	Chile	Gimnasio Polideportivo de Viña del Mar; Referees: Hansen, Madsen (DEN)
3 November 2023; 20:00	F. Pizarro 8	(17–13)	Er. Feuchtmann 9	Gimnasio Polideportivo de Viña del Mar; Referees: Hansen, Madsen (DEN)
3 November 2023; 20:00	5× (suspension) 2× (red card)	Report	1× (yellow card) 2× (suspension)	Gimnasio Polideportivo de Viña del Mar; Referees: Hansen, Madsen (DEN)

Bronze medal game

4 November 2023; 17:00	United States	27–28	Chile	Gimnasio Polideportivo de Viña del Mar; Referees: Conberse, Correa (ARG)
4 November 2023; 17:00	Corning 7	(13–15)	Ayala, Salinas 5	Gimnasio Polideportivo de Viña del Mar; Referees: Conberse, Correa (ARG)
4 November 2023; 17:00	1× (suspension)	Report	1× (yellow card) 1× (suspension)	Gimnasio Polideportivo de Viña del Mar; Referees: Conberse, Correa (ARG)

=== Women's tournament ===
Chile qualified a women's team (of 14 athletes) as hosts.

Preliminary round

Pos	Team	Pld	W	D	L	GF	GA	GD	Pts	Qualification
1	Argentina	3	3	0	0	105	42	+63	6	Semifinals
2	Chile (H)	3	2	0	1	61	57	+4	4	Semifinals
3	Puerto Rico	3	1	0	2	57	89	−32	2	5–8th place semifinals
4	Canada	3	0	0	3	44	79	−35	0	5–8th place semifinals

Source: Santiago 2023
Rules for classification: 1) points; 2) head-to-head points; 3) head-to-head goal difference; 4) head-to-head goals scored; 5) goal difference; 6) goals scored; 7) draw.
(H) Hosts

24 October 2023; 20:00	Canada	14–23	Chile	Gimnasio Polideportivo de Viña del Mar; Referees: Correa, Converse (ARG)
24 October 2023; 20:00	Lacasse, Laplante 3	(11–11)	Lovera 7	Gimnasio Polideportivo de Viña del Mar; Referees: Correa, Converse (ARG)
24 October 2023; 20:00	6× (suspension) 1× (red card)	Report	1× (yellow card) 3× (suspension)	Gimnasio Polideportivo de Viña del Mar; Referees: Correa, Converse (ARG)

25 October 2023; 17:30	Chile	15–28	Argentina	Gimnasio Polideportivo de Viña del Mar; Referees: Sosa, Lemes (URU)
25 October 2023; 17:30	Lovera 5	(9–16)	Karsten 7	Gimnasio Polideportivo de Viña del Mar; Referees: Sosa, Lemes (URU)
25 October 2023; 17:30	2× (suspension)	Report	1× (yellow card) 4× (suspension)	Gimnasio Polideportivo de Viña del Mar; Referees: Sosa, Lemes (URU)

26 October 2023; 20:00	Puerto Rico	15–23	Chile	Gimnasio Polideportivo de Viña del Mar; Referees: García, Paolantoni (ARG)
26 October 2023; 20:00	Benítez, García 4	(12–9)	three players 4	Gimnasio Polideportivo de Viña del Mar; Referees: García, Paolantoni (ARG)
26 October 2023; 20:00	1× (yellow card) 1× (suspension) 1× (red card)	Report	1× (yellow card) 1× (suspension)	Gimnasio Polideportivo de Viña del Mar; Referees: García, Paolantoni (ARG)

Semifinal

28 October 2023; 20:00	Brazil	30–10	Chile	Gimnasio Polideportivo de Viña del Mar; Referees: Conberse, Correa (ARG)
28 October 2023; 20:00	Castro 11	(19–8)	Paul 3	Gimnasio Polideportivo de Viña del Mar; Referees: Conberse, Correa (ARG)
28 October 2023; 20:00	1× (yellow card) 2× (suspension)	Report	1× (yellow card) 1× (suspension)	Gimnasio Polideportivo de Viña del Mar; Referees: Conberse, Correa (ARG)

Bronze medal game

29 October 2023; 18:00	Paraguay	23–20	Chile	Gimnasio Polideportivo de Viña del Mar; Referees: Hansen, Madsen (DEN)
29 October 2023; 18:00	Insfran 10	(14–11)	Lovera 9	Gimnasio Polideportivo de Viña del Mar; Referees: Hansen, Madsen (DEN)
29 October 2023; 18:00	1× (yellow card) 3× (suspension) 1× (red card)	Report	1× (yellow card) 1× (suspension)	Gimnasio Polideportivo de Viña del Mar; Referees: Hansen, Madsen (DEN)

== Judo ==
Chile has qualified a full team of fourteen judokas (seven men and seven women) as hots.

Men

Athlete	Event	Round of 16	Quarterfinals	Semifinals	Repechage	Final / BM	
Athlete	Event	Opposition Result	Opposition Result	Opposition Result	Opposition Result	Opposition Result	Rank
Lucas Fernández	−60 kg	Bye	Garboa (ECU); W 10–00	Rojas (COL); L 00–10	Bye	Bronze medal final Ayala (ECU); L 00–10	=5
Sebastián Pérez	−66 kg	Hernández (COL); L 00–01	Did not advance				
Juan Pablo Vega	−73 kg	Bye	Sandoval (COL); L 00–10	Did not advance			
Jorge Pérez	−81 kg	López (ESA); W 10–00	Aprahamian (URU); W 10–00	McKenzie (CUB); W 10–00	Bye	Schimidt (BRA); L 00–10	2nd place, silver medalist(s)
Daniel Arancibia	−90 kg	Páez (VEN); W 00–10	Did not advance				
Thomas Briceño	100 kg	Bye	Angulo (ECU); W 11–00	Santos (BRA); W 10–00	Bye	El Nahas (CAN); L 00–10	2nd place, silver medalist(s)
Francisco Solis	+100 kg	Bye	Cruz (CUB); W 10–00	Deschenes (CAN); W 10–00	Bye	Granda (CUB); L 00–10	2nd place, silver medalist(s)

Women

Athlete	Event	Round of 16	Quarterfinals	Semifinals	Repechage	Final / BM	
Athlete	Event	Opposition Result	Opposition Result	Opposition Result	Opposition Result	Opposition Result	Rank
Mary Dee Vargas	−48 kg	Bye	Lasso (COL); L 00–10	Did not advance	Perafán (ARG); W 10–00	Bronze medal final Lima (BRA); L 00–10	=5
Judith González	−52 kg	Barrionuevo (ECU); W 10–00	Pimenta (BRA); L 00–10	Did not advance	Lahiton (ARG); W 11–00	Bronze medal final Cordones (PAN); L 00–01	=5
Elizabeth Segura	−57 kg	Cancela (USA); L 00–10	Did not advance				
Constanza Pérez	−63 kg	Bye	De Lucía (ARG); L 00–10	Did not advance	Mera (COL); L 00–01	Did not advance	
Camila Lagos	−70 kg	Delvecchio (ARG); L 00–10	Did not advance				
Karina Venegas	−78 kg	Bye	Chalá (ECU); L 00–10	Did not advance	Cardona (CUB); L 00–10	Did not advance	
Katherine Quevedo	+78 kg	Souza (BRA); L 00–10	Did not advance				

Mixed

Athlete	Event	Round of 16	Quarterfinal	Semifinal	Repechage	Final / BM	
Athlete	Event	Opposition Result	Opposition Result	Opposition Result	Opposition Result	Opposition Result	Rank
Juan Pablo Vega; Daniel Arancibia; Sebastián Pérez; Camila Lagos; Constanza Pérez; Elizabeth Segura; Judith González; Francisco Solis; Katherine Quevedo; Jorge Pérez; Thomas Briceño; Karina Venegas	Team	Ecuador; W 4–3	Dominican Republic; L 0–4	Did not advance	Mexico; L 3–4	Did not advance	

== Karate ==
Chile qualified a full team of 12 karatekas (six men and six women) as hosts. Besides, Chile qualified 1 extra karateka after winning one category during the 2021 Junior Pan American Games.

Kumite

Men

Athlete	Event	Round robin					Semifinal	Final	
Athlete	Event	Opposition Result	Opposition Result	Opposition Result	Opposition Result	Rank	Opposition Result	Opposition Result	Rank
Enrique Villalón	−60 kg	Díaz (CUB); W 3–2	Tolentino (USA); W 2–1	Luque (MEX); L 0–1	Larrosa (URU); W 3–2	1 Q	Fernández (COL); W 7–0	Díaz (CUB); W 6–5	1st place, gold medalist(s)
Tomás Freire	−67 kg	Esparza (MEX); L 3–4	Madera (VEN); T 8–8	Figueira (BRA); W 4–3	Bye	1 Q	Velozo (CHI); W 5–1	Madera (VEN); L 3–3	2nd place, silver medalist(s)
Camilo Velozo	−67 kg	Navarro (ARG); W 4–1	Gálvez (PAN); L 2–3	Proaño (ECU); W 5–0	Ramírez (COL); W 1–0	2 Q	Freire (CHI); L 1–5	Did not advance	3rd place, bronze medalist(s)
Matías Rodríguez	−75 kg	Kasturi (USA); L 3–6	Maldonado (EAI); L 1–8	Landázuri (COL); T 1–1	Sobrinho (BRA); T 0–0	3	Did not advance		
Fabián Huaiquimán	−84 kg	Greer (PUR); W 4–2	Senpon (USA); L 2–5	Merino (ESA); L 1–9	Ramírez (EAI); T 0–0	3	Did not advance		
Rodrigo Rojas	+84 kg	Castillo (DOM); W 4–0	Irr (USA); W 2–0	Molina (ARG); W 9–0	Fernandes (BRA); W 5–4	1 Q	Salgado (BRA); W 2–2	Fernandes (BRA); W 2–1	1st place, gold medalist(s)

Women

Athlete	Event	Round robin					Semifinal	Final	
Athlete	Event	Opposition Result	Opposition Result	Opposition Result	Opposition Result	Rank	Opposition Result	Opposition Result	Rank
Fernanda Vega	−50 kg	Lahyanssa (CAN); L 1–2	Salazar (VEN); L 1–9	Polanco (DOM); L 1–8	Bye	4	Did not advance		
Valentina Toro	−55 kg	Peña (COL); L 5–6	Furumoto (CAN); T 0–0	Novak (ARG); W 6–4	Servi (PAR); W 8–0	2 Q	Fernandes (BRA); W 4–0	Torres (CUB); W 8–0	1st place, gold medalist(s)
Bárbara Huaiquimán	−61 kg	Wainwright (USA); W 4–2	Fonseca (PUR); L 1–9	Grande (PER); L 1–3	Bye	3	Did not advance		
Anastasiia Velozo	−68 kg	Cabrera (PER); W 9–0	Mosquera (COL); T 7–7	Lingl (USA); L 0–8	Bye	3	Did not advance		
Javiera González	+68 kg	Torres (COL); W 8–2	Rodríguez (DOM); L 1–8	Padilha (BRA); L 1–5	Fernández (PER); W 7–3	3	Did not advance		

Kata

Athlete	Event	Round robin				Final / BM	
Athlete	Event	Opposition Result	Opposition Result	Opposition Result	Rank	Opposition Result	Rank
Simón Luengo	Men's individual	Wong (PER); L 37.70–40.20	Conde (BRA); L 36.90–39.50	Leocadio (VEN); L 37.90–40.10	4	Did not advance	
Isidora Gallo	Women's individual	Komukai (USA); L 37.80–40.30	Yonamine (BRA); L 38.10–39.30	Dimitrova (DOM); W WDR	3 q	Bronze medal final Laos-Loo (CAN); L 39.10–40.10	4

== Modern pentathlon ==
Chile qualified four modern pentathletes (two men and two women) as hosts.

Men

Athlete	Event	Fencing ranking round (Épée one touch)			Semifinal									Final												
Athlete	Event	Fencing ranking round (Épée one touch)			Fencing	Swimming (200 m freestyle)			Shooting / Running (10 m laser pistol / 3000 m cross-country)			Total		Fencing	Swimming			Riding (Show jumping)				Shooting / Running			Total	
Athlete	Event	V – D	Rank	MP points	BP	Time	Rank	MP points	Time	Rank	MP points	MP points	Rank	BP	Time	Rank	MP points	Time	Faults	Rank	MP points	Time	Rank	MP points	MP points	Rank
Esteban Bustos	Individual	17–13	9	226	0	2:15.06	8	280	11:16.50	7	624	1130	7 Q	2	2:15.04	13	280	54.00	14	8	286	10:33.60	8	667	1461	10
Martín Gajardo	Individual	13–17	23	202	4	2:08.37	3	294	11:27.70	7	613	1113	7 Q	4	2:10.57	8	289	EL			0	10:58.80	15	642	1141	17
Esteban Bustos; Martín Gajardo	Relay	25–15	1	238	—N/a									0	1:58.32	5	314	2:19.00	33	4	267	12:31.30	7	549	1368	4

Women

Athlete	Event	Fencing ranking round (Épée one touch)			Semifinal									Final												
Athlete	Event	Fencing ranking round (Épée one touch)			Fencing	Swimming (200 m freestyle)			Shooting / Running (10 m laser pistol / 3000 m cross-country)			Total		Fencing	Swimming			Riding (Show jumping)				Shooting / Running			Total	
Athlete	Event	V – D	Rank	MP points	BP	Time	Rank	MP points	Time	Rank	MP points	MP points	Rank	BP	Time	Rank	MP points	Time	Faults	Rank	MP points	Time	Rank	MP points	MP points	Rank
María José Bravo	Individual	14–18	23	202	0	2:40.16	12	230	12:02.50	7	578	1010	7 Q	0	2:44.05	16	222	EL			0	12:18.40	12	562	986	16
Rocío Varela	Individual	12–20	26	190	2	2:52.80	13	205	14:30.20	15	423	820	14	Did not advance												
María José Bravo; Rocío Varela	Relay	14–22	8	195	—N/a									0	2:29.47	10	252	2:35.00	56	4	234	15:37.30	10	363	1044	4

Mixed

Athlete	Event	Fencing (Épée one touch)				Swimming (200 m freestyle)			Riding (Show jumping)				Shooting / Running (10 m laser pistol / 3000 m cross-country)			Total	
Athlete	Event	V – D	Rank	MP points	BP	Time	Rank	MP points	Time	Faults	Rank	MP points	Time	Rank	MP points	MP points	Rank
Martín Gajardo; María José Bravo	Relay	19–25	10	202	4	2:11.39	10	288	EL			0	13:11.00	5	509	1003	8

== Racquetball ==
Chile qualified a team of five racquetball players (three men and two women).

Men

Athlete	Event	Round of 32	Round of 16	Quarterfinal	Semifinal	Final	
Athlete	Event	Opposition Result	Opposition Result	Opposition Result	Opposition Result	Opposition Result	Rank
Jaime Nicolás Mansilla	Singles	Cueva (ECU); L 0–3 (8–11, 8–11, 6–11)	Did not advance				
Rafael Ignacio Gatica	Singles	Ugalde (ECU); L 1–3 (9–11, 10–12, 10–12)	Did not advance				
Rafael Ignacio Gatica; Rodrigo José Salgado	Doubles	—N/a	Galicia / Salvatierra (EAI); L 1–3 (9–11, 11–6, 6–11, 9–11)	Did not advance			
Rafael Ignacio Gatica; Jaime Nicolás Mansilla; Rodrigo José Salgado	Team	—N/a	Argentina; L 1–2 (2–3, 3–1, 0–3)	Did not advance			

Women

Athlete	Event	Round of 32	Round of 16	Quarterfinal	Semifinal	Final	
Athlete	Event	Opposition Result	Opposition Result	Opposition Result	Opposition Result	Opposition Result	Rank
Carla Muñoz	Singles	Morissette (CAN); W 3–0 (11–4, 12–10, 11–7)	Vargas (ARG); L 2–3 (11–9, 9–11, 11–8, 7–11, 3–11)	Did not advance			
Paula Javiera Mansilla	Singles	Lambert (CAN); L 0–3 (7–11, 9–11, 17–19)	Did not advance				
Carla Muñoz; Paula Javiera Mansilla	Doubles	—N/a	Larduet / Ferrer (CUB); W 3–0 (11–2, 11–2, 110, 12–10)	Martinez / Rodriguez (EAI); L 0–3 (6–11, 5–11, 8–11)	Did not advance		
Carla Muñoz; Paula Javiera Mansilla	Team	—N/a	Canada; L 1–2 (0–3, 3–0, 0–3)	Did not advance			

Mixed

Athlete	Event	Round of 16	Quarterfinal	Semifinal	Final	
Athlete	Event	Opposition Result	Opposition Result	Opposition Result	Opposition Result	Rank
Carla Muñoz; Paula Javiera Mansilla	Doubles	Larduet / Moyet (CUB); W 3–0 (9–11, 11–6, 11–9, 11–6)	Longoria / Portillo (MEX); L 0–3 (10–12, 8–11, 4–11)	Did not advance		

== Roller sports ==
=== Artistic ===
Chile qualified a team of two athletes in figure skating (one man and one woman) as hosts.

Athlete	Event	Short program		Long program		Total	
Athlete	Event	Score	Rank	Score	Rank	Score	Rank
Agustín Vejar	Men's	36.49	6	62.11	7	98.60	7
Mailen Olivares	Women's	31.26	9	59.83	6	91.09	7

=== Speed ===
Chile qualified a team of four athletes (two men and two women) in speed skating as hosts.

Men

Athlete	Event	Qualification		Semifinal		Final	
Athlete	Event	Time	Rank	Time	Rank	Time	Rank
Emanuelle Silva	200 m time-trial	—N/a				17.562	1st place, gold medalist(s)
Emanuelle Silva	500 m + distance	43.017	1 Q	44.106	1 Q	1:01.789	3rd place, bronze medalist(s)
Hugo Ramírez	1000 m sprint	1:24.391	5 q	—N/a		1:24.252	3rd place, bronze medalist(s)
Hugo Ramírez	10,000 m elimination	—N/a				15:22.287	3rd place, bronze medalist(s)

Women

Athlete	Event	Qualification		Semifinal		Final	
Athlete	Event	Time	Rank	Time	Rank	Time	Rank
Romina Morales	200 m time trial	—N/a				19.534	8
Romina Morales	500 m + distance	46.326	5 Q	46.894	3 q	46.481	7
Javiera Pendavis	1000 m sprint	1:31.407	9	Did not advance			
Javiera Pendavis	10,000 m elimination	—N/a				EL	6

=== Skateboarding ===
Chile qualified a team of four athletes (two men and two women) in skateboarding as hosts.

Men

Athlete	Event	Final	
Athlete	Event	Score	Rank
Martin Sandoval	Park	76.64	4
Ronald Ríos	Street	169.18	6

Women

Athlete	Event	Final	
Athlete	Event	Score	Rank
Josefina Varas	Park	62.08	6
Valentina Tobar	Street	120.55	6

== Rowing ==
Chile qualified a team of 21 athletes (ten men, ten women and one coxswain).

Men

Athlete	Event	Heat		Repechage		Semifinal		Final A/B	
Athlete	Event	Time	Rank	Time	Rank	Time	Rank	Time	Rank
Brahim Alvayay; Andoni Habash	Double sculls	6:50:47	2 SA/B	Bye		6:38.07	3 FA	6:37.45	6
Francisco Lapostol; Brahim Alvayay; Óscar Vásquez; Andoni Habash	Quadruple sculls	—N/a						5:56.65	2nd place, silver medalist(s)
Nahuel Reyes; Marcelo Poo	Pair	7:01:64	2 R	6:53.51	2 FA	—N/a		6:41.70	4
Alfredo Abraham; Ignacio Abraham; Marcelo Poo; Nahuel Reyes	Four	—N/a						5:58.18	1st place, gold medalist(s)
César Abaroa; Eber Sanhueza	Lightweight double sculls	6:26.39	2 FA	Bye		—N/a		6:25.85	2nd place, silver medalist(s)
Oscar Vásquez; Marcelo Poo; Brahim Alvayay; Francisco Lapostol; Alfredo Abraham; Ignacio Abraham; Nahuel Reyes; Andoni Habash; Isidora Soto	Eight	—N/a						5:38.42	3rd place, bronze medalist(s)

Women

Athlete	Event	Heat		Repechage		Semifinal		Final A/B	
Athlete	Event	Time	Rank	Time	Rank	Time	Rank	Time	Rank
Antonia Pichott	Single sculls	8:27:33	3 R	8:07:69	1 SA/B	8:09.25	4 FB	8:10.05	8
Melita Abraham; Antonia Abraham	Double sculls	7:24:80	1 FA	Bye		—N/a		7:03.74	2nd place, silver medalist(s)
Christina Hostetter; Victoria Hostetter; Melita Abraham; Antonia Abraham	Quadruple sculls	—N/a						6:26.81	2nd place, silver medalist(s)
Antonia Zanetta; Magdalena Nannig	Pair	7:44:53	2 FA	—N/a				7:29.59	6
Antonia Abraham; Melita Abraham; Victoria Hostetter; Magdalena Nannig	Four	—N/a						6:40.83	1st place, gold medalist(s)
Antonia Liewald; Isidora Niemeyer	Lightweight double sculls	7:15.42	1 FA	Bye		—N/a		7:11.70	1st place, gold medalist(s)
Christina Hostetter; Antonia Liewald; Antonia Pichott; Victoria Hostetter; Antonia Abraham; Melita Abraham; Magdalena Nannig; Isidora Niemeyer; Isis Correa	Eight	—N/a						6:14.78	3rd place, bronze medalist(s)

Mixed

Athlete	Event	Heat		Final	
Athlete	Event	Time	Rank	Time	Rank
Christina Hostetter; Victoria Hostetter; Oscar Vásquez; Ignacio Abraham; Antonia Abraham; Melita Abraham; Alfredo Abraham; Francisco Lapostol; Isidora Soto	Eight	5:58.47	1 FA	5:55.17	2nd place, silver medalist(s)

Qualification Legend: FA=Final A (medal); FB=Final B (non-medal); SA/B=Semifinals A/B; R=Repechage
- Results given are within the heat.

== Rugby sevens ==
Summary

Team	Event	Group stage				Semifinal	Final / BM / Pl.	
Team	Event	Opposition Result	Opposition Result	Opposition Result	Rank	Opposition Result	Opposition Result	Rank
Chile men	Men's tournament	Uruguay; W 24–7	Argentina; L 12–28	Jamaica; W 27–12	2 Q	United States; W 15–12	Argentina; L 5–24	2nd place, silver medalist(s)
Chile women	Women's tournament	Canada; L 0–36	Brazil; L 0–41	Mexico; W 27–5	3	5th–8th place classification Paraguay; L 10–14	Seventh place match Jamaica; W 34–5	7

=== Men's tournament ===
Chile qualified a men's team (of 12 athletes) as hosts.

Pool stage

Pos	Team	Pld	W	D	L	PF	PA	PD	Pts	Qualification
1	Argentina	3	3	0	0	103	24	+79	9	Semifinals
2	Chile	3	2	0	1	63	47	+16	7	Semifinals
3	Uruguay	3	1	0	2	53	59	−6	5	5–8th place semifinals
4	Jamaica	3	0	0	3	19	108	−89	3	5–8th place semifinals

Source: Santiago 2023
Rules for classification: 1) Points; 2) Head-to-head result; 3) Point difference; 4) Points scored; 5) draw.

3 November 2023
12:55

Uruguay	7–24	Chile
Try: Amaya 7'; Con: Lijtenstein (1/1) 7'	Report	Try: Bustamante 3'; Lara 3'; Videla 4'; Con: Warnken (1/2) 4', 6'; Strabucchi (1/2) 5'

Estadio Municipal de La Pintana
Referee: Talal-Azmat Chaudhry (Canada)

3 November 2023
17:55

Argentina	28–12	Chile
Try: Moneta 2'; Mare (2) 4', 7'; Lavayen 4'; Con: Mare (3/3) 2', 7', 5'; Pellandini (1/1) 5'	Report	Try: Garafulic 0'; Strabucchi 7'; Con: Warnken (1/1) 1'

Estadio Municipal de La Pintana
Referee: Francisco González (Uruguay)

3 November 2023
21:15

Chile	27–12	Jamaica
Try: Game (2) 3', 3'; Garafulic 5'; Salas 6'; Lara 5'; Con: Salas (1/2) 5'	Report	Try: Facey (2) 1', 7'; Con: McNally (1/1) 7'

Estadio Municipal de La Pintana
Referee: Cauã Santos (Brazil)

Semifinal

4 November 2023
12:30

Chile	15–12	United States
Try: Warnken (2) 3', 5'; Game 7'	Report	Try: Santos 3'; Bizer 7'; Con: Walsh (1/2) 3'

Estadio Municipal de La Pintana
Referee: Gonzalo de Achaval (Argentina)

Gold medal match

4 November 2023
18:10

Argentina	24–5	Chile
Try: Lavayen (3) 1', 2', 6'; Osadczuk 3'; Con: Lavayen (2/3) 2', 6'	Report	Try: Bustamante 0'

Estadio Municipal de La Pintana
Referee: Francisco Gonzalez (Uruguay)

=== Women's tournament ===
Chile qualified a women's team (of 12 athletes) as hosts.

Pool stage

Pos	Team	Pld	W	D	L	PF	PA	PD	Pts	Qualification
1	Canada	3	3	0	0	134	21	+113	9	Semifinals
2	Brazil	3	2	0	1	109	29	+80	7	Semifinals
3	Chile	3	1	0	2	27	82	−55	5	5–8th place semifinals
4	Mexico	3	0	0	3	5	143	−138	3	5–8th place semifinals

Source: Santiago 2023
Rules for classification: 1) Points; 2) Head-to-head result; 3) Point difference; 4) Points scored; 5) draw.

3 November 2023
11:15

Canada	36–0	Chile
Try: Logan (2) 2', 0'; De Couvreur 7'; Williams 2'; Daniels 4'; Valenzuela 5'; Con: Hogan-Rochester (3/3) 3', 7', 0'	Report

Estadio Municipal de La Pintana
Referee: Francisco Lopez (United States)

3 November 2023
16:15

Chile	0–41	Brazil
	Report	Try: Costa 1'; Silva 4'; Gomes 5'; Nicolau 7'; Lima (3) 2', 4', 6'; Con: Campos (2/4) 1', 4'; Nicolau (1/2) 2'

Estadio Municipal de La Pintana
Referee: Kristine Lovatt (Canada)

3 November 2023
19:35

Mexico	5–27	Chile
Try: González 3'	Report	Try: A. Badilla 5'; Rojas (2) 0', 5'; Araneda 2'; N. Badilla 6'; Con: A. Badilla (1/4) 7'

Estadio Municipal de La Pintana
Referee: Francisco Lopez (United States)

5th–8th place classification

4 November 2023
10:00

Paraguay	14–10	Chile
Try: Viveros 1'; Con: Viveros (2/2) 1', 4'	Report	Try: N. Badilla 1'; Villarroel 8'

Estadio Municipal de La Pintana
Referee: Kristine Lovatt (Canada)

Seventh place match

4 November 2023
15:00

Jamaica	5–24	Chile
Try: Blair 2'	Report	Try: Villarroel 2'; Ogalde 5'; Miranda (2) 7', 3'; Araneda 6'; Baeza 7'; Con: Rojas (1/2) 8'

Estadio Municipal de La Pintana
Referee: Fernando García (Mexico)

== Sailing ==
Chile qualified 13 boats for a total of 18 sailors.

Men

Athlete	Event	Opening series																		Finals				
Athlete	Event	1	2	3	4	5	6	7	8	9	10	11	12	13	14	15	16	Points	Rank	QF	SF	M / F	Points	Rank
Andrés Colombo	IQFoil	(11); DNF	(11); DNF	(11); DNF	(11); DNF	(11); DNF	(11); DNF	(11); DNF	(11); DNF	(11); DNF	10	10	10	4	10	10	10	130	10 Q	7	—N/a			10
Clemente Seguel	Laser	7	(16)	2	1	4	3	8	2	3	2	—N/a						40	2 Q	—N/a		8	40	2nd place, silver medalist(s)
Ricardo Seguel	Laser	15	13	14	13	14	13	13	17	16	21	—N/a						128	15	—N/a		Did not advance		
Diego González	Sunfish	4	1	5	1	2	2	4	2	(7)	2	—N/a						31	3 Q	—N/a		8	31	3rd place, bronze medalist(s)
Giorgio Cristi	Kite	(10); DNC	(9)	(9)	8	9	8	9	9	9	9	8	8	9	8	7	9	110	9	—N/a		9	—N/a	9
Benjamín Ahrens; Exequiel Ahrens	49er	5	6	6	(7)	6	6	5	4	3	7	5	4	—N/a				57	6	Did not advance				

Women

Athlete	Event	Opening series																		Finals				
Athlete	Event	1	2	3	4	5	6	7	8	9	10	11	12	13	14	15	16	Points	Rank	QF	SF	M / F	Points	Rank
Matilde Pavone	IQFoil	(11); DNF	(11); DNF	(11); DNF	11; DNF	11; DNF	11; DNF	11; DNF	11; DNF	11; DNF	11; DNF	9	11; DNF	9	11; DNF	11; DNF	11; DNF	139	8	5	Did not advance			
Agustina von Appen	Laser radial	7	(10)	10	8	8	10	7	7	8	5	—N/a						70	8	Did not advance				
María José Poncell	Sunfish	2	2	3	4	4	2	2	(6)	2	4	—N/a						33	3 Q	—N/a		8	33	3rd place, bronze medalist(s)
Carmen Verdeyen	Kite	(6)	(6)	4	3	5	6	5	(8); DNF	6	6	5	5	5	5	6	5	66	5	Did not advance				

Mixed

Athlete	Event	Race													Total	
Athlete	Event	1	2	3	4	5	6	7	8	9	10	11	12	M	Points	Rank
Matías Seguel; Constanza Seguel	Snipe	5	2	1	7	3	1	4	5	7	(9); DNF	—N/a		7 STP	42	5
Pedro Robles; Paula Hermán; Carmina Malsch	Lightning	3	3	1	3	3	1	3	(5)	3	3	—N/a		4	27	2nd place, silver medalist(s)
Sebastián Fuenzalida; Pipa Cisternas	Nacra 17	4	4	(5)	4	5	5	5	5	5	5	5	5	8	60	5

== Shooting ==
Chile automatically qualified five shooters (two in pistol, two in rifle and one in shotgun) as hosts. Chile qualified 10 shooters in the 2022 Americas Shooting Championships. Chile also qualified two shooters in the 2022 South American Games.

Men

Athlete	Event	Qualification		Final	
Athlete	Event	Points	Rank	Points	Rank
Daniel Vidal	10 m air rifle	615.7	13	Did not advance	
Anyelo Parada	10 m air rifle	614.0	16	Did not advance	
Anyelo Parada	50 m rifle three positions	566	18	Did not advance	
Cristóbal Robles	50 m rifle three positions	562	19	Did not advance	
Diego Parra	10 m air pistol	566	11	Did not advance	
Ignacio Díaz	10 m air pistol	557	25	Did not advance	
Ignacio Díaz	25 m rapid fire pistol	554	18	Did not advance	
Claudio Vergara	Trap	112	12	Did not advance	
Cristóbal Valenzuela	Trap	104	21	Did not advance	
Héctor Flores	Skeet	119	4	32	4
Jorge Atalah	Skeet	114	11	Did not advance	

Women

Athlete	Event	Qualification		Final	
Athlete	Event	Points	Rank	Points	Rank
Gladys Aguilera	10 m air rifle	615.1	15	Did not advance	
Allison Aguilera	10 m air rifle	608.9	21	Did not advance	
Gabriela Lobos	50 m rifle three positions	561	20	Did not advance	
Karina Vera	50 m rifle three positions	559	21	Did not advance	
Jocelyn Núñez	10 m air pistol	554	16	Did not advance	
Yasna Valenzuela	10 m air pistol	529	27	Did not advance	
Macarena Caballero	25 m pistol	552	18	Did not advance	
Jocelyn Núñez	25 m pistol	549	22	Did not advance	
Pamela Salman	Trap	104	9	Did not advance	
Alesia de Barbieri	Trap	102	12	Did not advance	
Francisca Crovetto	Skeet	120	1=	50+4	1st place, gold medalist(s)
Josefa Rodríguez	Skeet	105	10	Did not advance	

Mixed

Athlete	Event	Qualification		Final / BM	
Athlete	Event	Points	Rank	Opposition Result	Rank
Allison Aguilera; Daniel Vidal	10 m air rifle	611.8	16	Did not advance	
Gladys Aguilera; Daniel Vidal	10 m air rifle	608.1	18	Did not advance	
Yasna Valenzuela; Ignacio Díaz	10 m air pistol	554	18	Did not advance	
Jocelyn Nuñez; Diego Parra	10 m air pistol	547	22	Did not advance	
Héctor Flores; Francisca Crovetto	Skeet	135	4 QB	Bronze medal final Taylor / Smith (USA); L 36–37	4
Jorge Atalah; Josefa Rodríguez	Skeet	132	9	Did not advance	

== Softball ==
Summary

Team	Event	Preliminary round				Super round			Final / BM / Pl.	
Team	Event	Opposition Result	Opposition Result	Opposition Result	Rank	Opposition Result	Opposition Result	Rank	Opposition Result	Rank
Chile women	Women's tournament	United States; L 0–18	Mexico; L 0–8	Venezuela; L 0–13	4	Did not advance			Seventh place match Peru; L 0–10	8

Chile qualified a women's team (of 18 athletes) as hosts.

Preliminary round

Pos	Team	Pld	W	L	RF	RA	PCT	GB	Qualification
1	United States	3	3	0	34	2	1.000	—	Super Round
2	Mexico	3	2	1	17	9	.667	1	Super Round
3	Venezuela	3	1	2	17	18	.333	2	Fifth place game
4	Chile (H)	3	0	3	0	39	.000	3	Seventh place game

Source: Santiago 2023 and WBSC Americas
(H) Hosts

October 29; 16:00	Chile	0–18 (F/3)	United States	Baseball and Softball Center, Santiago
October 29; 16:00		Boxscore		Baseball and Softball Center, Santiago

October 30; 16:00	Chile	0–8 (F/5)	Mexico	Baseball and Softball Center, Santiago
October 30; 16:00		Boxscore		Baseball and Softball Center, Santiago

October 31; 16:00	Venezuela	13–0 (F/4)	Chile	Baseball and Softball Center, Santiago
October 31; 16:00		Boxscore		Baseball and Softball Center, Santiago

Seventh place game

November 2; 10:00	Chile	0–10 (F/4)	Peru	Baseball and Softball Center, Santiago
November 2; 10:00		Boxscore		Baseball and Softball Center, Santiago

== Sport climbing ==
Chile qualified a team of 10 climbers (five men and five women) by virtue of their IFSC world rankings.

Boulder & lead

Athlete	Event	Qualification						Final					
Athlete	Event	Bouldering		Lead		Total		Bouldering		Lead		Total	
Athlete	Event	Points	Rank	Points	Rank	Points	Rank	Points	Rank	Points	Rank	Points	Rank
Benjamín Vargas	Men's	84.1	5	36.1	11	120.2	7 Q	39.9	6	18.1	6	58.0	7
Benjamín Ayala	Men's	64.6	11	36.1	11	100.7	13	Did not advance					
Joaquín Urrutia	Men's	64.3	13	48	8	112.3	9	Did not advance					
Alejandra Contreras	Women's	69.8	5	33.1	4	102.9	5 Q	34.5	7	57	6	91.5	5
Ignacia Mellado	Women's	49.8	13	28	7	77.8	13	Did not advance					
Martina Castro	Women's	59.5	12	22.1	15	81.6	11	Did not advance					

Speed

Athlete	Event	Qualification			Round of 16	Quarterfinal	Semifinal	Final / BM	
Athlete	Event	Lane A	Lane B	Rank	Opposition Result	Opposition Result	Opposition Result	Opposition Result	Rank
Joaquín Tapia	Men's	~~9.40~~	8.73	15 Q	Le (CAN); L 7.85-6.10	Did not advance			
José Ledesma	Men's	6.28	~~6.41~~	9 Q	Estevez (ECU); L 6.22-5.85	Did not advance			
Anahí Riveros	Women's	8.81	~~8.93~~	6 Q	Kelly (USA); L 7.85-8.57	Did not advance			
Carmen Contreras	Women's	9.28	~~9.67~~	8 Q	Hunt (USA); L 9.30–6.76	Did not advance			

== Squash ==
Chile qualified a full team of six athletes (three men and three women) as hosts.

Men

Athlete	Event	Round of 16	Quarterfinal	Semifinal	Final	
Athlete	Event	Opposition Result	Opposition Result	Opposition Result	Opposition Result	Rank
José Tomás Gallegos	Singles	Salazar (MEX); L 0–3	Did not advance			
Matías Lacroix	Singles	Elías (PER); L 0–3	Did not advance			
José Tomás Gallegos; Matías Lacroix	Doubles	—N/a	Cárdenas / Salazar (MEX); L 0–2	Did not advance		
Agustín Carranza; José Tomás Gallegos; Matías Lacroix	Team	—N/a	Colombia; L 0–2	5th–8th semifinal United States; L 0–2	Seventh place final Independent Athletes Team; L 0–3	8

Women

Athlete	Event	Round of 16	Quarterfinal	Semifinal	Final	
Athlete	Event	Opposition Result	Opposition Result	Opposition Result	Opposition Result	Rank
Ana María Pinto	Singles	Fiechter (USA); L 0–3	Did not advance			
Giselle Delgado	Singles	Bunyan (CAN); L 0–3	Did not advance			
Ana María Pinto; Giselle Delgado	Doubles	—N/a	López / Gasca (MEX); W 2–0	Sobhy / Fiechter (USA); L 0–2	Did not advance	3rd place, bronze medalist(s)
Ana María Pinto; Antónia Vera; Giselle Delgado	Team	—N/a	Barbados; L 0–2	5th–8th semifinal Independent Athletes Team; W 2–1	Fifth place final Mexico; L 0–2	6

Mixed

Athlete	Event	Quarterfinal	Semifinal	Final / BM	
Athlete	Event	Opposition Result	Opposition Result	Opposition Result	Rank
Agustín Carranza; Antónia Vera	Doubles	Quisquinay / Gaitan (EAI); L 0–2	Did not advance		

== Surfing ==
Chile qualified a full team of ten athletes (five men and five women) as hosts.

=== Shortboard ===
Athlete	Event	Round 1	Round 2	Round 3	Round 4	Repechage 1	Repechage 2	Repechage 3	Repechage 4	Repechage 5	Bronze medal heat	Final	Rank
Athlete	Event	Opposition Result	Opposition Result	Opposition Result	Opposition Result	Opposition Result	Opposition Result	Opposition Result	Opposition Result	Opposition Result	Opposition Result	Opposition Result	Rank
Guillermo Satt	Men's shortboard	Mesinas (PER); L 8.67–17.67	Did not advance			Radzunias (ARG); W 10.53–5.84	Usuna (ARG); L 9.90–10.96	Did not advance					
Manuel Selman	Men's shortboard	Cleland (MEX); L 9.77–12.83	Did not advance			Elizondo (PAN); W 7.50–6.60	González (PAN); L 4.86–10.50	Did not advance					
Estela López	Women's shortboard	Aguirre (PER); W 10.27–0.67	Tuach (BAR); W 10.90–10.50	McGonagle (CRC); L 5.33–8.16	Did not advance	Bye			Aguirre (PER); W 8.50–0.00	Dempfle-Olin (CAN); L 4.23–11.33	Did not advance		
Jessica Anderson	Women's shortboard	Weston-Webb (BRA); L 9.20–12.50	Did not advance			Indurain (ARG); L 9.43–12.60	Did not advance						

=== Longboard and SUP surf ===
Athlete	Event	Round 1		Round 2		Round 3	Round 4	Repechage round 1	Repechage round 2	Repechage round 3	Repechage round 4	Bronze medal heat	Final	Rank
Athlete	Event	Points	Rank	Points	Rank	Opposition Result	Opposition Result	Opposition Result	Opposition Result	Opposition Result	Opposition Result	Opposition Result	Opposition Result	Rank
Gabriel Salazar	Men's stand up paddleboard	6.73	3 R	Did not advance				Faccin (ARG); Aviles (CRC); W 11.73	Martino (PER); W 16.60–14.60	Rodríguez (MEX); W 10.77–10.66	Spencer (CAN); L 7.94–9.37	Did not advance		
María José Lagos	Women's stand up paddleboard	5.37	2 Q	3.17	3 R	Did not advance		Bye	Bruhwiler (CAN); L 7.44–9.00	Did not advance				
Rafael Cortéz	Men's longboard	11.90	2 Q	12.17	2 Q	Clemente (PER); L 8.60–14.17	Did not advance	Bye		Robbins (USA); W 8.50–7.17	Schweizer (URU); L 12.83–11.90	Bahia (BRA); W 14.26–3.10	Clemente (PER); L 10.37–12.16	2nd place, silver medalist(s)
Samantha Wilson	Women's longboard	3.74	3 R	Did not advance				Reyes Dias (CRC); Bonilla (MEX); W 3.53	Stokes (CAN); L 7.03–8.00	Did not advance				

=== Race ===
Athlete	Event	Time	Rank
Ignacio Besa	Men's stand up paddleboard	22:01.9	9
Carla Pérez	Women's stand up paddleboard	20:50.1	10

== Swimming ==
Chile qualified 38 swimmers (19 men and 19 women) as hosts. Besides, Chile qualified 1 extra male swimmer after winning one event during the 2021 Junior Pan American Games.

Men

Athlete	Event	Heat		Final	
Athlete	Event	Time	Rank	Time	Rank
Elías Ardiles	50 m freestyle	24.14	25	Did not advance	
Mariano Lazzerini	50 m freestyle	23.13	17 q	23.06	16
Benjamín Schnapp	100 m freestyle	52.02	22	Did not advance	
Elías Ardiles	100 m freestyle	52.51	24	Did not advance	
Gabriel Araya	200 m freestyle	1:57.19	20	Did not advance	
Eduardo Cisternas	400 m freestyle	3:56.31	7 Q	3:54.70	7
Eduardo Cisternas	800 m freestyle	—N/a		8:11.13	9
Eduardo Cisternas	1500 m freestyle	—N/a		16:02.34	14
Edhy Vargas	100 m backstroke	58.30	20	Did not advance	
Maximiliano Ahumada	100 m backstroke	58.86	22	Did not advance	
Edhy Vargas	200 m backstroke	2:06.28	14 q	2:05.40	13
Mariano Lazzerini	100 m breaststroke	1:01.90	9 q	1:02.11	11
Maximiliano Cereda	100 m breaststroke	1:04.31	20	Did not advance	
Vicente Villanueva	100 m breaststroke	1:03.80	19	Did not advance	
Mariano Lazzerini	200 m breaststroke	2:17.37	13 q	2:16.75	11
Vicente Villanueva	200 m breaststroke	2:18.47	15 q	2:17.06	12
Benjamín Schnapp	100 m butterfly	54.56	12 q	54.35	11
Elías Ardiles	100 m butterfly	55.04	16 q	54.60	13
Gabriel Araya	200 m butterfly	2:08.55	17	Did not advance	
Manuel Osório	200 m individual medley	2:08.50	18	Did not advance	
Vicente Villanueva	200 m individual medley	2:10.00	21	Did not advance	
Manuel Osório	400 m individual medley	4:41.07	16	Did not advance	
Eduardo Cisternas; Elías Ardiles; Gabriel Araya; Mariano Lazzerini	4 × 200 m freestyle relay	7:58.46	7 Q	7:36.29	6
Benjamín Schnapp; Elías Ardiles; Mariano Lazzerini; Maximiliano Ahumada	4 × 100 m medley relay	3:47.76	7 Q	3:43.11	7
Edhy Vargas	10 km marathon	—N/a		2:06:02.5	19

Women

Athlete	Event	Heat		Final	
Athlete	Event	Time	Rank	Time	Rank
Inés Marín	50 m freestyle	26.57	20	Did not advance	
Sarah Szklaruk	50 m freestyle	27.25	25	Did not advance	
Inés Marín	100 m freestyle	57.45	15 q	57.03	11
Montserrat Spielmann	100 m freestyle	59.08	28	Did not advance	
Inés Marín	200 m freestyle	2:03.03	9 q	2:03.33	11
Kristel Kobrich	800 m freestyle	—N/a		8:35.69	4
Mahina Valdivia	800 m freestyle	—N/a		9:21.95	12
Kristel Kobrich	1500 m freestyle	—N/a		16:14.59	2nd place, silver medalist(s)
Martina Röper	100 m backstroke	1:07.94	26	Did not advance	
Sarah Szklaruk	100 m backstroke	1:04.71	21	Did not advance	
Martina Röper	200 m backstroke	2:25.52	23	Did not advance	
Sarah Szklaruk	200 m backstroke	2:19.72	15 q	2:21.38	14
Antonia Cubillos	100 m breaststroke	1:15.11	18	Did not advance	
Antonia Cubillos	200 m breaststroke	2:39.53	14 q	2:38.17	14
Arantza Salazar	200 m breaststroke	2:50.14	20	Did not advance	
Montserrat Spielmann	100 m butterfly	1:02.53	17	Did not advance	
Arantza Salazar	200 m butterfly	2:29.99	18 q	2:28.71	16
Montserrat Spielmann	200 m butterfly	2:20.69	13 q	2:20.49	12
Montserrat Spielmann	200 m individual medley	2:30.33	22	Did not advance	
Sarah Szklaruk	200 m individual medley	2:30.33	21	Did not advance	
Florencia Orpis	400 m individual medley	5:23.02	19	Did not advance	
Giuliana Alberti	400 m individual medley	5:20.29	18	Did not advance	
Giuliana Alberti; Inés Marín; Montserrat Spielmann; Sarah Szklaruk	4 × 200 m freestyle relay	8:33.60	8 Q	8:26.66	6
Antonia Cubillos; Inés Marín; Montserrat Spielmann; Sarah Szklaruk	4 × 100 m medley relay	4:18.81	9	Did not advance	
Mahina Valdivia	10 km marathon	—N/a		2:04:37.1	12

Mixed

Athletes	Event	Heat		Final	
Athletes	Event	Time	Rank	Time	Rank
Inés Marín; Manuel Osório; Maximiliano Ahumada; Sarah Szklaruk	4 × 100 m freestyle relay	3:53.32	14	Did not advance	
Gabriel Araya; Maximiliano Cereceda; Montserrat Spielmann; Sarah Szklaruk	4 × 100 m medley relay	4:06.25	9	Did not advance	

== Table tennis ==
Chile qualified a full team of six athletes (three men and three women) as hosts.

Men

Athlete	Event	Group stage			Round of 32	Round of 16	Quarterfinal	Semifinal	Final	
Athlete	Event	Opposition Result	Opposition Result	Rank	Opposition Result	Opposition Result	Opposition Result	Opposition Result	Opposition Result	Rank
Gustavo Gómez	Singles	—N/a			Orantes (ESA); W 4–1	Miño (ECU); W 4–2	Calderano (BRA); L 0–4	Did not advance		
Nicolas Burgos	Singles	—N/a			Castro (MEX); W 4–1	Ishiy (BRA); W 4–1	Wang (CAN); L 2–4	Did not advance		
Gustavo Gómez; Nicolas Burgos	Doubles	—N/a				Bye	Fernández / Hidalgo (PER); W 4–0	Ishiy / Calderano (BRA); L 2–4	Did not advance	3rd place, bronze medalist(s)
Alfonso Olave; Gustavo Gómez; Nicolas Burgos	Team	Argentina; L 0–3	Peru; L 2–3	3	Did not advance					

Women

Athlete	Event	Group stage			Round of 32	Round of 16	Quarterfinal	Semifinal	Final	
Athlete	Event	Opposition Result	Opposition Result	Rank	Opposition Result	Opposition Result	Opposition Result	Opposition Result	Opposition Result	Rank
María Paulina Vega	Singles	—N/a			Suarez (ESA); W 3–0	Wang (USA); L 0–4	Did not advance			
Zhiying Zeng	Singles	—N/a			Brito (DOM); W 4–2	Zhang (USA); L 0–4	Did not advance			
Daniela Ortega; María Paulina Vega	Doubles	—N/a				Bye	Barcenas / Cossio (MEX); W 4–3	Wang / Sung (USA); L 2–4	Did not advance	3rd place, bronze medalist(s)
Daniela Ortega; María Paulina Vega; Zhiying Zeng	Team	Brazil; L 0–3	Colombia; W 3–0	2 Q	—N/a		Mexico; W 3–2	Puerto Rico; L 0–3	Did not advance	3rd place, bronze medalist(s)

Mixed

Athlete	Event	Round of 32	Round of 16	Quarterfinal	Semifinal	Final	
Athlete	Event	Opposition Result	Opposition Result	Opposition Result	Opposition Result	Opposition Result	Rank
Nicolas Burgos; María Paulina Vega	Doubles	Bye	Paredes / Miño (ECU); W 4–0	Díaz / Afanador (PUR); W 4–2	Campos / Fonseca (CUB); L 3–4	Did not advance	3rd place, bronze medalist(s)

== Taekwondo ==
Chile has qualified a full team of 10 athletes (five men and five women) as hosts.

Kyorugi

Men

Athlete	Event	Round of 16	Quarterfinals	Semifinals	Repechage	Final/ BM	
Athlete	Event	Opposition Result	Opposition Result	Opposition Result	Opposition Result	Opposition Result	Rank
Aaron Contreras	–58 kg	Garrido (COL); L 0–2	Did not advance				
Ignacio Morales	–68 kg	Pinas (SUR); W 2–0	Park (CAN); L 1–2	Did not advance			
Joaquin Churchill	–80 kg	Mercier (CAN); W 2–0	Rodriguez (USA); L 1–2	Did not advance			
Joaquin Churchill; Ignacio Morales; Aaron Contreras	Team	Bye	(Colombia) Colombia; W 83–76	(Mexico) Mexico; W 81–64	—N/a	(Brazil) Brazil; L 16–48	2nd place, silver medalist(s)

Women

Athlete	Event	Round of 16	Quarterfinals	Semifinals	Repechage	Final / BM	
Athlete	Event	Opposition Result	Opposition Result	Opposition Result	Opposition Result	Opposition Result	Rank
Deisy Guelet	–49 kg	Pérez (CUB); W 2–1	Sancho (CRC); W 0–2	Souza (MEX); L 0–2	—N/a	Bronze medal final Sendra (ARG); L 0–2	=5
Claudia Gallardo	–67 kg	Vásquez (PER); W 2–0	Lee (HAI); L 1–1	Did not advance	Molina (HON); W 2–0	Bronze medal final Kraayeveld (CAN); W 2–0	3rd place, bronze medalist(s)
Claudia Gallardo; Javiera López; Deisy Guelet	Team	Bye	(Brazil) Brazil; L 16–57	Did not advance			

Poomsae

Athlete	Event	Round of 16	Quarterfinals	Semifinals	Repechage	Final / BM	
Athlete	Event	Opposition Result	Opposition Result	Opposition Result	Opposition Result	Opposition Result	Rank
Jonathan Farías	Men's individual	Bye	Colón (PUR); L 7.360–7.410	Did not advance			
Constanza Moya	Women's individual	Bye	Lee Kim (MEX); L 7.210–7.490	Did not advance			
Jonathan Farías; Constanza Moya	Mixed pairs	—N/a				6.580	10

== Tennis ==
Chile qualified a full team of six athletes (three men and three women) as hosts.

Men

Athlete	Event	Round of 64	Round of 32	Round of 16	Quarterfinal	Semifinal	Final / BM	
Athlete	Event	Opposition Result	Opposition Result	Opposition Result	Opposition Result	Opposition Result	Opposition Result	Rank
Tomás Barrios	Singles	Bye	King (BAR); W 4–6, 6–3, 7–5	Bicknell (JAM); W 6–3, 6–7^{(2–7)}, 6–2	Hardt (DOM); W 2–6, 6–4, 6–4	Monteiro (BRA); W 6–3, 6–1	Acosta (ARG); L 3–6, 6–7^{(5–7)}	2nd place, silver medalist(s)
Gonzalo Lama	Singles	Bye	Escarra (PAR); W 6–1, 6–1	Monteiro (BRA); L 3–6, 4–6	Did not advance			
Alejandro Tabilo	Singles	Bye	Flores (CRC); W 6–4, 6–3	Vallejo (PAR); L 6–4, 6–7^{(6–8)}, 5–7	Did not advance			
Tomás Barrios; Alejandro Tabilo	Doubles	—N/a		Escobedo / Rubio (MEX); W 6–3, 6–2	Mejía / Barrientos (COL); W 7–6^{(7–1)}, 6–0	Crespo / Flores (CRC); W 6–1, 6–3	Heide / Demoliner (BRA); L 1–6, 6–2, [9–11]	2nd place, silver medalist(s)

Women

Athlete	Event	Round of 64	Round of 32	Round of 16	Quarterfinal	Semifinal	Final / BM	
Athlete	Event	Opposition Result	Opposition Result	Opposition Result	Opposition Result	Opposition Result	Opposition Result	Rank
Fernanda Labraña	Singles	Bye	Williford (DOM); W 4–6, 6–1, 6–4	Carlé (ARG); L 2–6, 2–6	Did not advance			
Daniela Seguel	Singles	Bye	Moyano (ARG); W 6–3, 6–4	Loeb (USA); L 2–6, 5–7	Did not advance			
Alexa Guarachi; Fernanda Labraña	Doubles	—N/a		Bye	Rodríguez / Licht (URU); W 6–0, 6–3	Pigossi / Stefani (BRA); L 2–6, 3–6	Bronze medal match Carlé / Riera (ARG); L 3–6, 3–6	4

Mixed

Athlete	Event	Round of 16	Quarterfinal	Semifinal	Final / BM	
Athlete	Event	Opposition Result	Opposition Result	Opposition Result	Opposition Result	Rank
Alexa Guarachi; Gonzalo Lama	Doubles	Capurro / Acosta (ARG); L 3–6, 7–6^{(11–9)}, [9–11]	Did not advance			

== Triathlon ==
Chile qualified a triathlon team of four athletes (two men and two women) as hosts.

Individual

Athlete	Event	Swim (1.5 km)	Trans 1	Bike (40 km)	Trans 2	Run (10 km)	Total	Rank
Diego Moya	Men's	17:41	0:46	56:18	0:25	31:56	1:47:09	8
Gaspar Riveros	Men's	18:21	0:48	55:37	0:24	31:46	1:46:58	6
Catalina Salazar	Women's	19:41	1:03	1:03:28	0:30	38:57	2:03:41	20
Dominga Jacome	Women's	19:37	0:56	1:01:47	0:30	37:42	2:00:34	13

Relay

Athlete	Event	Swimming (300 m)	Transition 1	Biking (6.6 km)	Transition2	Running (1.5 km)	Total	Rank
Diego Moya	Mixed relay	3:04	0:44	9:03	0:22	4:33	17:49	—N/a
Dominga Jacome	Mixed relay	4:13	0:53	9:31	0:28	5:23	38:19	—N/a
Gaspar Riveros	Mixed relay	3:40	0:43	9:04	0:28	4:45	57:01	—N/a
Catalina Salazar	Mixed relay	4:18	1:01	10:18	0:30	5:45	1:18.56	—N/a
Total	Mixed relay	—N/a					1:18:56	8

== Volleyball ==
=== Beach ===
Chile qualified a men's and women's pair for a total of four athletes as hosts.

Athlete	Event	Group stage				Round of 16	Quarterfinal	Semifinal	Final / BM	
Athlete	Event	Opposition Result	Opposition Result	Opposition Result	Rank	Opposition Result	Opposition Result	Opposition Result	Opposition Result	Rank
Esteban Grimalt; Marco Grimalt	Men's tournament	Mora / López (NCA); W 2–0 (21–13, 21–17)	Massare / Melgarejo (PAR); W 2–0 (21–18, 21–13)	Sarabia / Virgen (MEX); W 2–0 (21–17, 21–16)	1 Q	Bye	Macneil / Russell (CAN); W 2–0 (23–21, 21–18)	Stein / Wanderley (BRA); L 0–2 (13–21, 17–21)	Bronze medal match Webber / Smith (USA); W 2–1 (21–14, 18–21, 15–12)	3rd place, bronze medalist(s)
Chris Vorpahl; Francisca Rivas	Women's tournament	Araya / Williams (CRC); W 2–0 (21–12, 21–19)	Simisterra / Vilela (ECU); W 2–1 (21–17, 16–21, 18–16)	Gutiérrez / Flores (MEX); L 0–2 (14–21, 15–21)	2 Q	Ríos / Guzmán (COL); W 2–0 (21–18, 21–16)	Quiggle / Murphy (USA); L 0–2 (18–21, 16–21)	5th–8th semifinals Gaona / Allcca (PER); L 0–2 (18–21, 20–22)	Seventh place match González / Navas (PUR); L 1–2 (19–21, 21–18, 9–15)	8

=== Indoor ===
Summary

Team	Event	Group stage				Quarterfinal	Semifinal	Final / BM / Pl.	
Team	Event	Opposition Result	Opposition Result	Opposition Result	Rank	Opposition Result	Opposition Result	Opposition Result	Rank
Chile men	Men's tournament	Dominican Republic; W 3–1	Puerto Rico; W 3–1	Argentina; L 0–3	2 Q	Colombia; L 1–3	5th–8th semifinals Dominican Republic; L 2–3	Seventh place match Puerto Rico; W 3–0	7
Chile women	Women's tournament	Dominican Republic; L 0–3	Colombia; W 3–0	Mexico; L 1–3	3 Q	Argentina; L 2–3	5th–8th semifinals Cuba; W 3–0	Fifth place match Colombia; W 3–0	5

==== Men's tournament ====
Chile qualified a men's team (of 12 athletes) as hosts.

Group stage

Pos	Team	Pld	W	L	Pts	SPW	SPL	SPR	SW	SL	SR
1	Argentina	3	3	0	9	251	208	1.207	9	1	9.000
2	Chile	3	2	1	6	253	253	1.000	6	5	1.200
3	Puerto Rico	3	1	2	3	245	264	0.928	4	7	0.571
4	Dominican Republic	3	0	3	0	265	289	0.917	3	9	0.333

Source: Santiago 2023

30 October 2023; 20:30	Chile	3–1	Dominican Republic	Arena Parque O'Higgins, Santiago; Attendance: 9,752
30 October 2023; 20:30	(25–20, 21–25, 25–22, 25–21); P2P3			Arena Parque O'Higgins, Santiago; Attendance: 9,752

31 October 2023; 20:30	Chile	3–1	Puerto Rico	Arena Parque O'Higgins, Santiago; Attendance: 10,000
31 October 2023; 20:30	(26–28, 25–18, 25–21, 25–23); P2P3			Arena Parque O'Higgins, Santiago; Attendance: 10,000

1 November 2023; 20:30	Chile	0–3	Argentina	Arena Parque O'Higgins, Santiago; Attendance: 10,000
1 November 2023; 20:30	(15–25, 20–25, 21–25); P2P3			Arena Parque O'Higgins, Santiago; Attendance: 10,000

Quarterfinal

2 November 2023; 10:30	Chile	1–3	Colombia	Arena Parque O'Higgins, Santiago; Attendance: 9,800
2 November 2023; 10:30	(20–25, 25–21, 19–25, 23–25); P2P3			Arena Parque O'Higgins, Santiago; Attendance: 9,800

5th–8th semifinals

3 November 2023; 10:30	Dominican Republic	3–2	Chile	Arena Parque O'Higgins, Santiago
3 November 2023; 10:30	(22–25, 25–19, 21–25, 26–24, 16–14)			Arena Parque O'Higgins, Santiago

Seventh place match

4 November 2023; 10:00	Chile	3–0	Puerto Rico	Arena Parque O'Higgins, Santiago
4 November 2023; 10:00	(25–22, 25–15, 25–18)			Arena Parque O'Higgins, Santiago

==== Women's tournament ====
Chile qualified a women's team (of 12 athletes) as hosts.

Group stage

Pos	Team	Pld	W	L	Pts	SPW	SPL	SPR	SW	SL	SR
1	Dominican Republic	3	3	0	9	225	149	1.510	9	0	MAX
2	Mexico	3	2	1	6	225	204	1.103	6	4	1.500
3	Chile	3	1	2	3	205	231	0.887	4	6	0.667
4	Colombia	3	0	3	0	158	229	0.690	0	9	0.000

Source: Santiago 2023

21 October 2023; 20:30	Chile	0–3	Dominican Republic	Arena Parque O'Higgins, Santiago; Attendance: 8,000
21 October 2023; 20:30	(18–25, 17–25, 11–25); P2 P3			Arena Parque O'Higgins, Santiago; Attendance: 8,000

22 October 2023; 20:30	Chile	3–0	Colombia	Arena Parque O'Higgins, Santiago; Attendance: 12,000
22 October 2023; 20:30	(29–27, 25–23, 25–7); P2 P3			Arena Parque O'Higgins, Santiago; Attendance: 12,000

23 October 2023; 20:30	Chile	1–3	Mexico	Arena Parque O'Higgins, Santiago; Attendance: 9,000
23 October 2023; 20:30	(26–24, 21–25, 15–25, 18–25); P2 P3			Arena Parque O'Higgins, Santiago; Attendance: 9,000

Quarterfinal

24 October 2023; 13:30	Argentina	3–2	Chile	Arena Parque O'Higgins, Santiago; Attendance: 6,000
24 October 2023; 13:30	(25–19, 25–9, 21–25, 23–25, 15–7); P2 P3			Arena Parque O'Higgins, Santiago; Attendance: 6,000

5th–8th semifinals

25 October 2023; 13:30	Cuba	0–3	Chile	Arena Parque O'Higgins, Santiago; Attendance: 5,000
25 October 2023; 13:30	(15–25, 26–28, 17–25); P2 P3			Arena Parque O'Higgins, Santiago; Attendance: 5,000

Fifth place match

26 October 2023; 13:00	Colombia	0–3	Chile	Arena Parque O'Higgins, Santiago; Attendance: 7,000
26 October 2023; 13:00	(21–25, 20–25, 17–25); P2 P3			Arena Parque O'Higgins, Santiago; Attendance: 7,000

== Water polo ==
Summary

Team	Event	Group stage				Quarterfinals	Semifinal	Final / BM / Pl.	
Team	Event	Opposition Result	Opposition Result	Opposition Result	Rank	Opposition Result	Opposition Result	Opposition Result	Rank
Chile men	Men's tournament	Canada; L 4–24	Argentina; L 3–16	Cuba; L 9–13	4	United States; L 2–28	5th–8th place semifinals Puerto Rico; L 6–16	Seventh place match Cuba; L 7(4)–7(5)	8
Chile women	Women's tournament	United States; L 0–35	Brazil; L 2–31	Puerto Rico; L 12–14	4	Canada; L 2–33	5th–8th place semifinals Cuba; L 13–15	Seventh place match Puerto Rico; L 13–18	8

=== Men's tournament ===
Chile qualified a men's team (of 12 athletes) as hosts.

Preliminary round

Pos	Team	Pld	W	PSW	PSL	L	GF	GA	GD	Pts	Qualification
1	Canada	3	3	0	0	0	71	18	+53	9	Quarterfinals
2	Argentina	3	2	0	0	1	43	21	+22	6	Quarterfinals
3	Cuba	3	1	0	0	2	24	58	−34	3	Quarterfinals
4	Chile (H)	3	0	0	0	3	16	57	−41	0	Quarterfinals

Source: Santiago 2023
Rules for classification: 1) points; 2) head-to-head points; 3) head-to-head goal difference; 4) head-to-head number of goals scored; 5) goal difference.
(H) Host

30 October 2023; 19:30	Report	Canada	28–4	Chile	Aquatic Center, Santiago; Referees: Teodoro de Brito (BRA); Arellano Jr (MEX)
30 October 2023; 19:30	Report	Score by quarters: 7–0, 7–2, 9–0, 5–2			Aquatic Center, Santiago; Referees: Teodoro de Brito (BRA); Arellano Jr (MEX)
30 October 2023; 19:30	Report	Halajian 5	Goals	four players 1	Aquatic Center, Santiago; Referees: Teodoro de Brito (BRA); Arellano Jr (MEX)

31 October 2023; 19:30	Report	Argentina	16–3	Chile	Aquatic Center, Santiago; Referees: Dabbaghian (USA); Castillo Torres (PUR)
31 October 2023; 19:30	Report	Score by quarters: 3–0, 4–1, 5–0, 4–2			Aquatic Center, Santiago; Referees: Dabbaghian (USA); Castillo Torres (PUR)
31 October 2023; 19:30	Report	Tilatti 4	Goals	three players 1	Aquatic Center, Santiago; Referees: Dabbaghian (USA); Castillo Torres (PUR)

1 November 2023; 19:30	Report	Cuba	13–9	Chile	Aquatic Center, Santiago; Referees: Jorge Rincon Patiño (COL); Yuri Machado (BRA)
1 November 2023; 19:30	Report	Score by quarters: 2–2, 3–4, 4–1, 4–1			Aquatic Center, Santiago; Referees: Jorge Rincon Patiño (COL); Yuri Machado (BRA)
1 November 2023; 19:30	Report	Ponsa 5	Goals	Cárcamo 4	Aquatic Center, Santiago; Referees: Jorge Rincon Patiño (COL); Yuri Machado (BRA)

Quarterfinal

2 November 2023; 18:00	Report	United States	28–2	Chile	Aquatic Center, Santiago; Referees: Agustin Pinski (ARG); Teodoro de Brito (BRA)
2 November 2023; 18:00	Report	Score by quarters: 4–0, 9–0, 4–1, 11–1			Aquatic Center, Santiago; Referees: Agustin Pinski (ARG); Teodoro de Brito (BRA)
2 November 2023; 18:00	Report	R. Dodd 8	Goals	Illino, Reginato 1	Aquatic Center, Santiago; Referees: Agustin Pinski (ARG); Teodoro de Brito (BRA)

5th–8th place semifinals

3 November 2023; 16:30	Report	Puerto Rico	16–6	Chile	Aquatic Center, Santiago; Referees: Jose Garcia Soto (VEN); Fernando de Brito (BRA)
3 November 2023; 16:30	Report	Score by quarters: 6–1, 6–2, 3–0, 1–3			Aquatic Center, Santiago; Referees: Jose Garcia Soto (VEN); Fernando de Brito (BRA)

Seventh place game

4 November 2023; 16:00	Report	Cuba	12–11 (PSO)	Chile	Aquatic Center, Santiago; Referees: Yuri Machado (BRA); Reynel Castillo Torres (PUR)
4 November 2023; 16:00	Report	Score by quarters: 1–2, 0–2, 3–2, 3–1 PSO: 5–4			Aquatic Center, Santiago; Referees: Yuri Machado (BRA); Reynel Castillo Torres (PUR)

=== Women's tournament ===
Chile qualified a women's team (of 12 athletes) as hosts.

Preliminary round

Pos	Team	Pld	W	PSW	PSL	L	GF	GA	GD	Pts	Qualification
1	United States	3	3	0	0	0	89	3	+86	9	Quarterfinals
2	Brazil	3	2	0	0	1	53	34	+19	6	Quarterfinals
3	Puerto Rico	3	1	0	0	2	21	60	−39	3	Quarterfinals
4	Chile (H)	3	0	0	0	3	14	80	−66	0	Quarterfinals

Source: Santiago 2023
Rules for classification: 1) points; 2) head-to-head points; 3) head-to-head goal difference; 4) head-to-head number of goals scored; 5) goal difference.
(H) Host

30 October 2023; 12:30	Report	United States	35–0	Chile	Aquatic Center, Santiago; Referees: Jorge Rincon Patiño (COL); Ernesto Hernández Toledo (CUB)
30 October 2023; 12:30	Report	Score by quarters: 12–0, 8–0, 8–0, 7–0			Aquatic Center, Santiago; Referees: Jorge Rincon Patiño (COL); Ernesto Hernández Toledo (CUB)
30 October 2023; 12:30	Report	Flynn, Steffens 5	Goals		Aquatic Center, Santiago; Referees: Jorge Rincon Patiño (COL); Ernesto Hernández Toledo (CUB)

31 October 2023; 12:30	Report	Brazil	31–2	Chile	Aquatic Center, Santiago; Referees: Mikhail Dykman (CAN); Agustin Pinski (ARG)
31 October 2023; 12:30	Report	Score by quarters: 10–0, 10–0, 3–2, 8–0			Aquatic Center, Santiago; Referees: Mikhail Dykman (CAN); Agustin Pinski (ARG)
31 October 2023; 12:30	Report	Leão 6	Goals	Puelma, Ravizza 1	Aquatic Center, Santiago; Referees: Mikhail Dykman (CAN); Agustin Pinski (ARG)

1 November 2023; 12:30	Report	Puerto Rico	14–12	Chile	Aquatic Center, Santiago; Referees: Ernesto Hernández Toledo (CUB); Jorge Pinski (ARG)
1 November 2023; 12:30	Report	Score by quarters: 4–4, 3–2, 4–4, 3–2			Aquatic Center, Santiago; Referees: Ernesto Hernández Toledo (CUB); Jorge Pinski (ARG)
1 November 2023; 12:30	Report	Guzmán 4	Goals	Sarmiento 4	Aquatic Center, Santiago; Referees: Ernesto Hernández Toledo (CUB); Jorge Pinski (ARG)

Quarterfinal

2 November 2023; 11:00	Report	Canada	33–2	Chile	Aquatic Center, Santiago; Referees: Gerardo Arellano Jr (MEX); Jorge Rincon Patiño (COL)
2 November 2023; 11:00	Report	Score by quarters: 4–0, 9–0, 10–2, 10–0			Aquatic Center, Santiago; Referees: Gerardo Arellano Jr (MEX); Jorge Rincon Patiño (COL)
2 November 2023; 11:00	Report	Bakoc 7	Goals	I. del Villar, S. del Villar 1	Aquatic Center, Santiago; Referees: Gerardo Arellano Jr (MEX); Jorge Rincon Patiño (COL)

5th–8th place semifinals

3 November 2023; 9:30	Report	Cuba	15–13	Chile	Aquatic Center, Santiago; Referees: Jorge Rincon Patiño (COL); Yuri Machado (BRA)
3 November 2023; 9:30	Report	Score by quarters: 4–2, 5–3, 4–3, 2–5			Aquatic Center, Santiago; Referees: Jorge Rincon Patiño (COL); Yuri Machado (BRA)
3 November 2023; 9:30	Report	three players 3	Goals	S. del Villar, Sarmiento 5	Aquatic Center, Santiago; Referees: Jorge Rincon Patiño (COL); Yuri Machado (BRA)

Seventh place game

4 November 2023; 8:00	Report	Puerto Rico	18–13	Chile	Aquatic Center, Santiago; Referees: Daniel Federico Danes (URU); Jorge Agustin Pinski
4 November 2023; 8:00	Report	Score by quarters: 7–4, 3–3, 2–2, 6–4			Aquatic Center, Santiago; Referees: Daniel Federico Danes (URU); Jorge Agustin Pinski
4 November 2023; 8:00	Report	Guzmán 5	Goals	Henríquez 4	Aquatic Center, Santiago; Referees: Daniel Federico Danes (URU); Jorge Agustin Pinski

== Water skiing ==
Chile qualified two wakeboarders (one of each gender) as hosts.

Chile also qualified four water skiers as hosts.

Men

Athlete	Event	Preliminary					Final				
Athlete	Event	Slalom	Jump	Tricks	Total	Rank	Slalom	Jump	Tricks	Total	Rank
Martín Labra	Slalom	4.00/58/11.25	—N/a			8 Q	1.50/58/10.25	—N/a			6
Martín Labra	Jump	—N/a	59.3	—N/a		4 Q	—N/a	61.3	—N/a		4
Martín Labra	Tricks	—N/a		12060	—N/a	2 Q	—N/a		10120	—N/a	4
Martín Labra	Overall	821.43	886.30	1000.00	2,707.73	1 Q	855.77	963.64	852.42	2671.83	3rd place, bronze medalist(s)
Matías González	Slalom	1.50/58/11.25	—N/a			14	Did no advance	—N/a			Did not advance
Matías González	Tricks	—N/a		12060	—N/a	2 Q	—N/a		10170	—N/a	3rd place, bronze medalist(s)
Matías González	Overall	776.79	0.00	980.93	1,757.72	5 Q	605.77	975.45	0.00	1581.22	5
Emile Ritter	Jump	—N/a	62.8	—N/a		3 Q	—N/a	64.7	—N/a		1st place, gold medalist(s)

Women

Athlete	Event	Preliminary					Final				
Athlete	Event	Slalom	Jump	Tricks	Total	Rank	Slalom	Jump	Tricks	Total	Rank
Agustina Varas	Slalom	4.50/55/13.00	—N/a			9	Did not advance	—N/a			Did not advance
Agustina Varas	Jump	—N/a	49.2	—N/a		2 Q	—N/a	50.2	—N/a		2nd place, silver medalist(s)
Agustina Varas	Tricks	—N/a		2720	—N/a	11	—N/a		Did not advance	—N/a	Did not advance
Agustina Varas	Overall	627.27	993.83	256.85	1,877.95	4 Q	540.82	276.42	863.50	1680.74	4

Wakeboard

Athlete	Event	Qualification		Last Chance Qualifier		Final	
Athlete	Event	Score	Rank	Score	Rank	Score	Rank
Maximiliano Barberis	Men's	60.56	4	71.67	3	Did not advance	
Ignacia Holscher	Women's	73.33	2 Q	Bye		64.89	3rd place, bronze medalist(s)

== Weightlifting ==
Chile qualified a team of 8 weightlifters (4 men and 4 women) as hosts.

Men

Athlete	Event	Snatch		Clean & jerk		Total	
Athlete	Event	Weight	Rank	Weight	Rank	Weight	Rank
Aldair Castro	–61 kg	116	7	144	8	260	8
Sergio Valdés	–73 kg	132	7	162	8	294	7
Arley Méndez	–89 kg	160	4	196	4	356	5
Nicolás Cuevas	–102 kg	146	11	177	11	323	11

Women

Athlete	Event	Snatch		Clean & jerk		Total	
Athlete	Event	Weight	Rank	Weight	Rank	Weight	Rank
Katherine Landeros	–49 kg	70	6	89	7	159	6
Karina Torres	–71 kg	86	11	110	=10	196	11
María Fernanda Valdés	–81 kg	100	8	125	9	225	9
Arantzazu Miranda	+81 kg	105	6	128	7	233	7

== Wrestling ==
Chile qualified a full team of 18 wrestlers (12 men and 6 women) as hosts.

Key:

- VT (ranking points: 5–0 or 0–5) – Victory by fall.
- VB (ranking points: 5–0 or 0–5) – Victory by injury (VF for forfeit, VA for withdrawal or disqualification)
- PP (ranking points: 3–1 or 1–3) – Decision by points – the loser with technical points.
- PO (ranking points: 3–0 or 0–3) – Decision by points – the loser without technical points.
- ST (ranking points: 4–0 or 0–4) – Great superiority – the loser without technical points and a margin of victory of at least 8 (Greco-Roman) or 10 (freestyle) points.
- SP (ranking points: 4–1 or 1–4) – Technical superiority – the loser with technical points and a margin of victory of at least 8 (Greco-Roman) or 10 (freestyle) points.

Men

Athlete	Event	Round of 16	Quarterfinal	Semifinal	Repechage	Final / BM	
Athlete	Event	Opposition Result	Opposition Result	Opposition Result	Opposition Result	Opposition Result	Rank
André Quispe	Freestyle 65 kg	Bye	Garrett (USA); L 0–4ST	Did not advance	Auccapiña (PER); L 0–4ST	Did not advance	
León Peralta	Freestyle 74 kg	Barrios (HON); L 0–4ST	Did not advance				
Eduardo Gajardo	Freestyle 86 kg	Bye	Ceballos (VEN); L 1–4^{SP}	Did not advance			
Matías Uribe	Freestyle 97 kg	Bye	Silot (CUB); L 0–4ST	Did not advance	—N/a	Bronze medal match Sarco (VEN); L 0–4ST	=5
Diego Almendras	Freestyle 125 kg	—N/a	Johnson (JAM); L 0–5^{VF}	Did not advance			
Cristóbal Torres	Greco-Roman 60 kg	Bye	De Armas (CUB); L 0–4ST	Did not advance	—N/a	Bronze medal match Rodríguez (VEN); L 1–3^{PP}	=5
Néstor Almanza	Greco-Roman 67 kg	Ferreira (BRA); W 3–1^{PP}	Cabrera (PAR); W 4–0ST	Orta (CUB); L 0–4ST	—N/a	Bronze medal match Montaño (ECU); L 1–3^{PP}	=5
Eduardo Bernal	Greco-Roman 77 kg	Bye	Maynard (BAR); W 4–0ST	Bey (USA); L 0–4ST	Bye	Bronze medal match Peña (CUB); L 0–4ST	=5
José Moreno	Greco-Roman 87 kg	Bye	Grégorich (CUB); L 0–4ST	Did not advance	—N/a	Bronze medal match Batista (DOM); W 3–1^{PP}	3rd place, bronze medalist(s)
Yasmani Acosta	Greco-Roman 130 kg	Bye	Pino (CUB); L 1–3^{PP}	Did not advance	—N/a	Bronze medal match Soghomonyan (BRA); W 4–0ST	3rd place, bronze medalist(s)

Women

Athlete	Event	Round of 16	Quarterfinal	Semifinal	Repechage	Final / BM	
Athlete	Event	Opposition Result	Opposition Result	Opposition Result	Opposition Result	Opposition Result	Rank
Antonia Valdés	Freestyle 53 kg	Bye	Caballero (PAN); W 5–0^{VT}	Yépez (ECU); L 1–4^{SP}	—N/a	Bronze medal match Mallqui (PER); W 3–1^{PP}	3rd place, bronze medalist(s)
Dafne Palacios	Freestyle 57 kg	Bye	Sarco (VEN); L 0–5^{VT}	Did not advance			
Javiera Roco	Freestyle 62 kg	—N/a	Santana (CUB); L 0–4ST	Did not advance	—N/a	Bronze medal match Rentería (COL); L 0–4ST	=5
Virginia Jiménez	Freestyle 68 kg	Bye	Molinari (USA); L 0–4ST	Did not advance	Chávez (HON); W 3–0^{PO}	Bronze medal match Parrado (COL); L 0–5^{VT}	=5

== See also ==
- Chile at the 2023 Parapan American Games
- Chile at the 2024 Summer Olympics
