= Athletics at the 2023 Pan American Games – Men's 110 metres hurdles =

Men's 110 metres hurdles at the 2023 Pan American Games
- Venue: Julio Martínez National Stadium
- Dates: October 30 – November 2
- Competitors: 7 from 5 nations
- Winning time: 13.67

Medalists
Gold medal	Eduardo de Deus	Brazil
Silver medal	De'vion Wilson	United States
Bronze medal	Rafael Pereira	Brazil

The men's 110 metres hurdles competition of the athletics events at the 2023 Pan American Games was held on November 1 at the Julio Martínez National Stadium of Santiago, Chile.

== Records ==
Prior to this competition, the existing world and Pan American Games records were as follows:

World record	Aries Merritt (USA)	12.80	Brussels, Belgium	September 7, 2012
Pan American Games record	David Oliver (USA)	13.07	Toronto, Canada	July 24, 2015

== Schedule ==
Date	Time	Round
November 1, 2023	20:03	Final

== Results ==
=== Final ===
The results were as follows:

Rank	Lane	Name	Nationality	Time	Notes
1st place, gold medalist(s)	6	Eduardo de Deus	Brazil	13.67	
2nd place, silver medalist(s)	3	De'vion Wilson	United States	13.78	
3rd place, bronze medalist(s)	4	Rafael Pereira	Brazil	14.04	
4	2	Martín Sáenz	Chile	14.05	
5	7	Rasheem Brown	Cayman Islands	14.11	
6	5	Dylan Beard	United States	14.15	
7	8	Marcos Herrera	Ecuador	14.29	
				Wind: -0.5 m/s	
