= Football at the 2023 Pan American Games =

- Football pictogram
- Venues: Estadio Sausalito; Estadio Elías Figueroa Brander
- Start date: October 22, 2023
- End date: November 4, 2023
- No. of events: 2 (1 men, 1 women)
- Competitors: 288 from 13 nations

The Football competitions at the 2023 Pan American Games took place between October 27 and November 4, 2023 at the Estadio Sausalito in Viña del Mar and Estadio Elías Figueroa Brander in Valparaíso.

The Men's tournament was an under-23 competition, while the Women's tournament had no age restrictions.

== Qualification ==
A total of eight men's teams and eight women's teams qualified to compete at the games in each tournament. The host nation (Chile) qualified in each tournament, along with seven other teams in each tournament according to various qualifying criteria.

=== Summary ===
Nation	Men's	Women's	Athletes
Argentina		Yes	18
Bolivia		Yes	18
Brazil	Yes		18
Chile	Yes	Yes	36
Colombia	Yes		18
Costa Rica		Yes	18
Dominican Republic	Yes		18
Honduras	Yes		18
Jamaica		Yes	18
Mexico	Yes	Yes	36
Paraguay		Yes	18
United States	Yes	Yes	36
Uruguay	Yes		18
Total: 13 NOCs	8	8	288

=== Men ===
Event		Dates	Location	Quota(s)	Qualified
Host nation		—N/a	—N/a	1	Chile
2022 CONCACAF U-20 Championship	Champions	June 18 − July 3	Honduras	1	United States
2022 CONCACAF U-20 Championship	Top Caribbean team	June 18 − July 3	Honduras	1	Dominican Republic
2022 CONCACAF U-20 Championship	Top Central American team	June 18 − July 3	Honduras	1	Honduras
2022 CONCACAF U-20 Championship	Top North American team	June 18 − July 3	Honduras	1	Mexico
2023 South American U-20 Championship		19 January – 12 February	Colombia	3	Brazil; Uruguay; Colombia
Total				8	

=== Women ===
Event		Dates	Location	Quota(s)	Qualified
Host nation		—N/a	—N/a	1	Chile
2022 CONCACAF W Championship	Champions	July 4−18	Mexico	1	United States U19
2022 CONCACAF W Championship	Top Caribbean team	July 4−18	Mexico	1	Jamaica
2022 CONCACAF W Championship	Top Central American team	July 4−18	Mexico	1	Costa Rica
2022 CONCACAF W Championship	Top North American team	July 4−18	Mexico	1	~~Canada~~; Mexico^{[a]}
2022 Copa América Femenina	3rd to 5th place	July 8−30	Colombia	3	Argentina; Paraguay; ~~Venezuela~~^{[b]} Bolivia^{[c]}
Total				8	

^{[a]} Mexico replaced Canada after the latter withdrew citing scheduling issues.
^{b} Host nation Chile finished fifth, meaning sixth place Venezuela also qualified.
^{c} Bolivia replaced Venezuela after the latter withdrew.

== Venues ==
Viña del Mar	Valparaíso
Estadio Sausalito	Estadio Elías Figueroa Brander
Capacity: 23,423	Capacity: 20,575
Football at the 2023 Pan American Games is located in Chile

== Medal summary ==
=== Medal table ===
* Host nation (Chile)

Rank	Nation	Gold	Silver	Bronze	Total
1	Mexico	1	0	1	2
2	Brazil	1	0	0	1
3	Chile*	0	2	0	2
4	United States	0	0	1	1
Totals (4 entries)		2	2	2	6

=== Medalists ===
Event	Gold	Silver	Bronze
Men's tournament	Brazil Mycael; Andrew; Matheus Donelli; Miranda; Michel; Thauan Lara; Gustavo Martins; Arthur Chaves; Patryck Lanza; Ronald; Matheus Dias; Guilherme Biro; Igor Jesus; Marquinhos; Gabriel Pirani; Matheus Nascimento; Figueiredo; Kaio César; HC: Ramon Menezes	Chile Brayan Cortés; Tomás Ahumada; Jonathan Villagra; Bruno Gutiérrez; Daniel Gutiérrez; Matías Zaldivia; Antonio Díaz; Felipe Loyola; Vicente Pizarro; César Fuentes; Lucas Assadi; César Pérez; Alfred Canales; Maximiliano Guerrero; Alexander Aravena; Clemente Montes; Julián Alfaro; Damián Pizarro; HC: Eduardo Berizzo	Mexico Fernando Tapia; Eduardo García; Pablo Monroy; Emilio Lara; Rafael Fernández; Mauricio Isais; Jesús Garza; Tony Leone; Érik Lira; Raymundo Fulgencio; Fidel Ambríz; Jordan Carrillo; Bryan González; Sebastián Pérez Bouquet; Ramiro Árciga; Ettson Ayón; Jesús Brígido; Alí Ávila; HC: Ricardo Cadena
Women's tournament	Mexico Esthefanny Barreras; Rebeca Bernal; Scarlett Camberos; Alicia Cervantes; Charlyn Corral; Alexia Delgado; Greta Espinoza; Alejandría Godínez; Nicolette Hernández; Karla Nieto; Diana Ordóñez; Jacqueline Ovalle; Kiana Palacios; Anika Rodríguez; Karina Rodríguez; Kimberly Rodríguez; María Sánchez; Araceli Torres; HC: Pedro López	Chile Yenny Acuña; Yanara Aedo; Anaís Álvarez; Karen Araya; Antonia Canales; Franchesca Caniguán; Christiane Endler; Karen Fuentes; Su Helen Galaz; Yastin Jiménez; Yessenia López; Michelle Olivares; Isidora Olave; Fernanda Pinilla; Fernanda Ramírez; Camila Sáez; María José Urrutia; Daniela Zamora; HC: Luis Mena	United States Emeri Adames; Aven Alvarez; Lizzie Boamah; Kendall Bodak; Jordyn Bugg; Katie Shea Collins; Nicki Fraser; Claire Hutton; Sonoma Kasica; Eleanor Klinger; Charlotte Kohler; Lauren Martinho; Ava McDonald; Grace Restovich; Sam Smith; Gisele Thompson; Kealey Titmuss; Amalia Villarreal; HC: Carrie Kveton

== See also ==
- Football 5-a-side at the 2023 Parapan American Games
- Football 7-a-side at the 2023 Parapan American Games
- Football at the 2024 Summer Olympics
