= 2023 in American soccer =

Soccer in the United States
- Season: 2023

Men's soccer
- Supporters' Shield: FC Cincinnati
- USL Championship: Phoenix Rising FC
- USL League One: North Carolina FC
- NISA: Flower City Union
- MLS Next Pro: Austin FC II
- NPSL: Tulsa Athletic
- USL League Two: Ballard FC
- US Open Cup: Houston Dynamo FC
- MLS Cup: Columbus Crew

Women's soccer
- NWSL: NJ/NY Gotham FC
- NWSL Shield: San Diego Wave FC
- WPSL: Charlotte Eagles
- UWS: Michigan Jaguars FC
- NWSL Challenge Cup: North Carolina Courage

The 2023 season was the 111th year of organized competitive soccer in the United States. The season began with friendlies for the men's national team (USMNT) and women's national team (USWNT) in January.

== National teams ==
=== Men's ===
==== Senior ====
As of November 20, 2023.

Wins	Losses	Draws
10	3	5

===== Friendlies =====
January 25	United States	1–2	Serbia	Los Angeles, California
22:00 ET	Vazquez 29'	Report	Ilić 43'; Simić 46'	Stadium: BMO Stadium; Attendance: 11,475; Referee: Daneon Parchment (Jamaica)

January 28	United States	0–0	Colombia	Carson, California
19:30 ET		Report		Stadium: Dignity Health Sports Park; Attendance: 27,000; Referee: Saíd Martínez (Honduras)

September 9	United States	3–0	Uzbekistan	St. Louis, Missouri
17:30 ET	Weah 4'; Pepi 90+1'; Pulisic 90+5' (pen.)	Report		Stadium: CityPark; Attendance: 15,569; Referee: Nelson Salgado (Honduras)

September 12	United States	4–0	Oman	Saint Paul, Minnesota
20:30 ET	Balogun 13'; Aaronson 60'; Pepi 79'; Al-Braiki 81' (o.g.)	Report		Stadium: Allianz Field; Attendance: 13,665; Referee: Mario Escobar (Guatemala)

October 14	United States	1–3	Germany	East Hartford, Connecticut
15:00 ET	Pulisic 27'	Report	Gündoğan 39'; Füllkrug 58'; Musiala 61'	Stadium: Pratt & Whitney Stadium; Attendance: 37,743; Referee: Fernando Guerrero (Mexico)

October 17	United States	4–0	Ghana	Nashville, Tennessee
20:30 ET	Reyna 10', 39'; Pulisic 19' (pen.); Balogun 22'	Report		Stadium: Geodis Park; Attendance: 18,468; Referee: Marco Ortiz (Mexico)

===== 2022–23 CONCACAF Nations League =====
====== Group D ======
Pos	Team	Pld	W	D	L	GF	GA	GD	Pts	Qualification	(United States)	(El Salvador)	(Grenada)
1	United States	4	3	1	0	14	2	+12	10	Qualification for Finals and Gold Cup	—	1–0	5–0
2	El Salvador	4	1	2	1	6	5	+1	5	Qualification for Gold Cup	1–1	—	3–1
3	Grenada	4	0	1	3	4	17	−13	1	Advance to Gold Cup prelims	1–7	2–2	—

Source: CONCACAF
Rules for classification: Tiebreakers

March 24	Grenada	1–7	United States	St. George's, Grenada
20:00 ET	Hippolyte 32'	Report	Pepi 4', 53'; Aaronson 20'; McKennie 31', 34'; Pulisic 49'; Zendejas 72'	Stadium: Kirani James Athletic Stadium; Attendance: 7,032; Referee: Daneon Parchment (Jamaica)

March 27	United States	1–0	El Salvador	Orlando, Florida
19:30 ET	Pepi 62'	Report		Stadium: Exploria Stadium; Attendance: 18,947; Referee: Mario Escobar (Guatemala)

====== Finals ======
June 15 SF	United States	3–0	Mexico	Paradise, Nevada
22:00 ET	Pulisic 37', 43'; Pepi 79'	Report		Stadium: Allegiant Stadium; Attendance: 65,000; Referee: Iván Barton (El Salvador)

June 18 F	Canada	0–2	United States	Paradise, Nevada
20:30 ET		Report	Richards 12'; Balogun 34'	Stadium: Allegiant Stadium; Attendance: 35,000; Referee: Saíd Martínez (Honduras)

===== 2023–24 CONCACAF Nations League =====
====== Knockout rounds ======
Team 1	Agg.	Team 2	1st leg	2nd leg
United States	4–2	Trinidad and Tobago	3–0	1–2

November 16 1st Leg QF	United States	3–0	Trinidad and Tobago	Austin, Texas
21:00 ET	Pepi 82'; Robinson 86'; Reyna 89'	Report		Stadium: Q2 Stadium; Attendance: 19,850; Referee: Oshane Nation (Jamaica)

November 20 2nd Leg QF	Trinidad and Tobago	2–1 (2–4 agg.)	United States	Port of Spain, Trinidad and Tobago
19:00 ET	Moore 43'; Jones 57'	Report	Robinson 25'	Stadium: Hasely Crawford Stadium; Referee: Walter López (Guatemala)
Note: United States won 4–2 on aggregate and qualified to the 2024 Copa América.

===== Continental Clásico =====
April 19	United States	1–1	Mexico	Glendale, Arizona
22:22 ET	Ferreira 81'	Report	Antuna 55'	Stadium: State Farm Stadium; Attendance: 55,730; Referee: Bryan López (Guatemala)

===== CONCACAF Gold Cup =====
====== Group A ======
Pos	Team	Pld	W	D	L	GF	GA	GD	Pts	Qualification
1	United States (H)	3	2	1	0	13	1	+12	7	Advance to knockout stage
2	Jamaica	3	2	1	0	10	2	+8	7	Advance to knockout stage
3	Trinidad and Tobago	3	1	0	2	4	10	−6	3	
4	Saint Kitts and Nevis	3	0	0	3	0	14	−14	0	

Source: CONCACAF
Rules for classification: Tiebreakers
(H) Co-host

June 24	United States	1–1	Jamaica	Chicago, Illinois
22:00 ET	Vázquez 88'	Report	Lowe 13'	Stadium: Soldier Field; Attendance: 36,666; Referee: César Arturo Ramos (Mexico)

June 28	Saint Kitts and Nevis	0–6	United States	St. Louis, Missouri
22:00 ET		Report	Mihailovic 12', 79'; Reynolds 14'; Ferreira 16', 25', 50'	Stadium: CityPark; Attendance: 21,216; Referee: Juan Gabriel Calderón (Costa Rica)

July 2	United States	6–0	Trinidad and Tobago	Charlotte, North Carolina
19:00 ET	Ferreira 14', 38', 45+3' (pen.); Cowell 65'; Busio 79'; Vázquez 90+4'	Report		Stadium: Bank of America Stadium; Attendance: 40,243; Referee: Mario Escobar (Guatemala)

====== Knock out ======
July 9 QF	United States	2–2 (a.e.t.) (3–2 p)	Canada	Cincinnati, Ohio
19:30 ET	Vázquez 88'; Kennedy 115' (o.g.)	Report	Vitória 90+3' (pen.); Shaffelburg 109'	Stadium: TQL Stadium; Attendance: 24,979; Referee: Marco Ortiz (Mexico)
	Penalties
	Vázquez (penalty missed); Cowell (penalty scored); Busio (penalty scored); Ferreira (penalty scored)		(penalty missed) Vitória; (penalty missed) Fraser; (penalty scored) Miller; (penalty scored) Russell-Rowe; (penalty missed) Brym

July 12 SF	United States	1–1 (a.e.t.) (4–5 p)	Panama	San Diego, California
19:30 ET	Ferreira 105'	Report	I. Anderson 99'	Stadium: Snapdragon Stadium; Attendance: 31,690; Referee: Walter López (Guatemala)
	Penalties
	Ferreira (penalty missed); Mihailovic (penalty scored); Morris (penalty scored); Gressel (penalty scored); Miazga (penalty scored); Roldan (penalty missed)		(penalty scored) Escobar; (penalty scored) Díaz; (penalty missed) Martínez; (penalty scored) Bárcenas; (penalty scored) Waterman; (penalty scored) Carrasquilla

===== Goalscorers =====
Goals are current as of November 20, 2023, after the match against Trinidad and Tobago.

Player	Goals
Jesús Ferreira	8
Ricardo Pepi	7
Christian Pulisic	6
Brandon Vazquez	4
Folarin Balogun	3
Giovanni Reyna	3
Brenden Aaronson	2
Weston McKennie	2
Djordje Mihailovic	2
Antonee Robinson	2
Gianluca Busio	1
Cade Cowell	1
Bryan Reynolds	1
Chris Richards	1
Timothy Weah	1
Alejandro Zendejas	1
own goal	2

==== U–23 ====
===== Friendlies =====
October 11	United States	2–1	Mexico	Phoenix, Arizona
10:00 ET	Bajraktarevic 45+1'; Vargas 90'	Report	Brigido 90+3'	Stadium: Phoenix Rising Soccer Stadium

October 17	United States	4–1	Japan	Phoenix, Arizona
10:30 ET	Gomez 5'; Aaronson 45'; Morris 57'; McGuire 73'	Report	Matsuki 35'	Stadium: Phoenix Rising Soccer Stadium

===== Pan American Games =====
====== Group B ======
Pos	Team	Pld	W	D	L	GF	GA	GD	Pts	Qualification
1	Brazil	3	3	0	0	6	0	+6	9	Advance to knockout stage
2	United States	3	2	0	1	4	2	+2	6	Advance to knockout stage
3	Colombia	3	1	0	2	2	4	−2	3	
4	Honduras	3	0	0	3	1	7	−6	0	

Source: Santiago2023

October 23	Brazil	1–0	United States	Viña del Mar, Chile
17:00 ET		Report	Miranda 86'	Stadium: Estadio Sausalito; Referee: José Matos Uzcategui (Venezuela)

October 26	United States	2–1	Honduras	Valparaíso, Chile
14:00 ET	Leyva 72'; Ku-DiPietro 90'	Report	García 19'	Stadium: Estadio Elías Figueroa Brander; Referee: Manuel Vergara (Chile)

October 29	Colombia	0–2	United States	Viña del Mar, Chile
17:00 ET		Report	Ikoba 63'; Neri 76'	Stadium: Estadio Sausalito; Referee: Fernando Véjar Diaz (Chile)

====== Knock out ======
November 1 SF	Chile	1–0	United States	Valparaíso, Chile
		Report		Stadium: Estadio Elías Figueroa Brander; Referee: Juan López (Paraguay)

November 4 3rd	United States	1–4	Mexico	Viña del Mar, Chile
	Ikoba 20'	Report	Carrillo 42', 78'; Fulgencio 50'; Ávila 88'	Stadium: Estadio Sausalito; Referee: Fernando Véjar Diaz (Chile)

==== U–20 ====
===== FIFA U-20 World Cup =====
====== Group B ======
Pos	Team	Pld	W	D	L	GF	GA	GD	Pts	Qualification
1	United States	3	3	0	0	6	0	+6	9	Knockout stage
2	Ecuador	3	2	0	1	11	2	+9	6	Knockout stage
3	Slovakia	3	1	0	2	5	4	+1	3	Knockout stage
4	Fiji	3	0	0	3	0	16	−16	0	

Source: FIFA
Rules for classification: Group stage tiebreakers

May 20	United States	1–0	Ecuador	San Juan, Argentina
	Gómez 90+3'	Report		Stadium: Estadio San Juan del Bicentenario; Attendance: 14,865; Referee: Salman Falahi (Qatar)

May 23	United States	3–0	Fiji	San Juan, Argentina
	Luna 66'; Cowell 88'; Wiley 90+9'	Report		Stadium: Estadio San Juan del Bicentenario; Attendance: 8,017; Referee: Mohamed Marouf (Egypt)

May 26	Slovakia	0–2	United States	San Juan, Argentina
		Report	Cowell 38'; Tsakiris 90+6'	Stadium: Estadio San Juan del Bicentenario; Attendance: 15,059; Referee: Ramon Abatti (Brazil)

====== Knockout Stage ======
May 30 R16	United States	4–0	New Zealand	Mendoza, Argentina
	Wolff 14'; Cowell 61'; Che 75'; Pukstas 82'	Report		Stadium: Estadio Malvinas Argentinas; Attendance: 7,848; Referee: Mohamed Marouf (Egypt)

June 4 QF	United States	0–2	Uruguay	Santiago del Estero, Argentina
		Report	Duarte 21'; Wynder 56' (o.g.)	Stadium: Estadio Único Madre de Ciudades; Attendance: 18,474; Referee: Serdar Gözübüyük (Netherlands)

==== U–17 ====
===== CONCACAF U-17 Championship =====
====== Group F ======
Pos	Team	Pld	W	D	L	GF	GA	GD	Pts	Qualification
1	United States	3	3	0	0	9	1	+8	9	Round of 16
2	Canada	3	2	0	1	5	3	+2	6	Round of 16
3	Trinidad and Tobago	3	0	1	2	4	7	−3	1	Round of 16
4	Barbados	3	0	1	2	1	8	−7	1	

Source: CONCACAF
Rules for classification: Tie-breakers

February 11	United States	5–0	Barbados	Antigua, Guatemala
	Medina 25', 43', 90+3'; Figueroa 86'; Habroune 89'	Report		Stadium: Estadio Pensativo; Referee: Okeito Nicholson (Jamaica)

February 13	Trinidad and Tobago	1–3	United States	Antigua, Guatemala
	Garcia 78'	Report	Burton 11'; Rudisill 14'; Habourne 24'	Stadium: Estadio Pensativo; Referee: Víctor Cáceres (Mexico)

February 15	United States	1–0	Canada	Antigua, Guatemala
	Figueroa 64'	Report		Stadium: Estadio Pensativo; Referee: Fernando Morón (Panama)

====== Knockout stage ======
February 18 R16	United States	7–0	Dominican Republic	Antigua, Guatemala
	Aquino 22', 30'; Figueroa 45+2', 57'; Burton 62'; Soto 83', 90'	Report	Reyes (yellow card) 26'; Mena (yellow card) 38'; Cruz (yellow card) 44'; Peña (yellow card) 79'	Stadium: Estadio Pensativo; Referee: Daniel Quintero (Mexico)

February 21 QF	Guatemala	3–5	United States	Guatemala City, Guatemala
	Illescas (yellow card) 38'; Escobar 45' (pen.); Vásquez 52'; Aguilar 74'	Report	Romero 7'; Figueroa 28', 53'; Harangi 51'; Díaz (yellow card) 73'; Habroune 83'; Ferree (yellow card) 88'; Burton (yellow card) 90'	Stadium: Estadio Doroteo Guamuch Flores; Referee: Víctor Cáceres (Mexico)

February 24 SF	Canada	0–2	United States	Guatemala City, Guatemala
		Report	Burton 36'; Figueroa 90+4'	Stadium: Estadio Doroteo Guamuch Flores; Referee: Christopher Mason (Jamaica)

February 26 F	Mexico	3–1	United States	Guatemala City, Guatemala
	Carrillo 10'; Navarrete 51'; Martínez 90+2'	Report	Soma 69'	Stadium: Estadio Doroteo Guamuch Flores; Referee: Filiberto Martínez (El Salvador)

===== FIFA U-17 World Cup =====
====== Group E ======
Pos	Team	Pld	W	D	L	GF	GA	GD	Pts	Qualification
1	France	3	3	0	0	7	0	+7	9	Knockout stage
2	United States	3	2	0	1	5	5	0	6	Knockout stage
3	Burkina Faso	3	1	0	2	3	6	−3	3	
4	South Korea	3	0	0	3	2	6	−4	0	

Source: FIFA

November 12	South Korea	1–3	United States	Jakarta, Indonesia
07:00 ET	Kim Myeong-jun 35'	Report	Berchimas 7', 73'; Medina 49'	Stadium: Jakarta International Stadium; Attendance: 4,317; Referee: Morten Krogh (Denmark)

November 15	United States	2–1	Burkina Faso	Jakarta, Indonesia
07:00 ET	Figueroa 45'; Berchimas 45+6'	Report	Diarra 89'	Stadium: Jakarta International Stadium; Attendance: 3,235; Referee: Roberto Pérez (Peru)

November 18	United States	0–3	France	Jakarta, Indonesia
07:00 ET		Report	Tincres 45+2', 82'; Meupiyou 86'	Stadium: Jakarta International Stadium; Referee: Dahane Beida (Mauritania)

====== Knock-out ======
November 21 R16	Germany	3–2	United States	Bandung, Indonesia
	Herrmann 14'; Moerstedt 34'; Yalcinkaya 87'	Report	Habroune 24'; Vazquez 80'	Stadium: Si Jalak Harupat Stadium; Referee: Fu Ming (China)

==== U-15 ====
===== CONCACAF Boys' Under-15 Championship =====
====== Group B ======
Pos	Team	Pld	W	D	L	GF	GA	GD	Pts	Qualification
1	United States	3	3	0	0	17	2	+15	9	Advance to Quarter-finals
2	Haiti	3	2	0	1	4	4	0	6	Advance to Quarter-finals
3	Cuba	3	1	0	2	2	14	−12	3	Advance to Play-offs round
4	Qatar (G)	3	0	0	3	2	5	−3	0	Advance to Play-offs round

Source: CONCACAF
Rules for classification: Tiebreakers
(G) Guests

6 August 2023	United States	3–2	Qatar	Santo Domingo, Dominican Republic
20:00	Cavan Sullivan 3'; Chase Adams 19'; Julian Hall 38'	Report		Stadium: Estadio Panamericano

7 August 2023	Cuba	0–11	United States	Santo Domingo, Dominican Republic
18:00		Report	Jamir Johnson (x3); Tanner Rosborough (x2); Omar Marquez (x2); Luca Moisa (x2); Julian Hall; Cavan Sullivan	Stadium: Estadio Panamericano

8 August 2023	United States	3–0	Haiti	Santo Domingo, Dominican Republic
20:00	Jude Terry; Tanner Rosborough; Chase Adams	Report		Stadium: Estadio Panamericano

====== Knockout stage ======
10 August 2023 QF	United States	4–1	Guatemala	Santo Domingo, Dominican Republic
8:00 PM EST	Tortola; Sullivan pen.'; Sanders; Adams pen.'	Report	Ávila 50'	Stadium: Félix Sánchez Olympic Stadium

11 August 2023 SF	Haiti	0–1	United States	Santo Domingo, Dominican Republic
8:00 PM EST		Report	Chavez 41'	Stadium: Félix Sánchez Olympic Stadium

13 August 2023 F	Mexico	2–4	United States	Santo Domingo, Dominican Republic
8:00 PM EST		Report	Adams, Johnson Hall	Stadium: Félix Sánchez Olympic Stadium

=== Women's ===
==== Senior ====
As of December 31, 2023.

Wins	Losses	Draws
14	0	4

===== Friendlies =====
January 17	New Zealand	0–4	United States	Wellington, New Zealand
22:00 ET		Report	Swanson 52', 63'; Morgan 60'; Williams 74'	Stadium: Sky Stadium; Attendance: 12,508; Referee: Kate Jacewicz (Australia)

January 20	New Zealand	0–5	United States	Auckland, New Zealand
22:00 ET		Report	Hatch 22'; Lavelle 39', 74'; Swanson 53'; Kornieck 80'	Stadium: Eden Park; Attendance: 12,721; Referee: Lara Lee (Australia)

April 8	United States	2–0	Republic of Ireland	Austin, Texas
14:30 ET	Fox 37'; Horan 80' (pen.)	Report		Stadium: Q2 Stadium

April 11	United States	1–0	Republic of Ireland	St. Louis, Missouri
19:30 ET	Cook 43'	Report		Stadium: Citypark; Attendance: 22,294; Referee: Crystal Sobers (Trinidad and Tobago)

July 9	United States	2–0	Wales	San Jose, California
16:00 ET	Rodman 76', 87'	Report		Stadium: PayPal Park; Attendance: 18,000; Referee: Karen Hernandez (Mexico)

September 21	United States	3–0	South Africa	Cincinnati, Ohio
19:30 ET	Williams 32', 41'; Rodman 34'	Report		Stadium: TQL Stadium; Referee: Katia Garcia (Mexico)

September 24	United States	2–0	South Africa	Chicago, Illinois
17:30 ET	Rodman 18'; Sonnett 49'	Report		Stadium: Soldier Field; Attendance: 25,622; Referee: Carly Shaw-MacLaren (Canada)

October 26	United States	0–0	Colombia	Sandy, Utah
21:00 ET		Report		Stadium: America First Field; Attendance: 13,058; Referee: Melissa Borjas (Honduras)

October 29	United States	3–0	Colombia	San Diego, California
17:30 ET	Fishel 56'; Horan 62'; Shaw 83'	Report		Stadium: Snapdragon Stadium; Attendance: 16,202; Referee: Odette Hamilton (Jamaica)

December 2	United States	3–0	China	Fort Lauderdale, Florida
18:00 ET	Smith 8'; Horan 52'; Rodman 77'	Report		Stadium: DRV PNK Stadium; Attendance: 8,768; Referee: Marie-Soleil Beaudoin (Canada)

December 5	United States	2–1	China	Frisco, Texas
20:00 ET	Coffey 62'; Shaw 79'	Report	Shen 45+1'	Stadium: Toyota Stadium; Attendance: 11,024; Referee: Lizzet Garcia (Mexico)

===== SheBelieves Cup =====
Pos	Team	Pld	W	D	L	GF	GA	GD	Pts
1st place, gold medalist(s)	United States (H, C)	3	3	0	0	5	1	+4	9
2nd place, silver medalist(s)	Japan	3	1	0	2	3	2	+1	3
3rd place, bronze medalist(s)	Brazil	3	1	0	2	2	4	−2	3
4	Canada	3	1	0	2	2	5	−3	3

Source: Soccerway
Rules for classification: 1) points; 2) goal difference; 3) goals scored; 4) head-to-head result; 5) fair play ranking.
(C) Champions; (H) Hosts

February 16	United States	2–0	Canada	Orlando, Florida
19:00 ET	Swanson 7', 34'	Report		Stadium: Exploria Stadium; Attendance: 14,697; Referee: Katia Garcia (Mexico)

February 19	United States	1–0	Japan	Nashville, Tennessee
15:30 ET	Swanson 45'	Report		Stadium: Geodis Park; Attendance: 25,471; Referee: Myriam Marcotte (Canada)

February 22	United States	2–1	Brazil	Frisco, Texas
19:00 ET	Morgan 45+2'; Swanson 63'	Report	Ludmila 90'	Stadium: Toyota Stadium; Attendance: 17,784; Referee: Marie-Soleil Beaudoin (Canada)

===== 2023 FIFA Women's World Cup =====
====== Group E ======
Pos	Team	Pld	W	D	L	GF	GA	GD	Pts	Qualification
1	Netherlands	3	2	1	0	9	1	+8	7	Advance to knockout stage
2	United States	3	1	2	0	4	1	+3	5	Advance to knockout stage
3	Portugal	3	1	1	1	2	1	+1	4	
4	Vietnam	3	0	0	3	0	12	−12	0	

Source: FIFA

July 21	United States	3–0	Vietnam	Auckland, New Zealand
21:00 ET	Smith 14', 45+7'; Horan 77'	Report		Stadium: Eden Park; Attendance: 41,107; Referee: Bouchra Karboubi (Morocco)

July 26	United States	1–1	Netherlands	Wellington, New Zealand
21:00 ET	Horan 62'	Report	Roord 17'	Stadium: Wellington Regional Stadium; Attendance: 40,958; Referee: Yoshimi Yamashita (Japan)

August 1	Portugal	0–0	United States	Auckland, New Zealand
3:00 ET		Report		Stadium: Eden Park; Attendance: 27,312; Referee: Rebecca Welch (England)

====== Knockout stage ======
August 6 R16	Sweden	0–0 (a.e.t.) (5–4 p)	United States	Melbourne, Australia
5:00 ET		Report		Stadium: Melbourne Rectangular Stadium; Attendance: 27,706; Referee: Stéphanie Frappart (France)
	Penalties
	Rolfö (penalty scored); Rubensson (penalty scored); Björn (penalty missed); Blomqvist (penalty missed); Bennison (penalty scored); Eriksson (penalty scored); Hurtig (penalty scored)		(penalty scored) Sullivan; (penalty scored) Horan; (penalty scored) Mewis; (penalty missed) Rapinoe; (penalty missed) Smith; (penalty scored) Naeher; (penalty missed) O'Hara

===== Goalscorers =====
Goals are current as of December 5, 2023, after the match against China.

Player	Goals
Mallory Swanson	7
Lindsey Horan	5
Trinity Rodman	5
Lynn Williams	3
Sophia Smith	3
Rose Lavelle	2
Alex Morgan	2
Jaedyn Shaw	2
Sam Coffey	1
Alana Cook	1
Mia Fishel	1
Emily Fox	1
Ashley Hatch	1
Taylor Kornieck	1
Emily Sonnett	1
Total	36

==== U–20 ====
===== CONCACAF Women's U-20 Championship =====
====== Group A ======
Pos	Team	Pld	W	D	L	GF	GA	GD	Pts	Qualification
1	United States	3	3	0	0	15	2	+13	9	Knockout stage
2	Canada	3	2	0	1	11	5	+6	6	Knockout stage
3	Jamaica	3	1	0	2	4	9	−5	3	
4	Panama	3	0	0	3	1	15	−14	0	

Source: CONCACAF
Rules for classification: Group stage tiebreakers

May 26	United States	6–0	Panama	Santo Domingo, Dominican Republic
	Dudley 1'; Sentnor 41' (pen.), 49' (pen.); Rader 45'; Martinho 64'; Lemos 71' (pen.)	Report		Stadium: Félix Sánchez Olympic Stadium; Referee: Katia García (Mexico)

May 28	Jamaica	0–4	United States	Santo Domingo, Dominican Republic
		Report	Dahlien 11', 47', 79'; Dellarose 49'	Stadium: Félix Sánchez Olympic Stadium; Referee: Astrid Gramajo (Guatemala)

May 30	United States	5–2	Canada	Santo Domingo, Dominican Republic
	Dahlien 3'; Sentnor 11', 55'; Thompson 45+3' (pen.); Gamero 61'	Report	Allen 54' (pen.); Rose 67'	Stadium: Félix Sánchez Olympic Stadium; Referee: Katia García (Mexico)

====== Knockout stage ======
June 2 SF	United States	2–1	Costa Rica	Santo Domingo, Dominican Republic
	Aikey 39'; Martinho 49'	Report	Scott 55' (pen.)	Stadium: Félix Sánchez Olympic Stadium; Referee: Sandra Benítez (El Salvador)

June 4 F	Mexico	2–1	United States	Santo Domingo, Dominican Republic
	Orozco 71'; Servín 88'	Report	Gamero 80'	Stadium: Félix Sánchez Olympic Stadium; Referee: Marianela Araya (Costa Rica)

==== U–19 ====
===== Pan American Games =====
====== Group B ======
Pos	Team	Pld	W	D	L	GF	GA	GD	Pts	Qualification
1	United States	3	3	0	0	13	1	+12	9	Semi-finals
2	Argentina	3	1	1	1	3	4	−1	4	Semi-finals
3	Costa Rica	2	0	1	1	1	3	−2	1	Fifth place match
4	Bolivia	2	0	0	2	0	9	−9	0	Seventh place match

Source: Santiago2023
Rules for classification: Tie-breakers

October 22	United States	6–0	Bolivia	Viña del Mar, Chile
14:00 ET	McDonald 4', 22', 68'; Villarreal 19', 58'; Adames 33'	Report		Stadium: Estadio Sausalito; Referee: Stefani Escobar (Venezuela)

October 25	United States	3–1	Costa Rica	Valparaíso, Chile
12:00 ET	Collins 10'; Hutton 72'; Adames 76'	Report	Fonseca 34'	Stadium: Estadio Elías Figueroa Brander; Referee: Maria Belen Lupera Reto (Ecuador)

October 28	United States	4–0	Argentina	Viña del Mar, Chile
12:00 ET	Bodak 15'; Kohler 20'; Villarreal 50'; Restovich 54'	Report		Stadium: Estadio Sausalito; Referee: Andreza Helena De Siqueira (Brazil)

====== Knock out ======
October 31 Semi-finals	Chile	2–1	United States	Viña del Mar, Chile
18:00 ET	Araya 37'; Aedo 45'	Report	Adames 52'	Stadium: Estadio Sausalito; Referee: Andreza De Siqueira (Brazil)

November 3 Bronze Medal Match	Argentina	0–2	United States	Valparaíso, Chile
3:00 ET		Report	Villarreal 30'; Hutton 37'	Stadium: Estadio Elías Figueroa Brander; Referee: Stefani Escobar (Venezuela)

== Club competitions ==
=== Men's ===
==== League competitions ====
===== Major League Soccer =====
====== Conference tables ======
Eastern Conference

MLS Eastern Conference table (2023)
Pos	Team	Pld	W	L	T	GF	GA	GD	Pts	Qualification
1	FC Cincinnati	34	20	5	9	57	39	+18	69	Qualification for round one and the CONCACAF Champions Cup round one
2	Orlando City SC	34	18	7	9	55	39	+16	63	Qualification for round one
3	Columbus Crew	34	16	9	9	67	46	+21	57	Qualification for round one
4	Philadelphia Union	34	15	9	10	57	41	+16	55	Qualification for round one
5	New England Revolution	34	15	9	10	58	46	+12	55	Qualification for round one
6	Atlanta United FC	34	13	9	12	66	53	+13	51	Qualification for round one
7	Nashville SC	34	13	11	10	39	32	+7	49	Qualification for round one
8	New York Red Bulls	34	11	13	10	36	39	−3	43	Qualification for the wild-card round
9	Charlotte FC	34	10	11	13	45	52	−7	43	Qualification for the wild-card round
10	CF Montréal	34	12	17	5	36	52	−16	41	
11	New York City FC	34	9	11	14	35	39	−4	41	
12	D.C. United	34	10	14	10	45	49	−4	40	
13	Chicago Fire FC	34	10	14	10	39	51	−12	40	
14	Inter Miami CF	34	9	18	7	41	54	−13	34	
15	Toronto FC	34	4	20	10	26	59	−33	22	

Source: MLS
Rules for classification: 1) points; 2) total wins; 3) total goal differential; 4) total goals scored; 5) fewer disciplinary points; 6) away goal differential; 7) away goals scored; 8) home goals differential; 9) home goals scored; 10) coin toss (2 clubs tied) or drawing of lots (≥3 clubs tied)

Western Conference

MLS Western Conference table (2023)
Pos	Team	Pld	W	L	T	GF	GA	GD	Pts	Qualification
1	St. Louis City SC	34	17	12	5	62	45	+17	56	Qualification for round one and the CONCACAF Champions Cup Round One
2	Seattle Sounders FC	34	14	9	11	41	32	+9	53	Qualification for round one
3	Los Angeles FC	34	14	10	10	54	39	+15	52	Qualification for round one
4	Houston Dynamo FC	34	14	11	9	51	38	+13	51	Qualification for round one
5	Real Salt Lake	34	14	12	8	48	50	−2	50	Qualification for round one
6	Vancouver Whitecaps FC	34	12	10	12	55	48	+7	48	Qualification for round one
7	FC Dallas	34	11	10	13	41	37	+4	46	Qualification for round one
8	Sporting Kansas City	34	12	14	8	48	51	−3	44	Qualification for the wild-card round
9	San Jose Earthquakes	34	10	10	14	39	43	−4	44	Qualification for the wild-card round
10	Portland Timbers	34	11	13	10	46	58	−12	43	
11	Minnesota United FC	34	10	13	11	46	51	−5	41	
12	Austin FC	34	10	15	9	49	55	−6	39	
13	LA Galaxy	34	8	14	12	51	67	−16	36	
14	Colorado Rapids	34	5	17	12	26	54	−28	27	

Source: MLS
Rules for classification: 1) points; 2) total wins; 3) total goal differential; 4) total goals scored; 5) fewer disciplinary points; 6) away goal differential; 7) away goals scored; 8) home goals differential; 9) home goals scored; 10) coin toss (2 clubs tied) or drawing of lots (≥3 clubs tied)

====== Overall 2023 table ======
Note: the table below has no impact on playoff qualification and is used solely for determining host of the MLS Cup, certain CCL spots, the Supporters' Shield trophy, seeding in the 2024 Canadian Championship, and 2023 MLS draft. The conference tables are the sole determinant for teams qualifying for the playoffs.

Overall MLS standings table
Pos	Team	Pld	W	L	T	GF	GA	GD	Pts	Qualification
1	FC Cincinnati (S)	34	20	5	9	57	39	+18	69	Qualification for the CONCACAF Champions Cup Round One (Note: As 2023 MLS Supporters' Shield champions)
2	Orlando City SC	34	18	7	9	55	39	+16	63	Qualification for the CONCACAF Champions Cup Round One (Note: As highest-ranked club in 2023 MLS Supporters' Shield not already qualified)
3	Columbus Crew (C)	34	16	9	9	67	46	+21	57	Qualification for the CONCACAF Champions Cup Round of 16 (Note: As 2023 MLS Cup champions)
4	St. Louis City SC	34	17	12	5	62	45	+17	56	Qualification for the CONCACAF Champions Cup Round One (Note: As 2023 Western Conference regular season champions)
5	Philadelphia Union	34	15	9	10	57	41	+16	55	Qualification for the CONCACAF Champions Cup Round One (Note: As 2023 Leagues Cup third place)
6	New England Revolution	34	15	9	10	58	46	+12	55	Qualification for the CONCACAF Champions Cup Round One (Note: As second highest-ranked club in 2023 MLS Supporters' Shield not already qualified)
7	Seattle Sounders FC	34	14	9	11	41	32	+9	53	Qualification for the U.S. Open Cup Round of 32 (Note: As one of the top seven teams in the overall table to not qualify for the 2024 CONCACAF Champions Cup)
8	Los Angeles FC	34	14	10	10	54	39	+15	52	Qualification for the U.S. Open Cup Round of 32
9	Houston Dynamo FC (U)	34	14	11	9	51	38	+13	51	Qualification for the CONCACAF Champions Cup Round One and U.S. Open Cup Round of 32 (Note: Qualify for both the Champions Cup and U.S. Open Cup as 2023 U.S. Open Cup champions)
10	Atlanta United FC	34	13	9	12	66	53	+13	51	Qualification for the U.S. Open Cup Round of 32
11	Real Salt Lake	34	14	12	8	48	50	−2	50	Qualification for the U.S. Open Cup Round of 32
12	Nashville SC	34	13	11	10	39	32	+7	49	Qualification for the CONCACAF Champions Cup Round One (Note: As 2023 Leagues Cup runner-up)
13	Vancouver Whitecaps FC (V)	34	12	10	12	55	48	+7	48	Qualification for the CONCACAF Champions Cup Round One (Note: As 2023 Canadian Championship winners)
14	FC Dallas	34	11	10	13	41	37	+4	46	Qualification for the U.S. Open Cup Round of 32
15	Sporting Kansas City	34	12	14	8	48	51	−3	44	Qualification for the U.S. Open Cup Round of 32
16	San Jose Earthquakes	34	10	10	14	39	43	−4	44	Qualification for the U.S. Open Cup Round of 32
17	New York Red Bulls	34	11	13	10	36	39	−3	43	
18	Portland Timbers	34	11	13	10	46	58	−12	43	
19	Charlotte FC	34	10	11	13	45	52	−7	43	
20	CF Montréal	34	12	17	5	36	52	−16	41	
21	Minnesota United FC	34	10	13	11	46	51	−5	41	
22	New York City FC	34	9	11	14	35	39	−4	41	
23	D.C. United	34	10	14	10	45	49	−4	40	
24	Chicago Fire FC	34	10	14	10	39	51	−12	40	
25	Austin FC	34	10	15	9	49	55	−6	39	
26	LA Galaxy	34	8	14	12	51	67	−16	36	
27	Inter Miami CF (L)	34	9	18	7	41	54	−13	34	Qualification for the CONCACAF Champions Cup Round of 16 (Note: As 2023 Leagues Cup champion)
28	Colorado Rapids	34	5	17	12	26	54	−28	27	
29	Toronto FC	34	4	20	10	26	59	−33	22	

Source: MLS
Rules for classification: 1) points; 2) total wins; 3) total goal differential; 4) total goals scored; 5) fewer disciplinary points; 6) away goal differential; 7) away goals scored; 8) home goals differential; 9) home goals scored; 10) coin toss (2 clubs tied) or drawing of lots (≥3 clubs tied)
(C) MLS Cup champion; (L) Leagues Cup winner; (S) Supporters' Shield winner; (U) U.S. Open Cup winner; (V) Canadian Championship winner

====== MLS Playoffs ======
Bracket

The higher seeded teams hosted single-elimination matches, with the MLS Cup host determined by overall points in the Supporters' Shield table. During the best-of-three round, the team with higher seed hosted the first match, and the third match if necessary.

Wild card single match
E8	**New York Red Bulls**	**5**
E9	Charlotte FC	2
W8	**Sporting Kansas City** (p)	**0 (4)**
W9	San Jose Earthquakes	0 (2)

Round one best-of-three series
E1	**FC Cincinnati**	**3**	**1 (8)**	–
E8	New York Red Bulls	0	1 (7)	–
E4	**Philadelphia Union**	**3**	**1**	–
E5	New England Revolution	1	0	–
E3	**Columbus Crew**	**2**	2	**4**
E6	Atlanta United FC	0	**4**	2
E2	**Orlando City SC**	**1**	**1**	–
E7	Nashville SC	0	0	–
W1	St. Louis City SC	1	1	–
W8	**Sporting Kansas City**	**4**	**2**	–
W4	**Houston Dynamo FC**	**2**	1 (4)	**1 (4)**
W5	Real Salt Lake	1	**1 (5)**	1 (3)
W3	**Los Angeles FC**	**5**	**1**	–
W6	Vancouver Whitecaps FC	2	0	–
W2	**Seattle Sounders FC**	**2**	1	**1**
W7	FC Dallas	0	**3**	0

Conference semifinals single match
E1	**FC Cincinnati**	**1**
E4	Philadelphia Union	0
**Eastern Conference**
E3	**Columbus Crew** (a.e.t.)	**2**
E2	Orlando City SC	0
W8	Sporting Kansas City	0
W4	**Houston Dynamo FC**	**1**
**Western Conference**
W3	**Los Angeles FC**	**1**
W2	Seattle Sounders FC	0

Conference finals single match
E1	FC Cincinnati	2
E3	**Columbus Crew** (a.e.t.)	**3**
W4	Houston Dynamo FC	0
W3	**Los Angeles FC**	**2**

MLS Cup single match
E3	**Columbus Crew**	**2**
W3	Los Angeles FC	1

====== MLS Cup ======
December 9, 2023
4:00 p.m. EST

Columbus Crew	2–1	Los Angeles FC
Hernández 33' (pen.); Yeboah 37'	Report	Bouanga 74'

Lower.com Field, Columbus, Ohio
Attendance: 20,802
Referee: Armando Villarreal

====== MLS All-Star Game ======
2023 MLS All-Star Game
July 19, 2023
8:30 p.m. EDT

MLS All-Stars (United States) (Canada)	0–5	(England) Arsenal
	Report	Gabriel Jesus 5'; Trossard 23'; Jorginho 48' (pen.); Martinelli 84'; Havertz 89'

Audi Field, Washington, D.C.
Attendance: 20,621
Referee: Ted Unkel

===== USL Championship =====
====== Conference tables ======
Eastern Conference

Pos	Team	Pld	W	L	T	GF	GA	GD	Pts	Qualification
1	Pittsburgh Riverhounds SC (S)	34	19	5	10	50	29	+21	67	Playoffs
2	Tampa Bay Rowdies	34	19	9	6	60	39	+21	63	Playoffs
3	Charleston Battery	34	17	9	8	47	43	+4	59	Playoffs
4	Memphis 901 FC	34	14	10	10	59	53	+6	52	Playoffs
5	Louisville City FC	34	14	12	8	41	44	−3	50	Playoffs
6	Indy Eleven	34	13	11	10	46	38	+8	49	Playoffs
7	Birmingham Legion FC	34	14	16	4	44	53	−9	46	Playoffs
8	Detroit City FC	34	11	15	8	30	39	−9	41	Playoffs
9	Miami FC	34	11	15	8	43	44	−1	41	
10	FC Tulsa	34	10	15	9	43	55	−12	39	
11	Loudoun United FC	34	7	23	4	36	61	−25	25	
12	Hartford Athletic	34	4	24	6	40	79	−39	18	

Source: USL Championship Standings
Rules for classification: 1) head-to-head points; 2) head-to-head goal differential; 3) points-per game within conference; 4) total wins; 5) total goal differential; 6) total goals scored; 7) points earned against top four Conference finishers; 8) disciplinary points; 9) coin toss or drawing of lots
(S) Players' Shield winner

Western Conference

Pos	Team	Pld	W	L	T	GF	GA	GD	Pts	Qualification
1	Sacramento Republic FC	34	18	6	10	51	26	+25	64	Playoffs
2	Orange County SC	34	17	11	6	46	39	+7	57	Playoffs
3	San Diego Loyal SC	34	16	9	9	61	43	+18	57	Playoffs
4	San Antonio FC	34	14	6	14	63	38	+25	56	Playoffs
5	Colorado Springs Switchbacks FC	34	16	13	5	49	42	+7	53	Playoffs
6	Phoenix Rising FC (C)	34	12	10	12	54	41	+13	48	Playoffs
7	El Paso Locomotive FC	34	13	13	8	41	51	−10	47	Playoffs
8	New Mexico United	34	13	14	7	51	49	+2	46	Playoffs
9	Rio Grande Valley FC Toros	34	10	11	13	43	48	−5	43	
10	Oakland Roots SC	34	11	14	9	45	48	−3	42	
11	Monterey Bay FC	34	11	15	8	42	53	−11	41	
12	Las Vegas Lights FC	34	3	21	10	36	66	−30	19	

Source: USL Championship Standings
Rules for classification: 1) head-to-head points; 2) head-to-head goal differential; 3) points-per game within conference; 4) total wins; 5) total goal differential; 6) total goals scored; 7) points earned against top four Conference finishers; 8) disciplinary points; 9) coin toss or drawing of lots
(C) Champions

====== USL Championship Playoffs ======
Bracket

Conference Quarterfinals; October 21–22	Conference Semifinals; October 27–28
E1	Pittsburgh Riverhounds SC	0
**E8**	**Detroit City FC**	**1**
E8	Detroit City FC	0
**E5**	**Louisville City FC**	**4**
E4	Memphis 901 FC	1 (4)
**E5**	**Louisville City FC (p)**	**1 (5)**
**Eastern Conference**
**E3**	**Charleston Battery**	**5**
E6	Indy Eleven	0
**E3**	**Charleston Battery**	**2**
E7	Birmingham Legion FC	1
E2	Tampa Bay Rowdies	0
**E7**	**Birmingham Legion FC**	**3**
**W1**	**Sacramento Republic FC**	**1**
W8	New Mexico United	0
**W1**	**Sacramento Republic FC**	**3**
W4	San Antonio FC	1
**W4**	**San Antonio FC**	**1**
W5	Colorado Springs Switchbacks	0
**Western Conference**
W3	San Diego Loyal SC	3
**W6**	**Phoenix Rising FC (a.e.t.)**	**4**
**W6**	**Phoenix Rising FC (a.e.t.)**	**2**
W2	Orange County SC	1
**W2**	**Orange County SC**	**1**
W7	El Paso Locomotive FC	0

Conference Finals; November 4
E5	Louisville City FC	1
**E3**	**Charleston Battery**	**2**
W1	Sacramento Republic FC	1
**W6**	**Phoenix Rising FC**	**2**

USL Championship Final; November 12
E3	Charleston Battery	1 (2)
**W6**	**Phoenix Rising FC (p)**	**1 (3)**

====== USL Championship Final ======
November 12, 2023
7:00 PM EST

Charleston Battery	1–1 (a.e.t.)	Phoenix Rising FC
Markanich 36'; Avila (yellow card) 72'	Report	Traore (yellow card) 11'; Harvey (yellow card) 72'; Fuenmayor (yellow card) 73'; Cuello (yellow card) 80'; Stenberg 90'; Zambrano (yellow card) 115'; Guerra (yellow card) 117'
Penalties
Paterson (penalty scored); Williams (penalty scored); Archer (penalty missed); Allan (penalty missed); Dodson (penalty missed)	2–3	(penalty missed) Cuello; (penalty missed) Krutzen; (penalty scored) Zambrano; (penalty scored) Gallardo; (penalty scored) Arteaga

Patriots Point Soccer Complex, Mount Pleasant, South Carolina
Attendance: 5,094
Referee: Elton Garcia

Championship Game MVP: Rocco Ríos Novo (PHX)

===== USL League One =====
Pos	Team	Pld	W	L	T	GF	GA	GD	Pts	Qualification
1	Union Omaha (S)	32	19	5	8	61	41	+20	65	Qualification for the semi-finals
2	North Carolina FC (C)	32	19	7	6	58	39	+19	63	Qualification for the semi-finals
3	Northern Colorado Hailstorm FC	32	18	6	8	59	37	+22	62	Qualification for the play-offs
4	Charlotte Independence	32	13	9	10	50	42	+8	49	Qualification for the play-offs
5	Greenville Triumph SC	32	13	10	9	45	40	+5	48	Qualification for the play-offs
6	Forward Madison FC	32	11	11	10	38	40	−2	43	Qualification for the play-offs
7	Tormenta FC	32	12	14	6	55	56	−1	42	
8	One Knoxville SC	32	9	12	11	36	39	−3	38	
9	Lexington SC	32	7	14	11	46	57	−11	32	
10	Chattanooga Red Wolves SC	32	8	17	7	46	65	−19	31	
11	Richmond Kickers	32	6	15	11	42	55	−13	29	
12	Central Valley Fuego FC	32	6	21	5	36	61	−25	23	

Source: USL League One
Rules for classification: 1) points; 2) total wins; 3) total goal differential; 4) total goals scored; 5) points earned against top four Conference finishers; 6) disciplinary points; 7) drawing of lots.
(C) Champions; (S) Players' Shield winner

====== USL League One Playoffs ======
Bracket

Quarter-finals
**4**	**Charlotte Independence**	**3**
5	Greenville Triumph SC	2
**3**	**Northern Colorado Hailstorm**	**4**
6	Forward Madison FC	1

Semi-finals
1	Union Omaha	0 (4)
**4**	**Charlotte Independence** (p)	**0 (5)**
**2**	**North Carolina FC**	**3**
3	Northern Colorado Hailstorm	1

Final
4	Charlotte Independence	1 (4)
**2**	**North Carolina FC** (p)	**1 (5)**

====== USL League One Final ======
November 5, 2023
8:30 PM EST

North Carolina FC	1–1 (a.e.t.)	Charlotte Independence
Perez (yellow card) 86'; Ntalu (yellow card) 108'; Pack 111' (o.g.)	Report	Flanagan (yellow card) 71'; Mbuyu (yellow card) 88'; Acosta 99'
Penalties
Perez (penalty scored); Servania (penalty scored); Navarro (penalty scored); Maldonado (penalty scored); Arriaga (penalty scored)	5–4	(penalty scored) Kelly; (penalty missed) Johnson; (penalty scored) Acosta; (penalty scored) Álvarez; (penalty scored) Spielman

WakeMed Soccer Park, Cary, North Carolina
Attendance: 4,487
Referee: Sergii Demianchuk

Championship Game MVP: Raheem Somersall (NCA)

===== MLS Next Pro =====
====== Eastern Conference ======
Pos	Div	Team	Pld	W	SOW	SOL	L	GF	GA	GD	Pts	Qualification
1	NE	Crown Legacy FC	28	19	4	1	4	60	34	+26	66	Qualification for the Conference semifinals
2	NE	New England Revolution II	28	14	6	2	6	57	41	+16	56	Qualification for the Playoffs
3	CT	Columbus Crew 2	28	16	3	0	9	58	46	+12	54	Qualification for the Playoffs
4	NE	New York Red Bulls II	28	14	3	3	8	53	36	+17	51	Qualification for the Playoffs
5	CT	Orlando City B	28	13	2	3	10	59	61	−2	46	Qualification for the Playoffs
6	CT	Chicago Fire FC II	28	9	5	6	8	54	46	+8	43	Qualification for the Playoffs
7	NE	Philadelphia Union II	28	12	2	2	12	54	57	−3	42	Qualification for the Playoffs
8	NE	New York City FC II	28	12	1	3	12	60	55	+5	41	
9	CT	Huntsville City FC	28	9	4	3	12	48	45	+3	38	
10	CT	Atlanta United 2	28	9	2	4	13	50	52	−2	35	
11	NE	Toronto FC II	28	6	3	5	14	43	57	−14	29	
12	CT	FC Cincinnati 2	28	7	2	2	17	37	65	−28	27	
13	CT	Inter Miami CF II	28	5	1	5	17	34	68	−34	22	

Source: MLSNP Eastern Conference
Rules for classification: 1) points; 2) total wins; 3) total goal differential; 4) total goals scored; 5) fewer disciplinary points; 6) away goal differential; 7) away goals scored; 8) home goals differential; 9) home goals scored; 10) coin toss (2 clubs tied) or drawing of lots (≥3 clubs tied)

====== Western Conference ======
Pos	Div	Team	Pld	W	SOW	SOL	L	GF	GA	GD	Pts	Qualification
1	FR	Colorado Rapids 2	28	19	4	1	4	70	37	+33	66	Qualification for the Conference semifinals
2	PC	Tacoma Defiance	28	14	6	3	5	54	33	+21	57	Qualification for the Playoffs
3	FR	Sporting Kansas City II	28	13	4	2	9	59	41	+18	49	Qualification for the Playoffs
4	FR	Austin FC II	28	12	4	5	7	40	23	+17	49	Qualification for the Playoffs
5	FR	St. Louis City 2	28	11	5	4	8	48	38	+10	47	Qualification for the Playoffs
6	PC	San Jose Earthquakes II	28	11	5	2	10	41	36	+5	45	Qualification for the Playoffs
7	FR	Houston Dynamo 2	28	12	3	1	12	50	44	+6	43	Qualification for the Playoffs
8	FR	Minnesota United FC 2	28	10	5	3	10	50	52	−2	43	
9	FR	North Texas SC	28	9	1	7	11	43	45	−2	36	
10	PC	Portland Timbers 2	28	11	0	1	16	40	63	−23	34	
11	PC	Whitecaps FC 2	28	8	3	4	13	33	46	−13	34	
12	PC	Real Monarchs	28	8	2	3	15	27	54	−27	31	
13	PC	Los Angeles FC 2	28	6	0	7	15	30	39	−9	25	
14	PC	LA Galaxy II	28	5	4	2	17	36	74	−38	25	

Source: MLSNP Western Conference
Rules for classification: 1) points; 2) total wins; 3) total goal differential; 4) total goals scored; 5) fewer disciplinary points; 6) away goal differential; 7) away goals scored; 8) home goals differential; 9) home goals scored; 10) coin toss (2 clubs tied) or drawing of lots (≥3 clubs tied)

====== Overall table ======
Pos	Team	Pld	W	SOW	SOL	L	GF	GA	GD	Pts	Awards
1	Colorado Rapids 2	28	19	4	1	4	70	37	+33	66	Regular season champion and U.S. Open Cup First Round
2	Crown Legacy FC	28	19	4	1	4	60	34	+26	66	U.S. Open Cup First Round
3	Tacoma Defiance	28	14	6	3	5	57	36	+21	57	
4	New England Revolution II	28	14	6	2	6	57	41	+16	56	
5	Columbus Crew 2	28	16	3	0	9	58	46	+12	54	
6	New York Red Bulls II	28	14	3	3	8	53	36	+17	51	U.S. Open Cup First Round
7	Sporting Kansas City II	28	13	4	2	9	60	42	+18	49	U.S. Open Cup First Round
8	Austin FC II	28	12	4	5	7	40	23	+17	49	
9	St. Louis City 2	28	11	5	4	8	49	39	+10	47	
10	Orlando City B	28	13	2	3	10	59	61	−2	46	
11	San Jose Earthquakes II	28	11	5	2	10	41	36	+5	45	
12	Houston Dynamo 2	28	12	3	1	12	50	44	+6	43	
13	Minnesota United FC 2	28	10	5	3	10	50	52	−2	43	U.S. Open Cup First Round
14	Chicago Fire FC II	28	9	5	6	8	54	46	+8	43	U.S. Open Cup First Round
15	Philadelphia Union II	28	12	2	2	12	54	57	−3	42	
16	New York City FC II	28	12	1	3	12	60	55	+5	41	U.S. Open Cup First Round
17	Huntsville City FC	28	9	4	3	12	48	45	+3	38	
18	North Texas SC	28	9	1	7	11	43	45	−2	36	
19	Atlanta United 2	28	9	2	4	13	50	52	−2	35	
20	Portland Timbers 2	28	11	0	1	16	40	63	−23	34	U.S. Open Cup First Round
21	Whitecaps FC 2	28	8	3	4	13	36	49	−13	34	
22	Real Monarchs	28	8	2	3	15	27	54	−27	31	
23	Toronto FC II	28	6	3	5	14	43	57	−14	29	
24	FC Cincinnati 2	28	7	2	2	17	37	65	−28	27	
25	Los Angeles FC 2	28	6	0	7	15	30	39	−9	25	
26	LA Galaxy II	28	5	4	2	17	36	74	−38	25	U.S. Open Cup First Round
27	Inter Miami CF II	28	5	1	5	17	34	68	−34	22	

Source: MLSNP
Rules for classification: 1) points; 2) total wins; 3) total goal differential; 4) total goals scored; 5) fewer disciplinary points; 6) away goal differential; 7) away goals scored; 8) home goals differential; 9) home goals scored; 10) coin toss (2 clubs tied) or drawing of lots (≥3 clubs tied)

====== MLS Next Pro Playoffs ======
Bracket

Conference Quarterfinals; September 29–October 1	Conference Semifinals; October 6–8
E1	Crown Legacy FC	0
**E3**	**Columbus Crew 2**	**1**
**E3**	**Columbus Crew 2**	**2**
E5	Orlando City B	1
**Eastern Conference**
**E2**	**New England Revolution II**	**3**
E7	Philadelphia Union II	2
**E2**	**New England Revolution II**	**2**
E4	New York Red Bulls II	1
**E4**	**New York Red Bulls II**	**4**
E6	Chicago Fire FC II	1
**W1**	**Colorado Rapids 2**	**1**
W6	San Jose Earthquakes II	0
W5	St. Louis City 2	0
**W6**	**San Jose Earthquakes II**	**2**
**Western Conference**
**W2**	**Tacoma Defiance**	**4**
W7	Houston Dynamo 2	3
W2	Tacoma Defiance	0
**W4**	**Austin FC II**	**1**
W3	Sporting Kansas City II	0
**W4**	**Austin FC II**	**2**

Conference Finals; October 14–15
**E3**	**Columbus Crew 2**	**1**
E2	New England Revolution II	0
W1	Colorado Rapids 2	0 (1)
**W4**	**Austin FC II** (p)	**0 (4)**

MLS Next Pro Final; October 22
E3	Columbus Crew 2	1
**W4**	**Austin FC II**	**3**

===== National Independent Soccer Association =====
Pos	Team	Pld	W	D	L	GF	GA	GD	Pts	Qualification
1	Chattanooga FC (X)	24	15	7	2	41	12	+29	52	Qualification for the semifinals
2	Michigan Stars	24	13	7	4	37	21	+16	46	Qualification for the semifinals
3	Los Angeles Force	24	13	5	6	33	21	+12	44	Qualification for the playoffs
4	Albion San Diego	24	11	8	5	31	21	+10	41	Qualification for the playoffs
5	Maryland Bobcats	24	11	3	10	31	22	+9	36	Qualification for the playoffs
6	City Union (C)	24	8	3	13	30	34	−4	27	Qualification for the playoffs
7	Club de Lyon	24	6	5	13	23	45	−22	23	
8	Savannah Clovers	24	4	7	13	19	47	−28	19	
9	Gold Star FC	24	3	3	18	23	45	−22	12	

Source: nisasoccer.com
Rules for classification: 1) points per game; 2) goal differential; 3) goals for; 4) head-to-head; 5) goals against
(C) Champions; (X) Regular season winner

===== National Independent Soccer Association Playoffs =====
Bracket

Quarterfinal; October 29
3	Los Angeles Force	2
**6**	**Flower City Union**	**4**

Quarterfinal; October 28
**4**	**Albion San Diego (p)**	**0 (8)**
5	Maryland Bobcats FC	0 (7)

Semifinals; November 4/5
1	Chattanooga FC	0 (0)
**6**	**Flower City Union (p)**	**0 (2)**
**2**	**Michigan Stars FC**	**3**
4	Albion San Diego	2

NISA Championship Final; November 11
**6**	**Flower City Union**	**1**
2	Michigan Stars FC	0

==== Cup competitions ====
===== US Open Cup =====
====== Final ======
September 27, 2023
8:30 p.m. EDT

Inter Miami CF	1–2	Houston Dynamo FC
Martínez 90+2'	MLS; USSF	Dorsey 24'; Bassi 33' (pen.)

DRV PNK Stadium, Fort Lauderdale, Florida
Attendance: 20,288
Referee: Jon Freemon

==== International competitions ====
===== FIFA Club World Cup =====
First round
1 February – Tangier
**(Egypt) Al Ahly**	**3**
(New Zealand) Auckland City	0

Second round
4 February – Tangier
(United States) Seattle Sounders FC	0
**(Egypt) Al Ahly**	**1**
4 February – Rabat
(Morocco) Wydad Casablanca	1 (3)
(Saudi Arabia) Al-Hilal (p)	1 (5)

Semi-finals
8 February – Rabat
(Egypt) Al Ahly	1
**(Spain) Real Madrid**	**4**
7 February – Tangier
(Brazil) Flamengo	2
**(Saudi Arabia) Al-Hilal**	**3**

Final
11 February – Rabat
**(Spain) Real Madrid**	**5**
(Saudi Arabia) Al-Hilal	3
Third place
11 February – Tangier
(Egypt) Al Ahly	2
**(Brazil) Flamengo**	**4**

====== 2nd round ======
Team 1	Score	Team 2
Seattle Sounders FC (United States)	0–1	(Egypt) **Al Ahly**

===== CONCACAF competitions =====
====== CONCACAF Champions League ======
Club	Competition	Final round
Los Angeles FC	2023 CONCACAF Champions League	Final
Philadelphia Union	2023 CONCACAF Champions League	Semi-finals
Austin FC	2023 CONCACAF Champions League	Round of 16
Orlando City SC	2023 CONCACAF Champions League	Round of 16

teams in bold are still active in the competition

Round of 16

Team 1	Agg.	Team 2	1st leg	2nd leg
**Violette** (Haiti)	3–2	(United States) Austin FC	3–0	0–2
**UANL** (Mexico)	1–1 (a)	(United States) Orlando City SC	0–0	1–1
Alajuelense (Costa Rica)	2–4	(United States) **Los Angeles FC**	0–3	2–1
Alianza (El Salvador)	0–4	(United States) **Philadelphia Union**	0–0	0–4

Quarter-finals

Team 1	Agg.	Team 2	1st leg	2nd leg
Vancouver Whitecaps FC (Canada)	0–6	(United States) **Los Angeles FC**	0–3	0–3
Atlas (Mexico)	2–3	(United States) **Philadelphia Union**	0–1	2–2

Seim-finals

Team 1	Agg.	Team 2	1st leg	2nd leg
Philadelphia Union (United States)	1–4	(United States) **Los Angeles FC**	1–1	0–3

Final

Team 1	Agg.	Team 2	1st leg	2nd leg
**León** (Mexico)	3–1	(United States) Los Angeles FC	2–1	1–0

====== Leagues Cup ======
Group stage

West

West 1

Pos	Team	Pld	Pts	UAN	POR	SJE
1	(Mexico) UANL	2	**6**	—	2–1	1–0
2	(United States) Portland Timbers	2	**3**	—	—	2–0
3	(United States) San Jose Earthquakes	2	**0**	—	—	—

Source: Leagues Cup
West 2

Pos	Team	Pld	Pts	MON	RSL	SEA
1	(Mexico) Monterrey	2	**6**	—	3–0	4–2
2	(United States) Real Salt Lake	2	**3**	—	—	3–0
3	(United States) Seattle Sounders FC	2	**0**	—	—	—

Source: Leagues Cup
West 3

Pos	Team	Pld	Pts	LEO	VAN	LAX
1	(Mexico) León	2	**5**	—	—	—
2	(Canada) Vancouver Whitecaps FC	2	**4**	2–2	—	—
3	(United States) LA Galaxy	2	**0**	0–1	1–2	—

Source: Leagues Cup

Central

Central 1
Central 2

Pos	Team	Pld	Pts	CLB	CAM	STL
1	(United States) Columbus Crew	2	**6**	—	—	2–1
2	(Mexico) América	2	**3**	1–4	—	4–0
3	(United States) St. Louis City SC	2	**0**	—	—	—

Source: Leagues Cup

Pos	Team	Pld	Pts	CHI	MIN	PUE
1	(United States) Chicago Fire FC	2	**4**	—	—	—
2	(United States) Minnesota United FC	2	**3**	2–3	—	—
3	(Mexico) Puebla	2	**2**	1–1	0–4	—

Source: Leagues Cup
Central 3
Central 4

Pos	Team	Pld	Pts	CIN	SKC	GUA
1	(United States) FC Cincinnati	2	**5**	—	3–3	—
2	(United States) Sporting Kansas City	2	**4**	—	—	—
3	(Mexico) Guadalajara	2	**0**	1–3	0–1	—

Source: Leagues Cup

Pos	Team	Pld	Pts	TOL	NAS	COL
1	(Mexico) Toluca	2	**6**	—	—	4–1
2	(United States) Nashville SC	2	**3**	3–4	—	2–1
3	(United States) Colorado Rapids	2	**0**	—	—	—

Source: Leagues Cup

South

South 1
South 2

Pos	Team	Pld	Pts	MAZ	JUA	AUS
1	(Mexico) Mazatlán	2	**5**	—	1–1	—
2	(Mexico) Juárez	2	**4**	—	—	—
3	(United States) Austin FC	2	**0**	1–3	1–3	—

Source: Leagues Cup

Pos	Team	Pld	Pts	ORL	HOU	SAN
1	(United States) Orlando City SC	2	**5**	—	1–1	—
2	(United States) Houston Dynamo FC	2	**3**	—	—	—
3	(Mexico) Santos Laguna	2	**1**	2–3	2–2	—

Source: Leagues Cup
South 3
South 4

Pos	Team	Pld	Pts	MIA	CAZ	ATL
1	(United States) Inter Miami CF	2	**6**	—	—	4–0
2	(Mexico) Cruz Azul	2	**2**	1–2	—	1–1
3	(United States) Atlanta United FC	2	**1**	—	—	—

Source: Leagues Cup

Pos	Team	Pld	Pts	CLT	DAL	NEC
1	(United States) Charlotte FC	2	**5**	—	—	—
2	(United States) FC Dallas	2	**4**	2–2	—	3–0
3	(Mexico) Necaxa	2	**0**	1–4	—	—

Source: Leagues Cup

East

East 1
East 2

Pos	Team	Pld	Pts	PHI	QFC	TIJ
1	(United States) Philadelphia Union	2	**6**	—	5–1	3–1
2	(Mexico) Querétaro	2	**3**	—	—	—
3	(Mexico) Tijuana	2	**0**	—	0–1	—

Source: Leagues Cup

Pos	Team	Pld	Pts	UNM	DCU	MTL
1	(Mexico) UNAM	2	**4**	—	3–0	—
2	(United States) D.C. United	2	**3**	—	—	—
3	(Canada) CF Montréal	2	**2**	2–2	0–1	—

Source: Leagues Cup
East 3
East 4

Pos	Team	Pld	Pts	ATL	NYC	TOR
1	(Mexico) Atlas	2	**6**	—	—	1–0
2	(United States) New York City FC	2	**3**	0–1	—	5–0
3	(Canada) Toronto FC	2	**0**	—	—	—

Source: Leagues Cup

Pos	Team	Pld	Pts	NYR	NER	ASL
1	(United States) New York Red Bulls	2	**5**	—	0–0	2–1
2	(United States) New England Revolution	2	**4**	—	—	—
3	(Mexico) Atlético San Luis	2	**0**	—	1–5	—

Source: Leagues Cup

Knockout stage

Round of 32

Team 1	Score	Team 2
**Inter Miami CF** (United States)	3–1	(United States) Orlando City SC
Mazatlán (Mexico)	1–2	(United States) **FC Dallas**
Pachuca (Mexico)	0–0 (3–5 p)	(United States) **Houston Dynamo FC**
**Los Angeles FC** (United States)	7–1	(Mexico) Juárez
Atlas (Mexico)	2–2 (7–8 p)	(United States) **New England Revolution**
**Philadelphia Union** (United States)	0–0 (5–4 p)	(United States) D.C. United
**New York Red Bulls** (United States)	1–0	(United States) New York City FC
**Charlotte FC** (United States)	0–0 (4–3 p)	(Mexico) Cruz Azul
León (Mexico)	1–3	(United States) **Real Salt Lake**
Columbus Crew (United States)	3–3 (3–4 p)	(United States) **Minnesota United FC**
FC Cincinnati (United States)	1–1 (4–5 p)	(United States) **Nashville SC**
Chicago Fire FC (United States)	0–1	(Mexico) **América**
**Toluca** (Mexico)	4–1	(United States) Sporting Kansas City
**Monterrey** (Mexico)	1–0	(United States) Portland Timbers

Round of 16

Team 1	Score	Team 2
FC Dallas (United States)	4–4 (3–5 p)	(United States) **Inter Miami CF**
**Querétaro** (Mexico)	1–1 (4–3 p)	(United States) New England Revolution
**Charlotte FC** (United States)	2–1	(United States) Houston Dynamo FC
América (Mexico)	2–2 (5–6 p)	(United States) **Nashville SC**
**Philadelphia Union** (United States)	1–1 (4–3 p)	(United States) New York Red Bulls
Toluca (Mexico)	2–2 (2–4 p)	(United States) **Minnesota United FC**
**Los Angeles FC** (United States)	4–0	(United States) Real Salt Lake

Quarter-finals

The matches were played on August 11, 2023.

Team 1	Score	Team 2
**Inter Miami CF** (United States)	4–0	(United States) Charlotte FC
**Nashville SC** (United States)	5–0	(United States) Minnesota United FC
**Philadelphia Union** (United States)	2–1	(Mexico) Querétaro
Los Angeles FC (United States)	2–3	(Mexico) **Monterrey**

Semi-finals

The matches were played on August 15, 2023.

Team 1	Score	Team 2
Philadelphia Union (United States)	1–4	(United States) **Inter Miami CF**
Monterrey (Mexico)	0–2	(United States) **Nashville SC**

Third place play-off

The winner of the third place play-off qualified for the first round of the 2024 CONCACAF Champions Cup.

August 19, 2023
18:00

Philadelphia Union (United States)	3–0	(Mexico) Monterrey
Bueno 1'; Uhre 45+2'; Bedoya 69'	Report

Subaru Park, Chester, Pennsylvania
Attendance: 17,731
Referee: Juan Gabriel Calderón (Costa Rica)

Final

August 19, 2023
8:00 p.m. CDT

Nashville SC (United States)	1–1	(United States) Inter Miami CF
Picault 57'	Report	Messi 23'
Penalties
Mukhtar (penalty scored); Leal (penalty missed); Godoy (penalty scored); Zimmerman (penalty scored); Surridge (penalty scored); Moore (penalty scored); Lovitz (penalty scored); MacNaughton (penalty scored); Davis (penalty scored); Shaffelburg (penalty scored); Panicco (penalty missed)	9–10	(penalty scored) Messi; (penalty scored) Busquets; (penalty scored) Campana; (penalty scored) Miller; (penalty missed) Ulloa; (penalty scored) Kryvtsov; (penalty scored) Alba; (penalty scored) Gómez; (penalty scored) Ruiz; (penalty scored) Yedlin; (penalty scored) Callender

Geodis Park, Nashville, Tennessee
Attendance: 30,109
Referee: Ismail Elfath (United States)

====== Campeones Cup ======
September 27, 2023
20:00 PDT (UTC−07:00)

Los Angeles FC (United States)	0–0	(Mexico) UANL
	Report
Penalties
Bouanga (penalty scored); Tillman (penalty missed); Ilie (penalty scored); Hollingshead (penalty missed)	2–4	(penalty scored) Gignac; (penalty scored) Ibáñez; (penalty scored) Pizarro; (penalty scored) Angulo

BMO Stadium, Los Angeles, California
Attendance: 20,605
Referee: Drew Fischer (Canada)

=== Women's ===
==== League competitions ====
===== National Women's Soccer League =====
====== Regular season ======
Pos	Team	Pld	W	D	L	GF	GA	GD	Pts	Qualification
1	San Diego Wave FC (S)	22	11	4	7	31	22	+9	37	NWSL Shield, Playoff semifinals, and CONCACAF W Champions Cup
2	Portland Thorns FC	22	10	5	7	42	32	+10	35	Playoff semifinals and W Champions Cup
3	North Carolina Courage	22	9	6	7	29	22	+7	33	Playoff quarterfinals
4	OL Reign	22	9	5	8	29	24	+5	32	Playoff quarterfinals
5	Angel City FC	22	8	7	7	31	30	+1	31	Playoff quarterfinals
6	NJ/NY Gotham FC (C)	22	8	7	7	25	24	+1	31	Playoff quarterfinals
7	Orlando Pride	22	10	1	11	27	28	−1	31	
8	Washington Spirit	22	7	9	6	26	29	−3	30	
9	Racing Louisville FC	22	6	9	7	25	24	+1	27	
10	Houston Dash	22	6	8	8	16	18	−2	26	
11	Kansas City Current	22	8	2	12	30	36	−6	26	
12	Chicago Red Stars	22	7	3	12	28	50	−22	24	

Source: NWSL
Rules for classification: Tiebreakers
(C) Champions and W Champions Cup; (S) NWSL Shield

====== Playoffs ======
**First round**
**4**	**OL Reign**	**1**
5	Angel City FC	0
3	North Carolina Courage	0
**6**	**NJ/NY Gotham FC**	**2**

**Semifinals**
1	San Diego Wave FC	0
**4**	**OL Reign**	**1**
2	Portland Thorns FC	0
**6**	**NJ/NY Gotham FC (a.e.t.)**	**1**

**Championship**
4	OL Reign	1
**6**	**NJ/NY Gotham FC**	**2**

Final

November 11
17:00 PST

OL Reign	1–2	NJ/NY Gotham FC
Lavelle 29'	Report	Williams 24'; González 45+2'

Snapdragon Stadium, San Diego, California
Attendance: 25,011
Referee: Ekaterina Koroleva

===== United Women's Soccer =====
UWS National Championship

**Semifinals**; July 22 — Santa Clarita, CA
**Santa Clarita Blue Heat**	**3**
Lancaster Inferno FC	2
Sporting CT	2
**Michigan Jaguars**	**4**

**Championship**; July 23 — Santa Clarita, CA
Santa Clarita Blue Heat	0 (2)
**Michigan Jaguars (p)**	**0 (4)**

UWS National Championship finals

July 23, 2023
19:00 PDT (UTC−07:00)

Michigan Jaguars FC	0–0	Santa Clarita Blue Heat
Penalties
	4–2

College of the Canyons, Santa Clarita, California

===== USL W League =====
USL W League Playoffs

**Conference semifinals**
Long Island Rough Riders	2
**Morris Elite SC**	**3**
**Eastern Conference**
**Eagle FC**	**2**
Christos FC	1
**Tampa Bay United**	**3**
Tennessee SC	2
**Southern Conference**
**North Carolina Courage U23**	**3**
FC Miami City	0
**Minnesota Aurora FC**	**1**
Chicago City SC	0
**Central Conference**
Flint City AFC	0
**Indy Eleven**	**3**
**San Francisco Glens SC**	**5**
Oakland Soul SC	1
**Western Conference**
**California Storm**	**1**
Oly Town FC	0

**Conference finals**
Morris Elite SC	0
**Eagle FC**	**6**
Tampa Bay United	0
**North Carolina Courage U23**	**3**
Minnesota Aurora FC	0
**Indy Eleven**	**1**
**San Francisco Glens SC**	**2**
California Storm	1

**Semifinals**
Eagle FC	1
**North Carolina Courage U23**	**4**
**Indy Eleven**	**3**
San Francisco Glens SC	2

**Final**
North Carolina Courage U23	1
**Indy Eleven (a.e.t.)**	**2**

===== Women's Premier Soccer League =====
The WPSL announced its playoff bracket on July 10, 2023.

WPSL Playoffs

**Regional semifinals** July 15
**SC Del Sol**	**3**
SoCal Reds FC	0
**West**
**California Storm**	**1**
Westside Metros FC	0
**Colorado Rapids Women**	**1**
KC Courage	0
**Central**
**FC Milwaukee Torrent**	**0 (7)**
Salvo SC	0 (6)
**Nashville Rhythm FC**	**1**
AHFC Royals	0
**South**
FC Prime	0
**Charlotte Eagles**	**1**
**Clarkstown SC**	**4**
SUSA FC	0
**East**
Reading United AC	1
**Rhode Island Rogues**	**3**

**Regional finals** July 16
**SC Del Sol**	**1**
California Storm	0
Colorado Rapids Women	0
**Salvo SC**	**2**
Nashville Rhythm FC	4
**Charlotte Eagles**	**5**
Clarkstown SC	1
**Rhode Island Rogues**	**2**

**Championship semifinals** July 22
SC Del Sol	0
**Salvo SC**	**2**
**Charlotte Eagles**	**1**
Rhode Island Rogues	0

**Championship**; July 23
Salvo SC	0
**Charlotte Eagles**	**1**

Jerry Zanelli Cup - WPSL Championship

July 23, 2023
19:00 CDT (UTC−05:00)

Charlotte Eagles	1–0	Salvo SC
Kelly Flanders 90+1'	Report

Neal Patterson Stadium, Stillwater, Oklahoma

==== Cup competitions ====
===== NWSL Challenge Cup =====
====== Group ======
East Division

Pos	Team	Pld	W	T	L	GF	GA	GD	Pts	Qualification	NC	NJY	WAS	ORL
1	North Carolina Courage	6	3	2	1	15	5	+10	**11**	Advance to knockout stage	—	1–1	6–0	0–0
2	NJ/NY Gotham FC	6	3	2	1	10	7	+3	**11**		2–0	—	1–0	1–1
3	Washington Spirit	6	3	0	3	10	13	−3	**9**		1–2	4–2	—	4–2
4	Orlando Pride	6	0	2	4	5	15	−10	**2**		1–1	1–3	0–1	—

Source: NWSL

Central Division

Pos	Team	Pld	W	T	L	GF	GA	GD	Pts	Qualification	KC	LOU	HOU	CHI
1	Kansas City Current	6	4	1	1	14	4	+10	**13**	Advance to knockout stage	—	3–0	3–1	4–0
2	Racing Louisville FC	6	4	0	2	10	6	+4	**12**	Advance to knockout stage based on ranking	3–2	—	3–0	2–0
3	Houston Dash	6	2	0	4	4	11	−7	**6**		0–2	1–0	—	2–0
4	Chicago Red Stars	6	1	1	4	3	10	−7	**4**		0–0	0–2	3–0	—

Source: NWSL

West Division

Pos	Team	Pld	W	T	L	GF	GA	GD	Pts	Qualification	RGN	LA	POR	SD
1	OL Reign	6	4	2	0	7	0	+7	**14**	Advance to knockout stage	—	0–0	0–0	1–0
2	Angel City FC	6	2	2	2	7	8	−1	**8**		0–2	—	2–1	2–1
3	Portland Thorns FC	6	2	1	3	8	7	+1	**7**		0–1	3–2	—	4–1
4	San Diego Wave FC	6	1	1	4	4	11	−7	**4**		0–3	1–1	1–0	—

Source: NWSL

Ranking of second-placed teams

The best second-placed team from the group stage advanced to the knockout stage.

Pos	Grp	Team	Pld	W	T	L	GF	GA	GD	Pts	Qualification
1	**Central**	Racing Louisville FC	6	4	0	2	10	6	+4	**12**	Advance to knockout stage
2	**East**	NJ/NY Gotham FC	6	3	2	1	10	7	+3	**11**	
3	**West**	Angel City FC	6	2	2	2	7	8	−1	**8**	

Source: NWSL

====== Knockout stage ======
**Semifinals**
1	OL Reign	0
**4**	**Racing Louisville FC**	**1**
2	Kansas City Current	0
**3**	**North Carolina Courage**	**1**

**Championship**
4	Racing Louisville FC	0
**3**	**North Carolina Courage**	**2**

Final

September 9
12:30 ET

North Carolina Courage	2–0	Racing Louisville FC
Kerolin 28'; Kurtz (yellow card) 45'; Matsukubo 54'	Report	DeMelo (yellow card) 73'

WakeMed Soccer Park, Cary, North Carolina
Attendance: 3,068
Referee: Alex Billeter

== Honors ==
=== Professional ===
Men
Competition		Winner
U.S. Open Cup		Houston Dynamo FC
MLS Supporters' Shield		FC Cincinnati
MLS Cup		Columbus Crew
Leagues Cup		Inter Miami CF
USL Championship	Players' Shield	Pittsburgh Riverhounds SC
USL Championship	Playoffs	Phoenix Rising FC
MLS Next Pro	Regular season	Colorado Rapids 2
MLS Next Pro	Playoffs	Austin FC II
USL League One	Players' Shield	Union Omaha
USL League One	Playoffs	North Carolina FC
NISA	Regular season	Chattanooga FC
NISA	Playoffs	Flower City Union

Women
Competition	Winner
NWSL Challenge Cup	North Carolina Courage
National Women's Soccer League	NJ/NY Gotham FC
NWSL Shield	San Diego Wave FC

=== Amateur ===
Men
Competition	Team
USL League Two	Ballard FC
National Premier Soccer League	Tulsa Athletic
National Amateur Cup	MesoAmerica-San Carlos FC
NCAA Division I Soccer Championship	Clemson University
NCAA Division II Soccer Championship	Franklin Pierce University
NCAA Division III Soccer Championship	St. Olaf College (MN)
NAIA Soccer Championship	MidAmerica Nazarene University (KS)

Women
Competition	Team
United Women's Soccer	Michigan Jaguars FC
USL W League	Indy Eleven
Women's Premier Soccer League	Charlotte Eagles
NCAA Division I Soccer Championship	Florida State University
NCAA Division II Soccer Championship	Point Loma Nazarene
NCAA Division III Soccer Championship	Cal Lutheran
NAIA Soccer Championship	University of the Cumberlands (KY)
