= Football at the 2023 Pan American Games – Women's tournament =

Football – Women's tournament at the 2023 Pan American Games
- Venues: Estadio Sausalito (Viña del Mar); Estadio Elías Figueroa Brander (Valparaíso)
- Dates: 22 October – 3 November 2023

Medalists
Gold medal	Mexico
Silver medal	Chile
Bronze medal	United States

The Women's football tournament at the 2023 Pan American Games was held in Valparaíso and Viña del Mar from 22 October to 3 November 2023.

== Qualification ==
A total of eight women's teams qualified to compete at the games, four CONMEBOL teams and four CONCACAF teams. For CONMEBOL, the three teams ranked third to fifth at the 2022 Copa América Femenina qualified, while Chile automatically qualified as hosts; however, Venezuela declined to participate less than a month until the tournament due to lack of release of players by clubs, so Bolivia replaced the country. For CONCACAF, the best team from each of the three zones (North American, Central American and Caribbean) at the 2022 CONCACAF Women's Championship qualified; however, Canada declined to participate due to scheduling issues, so Mexico qualified for the North American berth.

United States competed with an under-19 team.

=== Qualified teams ===
Event		Dates	Location	Quota(s)	Qualified
Host nation		—N/a	—N/a	1	Chile
2022 CONCACAF W Championship	Champions	July 4−18	Mexico	1	United States
2022 CONCACAF W Championship	Top Caribbean team	July 4−18	Mexico	1	Jamaica
2022 CONCACAF W Championship	Top Central American team	July 4−18	Mexico	1	Costa Rica
2022 CONCACAF W Championship	Top North American team	July 4−18	Mexico	1	~~Canada~~; Mexico^{[a]}
2022 Copa América Femenina	3rd to 5th place	July 8−30	Colombia	3	Argentina; Paraguay; ~~Venezuela~~^{[b]} Bolivia^{[c]}
Total				8	

^{[a]} Mexico replaced Canada after the latter withdrew citing scheduling issues.
^{b} Host nation Chile finished fifth, meaning sixth place Venezuela also qualified.
^{c} Bolivia replaced Venezuela after the latter withdrew.

== Venues ==
Viña del Mar	Valparaíso
Estadio Sausalito	Estadio Elías Figueroa Brander
Capacity: 23,423	Capacity: 20,575
Football at the 2023 Pan American Games – Women's tournament is located in Chile

== Squads ==
There were no age restrictions for the women's event.

== Group stage ==
Tie-breakers

All times are local, PET (UTC−3).

=== Group A ===
Pos	Team	Pld	W	D	L	GF	GA	GD	Pts	Qualification
1	Mexico	3	3	0	0	14	2	+12	9	Semi-finals
2	Chile (H)	3	2	0	1	8	3	+5	6	Semi-finals
3	Paraguay	3	1	0	2	11	5	+6	3	Fifth place match
4	Jamaica	3	0	0	3	0	23	−23	0	Seventh place match

Source: Santiago2023
Rules for classification: Tie-breakers
(H) Hosts
22 October 2023
13:00

Mexico	7–0	Jamaica
Sánchez 12', 75'; Nieto 35'; Palacios 42'; Ordóñez 58'; Cervantes 68'; Corral 85' (pen.)	Report

Estadio Elías Figueroa Brander, Valparaíso
Referee: Paula Andrea Fernandez (Colombia)
22 October 2023
18:00

Chile	1–0	Paraguay
Zamora 24'	Report

Estadio Elías Figueroa Brander, Valparaíso
Referee: Helena De Siqueira (Brazil)

25 October 2023
15:00

Paraguay	10–0	Jamaica
Alonso 6'; J. Martínez 18', 46', 53'; Fernández 22'; Sandoval 24', 90'; Bogarín 52'; R. Martínez 81'; Bareiro 89'	Report

Estadio Sausalito, Viña del Mar
Referee: Gisselle Giler (Ecuador)
25 October 2023
20:00

Chile	1–3	Mexico
Pinilla 37'	Report	Bernal 56'; Sánchez 74'; Ordóñez 88'

Estadio Sausalito, Viña del Mar
Referee: Milagros Arruela (Peru)

28 October 2023
13:00

Mexico	4–1	Paraguay
Camberos 37'; Ordóñez 41'; Sánchez 67'; Ovalle 70'	Report	Fernández 9'

Estadio Sausalito, Viña del Mar
Referee: Priscila Vasquez (Peru)
28 October 2023
18:00

Chile	6–0	Jamaica
Jiménez 44'; López 45+5'; Caniguán 55'; Olave 68'; José Urrutia 78'; Araya 82'	Report

Estadio Elías Figueroa Brander, Valparaíso
Referee: Paula Fernandes (Colombia)

=== Group B ===
Pos	Team	Pld	W	D	L	GF	GA	GD	Pts	Qualification
1	United States	3	3	0	0	13	1	+12	9	Semi-finals
2	Argentina	3	1	1	1	3	4	−1	4	Semi-finals
3	Costa Rica	3	0	2	1	1	3	−2	2	Fifth place match
4	Bolivia	3	0	1	2	0	9	−9	1	Seventh place match

Source: Santiago2023
Rules for classification: Tie-breakers
22 October 2023
15:00

United States	6–0	Bolivia
McDonald 4', 22', 68'; Villarreal 19', 58'; Adames 33'	Report

Estadio Sausalito, Viña del Mar
Referee: Stefani Escobar (Venezuela)
22 October 2023
20:00

Costa Rica	0–0	Argentina
	Report

Estadio Sausalito, Viña del Mar
Referee: Priscila Vasquez (Peru)

25 October 2023
13:00

United States	3–1	Costa Rica
Collins 10'; Hutton 72'; Adames 76'	Report	Fonseca 34'

Estadio Elías Figueroa Brander, Valparaíso
Referee: Maria Belen Lupera Reto (Ecuador)
25 October 2023
18:00

Bolivia	0–3	Argentina
	Report	Cometti 11'; Stábile 48' (pen.); Cruz 90+5'

Estadio Elías Figueroa Brander, Valparaíso
Referee: Gabriela Arce (Paraguay)

28 October 2023
13:00

United States	4–0	Argentina
Bodak 15'; Kohler 20'; Villarreal 50'; Restovich 54'	Report

Estadio Elías Figueroa Brander, Valparaíso
Referee: Andreza De Siqueira (Brazil)
28 October 2023
18:00

Costa Rica	0–0	Bolivia
	Report

Estadio Sausalito, Viña del Mar
Referee: Stefani Escobar (Venezuela)

== Placement stage (5th–8th place) ==
7th place
31 October — Valparaíso
Jamaica	1
Bolivia	2

5th place
31 October — Viña del Mar
Paraguay	3
Costa Rica	1

=== Seventh place match ===
31 October 2023
12:00

Jamaica	1–2	Bolivia
Bonnick 48'	Report	Alurralde 24'; Méndez 67'

Estadio Elías Figueroa Brander, Valparaíso
Referee: Gabriela Arce (Paraguay)

=== Fifth place match ===
31 October 2023
14:00

Paraguay	3–1	Costa Rica
R. Fernández 24', 31'; J. Martínez 26'	Report	Valenciano 20'

Estadio Sausalito, Viña del Mar
Referee: Maria Belen Lupera Reto (Ecuador)

== Knockout stage ==
If necessary, extra time and penalty shoot-out would be used to decide the winner.

Semi-finals
31 October — Valparaíso
Mexico	2
Argentina	0
31 October — Viña del Mar
Chile	2
United States	1

Gold medal match
3 November — Valparaíso
Mexico	1
Chile	0
Bronze medal match
3 November — Valparaíso
Argentina	0
United States	2

=== Semi-finals ===
31 October 2023
17:00

Mexico	2–0	Argentina
Ovalle 32', 89'	Report

Estadio Elías Figueroa Brander, Valparaíso
Referee: Paula Fernández (Colombia)
31 October 2023
20:00

Chile	2–1	United States
Araya 37'; Aedo 45' (pen.)	Report	Adames 52'

Estadio Sausalito, Viña del Mar
Referee: Andreza De Siqueira (Brazil)

=== Bronze medal match ===
3 November 2023
13:00

Argentina	0–2	United States
	Report	Villarreal 30'; Hutton 37'

Estadio Elías Figueroa Brander, Valparaíso
Referee: Stefani Escobar (Venezuela)

=== Gold medal match ===
3 November 2023
20:00

Mexico	1–0	Chile
Bernal 29'	Report

Estadio Elías Figueroa Brander, Valparaíso
Referee: Milagros Arruela (Peru)

2023 Pan American Games Women's football tournament
winners

Mexico
1st title

== Final standings ==
Rank	Team
1st place, gold medalist(s)	Mexico
2nd place, silver medalist(s)	Chile
3rd place, bronze medalist(s)	United States
4	Argentina
5	Paraguay
6	Costa Rica
7	Bolivia
8	Jamaica

== Goalscorers ==
There were 65 goals scored in 18 matches, for an average of 3.61 goals per match.

4 goals

- (Mexico) María Sánchez
- (Paraguay) Rebeca Fernández
- (Paraguay) Jessica Martínez
- (United States) Amalia Villarreal

3 goals

- (Mexico) Diana Ordóñez
- (Mexico) Lizbeth Ovalle
- (United States) Emeri Adames
- (United States) Ava McDonald

2 goals

- (Chile) Karen Araya
- (Mexico) Rebeca Bernal
- (Paraguay) Fabiola Sandoval
- (United States) Claire Hutton

1 goal

- (Argentina) Aldana Cometti
- (Argentina) Julieta Cruz
- (Argentina) Eliana Stábile
- (Bolivia) Samantha Alurralde
- (Bolivia) Carla Méndez
- (Chile) Yanara Aedo
- (Chile) Franchesca Caniguán
- (Chile) Yastin Jiménez
- (Chile) Yessenia López
- (Chile) Isidora Olave
- (Chile) Fernanda Pinilla
- (Chile) María José Urrutia
- (Chile) Daniela Zamora
- (Costa Rica) Tanisha Fonseca
- (Costa Rica) Emilie Valenciano
- (Jamaica) Sheyenne Bonnick
- (Mexico) Scarlett Camberos
- (Mexico) Alicia Cervantes
- (Mexico) Charlyn Corral
- (Mexico) Karla Nieto
- (Mexico) Kiana Palacios
- (Paraguay) Lorena Alonso
- (Paraguay) Daysy Bareiro
- (Paraguay) Dahiana Bogarín
- (Paraguay) Ramona Martínez
- (United States) Kendall Bodak
- (United States) Katie Shea Collins
- (United States) Charlotte Kohler
- (United States) Grace Restovich

Source: Santiago2023
