= Franchesca Caniguán =

Chilean footballer (born 1999)

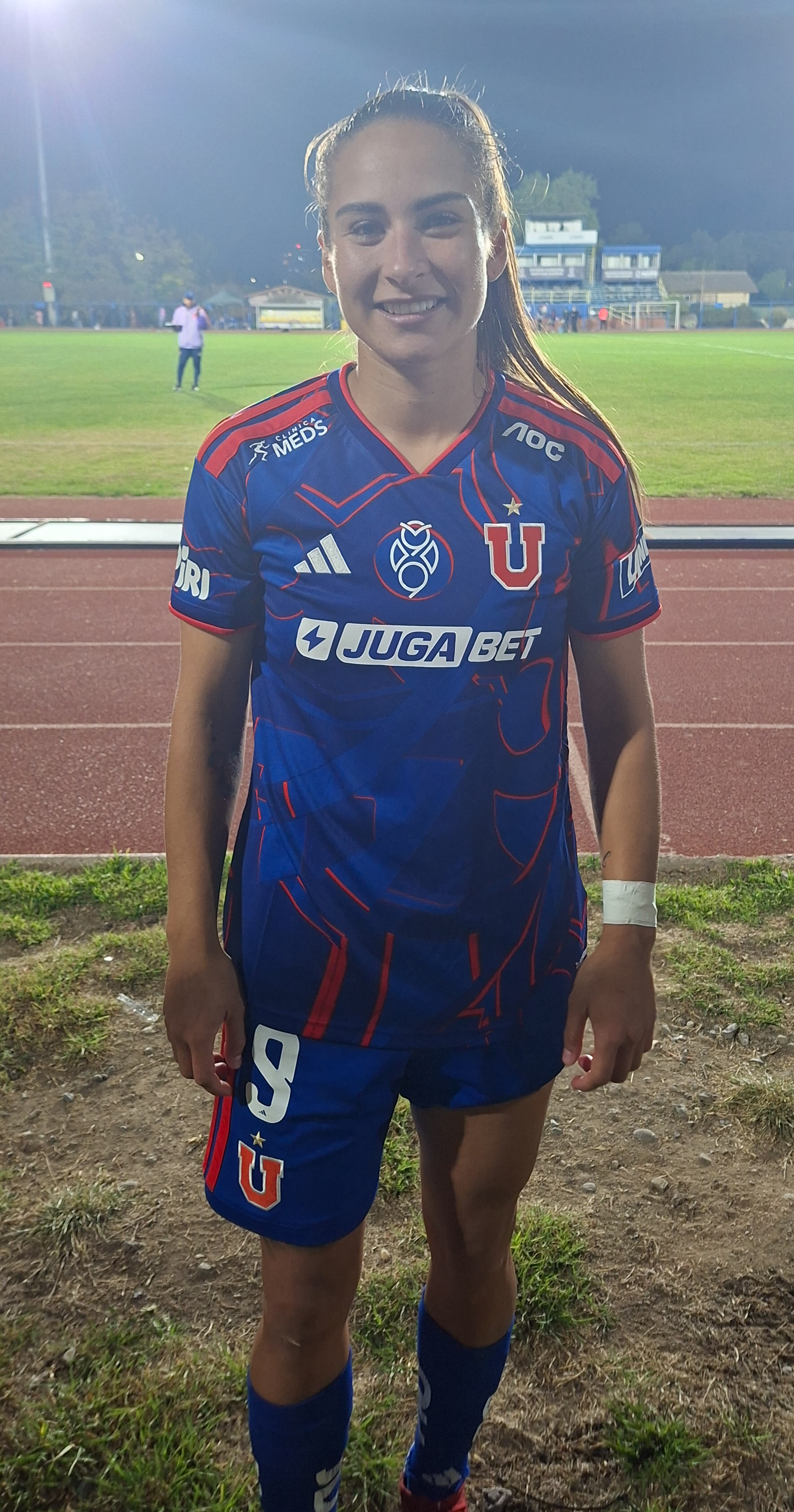

Personal information
- Full name: Franchesca Marlen Caniguán González
- Date of birth: 15 November 1999 (age 26)
- Place of birth: Talca, Chile
- Position: Forward

Team information
- Current team: Universidad de Chile
- Number: 9

Senior career*
| Years | Team | Apps | (Gls) |
| 2013–2018 | Rangers | | |
| 2019–2021 | Universidad de Concepción | | |
| 2022 | Fernández Vial | | |
| 2023– | Universidad de Chile | | |

International career
| 2019 | Chile (futsal) | | |
| 2023– | Chile | 1 | (0) |
Medal record
Women's football
Representing Chile
Pan American Games
| Silver medal – second place | 2023 Santiago | Team |
- * Club domestic league appearances and goals

Franchesca Marlen Caniguán González (born 15 November 1999) is a Chilean footballer who plays as a forward for Universidad de Chile and the Chile women's national team.

== Club career ==
Caniguán started her football career with Rangers de Talca in 2013, then transferred to Club Universidad de Concepción in 2019. In 2022, she signed with Fernandez Vial and helped the club to reach the semi-final of Chile women's championship. In 2023, Caniguán joined the University of Chile. She scored a crucial goal in Chile's Copa Libertadores Femenina qualification against Santiago Morning.

== International career ==
Caniguán made her senior debut for Chile women's national team in a friendly against New Zealand on 23 September 2023. She scored her first international goal against Jamaica in the Pan American Games 2023.

She represented Chile at the 2023 Pan American Games, where Chile won the silver medal.

Caniguán also represented the Chile national futsal team in the 2019 Copa América.

== International goals ==
Scores and results list Chile's goal tally first

| No. | Date | Venue | Opponent | Score | Result | Competition |
|---|---|---|---|---|---|---|
| 1. | 28 October 2023 | Estadio Elías Figueroa Brander, Valparaíso, Chile | Jamaica | 3–0 | 6–0 | 2023 Pan American Games |

== Honours ==
Chile

- Pan American Games Silver Medal: 2023

Individual

- Premios FutFem - Best Goal: 2022
