= Isidora Olave =

Chilean footballer

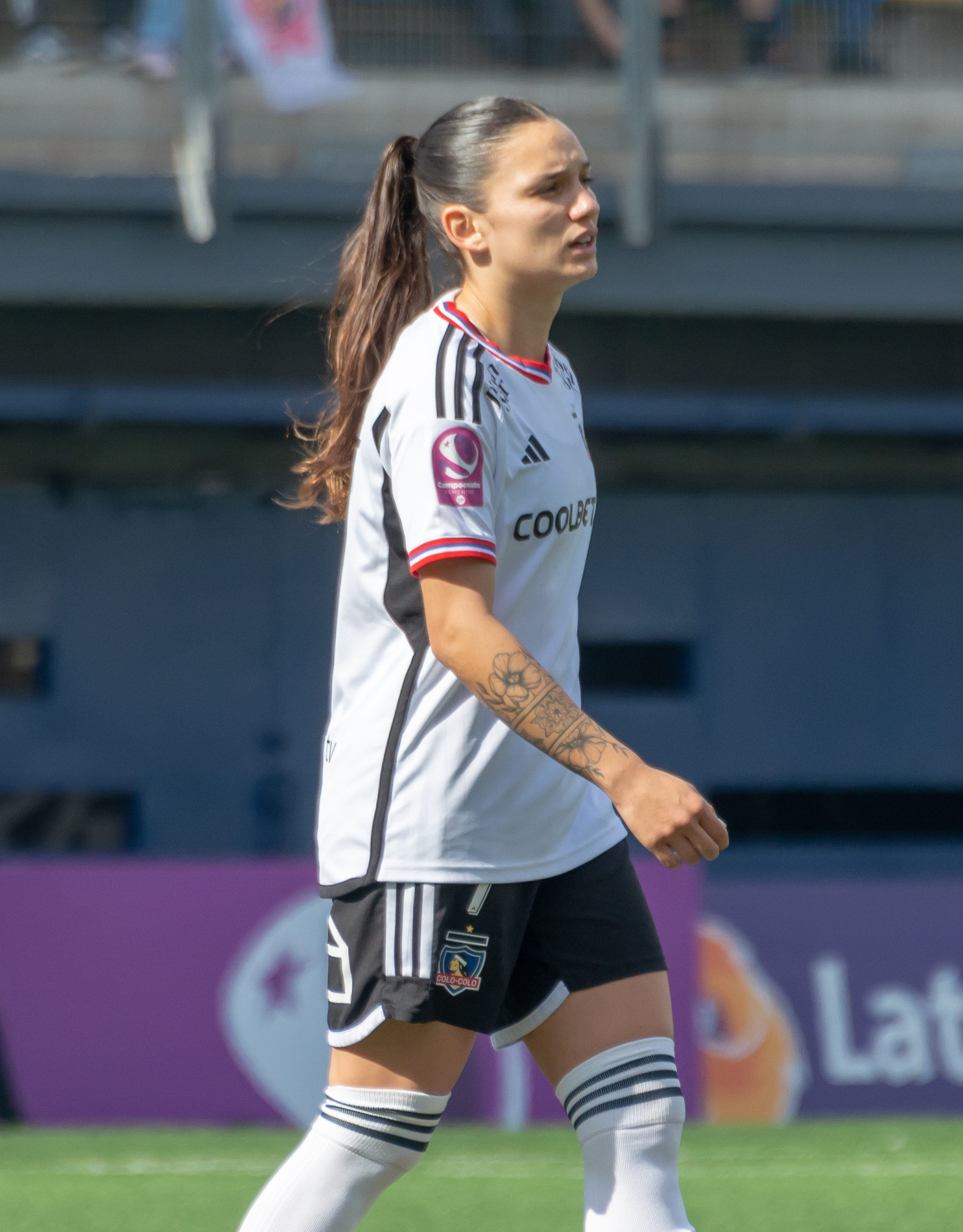
- Olave with Colo-Colo in 2023

Personal information
- Full name: Isidora Victoria Olave Araneda
- Date of birth: 23 April 2002 (age 24)
- Place of birth: Santiago, Chile
- Height: 1.57 m (5 ft 2 in)
- Position: Right winger

Team information
- Current team: Colo-Colo
- Number: 20

Youth career
- Audax Italiano
- Universidad de Chile
- 2013–2018: Colo-Colo

Senior career*
| Years | Team | Apps | (Gls) |
| 2019–2024 | Colo-Colo | | |
| 2024–2025 | Atlético San Luis | 29 | (3) |
| 2025– | Colo-Colo | | |

International career^{‡}
| 2018 | Chile U17 | | |
| 2018–2022 | Chile U20 | | |
| 2023– | Chile | 8 | (1) |
Medal record
Women's football
Representing Chile
Pan American Games
| Silver medal – second place | 2023 Santiago | Team |
- * Club domestic league appearances and goals ‡ National team caps and goals as of 6 November 2023

Isidora Victoria Olave Araneda (born 23 April 2002) is a Chilean footballer who plays as a right winger for Colo-Colo and the Chile women's national team. Mainly a forward, she can also operate as a right back.

== Club career ==
As a youth player, Olave was with Audax Italiano and Universidad de Chile before joining the Colo-Colo youth system at the age of eleven, after a trial in front of the coach José Letelier.

In 2018, Olave received a El Gráfico award as the best youth player at under-17 level, being promoted to the first team in 2019.

In 2021, she had surgery for a hip injury. Back to the activity, she took part of the Colo-Colo squad that won the league title the next season.

In the second half of 2024, Olave moved abroad and signed with Mexican club Atlético San Luis. She returned to Colo-Colo in June 2025.

== International career ==
She represented Chile at under-17 level in the 2018 South American Championship. At under-20 level, she represented Chile in three editions of the South American Championship: 2018, 2020 and 2022.

At senior level, she made her debut in a 4–0 loss against Argentina on 17 February 2023 in Auckland, New Zealand.

She represented Chile at the 2023 Pan American Games, where they won the silver medal.

== Career statistics ==
=== International goals ===
Scores and results list Chile's goal tally first

| No. | Date | Venue | Opponent | Score | Result | Competition |
|---|---|---|---|---|---|---|
| 1. | 28 October 2023 | Estadio Elías Figueroa Brander, Valparaíso, Chile | Jamaica | 4–0 | 6–0 | 2023 Pan American Games |

== Personal life ==
Olave is nicknamed Chichi since she was two years old.

In 2022, she began to study at INAF (National Football Institute) to become a football manager alongside fellows such as María José Urrutia, Elisa Durán, among others.

== Honours ==
Colo-Colo

- Primera División (5): 2022, 2023, 2024, 2025, 2026

Chile

- Pan American Games Silver Medal: 2023

Individual

- Premios El Gráfico - Best Female Under-17 Player: 2017
- Premios FutFem - Best Winger: 2023
