= Alejandría Godínez =

Mexican footballer (born 1994)

Personal information
- Full name: Alejandría Godínez Herrera
- Date of birth: 24 February 1994 (age 32)
- Place of birth: Acámbaro, Guanajuato, Mexico
- Height: 1.70 m (5 ft 7 in)
- Position: Goalkeeper

Team information
- Current team: Monterrey
- Number: 12

College career
Years	Team	Apps	(Gls)
2012–2015	DePaul Blue Demons	67	(0)

Senior career*
Years	Team	Apps	(Gls)
2017–2020	Pachuca	80	(0)
2020–2025	Monterrey	108	(0)
2024–2025	→ Cruz Azul (loan)	30	(0)
2025–2026	Cruz Azul	23	(0)
2026–	Monterrey	0	(0)

International career^{‡}
2019–	Mexico	2	(0)
Medal record
Women's football
Representing Mexico
Pan American Games
Gold medal – first place	2023 Santiago	Team
- * Club domestic league appearances and goals as of 1 February 2026 ‡ National team caps and goals as of 1 March 2019

Alejandría "Alex" Godínez Herrera (Note: In this Spanish name, the first or paternal surname is Godínez and the second or maternal family name is Herrera.) (born 24 February 1994) is a Mexican footballer who plays as a goalkeeper for Liga Femenil club Monterrey, and the Mexico women's national team.

== International career ==
Godínez made her senior debut for Mexico on 1 March 2019 in a 2–1 victory over Thailand.

Godínez was selected to represent Mexico at the 2023 Pan American Games held in Santiago, Chile, where the Mexican squad went undefeated to won the gold medal for the first time in their history at the Pan American Games, defeating Chile 1–0.
