= Yessenia López =

Chilean footballer (born 1990)

Paloma López
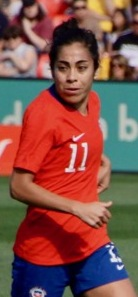
- López with Chile in 2018

Personal information
- Full name: Yessenia Andrea López López
- Date of birth: 20 October 1990 (age 36)
- Place of birth: Viña del Mar, Chile
- Height: 1.61 m (5 ft 3 1/2 in)
- Position: Midfielder

Team information
- Current team: Colo-Colo
- Number: 8

Senior career*
Years	Team	Apps	(Gls)
2009	Everton		
2010	Santos		
2010–2013	Everton		
2014–2016	Santiago Morning		
2017	Universidad de Chile		
2018	3B da Amazônia		
2018–2019	Sporting Huelva	23	(0)
2019	Colo-Colo		
2020–2023	Universidad de Chile		
2023–	Colo-Colo		

International career^{‡}
2011–2015	Chile (futsal)		
2017–	Chile	61	(7)
Medal record
Women's football
Representing Chile
Pan American Games
Silver medal – second place	2023 Santiago	Team
- * Club domestic league appearances and goals as of 01:25, 17 June 2019 (UTC) ‡ National team caps and goals as of 29 September 2023

Yessenia Andrea López López (born 20 October 1990), best known as Paloma López, is a Chilean footballer who plays as a midfielder for Colo-Colo and the Chile women's national team.

== International career ==
López scored two goals at the 2018 Copa América Femenina, where Chile qualified for a FIFA Women's World Cup for the first time in its history.

She represented Chile at the 2023 Pan American Games, where Chile won the silver medal.

López also represented the Chile national futsal team in the Copa América de Futsal Femenina in 2011 and 2015.

=== International goals ===
Scores and results list Chile's goal tally first

No.	Date	Venue	Opponent	Score	Result	Competition
1	12 April 2018	Estadio La Portada, La Serena, Chile	Peru	2–0	5–0	2018 Copa América Femenina
2	16 April 2018	Estadio La Portada, La Serena, Chile	Brazil	1–3	1–3	2018 Copa América Femenina
3	23 September 2023	Estadio Bicentenario de La Florida, Santiago, Chile	New Zealand	3–0	3–0	Friendly
4	28 October 2023	Estadio Elías Figueroa Brander, Valparaíso, Chile	Jamaica	2–0	6–0	2023 Pan American Games

== Honours ==
Universidad de Chile

- Primera División (1): 2021

Colo-Colo

- Primera División (4): 2023, 2024, 2025, 2026

Chile

- Copa América Runner-up: 2018
- Torneio Internacional de Futebol Feminino: 2019
- Turkish Women's Cup: 2020
- Pan American Games Silver Medal: 2023

Individual

- Premios Contragolpe - Best Midfielder: 2021
- Premios Contragolpe - Ideal Team: 2021
- Premios FutFem - Best Midfielder: 2022
- Primera División Ideal Team: 2024, 2025
