= Daniela Zamora =

Chilean footballer (born 1990)

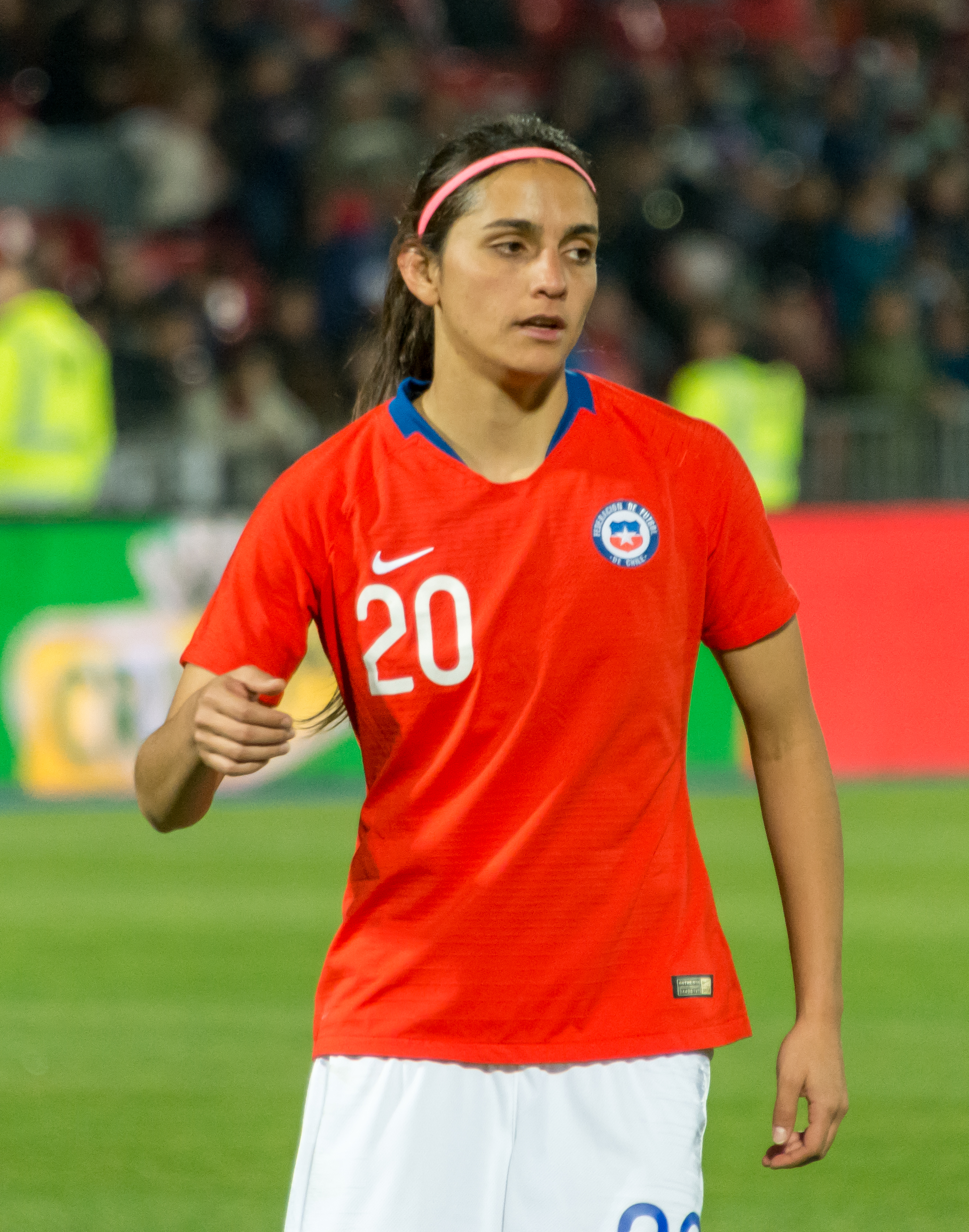

Personal information
- Full name: Daniela Paz Zamora Mancilla
- Date of birth: 13 November 1990 (age 35)
- Place of birth: Chile
- Height: 1.66 m (5 ft 5 in)
- Position: Forward

Team information
- Current team: Universidad de Chile
- Number: 15

Senior career*
Years	Team	Apps	(Gls)
2008	Unión La Calera		
2009	Universidad Católica		
2011–2014	Universidad de Chile		
2018–2021	Universidad de Chile		
2021	Djurgården	22	(2)
2022–	Universidad de Chile		

International career^{‡}
2008	Chile U20		
2009–	Chile	37	(5)
Medal record
Women's football
Representing Chile
Pan American Games
Silver medal – second place	2023 Santiago	Team
- * Club domestic league appearances and goals ‡ National team caps and goals as of 01:30, 17 June 2019 (UTC)

Daniela Paz Zamora Mancilla (born 13 November 1990) is a Chilean footballer who plays as a forward for Universidad de Chile and the Chile women's national team.

== International career ==
Zamora represented Chile at the 2023 Pan American Games, where Chile won the silver medal. After Christiane Endler returned to her club, Lyon, and retired from the national team, she became the team captain for the gold medal match against Mexico.

=== International goals ===
No.	Date	Venue	Opponent	Score	Result	Competition
1.	10 October 2022	Cancha Centenario No. 5, Mexico City, Mexico	Mexico	1–0	1–1	Friendly
2.	23 September 2023	Estadio Bicentenario de La Florida, Santiago, Chile	New Zealand	1–0	3–0	Friendly
3.	22 October 2023	Estadio Elías Figueroa Brander, Valparaíso, Chile	Paraguay	1–0	1–0	2023 Pan American Games

== Personal life ==
Zamora and her partner, Paz, have a son called Tomás who was born in September 2024.

== Honours ==
Chile

- Pan American Games Silver Medal: 2023
