= Karla Nieto =

Mexican footballer (born 1995)

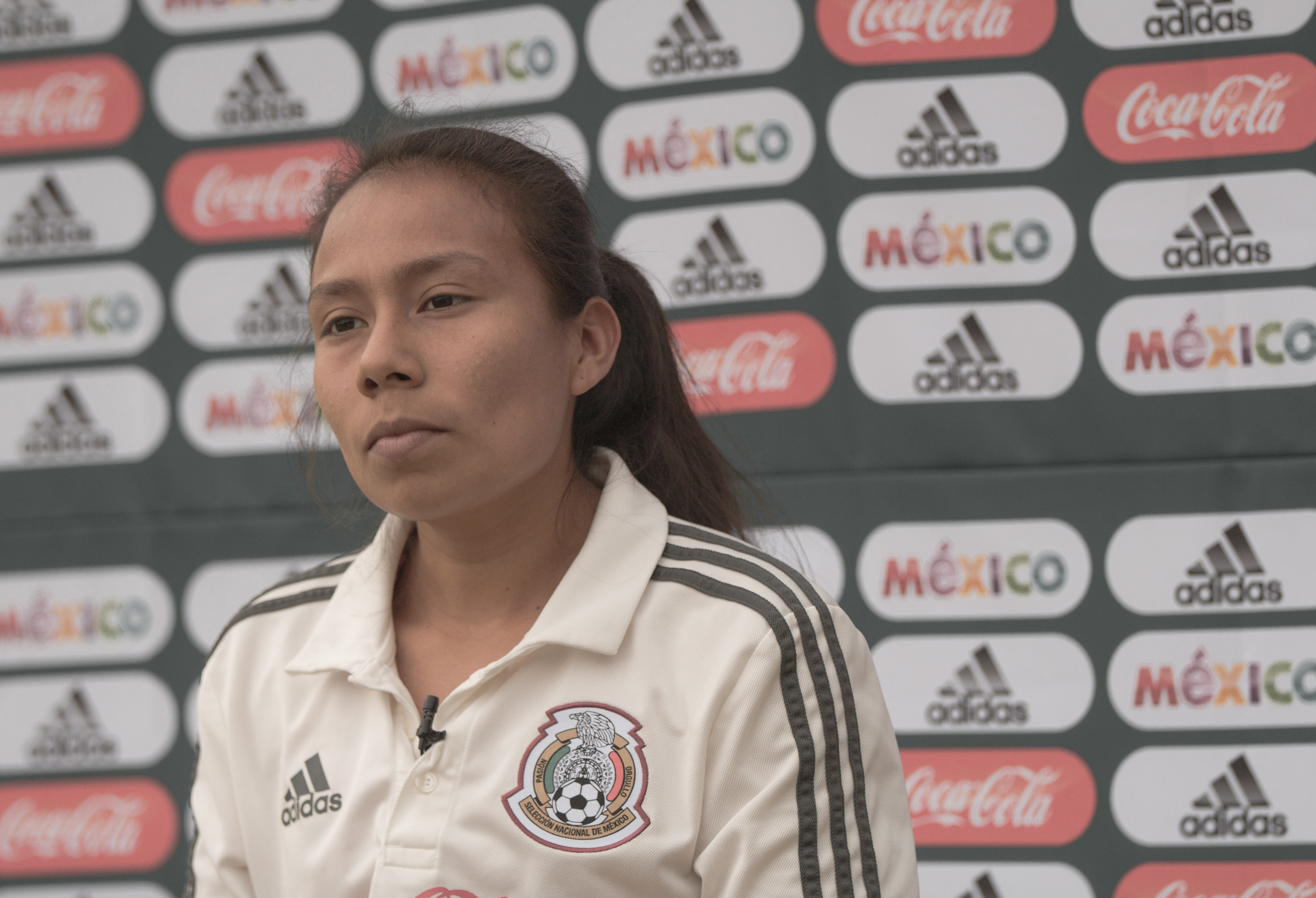

Personal information
- Full name: Karla Paola Nieto Castillo
- Date of birth: 9 January 1995 (age 31)
- Place of birth: Mexico City, Mexico
- Height: 1.55 m (5 ft 1 in)
- Position: Defensive midfielder

Team information
- Current team: Pachuca
- Number: 6

Youth career
- Ballenas Galeana
- Leonas Morelos

Senior career*
Years	Team	Apps	(Gls)
2017–	Pachuca	129	(10)

International career^{‡}
2014–2015	Mexico U20		
2015–	Mexico	55	(1)
Medal record
Women's football
Representing Mexico
Pan American Games
Gold medal – first place	2023 Santiago	Team
Central American and Caribbean Games
Gold medal – first place	2023 San Salvador
- * Club domestic league appearances and goals as of 20 November 2017 ‡ National team caps and goals as of 19 February 2025

Karla Paola Nieto Castillo (born 9 January 1995) is a Mexican professional football midfielder who currently plays for Pachuca of the Liga MX Femenil.

== Club career ==
Prior to turning professional, Nieto played in the amateur Liga Mexicana de Fútbol Femenil with Ballenas Galeana and Leonas Morelos.

== International career ==
Nieto was selected to represent Mexico at the 2023 Pan American Games held in Santiago, Chile, where the Mexican squad went undefeated to won the gold medal for the first time in their history at the Pan American Games, defeating Chile 1–0.

== International goals ==
No.	Date	Venue	Opponent	Score	Result	Competition
1.	22 October 2023	Estadio Elías Figueroa Brander, Valparaíso, Chile	Jamaica	2–0	7–0	2023 Pan American Games

== Honours and achievements ==
Mexico

- Pan American Games: 2023, gold medal

Individual

- Liga MX Femenil Team of The Season: Apertura 2017
