= Yastin Jiménez =

Chilean footballer (born 2000)

Personal information
- Full name: Yastin Fabiola Jiménez Donoso
- Date of birth: 17 October 2000 (age 26)
- Place of birth: Santiago, Chile
- Height: 1.62 m (5 ft 4 in)
- Position: Midfielder

Team information
- Current team: Colo-Colo
- Number: 6

Senior career*
Years	Team	Apps	(Gls)
2018–	Colo-Colo		

International career^{‡}
2018–2020	Chile U20	4	(0)
2019–	Chile	19	(0)
Medal record
Women's football
Representing Chile
Pan American Games
Silver medal – second place	2023 Santiago	Team
- * Club domestic league appearances and goals ‡ National team caps and goals as of 30 August 2023

Yastin Fabiola Jiménez Donoso (born 17 October 2000) is a Chilean footballer who plays as a midfielder for Colo-Colo and the Chile women's national team.

== International career ==
Jiménez represented the Chile under-20 team in the South American Championships of 2018 and 2020 and the 2018 South American Games. She made her senior debut for Chile on 29 August 2019 in a 1–0 friendly win against Costa Rica. She later represented Chile at the 2023 Pan American Games, where Chile won the silver medal.

=== International goals ===
Scores and results list Chile's goal tally first

No.	Date	Venue	Opponent	Score	Result	Competition
1.	28 October 2023	Estadio Elías Figueroa Brander, Valparaíso, Chile	Jamaica	1–0	6–0	2023 Pan American Games

== Honours ==
Colo-Colo

- Primera División (5): 2022, 2023, 2024, 2025, 2026

Chile

- Torneio Internacional de Futebol Feminino: 2019
- Pan American Games Silver Medal: 2023

Individual

- Premios FutFem - Best Midfielder: 2023
- Primera División Ideal Team: 2024, 2025
