= Katie Shea Collins =

American soccer player (born 2005)

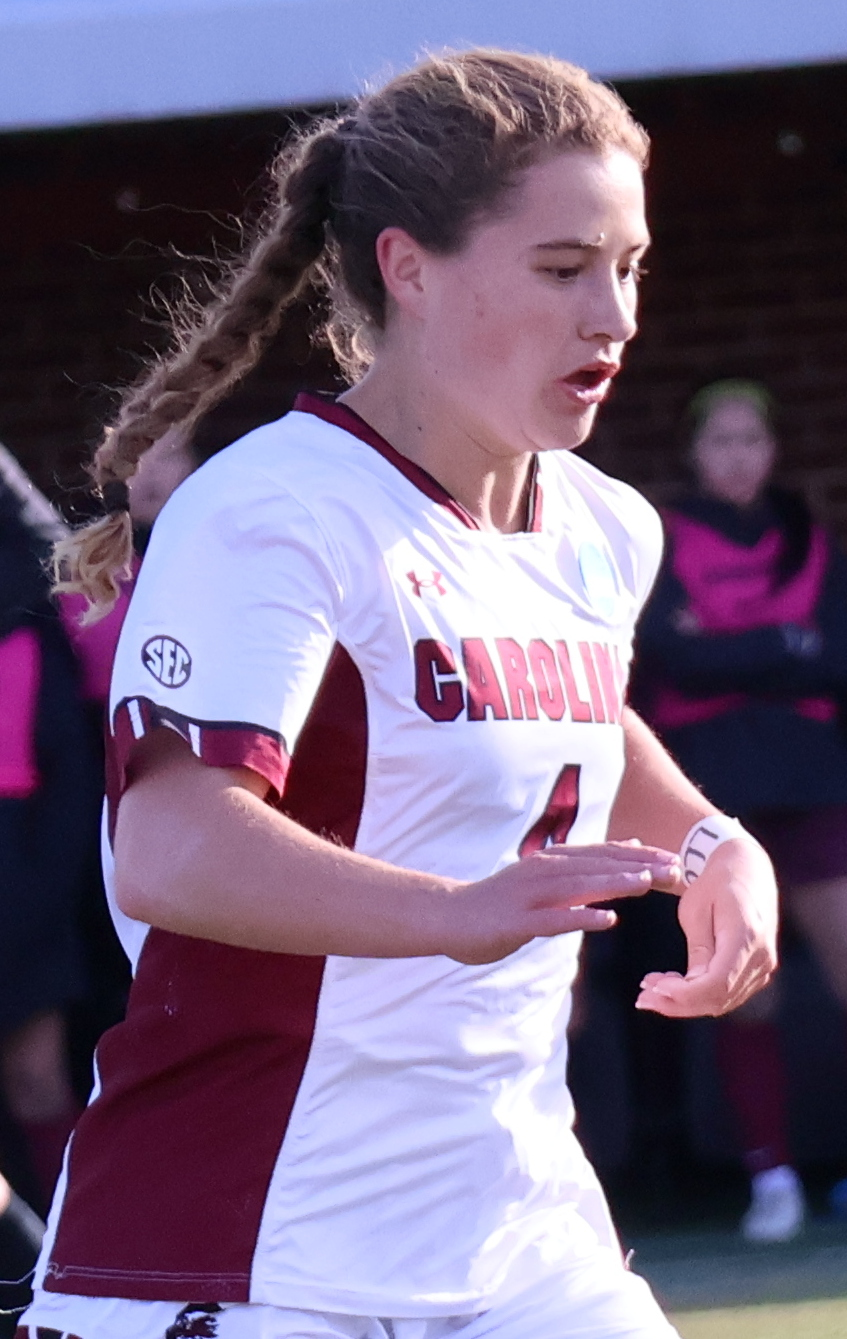
- Collins with South Carolina in 2024

Personal information
- Full name: Kathleen Shea Collins
- Date of birth: October 28, 2005 (age 21)
- Height: 5 ft 3 in (1.60 m)
- Position: Forward

Team information
- Current team: Duke Blue Devils

Youth career
- Tennessee United
- Tampa Bay United
- Tennessee SC

College career
Years	Team	Apps	(Gls)
2024–2025	South Carolina Gamecocks	38	(23)
2026–	Duke Blue Devils	12	(6)

International career^{‡}
2023	United States U-19	5	(1)
2024–	United States U-20	2	(0)
- ‡ National team caps and goals as of June 3, 2024

Kathleen Shea Collins (born October 28, 2005) is an American college soccer player who plays as a forward for the Duke Blue Devils. She previously played for the South Carolina Gamecocks, earning third-team All-American honors in 2025. She won bronze with the United States U-19 team at the 2023 Pan American Games.

== Early life ==
Collins grew up in Gallatin, Tennessee, the daughter of Kevin and Nina Collins, and has a twin brother, Patrick. She started playing soccer at the local YMCA at a young age. She competed with her brother in multiple sports growing up, including football, basketball and played soccer on boys' and girls' teams. She played club soccer for Tennessee United SC, Tampa Bay United SC, and Tennessee SC, earning ECNL All-American honors in 2022.

Collins attended Pope Saint John Paul II Preparatory School, where she became the all-time top scorer with 106 goals and 31 assists. Her standout performance started bringing more students to games when she was a freshman. In her junior season in 2022, she broke a school record with 30 goals in just 11 games. She surpassed that mark in her senior season in 2023, scoring 44 goals and 6 assists (90% of the team's offense), and was named the Tennessee Gatorade Player of the Year and United Soccer Coaches All-American.

== College career ==
Collins scored a hat trick in her debut for the South Carolina Gamecocks as a freshman in 2024. In the NCAA tournament, she scored four goals in two games including a second hat trick. She finished her freshman season with 13 goals in 19 games, second on the team after Catherine Barry. She was named second-team All-SEC and TopDrawerSoccer first-team Freshman Best XI. In 2025, she led the Gamecocks with 10 goals in 19 games, including six game winners. She earned first-team All-SEC and third-team All-American honors, but lost both postseason games. She entered the NCAA transfer portal after her sophomore season. She transferred to the Duke Blue Devils.

== International career ==
Collins was first called into the United States youth national team at the under-17 level in 2021. She debuted at the under-19 level at the 2023 Pan American Games, where they faced other countries' senior teams. She scored one goal and appeared in all five games as the United States won a bronze medal. She played for the under-20 team ahead of the 2024 FIFA U-20 Women's World Cup and traveled with the team for training in the run-up to the tournament in Colombia.

== Honors and awards ==
United States U19

- Pan American Games bronze medal: 2023

Individual

- Third-team All-American: 2025
- First-team All-SEC: 2025
- Second-team All-SEC: 2024
- Third-team All-ACC: 2026
