= Amalia Villarreal =

American soccer player (born 2006)

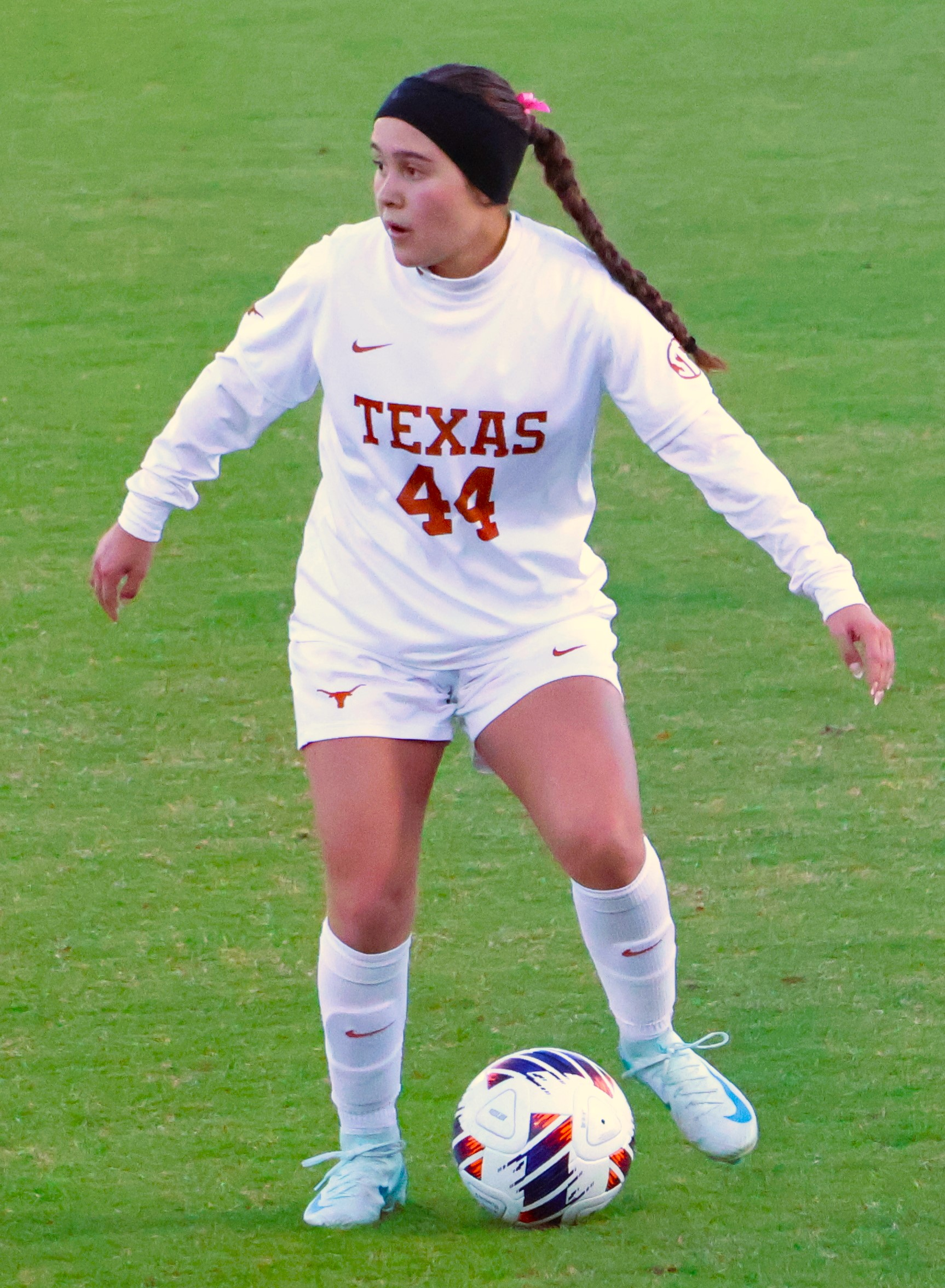
- Villarreal with Texas in 2024

Personal information
- Full name: Amalia Martina Villarreal
- Date of birth: March 27, 2006 (age 20)
- Height: 5 ft 2 in (1.57 m)
- Position: Forward

Team information
- Current team: Texas Longhorns
- Number: 44

Youth career
- Michigan Jaguars
- Solar SC

College career
Years	Team	Apps	(Gls)
2024–	Texas Longhorns	57	(25)

International career^{‡}
2022	United States U-17	14	(9)
2023	United States U-19	5	(4)
2024–	United States U-20	1	(0)
- ‡ National team caps and goals as of June 3, 2024

Amalia Martina Villarreal (born March 27, 2006) is an American college soccer player who plays as a forward for the Texas Longhorns. She was named the SEC Freshman of the Year in 2024. She won bronze with the United States U-19 team at the 2023 Pan American Games.

== Early life ==
Villarreal grew up in Lansing, Michigan, the older of two daughters born to Gretchen and Mario Villarreal. Her father played college football and baseball at the University of Olivet in Michigan. Villarreal played multiple sports growing up, including baseball, basketball, flag football, gymnastics, karate, and soccer. Her father coached her first soccer team, an indoor boys' team, but she was eventually prohibited from playing with them because she was a girl.

Villarreal joined Novi-based club Michigan Jaguars FC at age nine after playing for local teams DeWitt SC and SBC Chill. She helped lead the Girls Academy Jaguars to the under-13 national title game. She also played for the Texas-based ECNL club Solar SC after Michigan sports went on pause during the COVID-19 pandemic. Villarreal attended Lansing Catholic for one year, where she ran cross country and track, before taking online classes at Sexton High School, where she graduated in 2024. She committed to the University of Texas at Austin in her senior year.

== College career ==
Villarreal scored 10 goals and added 8 assists in 24 games in her freshman season with the Texas Longhorns in 2024. She made her first start in a game when Trinity Byars suffered a season-ending knee injury, after which Villarreal held a starting position for the rest of the season, helping Texas win the SEC tournament. She was named SEC Freshman of the Year and second-team All-SEC at the end of the season. She scored 8 goals with 2 assists in 17 games as a sophomore in 2025, earning second-team All-SEC honors, a bright spot in a down year for Texas.

== International career ==
Villarreal was invited to virtual training with the United States national under-16 team in 2021 and called into camp with the under-17 team later that year. At age 16, she made her competitive international debut at the 2022 CONCACAF Women's U-17 Championship, where she helped the United States win the tournament as the team's joint top scorer with eight goals and added five assists. She scored five times in a 13–0 win over Puerto Rico in the group stage, tying the national team record for goals in one game. She was included on the roster for the 2022 FIFA U-17 Women's World Cup. She scored the tying goal in a 1–1 draw to Nigeria in the quarterfinals, where the United States lost on penalties. The next year, Villarreal helped the under-19 team win bronze at the 2023 Pan American Games, where they faced other countries' senior sides. She led the team with four goals, including the opening score in a 2–0 win over Argentina in the third-place match.

== Honors and awards ==
Texas Longhorns

- SEC women's soccer tournament: 2024

United States U19

- Pan American Games bronze medal: 2023

Individual

- First-team All-SEC: 2026
- Second-team All-SEC: 2024, 2025
- SEC Freshman of the Year: 2024
