= Emeri Adames =

American soccer player (born 2006)

- Adames with the Seattle Reign in 2026

Personal information
- Full name: Emeri Kate Adames
- Date of birth: April 3, 2006 (age 20)
- Height: 5 ft 5 in (1.65 m)
- Position: Right winger

Team information
- Current team: Seattle Reign
- Number: 7

Youth career
- Dallas Texans
- Solar SC

Senior career*
Years	Team	Apps	(Gls)
2024–	Seattle Reign	60	(7)

International career^{‡}
2022	United States U-17	8	(2)
2023	United States U-19	5	(3)
2024–	United States U-20	22	(3)
2025–	United States U-23	2	(1)
Medal record
Women's soccer
Pan American Games
Bronze medal – third place	2023 Santiago	Team
FIFA U-20 Women's World Cup
Bronze medal – third place	Colombia 2024
- * Club domestic league appearances and goals as of 16:30, November 8, 2026 (UTC) ‡ National team caps and goals as of 00:06, September 17, 2026 (UTC)

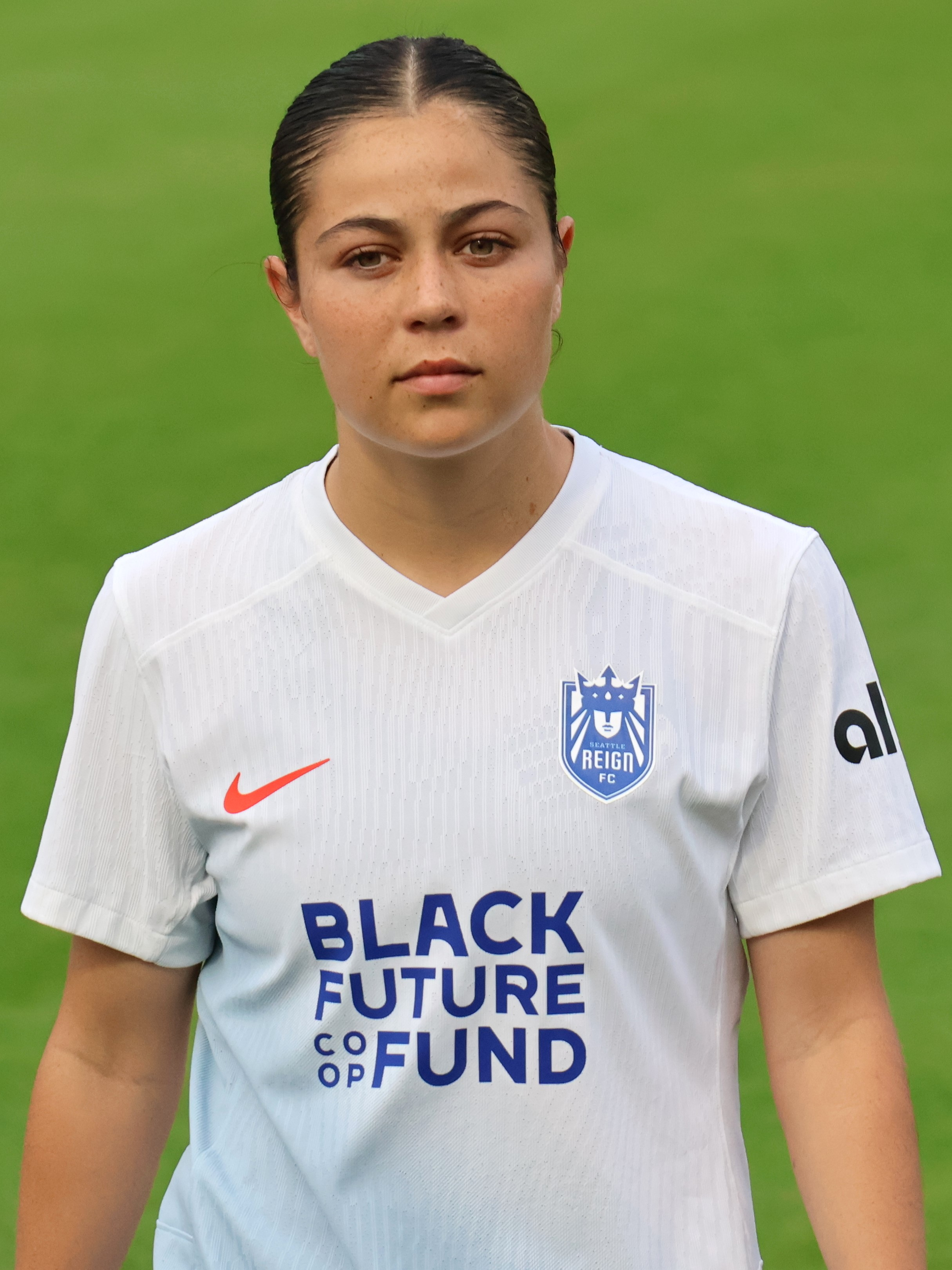
Adames with the Seattle Reign in 2024

Emeri Kate Adames (born April 3, 2006) is an American professional soccer player who plays as a right winger for Seattle Reign FC of the National Women's Soccer League (NWSL). She signed with the Reign at age 17 in 2024. She won bronze medals as a youth international at the 2023 Pan American Games and the 2024 FIFA U-20 Women's World Cup.

== Early life ==
Adames was raised in Dallas, Texas. She attended Life High School in Waxahachie, Texas, for two years, before transferring to the University of Texas at Austin High School. She played soccer and ran cross country and track at Life High School, setting a school record with 47 goals as a freshman in 2021. She played club soccer for Dallas Texans SC and Solar SC, earning ECNL All-American honors three times with the latter. She committed to play college soccer for the North Carolina Tar Heels during her junior year. She was ranked by TopDrawerSoccer as the sixth-best prospect in her class.

== Club career ==
Adames began training with Seattle Reign FC in the National Women's Soccer League (NWSL) preseason in 2024. She soon decided to give up her college eligibility and sign her first professional contract with the club. On March 13, 2024, the Reign announced she had signed a three-year deal under the NWSL's Under-18 Entry Mechanism, with a one-year option triggered upon her first appearance. She took the 47 jersey number in emulation of Manchester City player Phil Foden.

On March 17, 2024, Adames made her professional debut in the first game of the season, replacing Bethany Balcer as a stoppage-time substitute in a 1–0 win over the Washington Spirit. On May 25, she scored her first professional goal shortly before the final whistle in a 3–2 loss to the Washington Spirit. On August 25, she celebrated the Reign's 1–0 winner against the North Carolina Courage by emulating the outstretched-arms pose of her childhood idol Megan Rapinoe, whose jersey was being retired by the Reign that night. She finished her rookie season with 2 goals in 24 appearances in all competitions.

On March 15, 2025, Adames began the season scoring the 1–1 equalizer off the bench against Gotham FC. On June 6, she scored the late 2–1 winner over the San Diego Wave from just inside the box. Two weeks later, she scored twice in a 4–1 win over the Utah Royals, earning an NWSL Team of the Month selection after recording three goals in June. On August 10, she scored her first Cascadia rivalry goal, opening the scoring in a 4–2 defeat to the Portland Thorns. In the playoff quarterfinals, the Reign lost 2–0 to the Orlando Pride. Leading the club in scoring (alongside captain Jess Fishlock), she finished the season with 6 goals in 22 games despite starting only half her appearances.

Adames changed her jersey number from 47 to 7 before the next season. On May 10, 2026, she made her 50th career regular-season appearance, becoming the then third-youngest NWSL player to the mark after Olivia Moultrie and Kennedy Fuller.

== International career ==
Adames began training with United States youth national team at the under-14 level. She played in all four games for the under-17 team at the 2022 FIFA U-17 Women's World Cup. She won bronze with national under-19 at the 2023 Pan American Games, where they played against other countries' senior sides. She scored three goals at the tournament, including in their semifinal loss to Chile. She started every game for the under-20 team at the 2024 FIFA U-20 Women's World Cup, helping the United States finish in third place. In the group stage, she provided three assists in the first half of their 7–0 win over Paraguay. She had four assists in the tournament overall, the most by an American since Heather O'Reilly's seven in 2002.

Adames was called up to the under-23 team, training concurrently with the senior national team, in 2025. She started all four games for the under-20 team at the 2026 FIFA U-20 Women's World Cup in Poland, scoring one goal and recording three assists. In the round of 16, she had the only penalty saved in their shootout loss to Brazil.
