= Estadio Elías Figueroa Brander =

Multi-purpose stadium in Valparaíso, Chile

- Playa Ancha
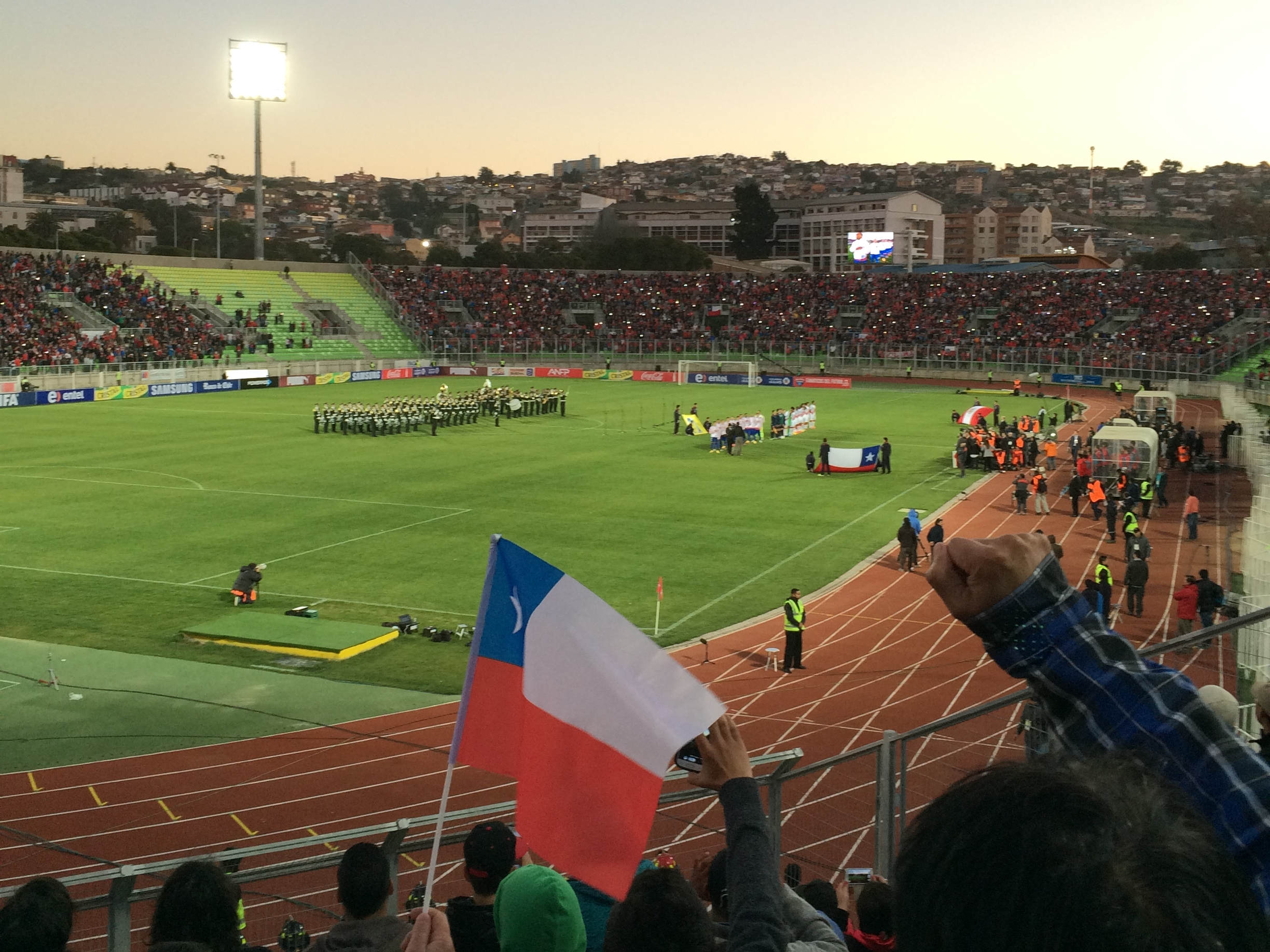
- Interactive map of Estadio Elías Figueroa Brander
- Full name: Estadio Elías Figueroa Brander de Valparaíso
- Former names: Estadio Municipal de Valparaíso (1931 − 2005), Estadio Regional Chiledeportes (2005 − 2012)
- Location: Valparaíso, Chile
- Coordinates: 33.022°S 71.640°W
- Owner: Chiledeportes
- Capacity: 20,575
- Surface: grass
- Field size: 105 x 68 m

Construction
- Opened: December 25, 1931
- Reopened: 19 February 2014
- Cost: $19.000.000.000
- Architects: Gerardo Marambio, Claudio Aceituno, Claudio Palavecino, Mauricio Carrion

Tenant
- Santiago Wanderers

Estadio Elías Figueroa Brander (Spanish pronunciation: [eˈli.as fiɣeˈɾoa] | in English: Elías Figueroa Brander Stadium), formerly known as Estadio Regional Chiledeportes and Estadio Municipal de Valparaíso, is a multi-purpose stadium in Valparaíso, Chile. It is commonly known as Estadio Playa Ancha, due to the suburb where it is located. It is currently used mostly for football matches and is the home stadium of Santiago Wanderers. The stadium holds 20,575, was built in 1931 and renovated in 2014.

The highest attendance at the Elías Figueroa, then "Municipal de Valparaiso", was 23,109 for a Primera Division league match between Santiago Wanderers and Colo-Colo (0-2) on October 25, 1953.

In July 2022, the venue was confirmed to host the women's football tournament at the 2023 Pan American Games.

In July 2024, it was confirmed as one of the 5 host venues for the 2025 FIFA U-20 World Cup.
