= 2025 Colo-Colo season =

Colo-Colo
2025 season
- Manager: Jorge Almirón
- Stadium: Estadio Monumental David Arellano
- Primera División: 8th
- Copa Chile: Group stage
- Supercopa de Chile: Runner-up
- Copa Libertadores: Group stage
- Average home league attendance: 29,359
Home colours	Away colours

The 2025 season was Club Social y Deportivo Colo-Colo's 93rd season in the Chilean Primera División. Colo-Colo was the defending champion having won their 34th title the prior season.

The club also participated in the Copa Chile, Supercopa de Chile, and Copa Libertadores.

== Squad ==
=== First team ===
As of 10 March 2025

Note: Flags indicate national team as defined under FIFA eligibility rules; some limited exceptions apply. Players may hold more than one non-FIFA nationality.

No.	Pos.	Nation	Player
1	GK	CHI	Brayan Cortés
2	DF	CHI	Jonathan Villagra
3	DF	CHI	Daniel Gutiérrez
4	DF	URU	Alan Saldivia
5	MF	CHI	Víctor Méndez
6	DF	CHI	Sebastián Vegas
7	MF	CHI	Francisco Marchant
8	MF	CHI	Esteban Pavez
9	FW	ARG	Javier Correa
10	MF	ARG	Claudio Aquino
11	FW	CHI	Marcos Bolados
12	GK	CHI	Eduardo Villanueva
13	DF	CHI	Bruno Gutiérrez
14	FW	CHI	Cristian Zavala

No.	Pos.	Nation	Player
15	DF	SYR	Emiliano Amor
16	DF	CHI	Óscar Opazo
17	DF	CHI	Cristian Riquelme
19	FW	URU	Salomón Rodríguez
20	FW	CHI	Alexander Oroz
21	DF	CHI	Erick Wiemberg
22	DF	CHI	Mauricio Isla
23	MF	CHI	Arturo Vidal
24	FW	CHI	Leandro Hernández
25	MF	CHI	Tomás Alarcón
27	MF	CHI	Diego Plaza
30	GK	CHI	Fernando de Paul
32	FW	CHI	Lucas Cepeda
34	MF	CHI	Vicente Pizarro

==== Transfers In ====
Note: Flags indicate national team as defined under FIFA eligibility rules; some limited exceptions apply. Players may hold more than one non-FIFA nationality.

No. / Pos. / Nation / Player; — / MF / ARG / Claudio Aquino (from Vélez Sarsfield)	No. / Pos. / Nation / Player; — / FW / URU / Salomón Rodríguez (from Godoy Cruz)

==== Transfers Out ====
Note: Flags indicate national team as defined under FIFA eligibility rules; some limited exceptions apply. Players may hold more than one non-FIFA nationality.

No.	Pos.	Nation	Player
5	MF	CHI	Leonardo Gil (to Huracán)
6	MF	CHI	Cesar Fuentes (Transfer to Deportes Iquique)
7	FW	CHI	Carlos Palacios (Transfer to Boca Juniors)
15	DF	SYR	Emiliano Amor (Released)
19	MF	ARG	Gonzalo Castellani (Released)
29	FW	PAR	Guillermo Paiva (back to Olimpia)

No.	Pos.	Nation	Player
31	GK	CHI	Omar Carabalí (to O'Higgins)
33	DF	CHI	Ramiro González (to Everton)
37	DF	URU	Maximiliano Falcón (to Inter Miami)
--	FW	CHI	Juan Carlos Gaete (to Cobresal)
--	FW	PAR	Darío Lezcano (Released)

== Competitions ==
=== Primera División ===
==== League Table ====
Pos	Team	Pld	W	D	L	GF	GA	GD	Pts	Qualification or relegation
6	Palestino	30	14	7	9	42	31	+11	49	Qualification for Copa Sudamericana first stage
7	Cobresal	30	14	5	11	38	38	0	47	Qualification for Copa Sudamericana first stage
8	Colo-Colo	30	12	8	10	46	36	+10	44	
9	Huachipato	30	12	7	11	43	42	+1	43	Qualification for Copa Libertadores second stage (Note: Huachipato qualified for the Copa Libertadores second stage by winning the 2025 Copa Chile.)
10	Ñublense	30	8	9	13	31	40	−9	33	

Source: Campeonato Chileno, Soccerway
Rules for classification: 1) Points, 2) Playoff game (only if needed to decide championship between two teams), 3) Goal difference, 4) Matches won, 5) Goals for, 6) Away goals for, 7) Red cards, 8) Yellow cards, 9) Drawing of lots.

==== Matches ====
16 February 2025 1	Deportes La Serena	1–3	Colo-Colo	La Serena
12:00	Gallegos 79'	Report	Pizarro 33'; Vegas 72'; Correa 80'	Stadium: La Portada; Attendance: 9,936; Referee: Fernando Vejar

24 February 2025 2	Colo-Colo	0–1	O'Higgins	Macul
20:00		Report	Rabello 67'	Stadium: Monumental; Attendance: 36,545; Referee: Rodrigo Carvajal

2 March 2025 3	Huachipato	2–1	Colo-Colo	Talcahuano
12:00	Caroca 85'; Briceño 90+9'	Report	Aquino 59' (pen.)	Stadium: Huachipato-CAP; Attendance: 5,199; Referee: Felipe González Alveal

9 March 2025 4	Colo-Colo	2–0	Everton	Macul
16:30	Lucas Cepeda 43' (pen.), 73'	Report		Stadium: Monumental; Referee: Manuel Vergara Rodriguez

27 March 2025 6	Colo-Colo	1–1	Palestino	Macul
18:15	Oroz 64'	Report	Marabel 21'	Stadium: Monumental; Referee: Felipe Gonzalez Alveal

26 April 2025 9	Colo-Colo	2–0	Coquimbo	Macul
16:00	Bolados 13', 43'	Report		Stadium: Monumental; Referee: José Cabero Rebolledo

2 May 2025 10	Limache	1–0	Colo-Colo	Quillota
18:00	Castro 34'	Report		Stadium: Municipal Lucio Fariña Fernández; Referee: Cristián Garay Reyes

19 May 2025 11	Colo-Colo	2–2	Ñublense	Macul
	Aquino 45+4'; Correa 70'	Report	Sosa 7'; Plaza 16'	Stadium: Monumental; Referee: Gastón Philippe

24 May 2025 12	Colo-Colo	4–1	Unión Española	Macul
17:30	Correa 7'; Pizarro 21'; Vidal 25' (pen.); Aquino 58' (pen.)	Report	Gutiérrez 3' (o.g.)	Stadium: Monumental; Referee: Franco Jiménez

1 June 2025 13	Unión La Calera	0–1	Colo-Colo	La Calera
17:30		Report	Vidal 45+3' (pen.)	Stadium: Estadio Nicolás Chahuán; Referee: Benjamin Saravia Retamal

12 June 2025 8	Deportes Iquique	2–2	Colo-Colo	Iquique
20:00	Saborit 36'; Vidal 56' (o.g.)	Report	Correa 53'; Oroz 59'	Stadium: Estadio Tierra de Campeones; Referee: José Cabero Rebolledo

17 June 2025 14	Colo-Colo	4–0	Cobresal	Macul
18:00	Vegas 27'; Correa 55', 75'; Lucas Cepeda 85' (pen.)	Report		Stadium: Monumental; Referee: Gaston Philippe

22 June 2025 15	Audax Italiano	2–1	Colo-Colo	Santiago
15:00	Espejo 66'; Valencia 88'	Report	Marchant 78'	Stadium: Estadio Bicentenario de La Florida; Referee: Fernando Vejar Díaz

6 July 2025 5	Universidad Católica	2–0	Colo-Colo	Santiago
17:00	González 70'; Corral 90+5'	Report		Stadium: Estadio Santa Laura; Referee: Mathias Riquelme

12 July 2025 7	Universidad de Chile	2–1	Colo-Colo	Santiago
17:00	Aránguiz 33', 56'	Report	Aquino 39'	Stadium: Estadio Nacional Julio Martínez Prádanos

19 July 2025 16	Colo-Colo	2–1	Deportes La Serena	Macul
15:00	Pizarro 68', 81'	Report	Henríquez 53'	Stadium: Monumental; Referee: Jose Cabero

27 July 2025 17	O'Higgins	1–1	Colo-Colo	San Fernando
12:30	Romero 51'	Report	Correa 27'	Stadium: Estadio Jorge Silva; Referee: Nicolás Gamboa

3 August 2025 18	Colo-Colo	2–2	Huachipato	Macul
15:00	Correa 52', 79'	Report	Gutiérrez 32'; Martínez 68'	Stadium: Monumental; Referee: Diego Flores Seguel

10 August 2025 19	Everton	1–1	Colo-Colo	Viña del Mar
12:30	Sosa 90+9' (pen.)	Report	Méndez 33'	Stadium: Estadio Sausalito; Referee: Felipe González Alveal

16 August 2025 20	Colo-Colo	1–4	Universidad Católica	Macul
15:00	Wiemberg 43'	Report	Cuevas 1', 46'; Asta-Buruaga 12'; Zampedri 33'	Stadium: Monumental; Referee: Cristián Garay Reyes

22 August 2025 21	Palestino	0–0	Colo-Colo	Santiago
15:00		Report		Stadium: Estadio Municipal de La Cisterna; Referee: Hector Jona Gamboa

31 August 2025 22	Colo-Colo	1–0	Universidad de Chile	Macul
15:00	Pizarro 81'	Report		Stadium: Monumental; Referee: Cristián Garay Reyes

26 September 2025 23	Colo-Colo	4–0	Deportes Iquique	Macul
18:00	Bolados 38'; Isla 64'; Aquino 81'; Vidal 86'	Report		Stadium: Monumental; Referee: Juan Lara Luco

19 October 2025 24	Coquimbo	1–0	Colo-Colo	Coquimbo
11:30	Cabrera 53'	Report		Stadium: Estadio Municipal Francisco Sánchez Rumoroso; Referee: Cristian Galaz Sepulveda

27 October 2025 25	Colo-Colo	2–2	Limache	Macul
17:00	Aquino 17'; Lucas Cepeda 69'	Report	Castro 83'; Hernandez 90+6'	Stadium: Monumental; Referee: Diego Flores Seguel

1 November 2025 26	Ñublense	0–1	Colo-Colo	Chillán
17:00	Pizarro 55'	Report		Stadium: Estadio Municipal Nelson Oyarzún Arenas; Referee: Mario Salvo Sepúlveda

8 November 2025 27	Unión Española	1–2	Colo-Colo	Independencia
15:00	Aránguiz 43'	Report	Correa 28'; Alarcón 79'	Stadium: Estadio Santa Laura; Referee: Hector Jona Gamboa

23 November 2025 28	Colo-Colo	4–1	Unión La Calera	Macul
20:30	Lucas Cepeda 8'; Correa 16'; Méndez 25'; Rodríguez 85'	Report	Mesías 55'	Stadium: Monumental; Attendance: 29,664; Referee: Nicolas Millas Lopez

28 November 2025 29	Cobresal	3–0	Colo-Colo	El Salvador
18:30	César Munder 12', 50'; Diego Coelho 44'	Report		Stadium: Estadio El Cobre; Attendance: 2,252; Referee: Juan Lara Luco

7 December 2025 30	Colo-Colo	1–2	Audax Italiano	Macul
18:00	Pizarro 88'	Report	Vargas 16'; Valencia 22' (pen.)	Stadium: Monumental; Referee: Piero Maza Gomez

=== Copa Chile ===
==== Group Stage ====
Pos	Team	Pld	W	D	L	GF	GA	GD	Pts	Qualification	LIM	SW	CC	USF
1	Deportes Limache	6	3	2	1	12	7	+5	11	Advance to the knockout stage	—	1–2	4–1	1–1
2	Santiago Wanderers	6	3	1	2	6	5	+1	10	Advance to the knockout stage	0–2	—	1–0	0–1
3	Colo-Colo	6	2	2	2	8	7	+1	8		2–2	0–0	—	4–0
4	Unión San Felipe	6	1	1	4	4	11	−7	4		1–2	1–3	0–1	—

Source: Campeonato Chileno, Soccerway
Legend: Blue = home team win; Yellow = draw; Red = away team win.
Rules for classification: 1) Points; 2) Goal difference; 3) Matches won; 4) Goals for; 5) Away goals for; 6) Red cards; 7) Yellow cards; 8) Copa Chile ranking; 9) Drawing of lots.

Matches

30 January 2025 1	Colo-Colo	2–2	Deportes Limache	Macul
20:00	Vegas 69'; Rodríguez 81'		Da Silva 12'; Romero 84'	Stadium: Monumental; Attendance: 27,783; Referee: Gastón Philippe

3 February 2025 2	Santiago Wanderers	1–0	Colo-Colo	Valparaíso
18:00	Gatica 33'			Stadium: Elías Figueroa; Attendance: 7,450; Referee: Miguel Araos

12 February 2025 3	Colo-Colo	4–0	Unión San Felipe	Macul
20:00	Correa 18', 30', 64' (pen.); Rodríguez 71'			Stadium: Monumental; Attendance: 25,549; Referee: Dione Rissios

23 March 2025 4	Unión San Felipe	0–1	Colo-Colo	La Calera
14:00		Report	Oroz 49'	Stadium: Estadio Municipal Nicolás Chahuán

6 April 2025 5	Colo-Colo	0–0	Santiago Wanderers	Macul
20:00		Report		Stadium: Monumental

10 May 2025 6	Deportes Limache	4–1	Colo-Colo	Quillota
15:00	Castro 24'; Pinares 62'; Romero 83'; Guerra 90' (pen.)	Report	Cepeda 26'	Stadium: Estadio Municipal Lucio Fariña Fernández

=== Supercopa de Chile ===
Colo-Colo was scheduled to face the 2024 Copa Chile champions Universidad de Chile on 25 January 2025 at Estadio La Portada in La Serena. However, four days before the date the match was scheduled to be played the ANFP announced its suspension as it had not been granted authorization by the Presidential Delegation of the Coquimbo Region to hold the event. On 29 January, ANFP president Pablo Milad confirmed that the Supercopa would change its format and would be contested over two legs, being tentatively rescheduled for July 2025.

14 September 2025	Colo-Colo	0–3	Universidad de Chile	Independencia, Santiago
15:00 UTC−3		Report	Sepúlveda 18'; Guerra 37'; Assadi 50'	Stadium: Estadio Santa Laura; Attendance: 3,000; Referee: Felipe González

=== Copa Libertadores ===
==== Group Stage ====
Colo-Colo will enter the competition in the group stage. The draw was held on March 17, 2025.

Pos	Team	Pld	W	D	L	GF	GA	GD	Pts	Qualification
1	(Argentina) Racing	6	4	1	1	14	3	+11	13	Advance to round of 16
2	(Brazil) Fortaleza	6	2	2	2	8	5	+3	8	Advance to round of 16
3	(Colombia) Atlético Bucaramanga	6	1	3	2	6	10	−4	6	Transfer to Copa Sudamericana
4	(Chile) Colo-Colo	6	1	2	3	5	15	−10	5	

Source: CONMEBOL

1 April 2025 1	Atlético Bucaramanga (Colombia)	3–3	(Chile) Colo-Colo	Bucaramanga, Colombia
19:30 UTC−5	Londoño 9'; Pons 24'; Henao 57'	Report	Correa 38' (pen.), 84'; Isla 63'	Stadium: Estadio Américo Montanini; Referee: Carlos Benítez (Paraguay)

10 April 2025 2	Colo-Colo (Chile)	0–3; Awarded	(Brazil) Fortaleza	Macul, Chile
20:30 UTC−4				Stadium: Estadio Monumental David Arellano
Note: The match was abandoned at 0–0 in the 68th minute following a pitch invasion after two supporters died in an incident prior to the start of the match. On 30 April 2025, CONMEBOL's Disciplinary Commission awarded Fortaleza a 3–0 win.

22 April 2025 3	Colo-Colo (Chile)	1–1	(Argentina) Racing	Macul, Chile
20:30 UTC−4	Cepeda 9'	Report	Barrios 86'	Stadium: Estadio Monumental David Arellano; Attendance: 0 (Note: Colo-Colo will play their home matches against Racing and Atlético Bucaramanga behind closed doors as they were punished for the incidents in their match against Fortaleza.); Referee: Juan Gabriel Benítez (Paraguay)

6 May 2025 4	Fortaleza (Brazil)	4–0	(Chile) Colo-Colo	Fortaleza, Brazil
17:00 UTC−5	Breno Lopes 25'; Marinho 30'; Deyverson 39'; Lucero 84'	Report		Stadium: Castelão; Referee: Jesús Valenzuela (Venezuela)

13 May 2025 5	Racing (Argentina)	4–0	(Chile) Colo-Colo	Avellaneda, Argentina
21:30 UTC−3	Martínez 36', 45+1'; Solari 51'; Balboa 81'	Report		Stadium: El Cilindro; Referee: Gustavo Tejera (Uruguay)

29 May 2025 6	Colo-Colo (Chile)	1–0	(Colombia) Atlético Bucaramanga	Macul, Chile
20:30 UTC−4		Report		Stadium: Estadio Monumental David Arellano; Attendance: 0 Referee: Kevin Ortega (Peru)
