= Andrés Oroz =

Chilean footballer (born 1980)

Personal information
- Full name: Andrés Patricio Oroz Peñaloza
- Date of birth: 2 August 1980 (age 46)
- Place of birth: Santiago, Chile
- Height: 1.75 m (5 ft 9 in)
- Position: Midfielder

Senior career*
Years	Team	Apps	(Gls)
1998–2002	Santiago Morning	9	(0)
2003	Universidad de Concepción	35	(7)
2003	Puebla	15	(0)
2005	Universidad de Chile	9	(0)
2005	Unión Española	0	(0)
2006	Santiago Morning	9	(0)
2006	Universidad de Concepción	16	(0)
2007	Deportes Antofagasta	27	(2)
2008	Rangers	26	(2)
2009–2010	Palestino	20	(0)
2010	Ñublense	2	(0)
2011	Cobreloa	26	(1)
2012	Rangers	24	(4)
2013	Deportes Antofagasta	2	(0)
Total		220	(16)

International career
2000	Chile U23	7	(3)
2001	Chile	1	(0)
- * Club domestic league appearances and goals

Andrés Patricio Oroz Peñaloza (born August 2, 1980) is a Chilean former footballer who played as midfielder.

== Club career ==
Professional debut in July 1998 by playing a match against Santiago Morning Deportes Antofagasta. He spent many years in all in the microbuseros, but fell to second division and went to Universidad de Concepción, where he had good campaigns along with his coach Fernando Díaz.

He had a good campaign in the penquista cast sign of Puebla F.C. in Mexico and 2005 reached Universidad de Chile. In the second half of 2005 he joined the ranks of Unión Española, which came to be club champion in the Apertura. After signing in Antofagasta, who led his former club coach at the Universidad de Concepción, Fernando Díaz. Then come to Rangers, the 2009 play by Palestino, and 2010 play in Ñublense, his current club.

== International career ==
He joined the Chilean under-23 selection who achieved the bronze medal at the 2000 Sydney Olympics.

Oroz represented the Chile national team in the 0–1 loss against Catalonia on 28 December 2001.

== Personal life ==
Oroz is the uncle of the professional footballer Alexander Oroz. In addition, his brother and Alexander's father, Antonio, was with the Colo-Colo youth ranks and plays football at amateur level as a left midfielder.

== Honours ==
=== National team ===
- Chile U23
  - Olympic Games: (bronze) in Sydney (2000)
