= Brayan Cortés =

Chilean footballer (born 1995)

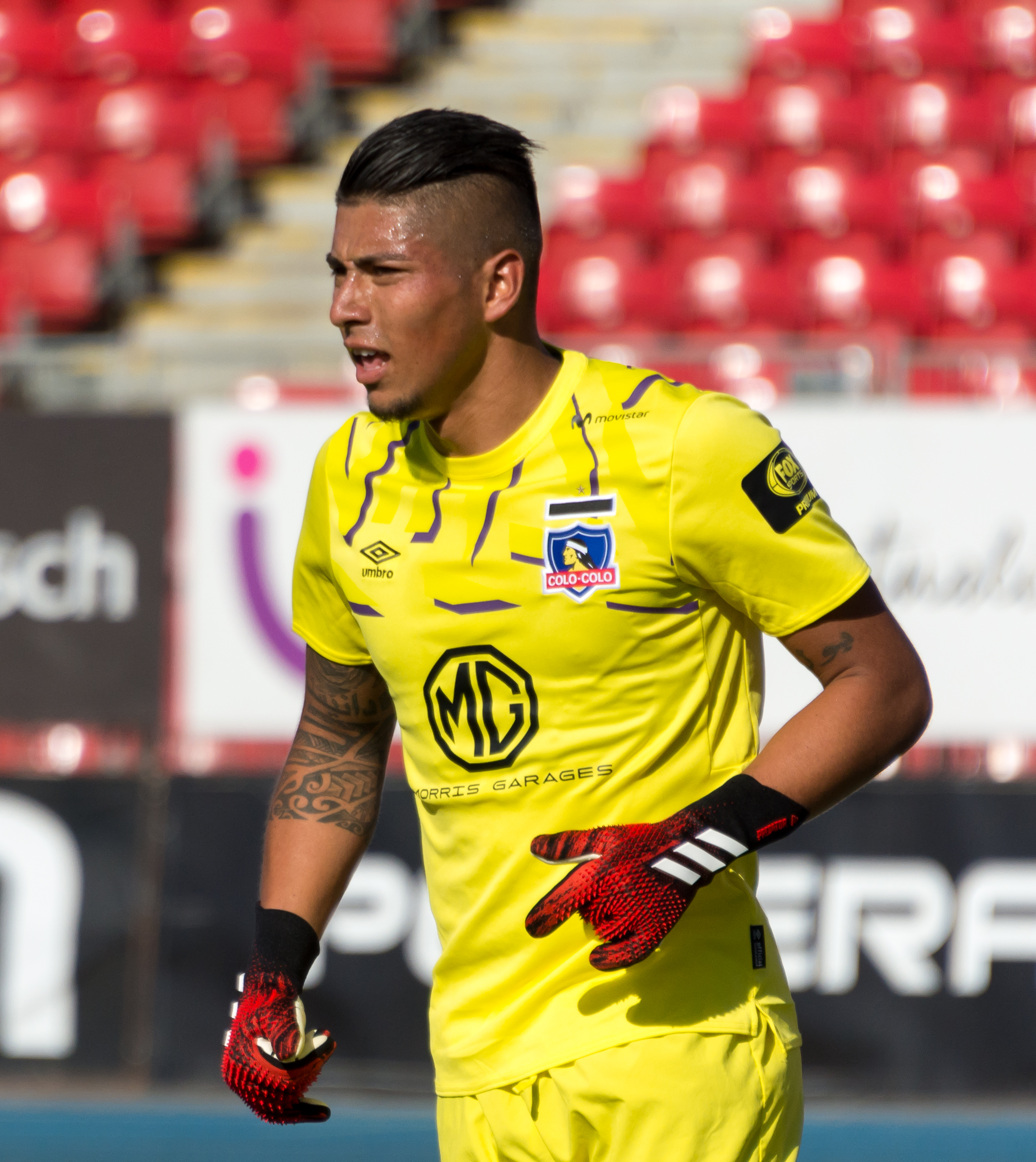
- Cortés with Colo-Colo in 2020.

Personal information
- Full name: Brayan Josué Cortés Fernández
- Date of birth: 11 March 1995 (age 31)
- Place of birth: Iquique, Chile
- Height: 1.85 m (6 ft 1 in)
- Position: Goalkeeper

Team information
- Current team: Argentinos Juniors (on loan from Colo-Colo)
- Number: 25

Youth career
- 2009–2012: Deportes Iquique

Senior career*
| Years | Team | Apps | (Gls) |
| 2013–2017 | Deportes Iquique | 38 | (0) |
| 2018– | Colo-Colo | 161 | (0) |
| 2025 | → Peñarol (loan) | 17 | (0) |
| 2026– | → Argentinos Juniors (loan) | 19 | (0) |

International career^{‡}
| 2013–2015 | Chile U20 | 1 | (0) |
| 2014–2023 | Chile U23 | 8 | (0) |
| 2018– | Chile | 25 | (0) |
Medal record
Men's football
Representing Chile
Pan American Games
| Silver medal – second place | 2023 Santiago | Team |
- * Club domestic league appearances and goals as of 17:29, 10 July 2026 (UTC) ‡ National team caps and goals as of 10 June 2025

Brayan Josué Cortés Fernández (born 11 March 1995) is a Chilean footballer that currently plays as goalkeeper for Argentine club Argentinos Juniors, on loan from Colo-Colo, and the Chile national team.

== Club career ==
=== Deportes Iquique ===
Born in Iquique, Chile, he played as goalkeeper since he was five and joined hometown Deportes Iquique youth set-up aged fourteen. He was promoted to the first adult team in 2013 and his professional debut came one year later on 30 March 2014, where conceded three goals in a 3–0 away loss with Ñublense.

After completing the 2013–14 with two appearances and a Copa Chile (as back-up), Cortés was chosen as the coming season's first-choice keeper by Héctor Pinto after Rodrigo Naranjo's injury. He played the tournament's first five matches, highlighting his performances against powerhouses Colo-Colo (2–0 loss) and Universidad de Chile (2–2 draw) that kept him some games more in the goal after returning the bench with Naranjo fully recovered.

He completed the 2014–15 season with eight appearances.

=== Colo-Colo ===
==== Peñarol (loan) ====
On 1 August 2025, Cortés joined on loan to Uruguayan club Peñarol on a deal until December of the same year with an option to buy.

==== Argentinos Juniors (loan) ====
On 4 January 2026, Cortés joined Argentinos Juniors on a one-year loan.

== International career ==
=== Chilean under-20 team ===
Cortés participated for Chile U20 at the 2013 South American Youth Football Championship, where the U20s reached its qualification to 2013 FIFA U-20 World Cup. He played one game during the contest in a 3–2 group stage win over Paraguay, being chosen as the man of the match.

Prior the Youth World Cup held in Turkey, Cortés played some exhibition games, highlighting a 4–4 draw with Uzbekistan where he performed well during the ninety minutes and saved a shoot during the penalties which bring to Chile the victory. On 31 May 2015, Cortés was included by Mario Salas in the 23-man roster to face the category's World Cup.

In 2015, he was included again in a Chilean national under-20 team roster, after being nominated by Hugo Tocalli to the South American Youth Championship in Uruguay. Cortes played in the Estadio La Corregidora in Querétaro, Mexico for the Chile national team against Mexico.

=== Chile under-23 team ===
Despite being 27, he represented Chile at under-23 level in a 1–0 win against Peru U23 on 31 August 2022, in the context of preparations for the 2023 Pan American Games. He was included in the final squad as an overage player alongside César Fuentes and Matías Zaldivia, where Chile won the silver medal.

== Career statistics ==
=== Club ===
As of 6 July 2025.

Appearances and goals by club, season and competition
| Club | Season | League | | | Cup | | Continental | | Other | | Total | |
| Club | Season | Division | Apps | Goals | Apps | Goals | Apps | Goals | Apps | Goals | Apps | Goals |
|---|---|---|---|---|---|---|---|---|---|---|---|---|
| Deportes Iquique | 2012 | Chilean Primera División | 0 | 0 | — | | 0 | 0 | — | | 1 | 0 |
| Deportes Iquique | 2013 | Chilean Primera División | 0 | 0 | — | | 0 | 0 | 0 | 0 | 0 | 0 |
| Deportes Iquique | 2013–14 | Chilean Primera División | 2 | 0 | 2 | 0 | — | | 0 | 0 | 4 | 0 |
| Deportes Iquique | 2014–15 | Chilean Primera División | 8 | 0 | 1 | 0 | 1 | 0 | — | | 10 | 0 |
| Deportes Iquique | 2015–16 | Chilean Primera División | 0 | 0 | 2 | 0 | — | | — | | 2 | 0 |
| Deportes Iquique | 2016–17 | Chilean Primera División | 13 | 0 | 2 | 0 | 5 | 0 | — | | 20 | 0 |
| Deportes Iquique | 2017 | Chilean Primera División | 15 | 0 | 2 | 0 | 2 | 0 | — | | 19 | 0 |
| Deportes Iquique | Total | | 38 | 0 | 9 | 0 | 8 | 0 | 0 | 0 | 55 | 0 |
| Colo-Colo | 2018 | Chilean Primera División | 2 | 0 | 1 | 0 | — | | 0 | 0 | 3 | 0 |
| Colo-Colo | 2019 | Chilean Primera División | 24 | 0 | 2 | 0 | 2 | 0 | — | | 28 | 0 |
| Colo-Colo | 2020 | Chilean Primera División | 29 | 0 | — | | 5 | 0 | 2 | 0 | 36 | 0 |
| Colo-Colo | 2021 | Chilean Primera División | 27 | 0 | 7 | 0 | — | | — | | 34 | 0 |
| Colo-Colo | 2022 | Chilean Primera División | 27 | 0 | 2 | 0 | 8 | 0 | 1 | 0 | 38 | 0 |
| Colo-Colo | 2023 | Chilean Primera División | 21 | 0 | 3 | 0 | 4 | 0 | 1 | 0 | 29 | 0 |
| Colo-Colo | 2024 | Chilean Primera División | 23 | 0 | 1 | 0 | 14 | 0 | 1 | 0 | 39 | 0 |
| Colo-Colo | 2025 | Chilean Primera División | 8 | 0 | 2 | 0 | 5 | 0 | 0 | 0 | 15 | 0 |
| Colo-Colo | Total | | 161 | 0 | 18 | 0 | 38 | 0 | 5 | 0 | 222 | 0 |
| Career total | | | 199 | 0 | 27 | 0 | 46 | 0 | 5 | 0 | 277 | 0 |

=== International ===
As of match played 10 June 2025

| National team | Year | Apps | Goals |
|---|---|---|---|
| Chile | 2017 | 0 | 0 |
| Chile | 2018 | 2 | 0 |
| Chile | 2019 | 1 | 0 |
| Chile | 2020 | 1 | 0 |
| Chile | 2021 | 0 | 0 |
| Chile | 2022 | 5 | 0 |
| Chile | 2023 | 7 | 0 |
| Chile | 2024 | 4 | 0 |
| Chile | 2025 | 5 | 0 |
| Total | | 25 | 0 |

== Honours ==
Deportes Iquique

- Copa Chile (1): 2013–14

Colo-Colo

- Chilean Primera División (2): 2022, 2024
- Copa Chile (3): 2019, 2021, 2023
- Supercopa de Chile (3): 2018, 2022, 2024

Peñarol

- Copa Uruguay (1): 2025
- Liga AUF Uruguaya - Torneo Clausura (1): 2025

Chile U23

- Pan American Games Silver Medal: 2023

Individual

- Chilean Primera División Ideal Team: 2022, 2023, 2024
- Chilean Primera División Best Save: 2022, 2024
