= Lucas Cepeda =

Chilean footballer (born 2002)

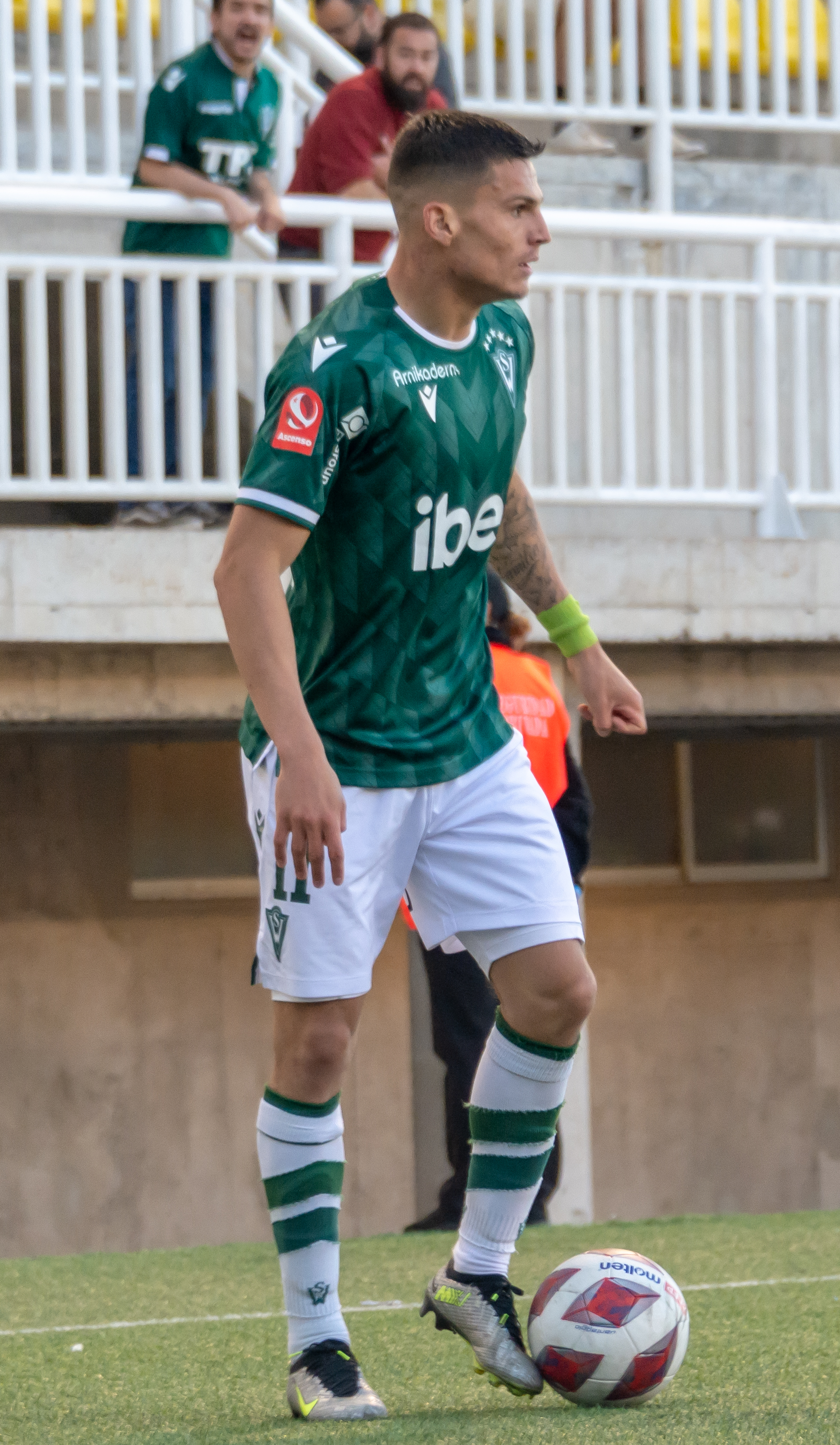
- Cepeda with Santiago Wanderers in 2023

Personal information
- Full name: Lucas Antonio Cepeda Barturen
- Date of birth: 31 October 2002 (age 24)
- Place of birth: Viña del Mar, Chile
- Height: 1.77 m (5 ft 10 in)
- Position: Forward

Team information
- Current team: Elche
- Number: 24

Youth career
- Aguas Buenas
- 2012: Colo-Colo
- 2013–2016: Everton
- 2016–2020: Santiago Wanderers

Senior career*
Years	Team	Apps	(Gls)
2021–2023	Santiago Wanderers	61	(7)
2024–2026	Colo-Colo	46	(8)
2026–	Elche	17	(1)

International career^{‡}
2024	Chile U23	3	(0)
2024–	Chile	18	(4)
- * Club domestic league appearances and goals as of 19 September 2026 ‡ National team caps and goals as of 6 October 2026

Lucas Antonio Cepeda Barturen (born 31 October 2002) is a Chilean professional footballer who plays as a left forward for La Liga club Elche and the Chile national team.

== Club career ==
=== Santiago Wanderers ===
Cepeda started his career in the youth ranks of Santiago Wanderers. Nevertheless, he had a brief spell at the Colo-Colo academy in the Estadio Monumental David Arellano, which he abandoned due to the exhaustion generated by the constant trips between Santiago and Curauma, where, at that time, he lived and the Everton de Viña del Mar youth ranks between 2013 and 2016.

In 2021, Cepeda was promoted to Wanderers senior team. He made his professional debut in a 2–0 defeat against Palestino in a Chilean Primera División match. After Wanderers' relegation to Primera B, Cepeda made sporadic appearances in the 2022 campaign but was named starter for the 2023 season, where the team failed to promote to the first-tier during the promotion playoffs finals with Deportes Iquique.

=== Colo-Colo ===
On 11 February 2024, it was announced that Cepeda signed with Colo-Colo. On March 31, he scored his first goal for the team in a 4–1 home win over Everton de Viña del Mar, Wanderers' historic rival. Three days later, Cepeda scored his first continental goal against Paraguayan side, Cerro Porteño, for the 2024 Copa Libertadores. His score was an agonizing goal (90' min). Months later, on August 20, he netted a key goal against Junior de Barranquilla in a 1–2 visit victory at Colombia for the 2024 Copa Libertadores Round of 16.

=== Elche ===
In January 2026, Cepeda moved abroad and signed with La Liga club Elche on a deal until 2030.

== International career ==
In 2024, Cepeda received a call from the coach, Nicolás Córdova, to play in the CONMEBOL Pre-Olympic Tournament held in Venezuela. He played three games in that competition.

At senior level, Cepeda received his first call-up for the 2026 FIFA World Cup qualification matches against Brazil and Colombia in October 2024. He made his debut in the first match on 10 October.

On 19 November 2024, Cepeda scored his first two international goals against Venezuela at the Estado Nacional in Santiago.

== Career statistics ==
=== Club ===
As of 19 September 2026

Appearances and goals by club, season and competition
Club	Season	League			National cup		Continental		Other		Total	
Club	Season	Division	Apps	Goals	Apps	Goals	Apps	Goals	Apps	Goals	Apps	Goals
Santiago Wanderers	2021	Liga de Primera	6	0	1	0	—		—		7	0
Santiago Wanderers	2022	Campeonato Nacional Primera B	23	4	1	0	—		—		24	4
Santiago Wanderers	2023	Campeonato Nacional Primera B	32	3	2	0	—		—		34	3
Santiago Wanderers	Total		61	7	4	0	—		—		65	7
Colo-Colo	2024	Liga de Primera	20	3	6	3	7	2	1	0	34	8
Colo-Colo	2025	Liga de Primera	26	5	5	1	6	1	1	0	38	7
Colo-Colo	Total		46	8	11	4	13	3	2	0	72	15
Elche	2025–26	La Liga	10	0	—		—		—		10	0
Elche	2026–27	La Liga	7	0	0	0	—		—		7	0
Elche	Total		17	0	0	0	—		—		17	0
Career total			117	15	15	4	13	3	2	0	147	22

=== International ===
As of match played 6 October 2026

Appearances and goals by national team and year
National team	Year	Apps	Goals
Chile	2024	3	2
Chile	2025	9	1
Chile	2026	6	1
Total		18	4

Scores and results list Chile's goal tally first

List of international goals scored by Lucas Cepeda
No.	Date	Venue	Cap	Opponent	Score	Result	Competition
1.	19 November 2024	Estadio Nacional Julio Martínez Prádanos, Santiago, Chile	3	Venezuela	3–2	4–2	2026 FIFA World Cup qualification
2.	19 November 2024	Estadio Nacional Julio Martínez Prádanos, Santiago, Chile	3	Venezuela	4–2	4–2	2026 FIFA World Cup qualification
3.	8 February 2025	Estadio Nacional Julio Martínez Prádanos, Santiago, Chile	4	Panama	4–1	6–1	Friendly
4.	6 June 2026	Estádio Nacional, Oeiras, Portugal	15	Portugal	1–2	1–2	Friendly

== Honours ==
Colo-Colo

- Chilean Primera División: 2024
- Supercopa de Chile: 2024

Individual

- Chilean Primera División Best U-21 Player: 2024
- Chilean Primera División Ideal Team: 2025
