= Víctor Méndez =

Chilean footballer (born 1999)

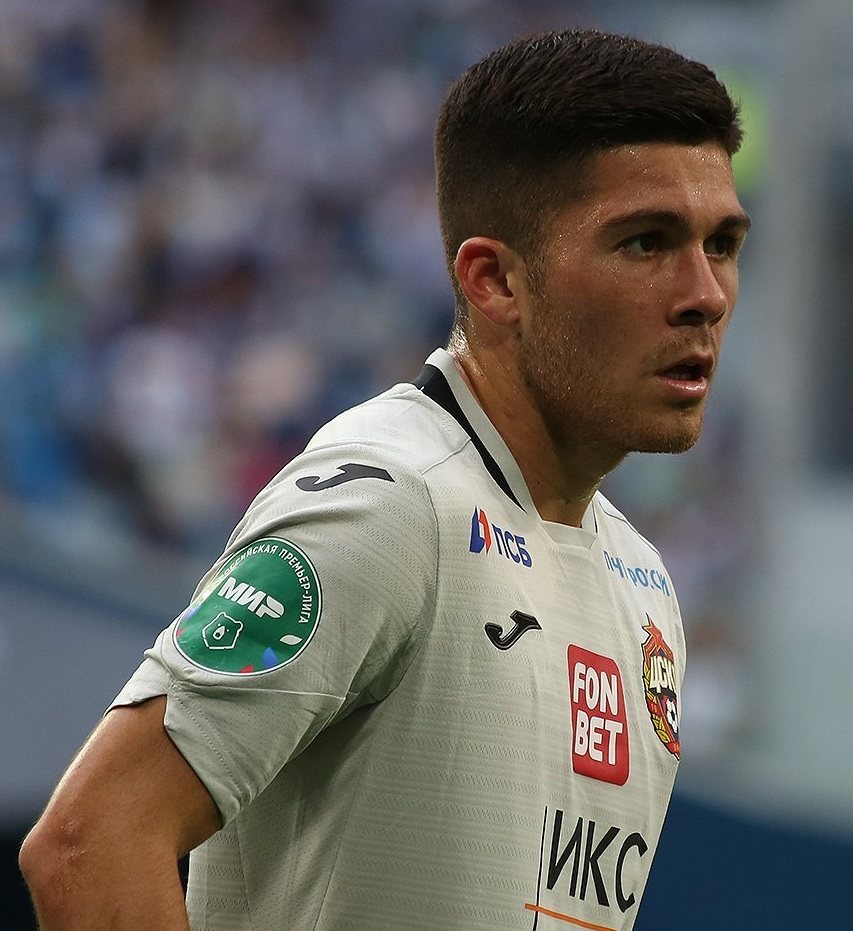
- Méndez with CSKA Moscow in 2022

Personal information
- Full name: Víctor Felipe Méndez Obando
- Date of birth: 23 September 1999 (age 27)
- Place of birth: Valdivia, Chile
- Height: 1.72 m (5 ft 8 in)
- Position: Defensive midfielder

Team information
- Current team: Colo-Colo
- Number: 5

Youth career
- Atlético Merino
- Unión Española

Senior career*
Years	Team	Apps	(Gls)
2017–2022	Unión Española	116	(3)
2022–2025	CSKA Moscow	50	(1)
2024–2025	→ Krylia Sovetov (loan)	10	(0)
2025–	Colo-Colo	45	(4)

International career^{‡}
2018–2019	Chile U20	8	(0)
2021–	Chile	16	(0)
Medal record
Men's football
Representing Chile
South American Games
Gold medal – first place	2018 Cochabamba
- * Club domestic league appearances and goals as of 13 September 2026 ‡ National team caps and goals as of 6 October 2026

Víctor Felipe Méndez Obando (born 23 September 1999) is a Chilean professional footballer who plays as a defensive midfielder for Colo-Colo and the Chile national team.

== Club career ==
Born in Valdivia, Chile, Méndez was with local club Atlético Merino before joining the Unión Española youth ranks.

On 28 July 2022, Méndez signed a three-year contract with Russian Premier League club CSKA Moscow.

On 12 April 2024, Méndez extended his contract with CSKA to June 2026.

On 12 September 2024, Méndez moved on loan to Krylia Sovetov Samara, joining his national team and former Unión Española teammate Thomas Galdames at the club. In January 2025, Méndez went AWOL, failing to show up on time for Krylia's training camp.

On 22 January 2025, Colo-Colo announced the transfer of Méndez. CSKA communications director commented on the same day that the announcement is premature as the transfer contract is being discussed, but is not yet finalized and signed. On 27 January 2025, Krylia Sovetov formally announced the termination of the loan contract with CSKA. CSKA confirmed the transfer to Colo-Colo on 29 January 2025.

== International career ==
At under-20 level, Méndez represented Chile in both the 2018 South American Games, winning the gold medal, and the 2019 South American Championship

Méndez made his debut for the Chile national team on 9 December 2021 in a 2–2 draw against Mexico.

== Career statistics ==
=== Club ===
As of match played 13 September 2026

Appearances and goals by club, season and competition
Club	Season	League			Cup		League Cup		Continental		Other		Total	
Club	Season	Division	Apps	Goals	Apps	Goals	Apps	Goals	Apps	Goals	Apps	Goals	Apps	Goals
Unión Española	2017	Liga de Primera	0	0	1	0	—		0	0	0	0	1	0
Unión Española	2018	Liga de Primera	21	0	2	0	—		0	0	1 (Note: Appearance in the Chilean Primera División play-offs)	0	24	0
Unión Española	2019	Liga de Primera	18	0	6	0	—		3 (Note: Appearances in the Copa Sudamericana)	1	0	0	27	1
Unión Española	2020	Liga de Primera	32	1	0	0	—		0	0	0	0	32	1
Unión Española	2021	Liga de Primera	29	1	8	0	—		2 (Note: Appearances in the Copa Libertadores)	1	0	0	39	2
Unión Española	2022	Liga de Primera	16	1	1	0	—		1 (Note: Appearances in the Copa Sudamericana)	0	0	0	18	1
Unión Española	Total		116	3	18	0	—		6	2	1	0	141	5
CSKA Moscow	2022–23	Russian Premier League	26	0	12	0	—		—		0	0	38	0
CSKA Moscow	2023–24	Russian Premier League	24	1	8	0	—		—		1 (Note: Appearance in Russian Super Cup)	0	33	1
CSKA Moscow	2024–25	Russian Premier League	0	0	0	0	—		—		—		0	0
CSKA Moscow	Total		50	1	20	0	—		—		1	0	71	1
Krylia Sovetov (loan)	2024–25	Russian Premier League	10	0	3	0	—		—		—		13	0
Colo-Colo	2025	Liga de Primera	22	2	6	0	—		3	0	1 (Note: Appearance in Supercopa de Chile)	0	32	2
Colo-Colo	2026	Liga de Primera	23	2	5	0	5	0	0	0	—		33	2
Colo-Colo	Total		45	4	11	0	5	0	3	0	1	0	65	4
Career total			215	8	52	0	5	0	9	2	3	0	290	10

=== International ===
As of match played 6 October 2026

Appearances and goals by national team and year
National team	Year	Apps	Goals
Chile	2021	2	0
Chile	2022	4	0
Chile	2023	6	0
Chile	2026	4	0
Total		16	0

== Honours ==
CSKA Moscow

- Russian Cup: 2022–23

Chile U20

- South American Games Gold medal: 2018
