= Daniel Castro (footballer) =

Chilean footballer (born 1994)

Personal information
- Full name: Daniel Esteban Castro Santibáñez
- Date of birth: 27 April 1994 (age 32)
- Place of birth: Campiche, Puchuncaví, Chile
- Height: 1.69 m (5 ft 7 in)
- Position: Forward

Team information
- Current team: Deportes Limache
- Number: 19

Youth career
- Bernardo O'Higgins
- Cruz del Llano

Senior career*
Years	Team	Apps	(Gls)
2013–2015	Quintero Unido		
2016	General Velásquez		(19)
2017	Deportes Limache		
2018	Unión La Calera	2	(0)
2018–2019	Deportes Limache	?	(52)
2020–2021	Unión Española	11	(0)
2021	Deportes Limache	8	(3)
2022	Santiago Wanderers	8	(2)
2023–	Deportes Limache	18	(7)
- * Club domestic league appearances and goals as of 11 September 2023

Daniel Esteban Castro Santibáñez (born 27 April 1994) is a Chilean footballer who plays as a forward for Deportes Limache.

== Career ==
He has become the top goalscorer of the fourth division of the Chilean football for three times: in 2016 playing for General Velásquez and in 2018 and 2019 playing for Deportes Limache. In 2020, he joined Unión Española in the Chilean Primera División. In 2022, he joined Santiago Wanderers in the Primera B.

For the 2023 season, he switched to Deportes Limache, winning the league title.

== Personal life ==
He is nicknamed Popin, like a Chilean comic TV character.

== Honours ==
Deportes Limache

- Segunda División Profesional de Chile: 2023

Individual

- Tercera A top scorer: 2016, 2018, 2019
