= Francisco Marchant =

Chilean footballer

Personal information
- Full name: Francisco Javier Marchant Madrid
- Date of birth: 31 July 2006 (age 20)
- Place of birth: Santiago, Chile
- Height: 1.70 m (5 ft 7 in)
- Position: Winger

Team information
- Current team: Colo-Colo
- Number: 7

Youth career
- Colo-Colo

Senior career*
Years	Team	Apps	(Gls)
2025–	Colo-Colo	31	(1)

International career^{‡}
2023	Chile U17	8	(0)
2025–	Chile U20	4	(0)
- * Club domestic league appearances and goals as of 15 November 2026 ‡ National team caps and goals as of 8 December 2025

Francisco Javier Marchant Madrid (born 31 July 2006) is a Chilean professional footballer who plays as a winger for Colo-Colo.

== Club career ==
A product of Colo-Colo, Marchant was promoted to the first team in 2025 under Jorge Almirón and made his senior debut in the friendly match against Racing Club on 18 January. He made his official professional debut in the Copa Chile match against Unión San Felipe on 12 February. He scored his first goal in the 2–1 away loss against Audax Italiano on 22 June of the same year.

In November 2025, Marchant was ranked eight by CIES Football Observatory in most key passes for shots per 90 minutes in 10 Latin America's leagues. On 24 December of the same year, he was ranked 53 in best non-big-5 league players born in 2006 or later.

== International career ==
Marchant represented Chile at under-17 in the 2023 South American Championship.

In 2025, Marchant represented Chile U20 at the FIFA World Cup.
