= Leandro Hernández =

Chilean footballer

Personal information
- Full name: Leandro Aníbal Hernández Espinoza
- Date of birth: 13 June 2005 (age 21)
- Place of birth: Santiago, Chile
- Height: 1.73 m (5 ft 8 in)
- Position: Winger

Team information
- Current team: Colo-Colo
- Number: 24

Youth career
- Colo-Colo

Senior career*
Years	Team	Apps	(Gls)
2023–	Colo-Colo	50	(10)

International career^{‡}
2024–2025	Chile U20	8	(0)
2026–	Chile	1	(0)
- * Club domestic league appearances and goals as of 13 September 2026 ‡ National team caps and goals as of 29 September 2026

Leandro Aníbal Hernández Espinoza (born 13 June 2005) is a Chilean professional footballer who plays as a winger for Colo-Colo and the Chile national team.

== Club career ==
A product of Colo-Colo, Hernández was promoted to the first team by Jorge Almirón and made his senior debut in the friendly match against River Plate on 15 November 2023, scoring a goal. He made his official professional debut in the 0–2 loss against Unión Española on 3 December of the same year for the Chilean Primera División. The next year, he signed his first professional contract on 10 January.

== International career ==
Hernández represented Chile U20 at the 2025 South American Championship.

Hernández also was part of the Chile under-23 squad at the 2024 Pre-Olympic Tournament.

At senior level, Hernández received his first call-up for the friendly matches against Canada, United States and Mexico in September and October 2026. He made his debut in the match against the United States at the minute 58.

== Career statistics ==
=== International ===
As of match played 29 September 2026

Appearances and goals by national team and year
National team	Year	Apps	Goals
Chile	2026	1	0
Total		1	0
