= Matías Sepúlveda =

Chilean footballer (born 1999)

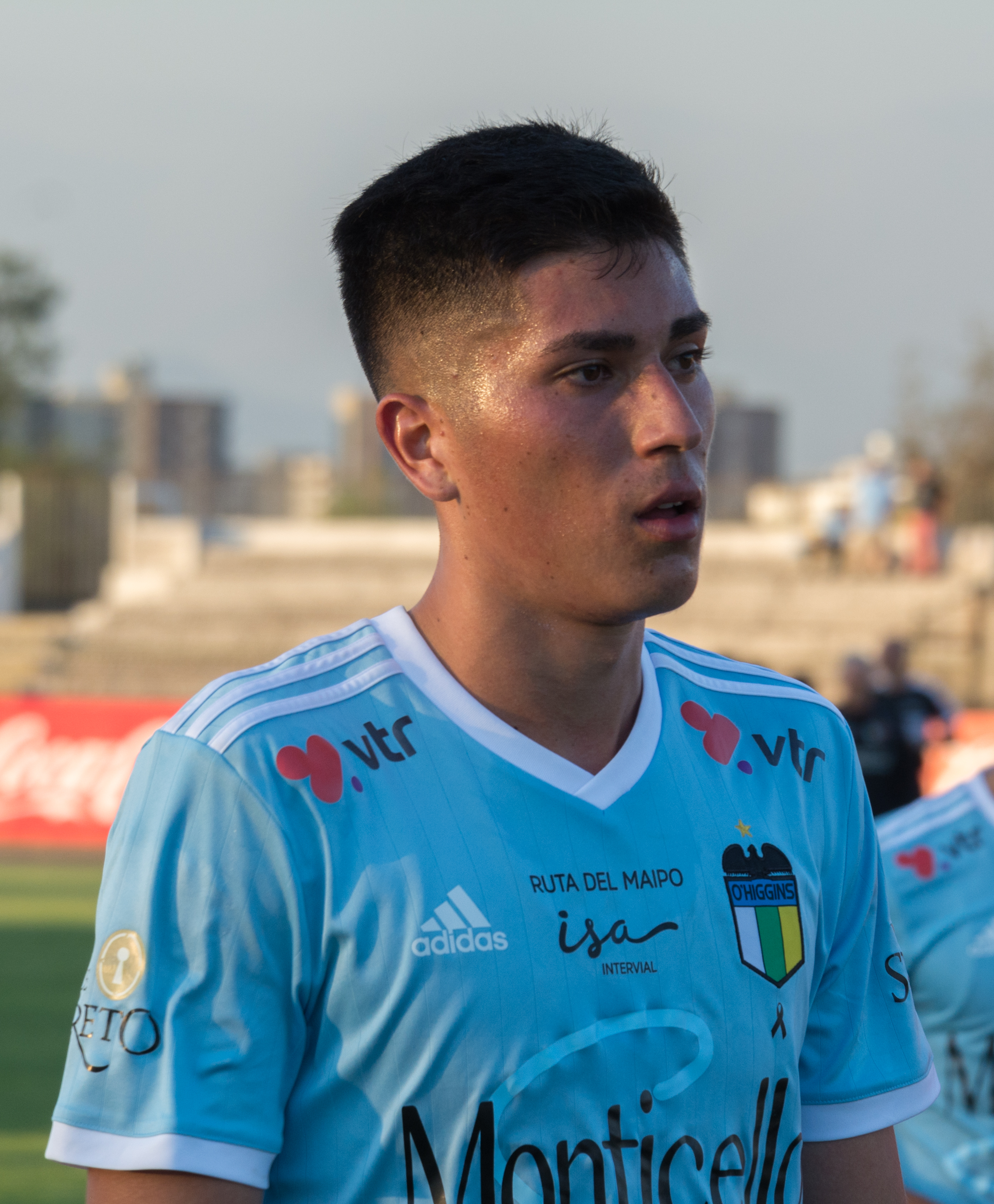
- Sepúlveda with O'Higgins in 2019

Personal information
- Full name: Matías Ignacio Sepúlveda Méndez
- Date of birth: 12 March 1999 (age 27)
- Place of birth: Santiago, Chile
- Height: 1.79 m (5 ft 10 in)
- Position: Left midfielder

Team information
- Current team: Lanús
- Number: 16

Youth career
- 2013-2016: Colo-Colo

Senior career*
Years	Team	Apps	(Gls)
2017–2021	O'Higgins	94	(13)
2022–2023	Audax Italiano	52	(26)
2024–2026	Universidad de Chile	48	(3)
2026–	Lanús	22	(0)

International career^{‡}
2018–2019	Chile U20	16	(7)
2025–	Chile	3	(1)
Medal record
Men's football
Representing Chile
South American Games
Gold medal – first place	2018 Cochabamba
- * Club domestic league appearances and goals as of 22:14, 14 September 2026 (UTC) ‡ National team caps and goals as of 6 October 2026

Matías Ignacio Sepúlveda Méndez (born 12 March 1999) is a Chilean football player who plays as a left midfielder for Argentine club Lanús and the Chile national team.

== Club career ==
Sepúlveda was sold in the youth categories of Colo-Colo for the O'Higgins in 2017, Sepúlveda played for Audax Italiano in 2022–23.

In 2024, he signed with Universidad de Chile on a three-year deal.

In July 2025, Universidad de Chile's CEO prevented him from signing with E.C Vitória from Brazil, Sepúlveda has already openly spoken about his desire to have gone to play in Brazil. The Brazilian sent an offer of 5 million dollars for Sepúlveda.

On 15 January 2026, Sepúlveda signed with Argentine club Lanús on a deal until December 2029.

== International career ==
At under-20 level, Sepúlveda represented Chile in both the 2018 South American Games, winning the gold medal, and the 2019 South American Championship.

At senior level, Sepúlveda received his first call-up to the Chile national team for the 2026 FIFA World Cup qualification matches against Argentina and Bolivia in June 2025.

== Career statistics ==
=== International ===
As of match played 6 October 2026

Appearances and goals by national team and year
National team	Year	Apps	Goals
Chile	2025	1	0
Chile	2026	2	1
Total		3	1

List of international goals scored by Darío Osorio
No.	Date	Venue	Opponent	Score	Result	Competition
1.	9 June 2026	Stade de la Source, Orléans, France	DR Congo	2–0	2–1	Friendly

== Honours ==
Chile U20

- South American Games Gold medal: 2018

Lanús

- Recopa Sudamericana: 2026
