= Chile national football team =

Men's association football team

Chile
- Nickname: La Roja (The Red One)
- Association: Federación de Fútbol de Chile (FFCh)
- Confederation: CONMEBOL (South America)
- Head coach: Nicolás Córdova
- Captain: Gabriel Suazo
- Most caps: Alexis Sánchez (168)
- Top scorer: Alexis Sánchez (51)
- Home stadium: Estadio Nacional Julio Martínez Prádanos
- FIFA code: CHI
First colours	Second colours

FIFA ranking
- Current: 51 ▼1 (18 November 2026)
- Highest: 3 (April–May 2016)
- Lowest: 84 (December 2002)

First international
- Argentina 3–1 Chile (Buenos Aires, Argentina; 27 May 1910)

Biggest win
- Chile 7–0 Venezuela (Santiago, Chile; 29 August 1979); Chile 7–0 Armenia (Viña del Mar, Chile; 4 January 1997); Mexico 0–7 Chile (Santa Clara, United States; 18 June 2016)

Biggest defeat
- Brazil 7–0 Chile (Rio de Janeiro, Brazil; 17 September 1959)

World Cup
- Appearances: 9 (first in 1930, last in 2014)
- Best result: Third place (1962)

Copa América
- Appearances: 41 (first in 1916)
- Best result: Champions (2015, 2016)

Panamerican Championship
- Appearances: 2 (first in 1952)
- Best result: Runners-up (1952)

Confederations Cup
- Appearances: 1 (first in 2017)
- Best result: Runners-up (2017)
Medal record
Men's football
FIFA World Cup
Bronze medal – third place	1962 Chile	Team
Copa América
Gold medal – first place	2015 Chile	Team
Gold medal – first place	2016 United States	Team
Silver medal – second place	1955 Chile	Team
Silver medal – second place	1956 Uruguay	Team
Silver medal – second place	1979 South America	Team
Silver medal – second place	1987 Argentina	Team
Bronze medal – third place	1926 Chile	Team
Bronze medal – third place	1941 Chile	Team
Bronze medal – third place	1945 Chile	Team
Bronze medal – third place	1967 Uruguay	Team
Bronze medal – third place	1991 Chile	Team
FIFA Confederations Cup
Silver medal – second place	2017 Russia	Team
Panamerican Championship
Silver medal – second place	1952 Chile	Team
- Website: laroja.cl

The Chile national football team (Spanish: Selección de fútbol de Chile), nicknamed La Roja (lit. 'The Red One'), represents Chile in men's international football competitions and is controlled by the Federación de Fútbol de Chile (English: Football Federation of Chile), which was established in 1895. Chile has appeared in nine World Cup tournaments and were hosts of the 1962 FIFA World Cup where they finished in third place, the highest position the country has ever achieved in the World Cup.

Chile won their first Copa América title on home soil at the 2015 Copa América, defeating Argentina in the final. They successfully defended their title in another final against Argentina where they won on penalties at Copa América Centenario the following year in the United States. Prior to this, Chile had been runners-up in the competition on four occasions. As a result of winning the 2015 Copa América, they qualified for the 2017 FIFA Confederations Cup, where they finished second, behind Germany, in their debut appearance.

== History ==
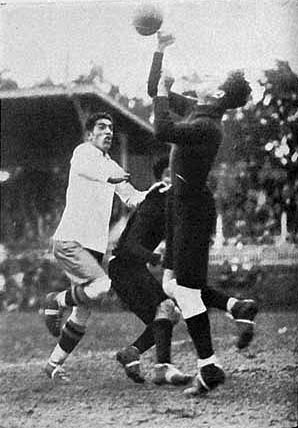
The Chile national team playing at the 1930 FIFA World Cup against Mexico.

=== The early stage ===
The Federación de Fútbol de Chile is the second oldest South American federation, having been founded in Valparaíso on 19 June 1895. Chile was one of the four founding member nations of CONMEBOL. Together with Argentina, Brazil, and Uruguay, the four competed in the first South American Championship, later to be renamed the Copa América, in 1916. On 12 October 1926, Chile made the first corner-kick goal in Copa América history in a match against Bolivia. Chile was one of the thirteen national teams that competed in the inaugural World Cup in 1930. The team started off well, beating Mexico and France without conceding a goal. A 3–1 loss to Argentina in the final game left the Chilean team in second place within the group, eliminating it from the tournament. In the 1950 World Cup, Chile defeated the United States, 5–2, but nevertheless was eliminated in the first round.

The best Chilean result in the World Cup was third place in 1962, as the host nation. Chile lost 2–4 to the eventual champion Brazil in a semi-final but went on to defeat Yugoslavia 1–0 to win the third place. Chilean players made two World Cup firsts: the first player to miss a World Cup penalty kick was the Chilean Guillermo Subiabre, in a 1930 FIFA World Cup match against France, and Carlos Caszely of Chile became the first player to be sent off with a red card, during a match against West Germany at the 1974 World Cup.

=== Maracanazo Scandal and punishment (1989 - 1994) ===
A scandal known as "El Maracanazo" occurred on 3 September 1989. At a 1990 FIFA World Cup qualifying match at Rio de Janeiro's Maracanã stadium, Brazil led Chile 1–0 and La Roja needed to win. Chilean goalkeeper Roberto Rojas fell to the pitch with an apparent injury in his forehead. A firework had been thrown from the stands by a Brazilian fan named Rosenery Mello do Nascimento and was smouldering about a yard away. After Rojas was carried off the pitch, the Chilean players and coaches claimed that conditions were unsafe and they refused to resume the game, so the match was abandoned. However, a video footage of the match later showed that the firework had not made any contact to Rojas, and examinations of his injury determined it to be caused by a cut, and not from the impact of any firework, as there were no traces of gunpowder; indeed, Rojas would later confess he had a razor concealed in his glove, and it was part of a plan to cancel the match and prevent Brazil's qualification over Chile. Based on this evidence, FIFA decided to award the victory to Brazil; meanwhile, Chile was banned from the 1990 World Cup and the qualifiers for the 1994 FIFA World Cup, and Rojas himself was banned for life, although an amnesty was granted in 2001.

=== 1998 World Cup and 2000 Olympic Games (1996 - 2000) ===
Chile's qualification for the 1998 World Cup in France marked the national team's return to the tournament after a 16-year absence. Coached by Nelson Acosta, the team had an inconsistent start to the South American qualifiers, but staged a remarkable comeback thanks to their strength at home and the outstanding performance of the attacking duo of Iván Zamorano and Marcelo Salas, who scored 23 of the team's 32 goals. Chile finished fourth, tied on points with Peru but ahead on goal difference, securing their qualification with a convincing 3-0 victory over Bolivia.

At the 1998 World Cup in France, Chile put on a remarkable performance, albeit one marked by frustration. They debuted with a 2-2 draw against Italy after coming from behind with two goals from Marcelo Salas, but just when it seemed they would secure a historic victory, the referee awarded a controversial penalty when the ball struck Ronald Fuentes' hand in the final minutes. Roberto Baggio converted the spot kick to level the score. In their second match, Chile again took the lead thanks to Salas against Austria, but conceded a 93rd-minute equalizer, narrowly missing out on early qualification. In their final group stage match, they drew 1-1 with Cameroon, with an exquisite free-kick goal by José Luis Sierra, securing their place in the round of 16 with three draws. There, they faced the powerful Brazil, the reigning champions, and were defeated 4-1 despite another goal from Salas.

At the 2000 Sydney Olympic Games, Chile had one of the most memorable campaigns in its history. After topping the group stage with victories over Morocco (4-1) and Spain (3-1), despite a loss to South Korea (0-1), Chile eliminated Nigeria 2-1 in the quarterfinals to reach the semifinals. In the semifinals, they lost 1-0 to Cameroon in a hard-fought match, but recovered with a resounding 2-0 victory over the United States in the third-place game, thanks to two goals from Iván Zamorano, securing the bronze medal—the first Olympic medal in the history of Chilean football and one of the most outstanding performances by the national team in international competitions. Zamorano also was the top goal scorer of the tournament.

=== Crisis and scandals (2001 - 2007) ===
After years of strong performance, the national team experienced a marked decline. They finished last in the qualifiers for the 2002 Korea Japan World Cup. Nelson Acosta continued as coach, but was replaced by Pedro García and then Jorge Garcés. In the 2001 Copa América, they achieved victories against Ecuador and Venezuela, but lost to Mexico in the quarterfinals. Juvenal Olmos was the coach for the new cycle, but the poor results continued. In the 2004 Copa América, they failed to advance beyond the group stage, and they also failed to qualify for the 2006 Germany World Cup finishing in 7th place.

Acosta returned as coach, however, in 2006 during a friendly tour of Dublin, Ireland, a scandal erupted within the national team when the coach overheard women at the team's training camp at night during off-hours. Supposedly, they were fans, but Acosta subsequently dismissed Reinaldo Navia and Mark González from the team.

During the 2007 Copa América tournament, the Chilean Football Federation banned six of the national team players, because of "internal indiscipline", for 20 international matches each as they damaged the team hotel property while under the influence of alcohol. The players banned were captain Jorge Valdivia, defenders Álvaro Ormeño, Rodrigo Tello, Jorge Vargas, Pablo Contreras and striker Reinaldo Navia. Chile had qualified to the quarter-finals after a 3–2 win against Ecuador, and a 0–0 draw against Mexico. But two losses, one of those being a 6–1 defeat against Brazil, sealed Acosta's fate. Former Argentina manager Marcelo Bielsa was given the task of becoming the Chile national team manager in preparation for the 2010 World Cup qualifiers. Ormeño and Navia were never called up again.

=== Golden generation (2008 - 2019) ===
==== Bielsa's era (2008−2012) ====
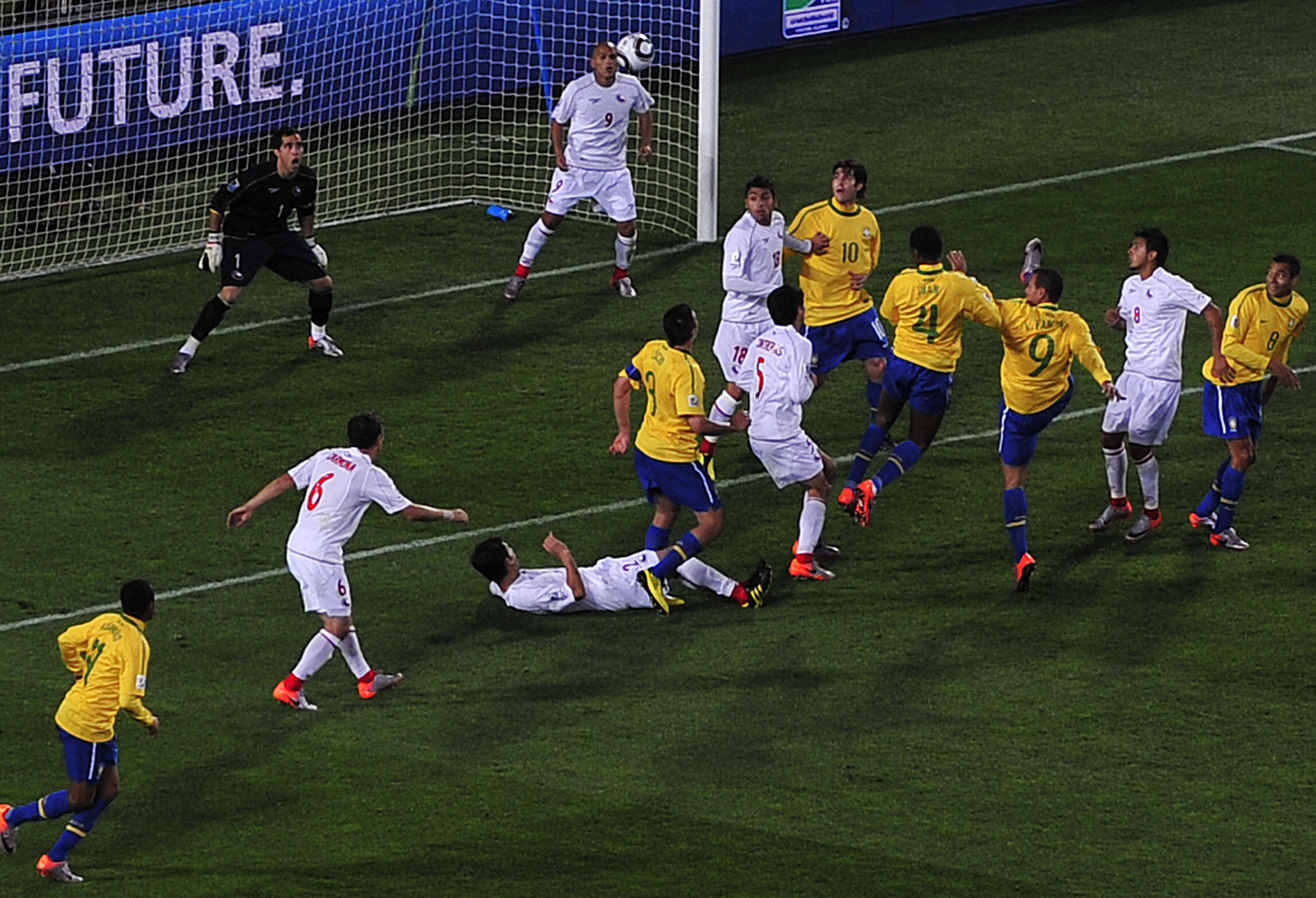
Chile vs Brazil at the 2010 World Cup at the round of 16.

On 16 October 2008, Chile beat Argentina 1–0 for the first time in a qualifying competition, making history. Marcelo Bielsa was acclaimed for this accomplishment by both Chilean and Argentinian people. This match was seen as one of the reasons that ended Alfio Basile's tenure as the Argentina coach. After finishing second place at the 2010 World Cup qualifiers, Chile qualified for the 2010 FIFA World Cup held in South Africa after 12 years absence in good form, with wins to Colombia (4-2), Paraguay (2-0) and Perú (3-1) as visit, and Humberto Suazo being the top goal scorer of the tournament.

The team later reached to the round of 16 at the tournament after two wins against Honduras and Switzerland in the group stage. Despite losing 0–3 to Brazil in the round of 16, marking a good come back to the competition finishing in 10th place.

Marcelo Bielsa still extended his contract with the Chile national team until 2015. Bielsa stated that he would leave his position if Jorge Segovia were elected as President of the Chilean Football Federation. He followed through on this threat, despite Segovia's election being annulled, and resigned in February 2011. Claudio Borghi then became Chile's manager in March 2011. At the 2011 Copa América Chile was upset by Venezuela in the quarterfinals and after a string of bad performances and harsh criticisms, Claudio Borghi stepped down as Chile's manager in November 2012.

==== Consolidation of the golden generation (2013−2017) ====
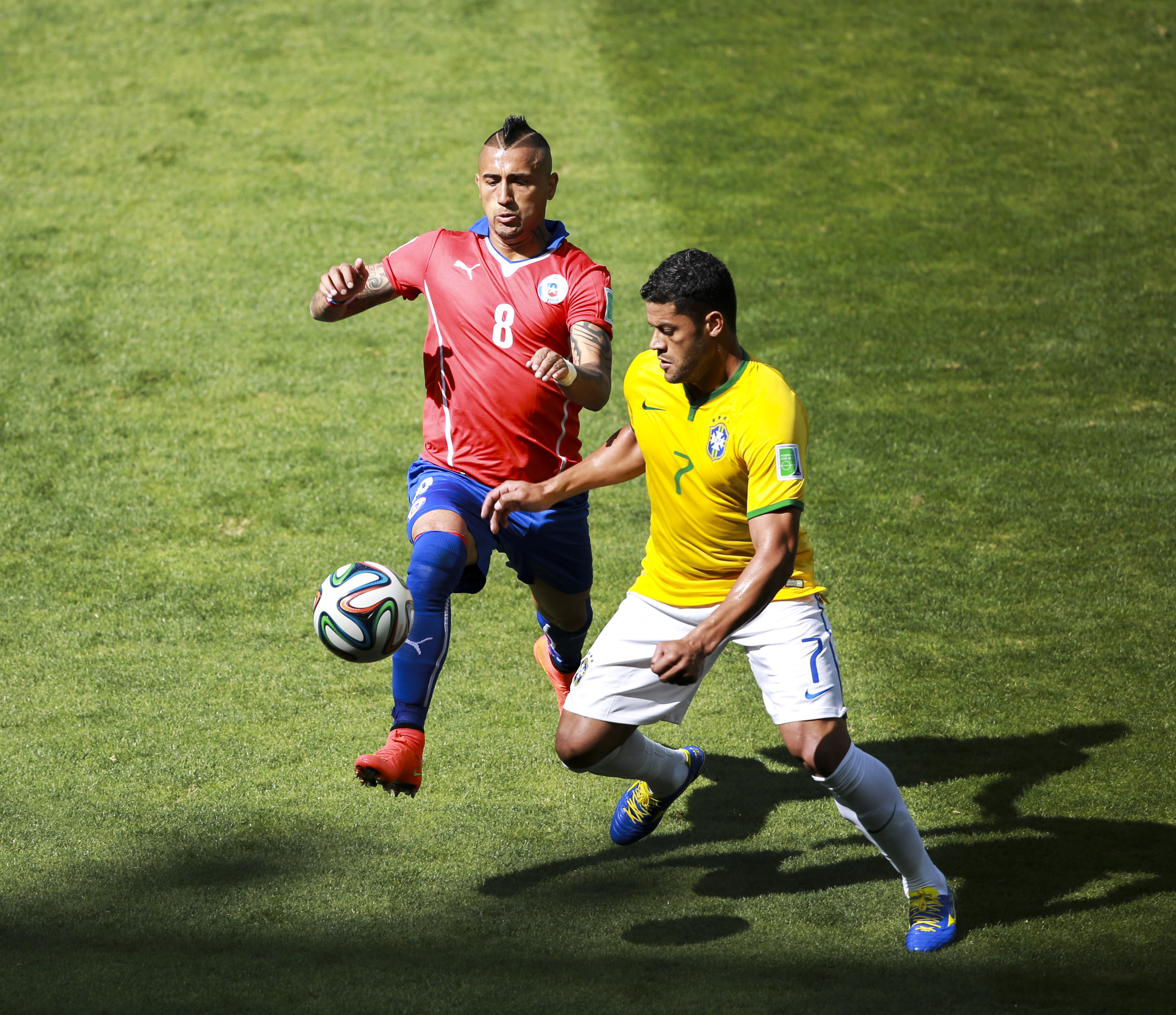
Chile playing against Brazil in the 2014 FIFA World Cup Round of 16. Arturo Vidal and Hulk in front

A new manager, Jorge Sampaoli, was appointed in December 2012. A disciple of Marcelo Bielsa, Jorge Sampaoli broke new records for La Roja by winning 10, drawing 3, and losing only 3 of 15 games as the head coach of the Chile national team. His coaching era witnessed a rise of the golden generation of Chilean football, with numerous talents such as Alexis Sanchez, Arturo Vidal, Claudio Bravo, Gary Medel, Eduardo Vargas, Mauricio Isla, Jorge Valdivia, Matías Fernández, Charles Aránguiz, Jean Beausejour, and Marcelo Díaz among others reaching their prime.

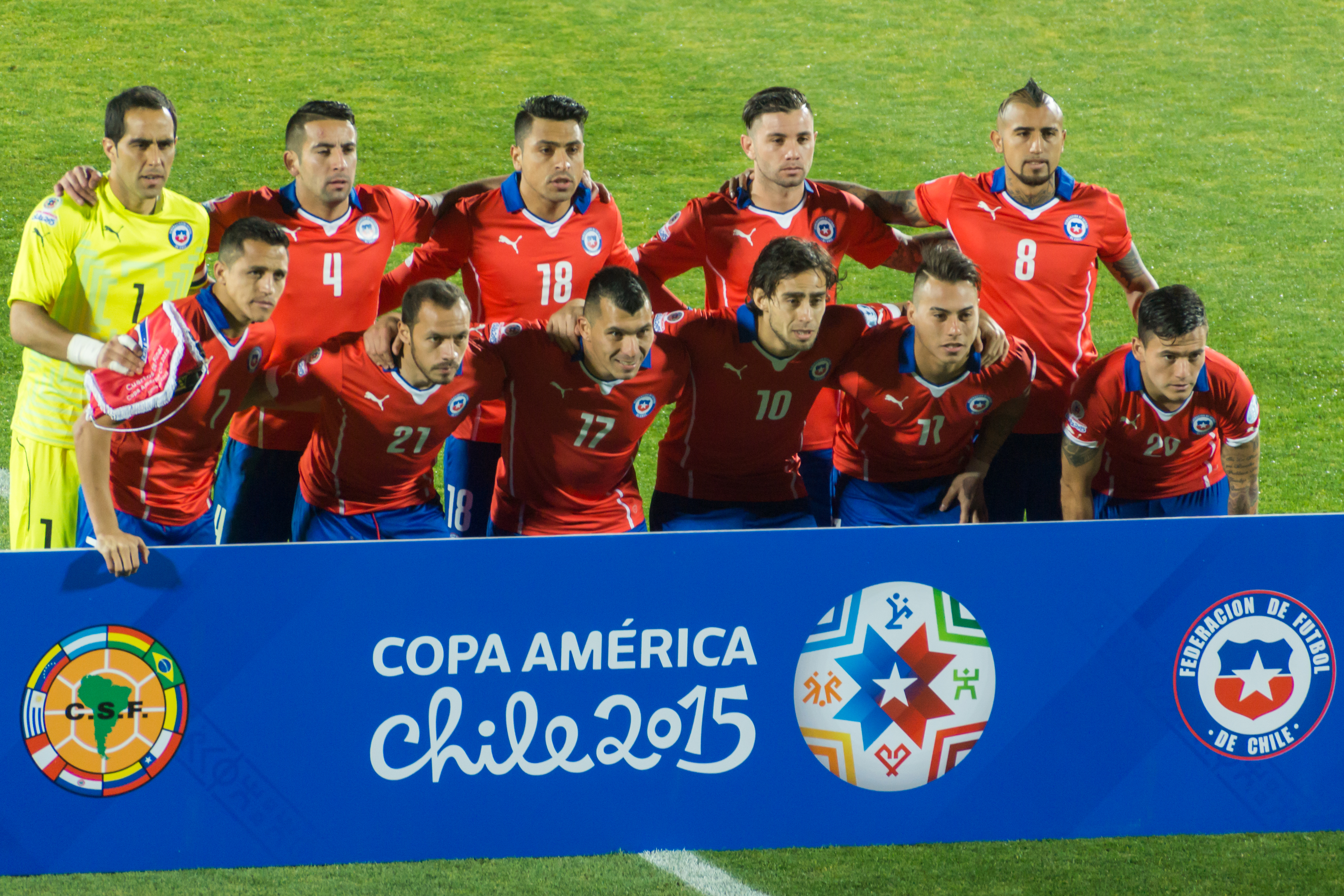
Chile vs Uruguay at the 2015 Copa America as hosts and first time champions

With Sampaoli, Chile were able to qualify for 2014 FIFA World Cup by finishing third in the qualifier. The team caused a strong impression by eliminating the defending champion Spain by 2–0 win with goals from Vargas and Aranguiz. Chile also won at the group stage 3–1 against Australia with Beausejour scoring for the second time in a row in a World Cup, a record, and reaching the round of 16, despite losing 0–2 to the Netherlands. Chile held a dramatic 1–1 draw against the host nation Brazil after a powerful shot from Mauricio Pinilla that hit the post in the 119th minute of extra time. Then only lost 2–3 on the penalty shoot-out, eventually ranked as 9th in the tournament. This ment the third time in a row that Chile lost to Brazil in the round of 16 after their participation in the 1998, 2010 and 2014 World Cups.

At the 2015 Copa América where Chile was the host, the team won their first game against Ecuador, with 2–0 win. In their second game, Chile drew 3–3 against Mexico. Chile advanced to the knockout stage as Group A winners with 7 points and most goals scored of any team in the tournament (10). The team later defeated the defending champion Uruguay in the quarterfinals and Peru in the semi-finals. In the final, Chile defeated Argentina on penalties (4–1) after a 0–0 draw, to win their first Copa America title.

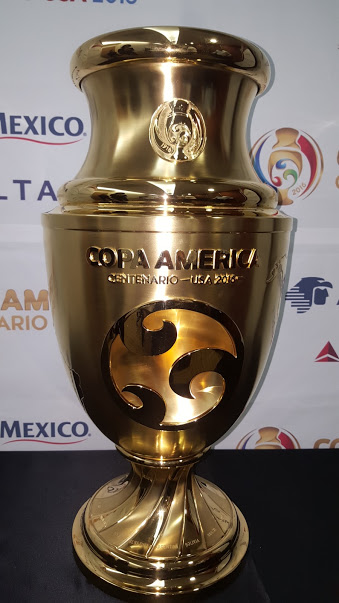
Copa America Centenario trophy

In January 2016, just six months after winning the 2015 Copa America, Jorge Sampaoli stepped down as Chile's manager. A new manager, the Argentinean Juan Antonio Pizzi, was appointed at the end of the same month, who then led La Roja to a new Copa América Centenario. The competition was a celebration of the centennial of CONMEBOL and included CONCACAF as a special edition expanded to sixteen teams. The team defeated Panama and Bolivia to advance to the quarterfinals, where they faced Mexico in an epic 7–0 victory. In the semifinals, they defeated Colombia 2–0 and, after beating Argentina again in the final by penalty shots, they were crowned champions. This would make such an impact in Argentina that made Lionel Messi retired from international football. Alexis Sánchez won the golden ball award, Eduardo Vargas the golden boot award, and Claudio Bravo the golden glove award.

==== Decline (2017−2019) ====
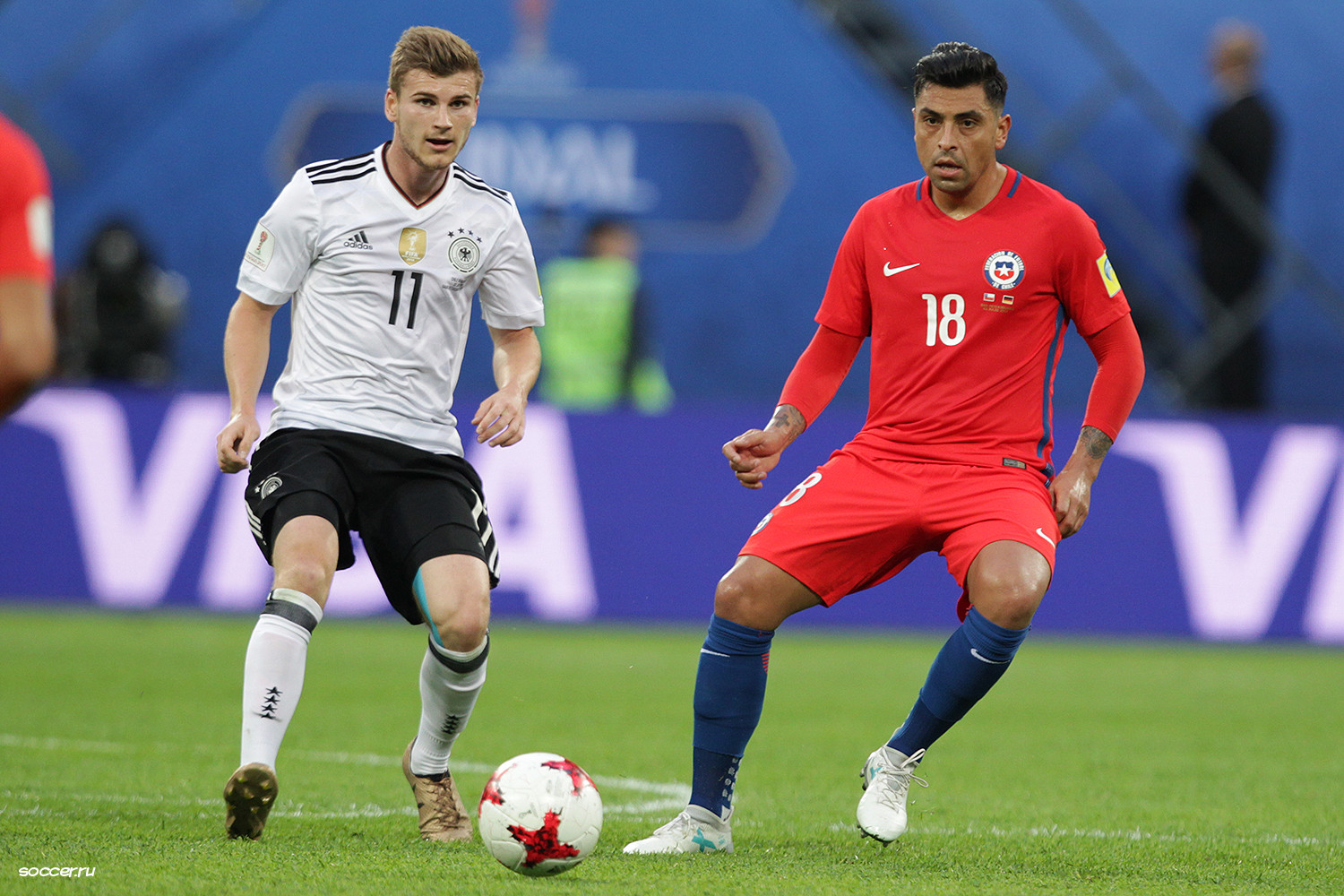
Chile vs Germany at the 2017 FIFA Confederations Cup final. Gonzalo Jara and Timo Werner in front.

At the 2017 FIFA Confederations Cup held in Russia, for which they had qualified by winning the Copa America, Chile won their first group stage match against Cameroon with 2–0 being the score. In their second match against the Germany, Chile drew 1–1 in a tense match. In their final game of the group stage against Australia, Chile drew once again but qualified to the knockout stage, being in second place with five points. In the semis, after a tense and exciting match, Chile came out on top, beating Portugal on the penalty shoot-out, 3–0 and hence they qualified for the 2017 FIFA Confederations Cup Final. In their first ever final in a FIFA tournament, Chile faced Germany again and lost 0–1 after a critical unforced error by Marcelo Díaz.

On 10 October 2017, after losing 0–3 to Brazil in the last match of 2018 FIFA World Cup qualifier, Chile failed to qualify for the 2018 FIFA World Cup, causing an end to what was perceived as their "golden generation".

The qualification process generated significant controversy due to the scandal involving the Bolivian national team, which fielded a Paraguayan player who had been irregularly naturalized as Bolivian. Chile had drawn with Bolivia, and Peru had lost; however, FIFA decided to penalize Bolivia by awarding them both matches as losses. This resulted in Chile receiving two additional points and Peru three. Ultimately, this decision penalized Chile, placing them sixth in the round-robin after losing on overall goal difference to Peru. They ended up being the highest-ranked team by Fifa (9th) to fail to qualify for the World Cup. Juan Antonio Pizzi also resigned after failing to help Chile qualify for the tournament.

At the 2019 Copa America, in the group stage, Chile defeated Japan and Ecuador to advance to the quarterfinals, where they defeated Colombia on penalties. They ultimately lost in the semifinals to a strong Peru, marking the end of this generation's successful international run.

=== Struggles in generational change (2019−present) ===
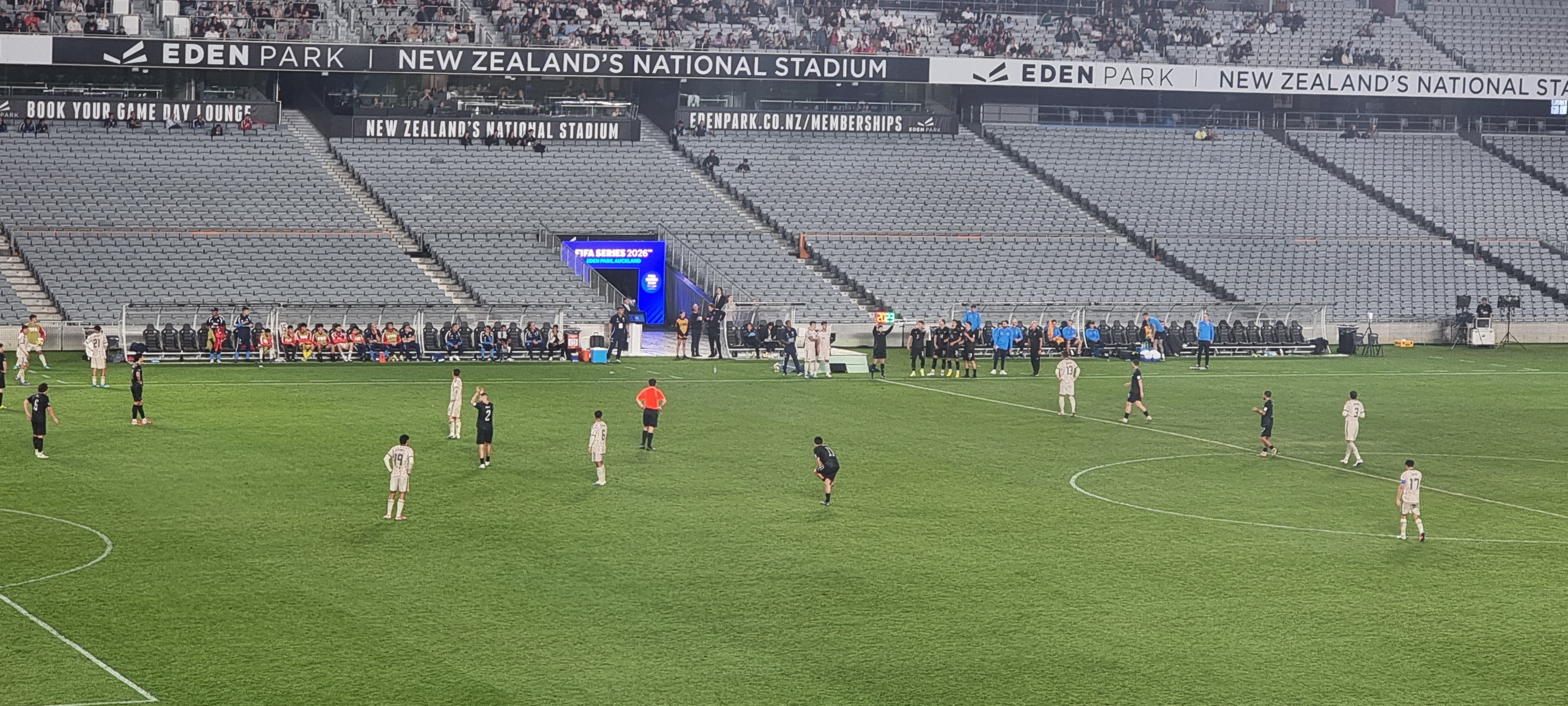
Match between New Zealand and Chile in March 2026. Chile became the first South American team to ever lose to New Zealand.

At the 2021 Copa America, Chile advanced to the quarter-finals, where the team lost 0–1 to Brazil. Chile also failed to qualify for the 2022 FIFA World Cup, finishing seventh in the standings with five wins, four draws, and nine losses.

At the 2024 Copa America, Chile was eliminated in the group stage for the first time since 2004 with only 2 points and was unable to score a goal in the tournament. The 2026 FIFA World Cup qualifier was one of the Chilean's worst qualifiers when the team failed to qualify for the third straight World Cup by standing at the bottom with only two wins, five draws and eleven losses.

== Team image ==
The team's home kit consists of a red jersey, blue shorts, and either red or white socks. The away jersey, meanwhile, features a white jersey, white shorts, and blue socks. The color scheme of red, white, and blue that was featured in the 1947 South American Championship, the precursor of the Copa América, has remained in place since. In 2016, red shorts were introduced as an option for the first time.

In August 2010, Puma acquired the contract to be the official kit supplier for the Chilean team from 2011 to 2015, paying US$ 3 million per year, also providing referees' kits and balls for domestic club competitions. The previous kit supplier, from 2004 to 2010 including the 2010 World Cup, was Brooks Sports.

Puma company ended its link after the 2015 Copa América with the tender for the new brand that will outfit the team since August 2015. This procedure was won by the American company Nike. The contract with Nike was supposed to last until the 2022 FIFA World Cup, but ended prematurely when the Chilean Football Federation sued Nike for missing payments in 2021. This dispute lead to Chile blocking the Nike patch with a flag during the 2021 Copa América. On 1 September 2021, Adidas were announced as the national team kit supplier until 2026. On June 18, 2026, it was confirmed that Marathon would be the official kit supplier for the national team starting in 2027.

=== Kit sponsorship ===
Kit supplier	Period
(Germany) Adidas	1979–1983
(Brazil) Penalty	1984
(Germany) Puma	1985
(United Kingdom) Umbro	1986
(Switzerland) Power	1987
(Germany) Puma	1987–1988
(Germany) Adidas	1988–1990
(United Kingdom) Umbro	1990–1991
(United States) Avia	1992
(Germany) Adidas	1993–1994
(Brazil) Rhumell	1995
(United States) Reebok	1996–2000
(United Kingdom) Umbro	2000–2003
(United States) Brooks	2003–2010
(Germany) Puma	2010–2015
(United States) Nike	2015–2021
(Germany) Adidas	2021–2026
(Ecuador) Marathon	2027–

== Home stadium ==
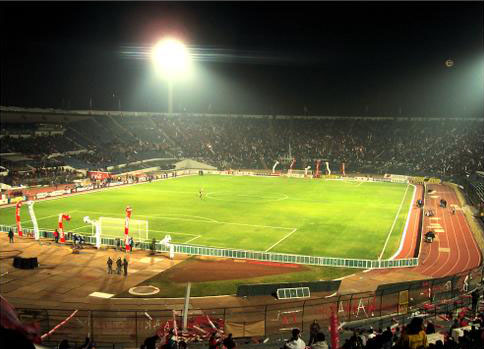
Estadio Nacional at night.

The Chile national team plays their qualifying matches at the Estadio Nacional Julio Martínez Prádanos located in Santiago, Chile and can be found at the commune of Ñuñoa. The construction of the stadium began in February 1937, and opened on 3 December 1938. The current official registered capacity is of 49,000 spectators, but has surpassed the 75,000 mark on many occasions when the match is of high demand. An example would be the 1962 FIFA World Cup semi-final match Chile vs. Brazil, where over 76,000 spectators viewed the game. The highest attendance ever was 85,262 on 26 December 1962, for a game between Universidad Católica and Universidad de Chile.

It has hosted four Copa América finals, the final of the 1962 FIFA World Cup and the final to the 1987 FIFA World Youth Championship.

== Rivalries ==
The Chile national team has no special rivalry in South America or at Latin American level; however, two matches are considered important, although neither is a special rivalry: those are against Argentina and Peru.

=== Peru ===
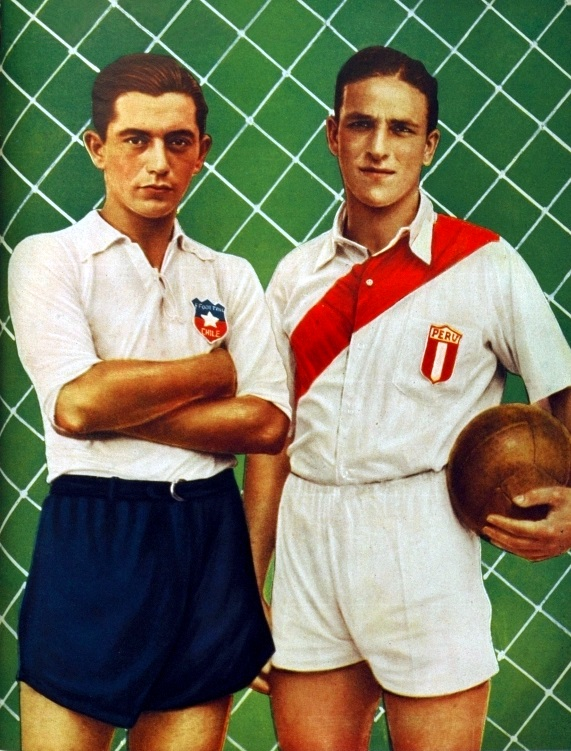
Chile's Raúl Toro and Peru's Teodoro Fernández, opponents in the 1937 South American Championship.

The Chile–Peru football rivalry is known in Spanish as the Clásico del Pacífico ("Pacific Derby"). The rivalry is considered to be one of the fiercest rivalries in the world, with CNN World Sport editor Greg Duke ranking it among the top ten football rivalries in the world. The rivalry between Chile and Peru stems from historical politics, border disputes, and the War of the Pacific, with the rivalry producing some of the most intense matches in South American footballing history.

Chile first faced Peru in the 1935 South American Championship, losing 1–0.

== Sponsors ==
- ACHS (2023–2026)
- Adidas (since 2021)
- BCI (2023–2026)
- Mega (TV broadcaster of Chile's qualifying and friendly matches) (2026–2030)
- Cristal (since 2007)
- Gatorade (2023–2026)
- McDonald's (2023–2026)
- MG Motor (2023–2026)
- PedidosYa (2023–2026)
- SꓘY (2023–2026)
- Copec (2026–2030)
- Banco Falabella (2026–2030)

== Results and fixtures ==
The following is a list of match results in the last 12 months, as well as any future matches that have been scheduled.

Win Draw Loss Fixture

=== 2025 ===
15 November Friendly	Russia	0–2	Chile	Sochi, Russia
20:00 UTC+3		Report	Tapia 37'; Brereton Díaz 76'	Stadium: Fisht Olympic Stadium; Attendance: 32,779; Referee: Firdavs Norsafarov (Uzbekistan)

18 November Friendly	Peru	1–2	Chile	Sochi, Russia
20:00 UTC+3	Valera 34' (pen.)	Report	Loyola 53'; Osorio 60'	Stadium: Fisht Olympic Stadium; Attendance: 4,000; Referee: Kirill Levnikov (Russia)

=== 2026 ===
27 March 2026 FIFA Series	Chile	4–2	Cape Verde	Auckland, New Zealand
16:00 UTC+13	Brereton Díaz 16'; Gutiérrez 58'; Loyola 67'; Tapia 79'	Report	Livramento 21'; Diney (red card) 43'; Sidny Cabral 45+3'	Stadium: Eden Park; Attendance: 14,000; Referee: Calvin Berg (New Zealand)

30 March 2026 FIFA Series	New Zealand	4–1	Chile	Auckland, New Zealand
19:00 UTC+13	Barbarouses 31'; Just 40'; Randall 60'; Waine 71'	Report	Osorio (yellow card) 23' (yellow-red card) 27'; Tapia 83'	Stadium: Eden Park; Attendance: 14,327; Referee: Jack Morgan (Australia)

6 June Friendly	Portugal	2–1	Chile	Oeiras, Portugal
18:45 UTC+1	Guedes 58'; Fernandes 75'	Report	Cepeda 90+2'	Stadium: Estádio Nacional; Attendance: 37,500; Referee: Luca Zufferli (Italy)

9 June Friendly	DR Congo	1–2	Chile	Orléans, France
18:00 UTC+2	Kayembe 88'	Report	Osorio 51'; Sepúlveda 86'	Stadium: Stade de la Source; Attendance: 0 (BCD); Referee: Mehrez Melki (Tunisia)
Note: Originally, match cancelled due to La Línea de la Concepción's mayoral ban related to the 2026 Central Africa Ebola epidemic, but relocated in Orléans.

26 September Friendly	Canada	1–0	Chile	Toronto, Canada
19:00 UTC−4	J. David 12'	Report		Stadium: BMO Field; Attendance: 23,310; Referee: Marco Ortíz (Mexico)

29 September Friendly	United States	4–2	Chile	St. Louis, United States
19:00 UTC−5	Berhalter 37'; Hall 51'; Richards 72'; Albert 90+3'	Report	Ulloa 45+1'; Gutiérrez 49'	Stadium: Energizer Park; Attendance: 21,680; Referee: Jorge Camacho (Mexico)

6 October Friendly	Mexico	0–2	Chile	Los Angeles, United States
19:30 UTC−7		Report	Gutiérrez 54'; Pizarro 65'	Stadium: Los Angeles Memorial Coliseum; Attendance: 56,529; Referee: Filip Dujic (Canada)

13 November Friendly	Colombia	1–0	Chile	Cali, Colombia
19:00 UTC−5	Maripán 35' (o.g.)	Report		Stadium: Estadio Olímpico Pascual Guerrero; Referee: Augusto Aragón (Ecuador)

17 November Friendly	Chile	0–0	Colombia	Santiago, Chile
20:00 UTC−3		Report		Stadium: Estadio Nacional Julio Martínez Prádanos; Referee: Augusto Aragón (Ecuador)

== Coaching staff ==
As of 31 December 2025

Position	Name
Head coach	(Chile) Nicolás Córdova
Assistant coaches	(Chile) César Cortés (Chile) Ariel Leporati
Fitness coach	(Chile) Sebastián Rojas Inda
Goalkeeping coach	(Chile) Bruno Vásquez
Doctor	Vacant
Physiotherapist	Vacant

== Players ==
=== Current squad ===
The following players were called up to the squad for the friendly matches against Colombia on 13 and 17 November 2026.
Caps and goals updated as of 17 November 2026, after the match against Colombia.

No.	Pos.	Player	Date of birth (age)	Caps	Goals	Club
1	GK	Christian Bravo	19 July 2006 (age 20)	0	0	(Football Federation of Chile) Huachipato
12	GK	Lawrence Vigouroux	19 November 1993 (age 33)	14	0	(Football Association of Wales) Swansea City
23	GK	Brayan Cortés	11 March 1995 (age 31)	25	0	(Argentine Football Association) Argentinos Juniors
2	DF	Felipe Faúndez	27 March 2006 (age 20)	6	0	(Football Federation of Chile) O'Higgins
3	DF	Guillermo Maripán	6 May 1994 (age 32)	63	2	(Brazilian Football Confederation) Internacional
4	DF	Iván Román	12 July 2006 (age 20)	8	0	(Football Federation of Chile) Colo-Colo
5	DF	José Movillo	8 November 2006 (age 20)	0	0	(Football Federation of Chile) O'Higgins
13	DF	Thomas Coulombe	July 5, 2007 (age 19)	1	0	(Royal Spanish Football Federation) Espanyol B
17	DF	Gabriel Suazo (captain)	9 August 1997 (age 29)	48	0	(Royal Spanish Football Federation) Sevilla
27	DF	Jonathan Villagra	28 March 2001 (age 25)	5	0	(Football Federation of Chile) Colo-Colo
6	MF	Vicente Pizarro	5 November 2002 (age 24)	22	1	(Argentine Football Association) Rosario Central
8	MF	Felipe Loyola	9 November 2000 (age 26)	25	2	(Italian Football Federation) Pisa
10	MF	Agustín Arce	24 January 2005 (age 21)	4	0	(Football Federation of Chile) Universidad de Chile
14	MF	Felipe Méndez	23 September 1999 (age 27)	17	0	(Football Federation of Chile) Colo-Colo
15	MF	César Pérez	29 November 2002 (age 23)	8	0	(Argentine Football Association) Defensa y Justicia
18	MF	Rodrigo Echeverría	17 April 1995 (age 31)	36	1	(Mexican Football Federation) León
19	MF	Nils Reichmuth	22 February 2002 (age 24)	5	0	(Swiss Football Association) Thun
21	MF	Williams Alarcón	29 November 2000 (age 25)	7	0	(Argentine Football Association) Boca Juniors
7	FW	Lucas Cepeda	31 October 2002 (age 24)	20	4	(Royal Spanish Football Federation) Elche
9	FW	Maximiliano Gutiérrez	3 May 2004 (age 22)	12	4	(Russian Football Union) Dynamo Moscow
11	FW	Darío Osorio	24 January 2004 (age 22)	30	3	(The Football Association) Crystal Palace
16	FW	Gonzalo Tapia	18 February 2002 (age 24)	17	3	(United States Soccer Federation) Columbus Crew
20	FW	Clemente Montes	25 April 2001 (age 25)	5	0	(Football Federation of Chile) Universidad Católica
22	FW	Ben Brereton Díaz	18 April 1999 (age 27)	47	10	(The Football Association) Sheffield United
25	FW	Emiliano Ramos	8 March 2005 (age 21)	1	0	(Football Federation of Chile) Everton

=== Recent call-ups ===
The following players have been called up in the last twelve months.

Pos.	Player	Date of birth (age)	Caps	Goals	Club	Latest call-up
GK	Thomas Gillier	28 May 2004 (age 22)	0	0	(Canada) Montréal	v. DR Congo, 9 June 2026
GK	Vicente Bernedo	22 January 2001 (age 25)	0	0	(Chile) Universidad Católica	Microcycle, 11–12 May 2026
GK	Gonzalo Flores	29 February 2000 (age 26)	0	0	(Chile) Coquimbo Unido	Microcycle, 11–12 May 2026
GK	Jaime Vargas	28 October 2004 (age 22)	0	0	(Chile) Recoleta	Microcycle, 11–12 May 2026
GK	José Alburquenque ^{TRP}	19 July 2007 (age 19)	0	0	Universidad de Chile	Microcycle, 11–12 May 2026
GK	Maximiliano Mateluna ^{TRP}	9 December 2007 (age 18)	0	0	(Chile) Palestino	Microcycle, 11–12 May 2026
GK	Sebastián Mella	31 July 2005 (age 21)	0	0	(Chile) Huachipato	v. New Zealand, 30 March 2026
DF	Diego Ulloa	16 June 2003 (age 23)	6	1	(Chile) Colo-Colo	v. Colombia, 17 November 2026 ^{INJ}
DF	Paulo Díaz	25 August 1994 (age 32)	58	1	(United States) Atlanta United	v. Colombia, 13 November 2026 ^{INJ}
DF	Benjamín Kuscevic	2 May 1996 (age 30)	16	0	(Canada) Toronto	v. Colombia, 13 November 2026 ^{INJ}
DF	Igor Lichnovsky	7 March 1994 (age 32)	17	0	Universidad de Chile	v. Mexico, 6 October 2026
DF	Francisco Salinas	4 December 1999 (age 26)	4	0	(Chile) Coquimbo Unido	v. Mexico, 6 October 2026
DF	Marcelo Morales	6 June 2003 (age 23)	3	0	Universidad de Chile	v. Mexico, 6 October 2026
DF	Francisco Sierralta	6 May 1997 (age 29)	20	0	(Poland) Piast Gliwice	v. DR Congo, 9 June 2026
DF	Fabián Hormazábal	26 April 1996 (age 30)	10	0	Universidad de Chile	v. DR Congo, 9 June 2026
DF	Matías Pérez	13 April 2005 (age 21)	0	0	(Chile) La Serena	v. Portugal, 6 June 2026 ^{WD}
DF	Ian Garguez	3 February 2005 (age 21)	4	0	(Chile) Palestino	v. New Zealand, 30 March 2026
MF	Matías Sepúlveda	12 March 1999 (age 27)	3	1	(Argentina) Lanús	v. Mexico, 6 October 2026
MF	Leandro Hernández	13 June 2005 (age 21)	1	0	(Chile) Colo-Colo	v. Mexico, 6 October 2026
MF	Jetzen Lopez ^{TRP}	14 January 2007 (age 19)	0	0	(Portugal) Braga U23	v. Mexico, 6 October 2026
MF	Marcelino Núñez	1 March 2000 (age 26)	34	5	(England) Ipswich Town	v. Mexico, 6 October 2026 ^{WD}
MF	Lautaro Millán	16 August 2005 (age 21)	4	0	(Argentina) Independiente	v. DR Congo, 9 June 2026
MF	Ignacio Saavedra	12 January 1999 (age 27)	6	0	(Russia) Rubin Kazan	v. Portugal, 6 June 2026 ^{INJ}
MF	Javier Altamirano	21 August 1999 (age 27)	8	0	Universidad de Chile	v. New Zealand, 30 March 2026
MF	Benjamín Chandía	25 November 2002 (age 23)	1	0	(Chile) Coquimbo Unido	v. New Zealand, 30 March 2026
MF	Felipe Ogaz	7 May 2003 (age 23)	0	0	(Chile) O'Higgins	v. New Zealand, 30 March 2026
FW	Zidane Yáñez ^{TRP}	26 January 2008 (age 18)	0	0	(United States) Huntsville City	v. Mexico, 6 October 2026
FW	Iván Morales	29 July 1999 (age 27)	7	1	(Argentina) Independiente	v. DR Congo, 9 June 2026
FW	Alexander Aravena	6 September 2002 (age 24)	16	0	(United States) Portland Timbers	v. New Zealand, 30 March 2026
^{RET} Retired from the national team; ^{INJ} Withdrew from the squad due to injury; ^{PRE} Preliminary squad; ^{SUS} Withdrew from the squad due to suspension; ^{WD} Withdrew from the squad for non-injury related reasons.; ^{TRP} Invited as a Training player

== Player records ==
As of 10 June 2025
Players in bold are still active with Chile.

=== Most appearances ===
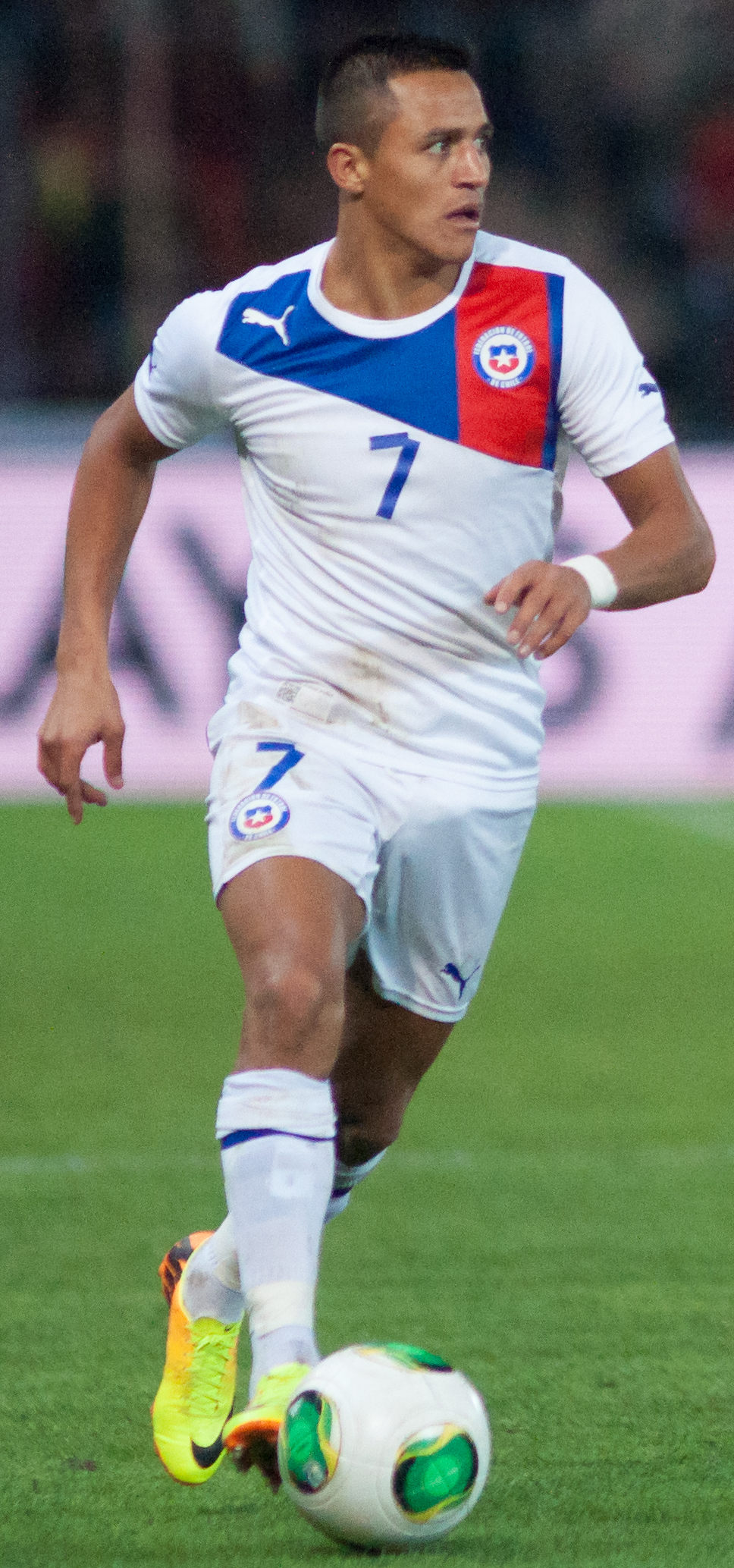
Alexis Sánchez is Chile's top goalscorer and their most capped player.

Rank	Player	Caps	Goals	Career
1	**Alexis Sánchez**	168	51	2006–
2	Gary Medel	161	7	2007–2023
3	Claudio Bravo	150	0	2004–2024
4	**Arturo Vidal**	147	34	2007–
5	Mauricio Isla	145	5	2007–2025
6	**Eduardo Vargas**	120	45	2009–
7	Gonzalo Jara	115	3	2006–2019
8	Jean Beausejour	109	6	2004–2021
9	**Charles Aránguiz**	103	7	2009–
10	Leonel Sánchez	85	24	1955–1968

=== Top goalscorers ===
Rank	Player	Goals	Caps	Ratio	Career
1	**Alexis Sánchez** (list)	51	168	0.30	2006–
2	**Eduardo Vargas**	45	120	0.38	2009–
3	Marcelo Salas	37	70	0.53	1994–2007
4	Iván Zamorano	34	69	0.49	1987–2001
4	**Arturo Vidal**	34	147	0.23	2007–
6	Carlos Caszely	29	49	0.59	1969–1985
7	Leonel Sánchez	24	85	0.28	1955–1968
8	Jorge Aravena	22	37	0.59	1983–1990
9	Humberto Suazo	21	60	0.35	2005–2013
10	Juan Carlos Letelier	18	57	0.32	1979–1989

=== Captains ===
- Sergio Navarro (1961–1962)
- Leonel Sánchez (1963–1969)
- Francisco Valdés (1969–1974)
- Elías Figueroa (1974–1982)
- Carlos Caszely (1982–1985)
- Roberto Rojas (1985–1989)
- Jaime Pizarro (1990–1993)
- Iván Zamorano (1993–2001)
- Marcelo Salas (2001–2007)
- David Pizarro (2002–2005)
- Claudio Bravo (2008–2024)
- Gary Medel (2018-2021)
- Alexis Sánchez (2024–2025)
- **Gabriel Suazo** (2025–present)

== Competitive record ==
=== FIFA World Cup ===
Champions Runners-up Third place Fourth place

FIFA World Cup record										Qualification record					
Year	Round	Position	Pld	W	D	L	GF	GA	Squad	Pld	W	D	L	GF	GA
(Uruguay) 1930	Group stage	5th	3	2	0	1	5	3	Squad	Qualified as invitees					
(Italy) 1934	Withdrew									Withdrew					
(France) 1938	Withdrew									Withdrew					
(Brazil) 1950	Group stage	9th	3	1	0	2	5	6	Squad	Qualified automatically					
(Switzerland) 1954	Did not qualify									4	0	0	4	1	10
(Sweden) 1958	Did not qualify									4	1	0	3	2	10
(Chile) 1962	Third place	3rd	6	4	0	2	10	8	Squad	Qualified as hosts					
(England) 1966	Group stage	13th	3	0	1	2	2	5	Squad	5	3	1	1	14	8
(Mexico) 1970	Did not qualify									4	1	2	1	5	4
(West Germany) 1974	Group stage	11th	3	0	2	1	1	2	Squad	5	3	1	1	6	3
(Argentina) 1978	Did not qualify									4	2	1	1	5	3
(Spain) 1982	Group stage	22nd	3	0	0	3	3	8	Squad	4	3	1	0	6	0
(Mexico) 1986	Did not qualify									8	4	2	2	17	12
(Italy) 1990	Did not qualify									4	2	1	1	9	4
(United States) 1994	Banned									Banned					
(France) 1998	Round of 16	16th	4	0	3	1	5	8	Squad	16	7	4	5	32	18
(South Korea) (Japan) 2002	Did not qualify									18	3	3	12	15	27
(Germany) 2006	Did not qualify									18	5	7	6	18	22
(South Africa) 2010	Round of 16	10th	4	2	0	2	3	5	Squad	18	10	3	5	32	22
(Brazil) 2014	Round of 16	9th	4	2	1	1	6	4	Squad	16	9	1	6	29	25
(Russia) 2018	Did not qualify									18	8	2	8	26	27
(Qatar) 2022	Did not qualify									18	5	4	9	19	26
(Canada) (Mexico) (United States) 2026	Did not qualify									18	2	5	11	9	27
(Morocco) (Portugal) (Spain) 2030	To be determined									To be determined					
(Saudi Arabia) 2034	To be determined									To be determined					
Total	Third place	9/23	33	11	7	15	40	49	—	182	68	38	76	245	248

=== Copa América ===
South American Championship / Copa América record
Year	Round	Position	Pld	W	D	L	GF	GA	Squad
(Argentina) 1916	Fourth place	4th	3	0	1	2	2	11	Squad
(Uruguay) 1917	Fourth place	4th	3	0	0	3	0	10	Squad
(Brazil) 1919	Fourth place	4th	3	0	0	3	1	12	Squad
(Chile) 1920	Fourth place	4th	3	0	1	2	2	4	Squad
(Argentina) 1921	Withdrew								
(Brazil) 1922	Fifth place	5th	4	0	1	3	1	10	Squad
(Uruguay) 1923	Withdrew								
(Uruguay) 1924	Fourth place	4th	3	0	0	3	1	10	Squad
(Argentina) 1925	Withdrew								
(Chile) 1926	Third place	3rd	4	2	1	1	14	6	Squad
(Peru) 1927	Withdrew								
(Argentina) 1929	Did not participate								
(Peru) 1935	Fourth place	4th	3	0	0	3	2	7	Squad
(Argentina) 1937	Fifth place	5th	5	1	1	3	12	13	Squad
(Peru) 1939	Fourth place	4th	4	1	0	3	8	12	Squad
(Chile) 1941	Third place	3rd	4	2	0	2	6	3	Squad
(Uruguay) 1942	Sixth place	6th	6	1	1	4	4	15	Squad
(Chile) 1945	Third place	3rd	6	4	1	1	15	5	Squad
(Argentina) 1946	Fifth place	5th	5	2	0	3	8	11	Squad
(Ecuador) 1947	Fourth place	4th	7	4	1	2	14	13	Squad
(Brazil) 1949	Fifth place	5th	7	2	1	4	10	14	Squad
(Peru) 1953	Fourth place	4th	6	3	1	2	10	10	Squad
(Chile) 1955	Runners-up	2nd	5	3	1	1	19	8	Squad
(Uruguay) 1956	Runners-up	2nd	5	3	0	2	11	8	Squad
(Peru) 1957	Sixth place	6th	6	1	1	4	9	17	Squad
(Argentina) 1959	Fifth place	5th	6	2	1	3	9	14	Squad
(Ecuador) 1959	Did not participate								
(Bolivia) 1963	Did not participate								
(Uruguay) 1967	Third place	3rd	5	2	2	1	8	6	Squad
1975	Group stage	6th	4	1	1	2	7	6	Squad
1979	Runners-up	2nd	9	4	3	2	13	6	Squad
1983	Group stage	5th	4	2	1	1	8	2	Squad
(Argentina) 1987	Runners-up	2nd	4	3	0	1	9	3	Squad
(Brazil) 1989	Group stage	5th	4	2	0	2	7	5	Squad
(Chile) 1991	Third place	3rd	7	3	2	2	11	6	Squad
(Ecuador) 1993	Group stage	9th	3	1	0	2	3	4	Squad
(Uruguay) 1995	Group stage	11th	3	0	1	2	3	8	Squad
(Bolivia) 1997	Group stage	11th	3	0	0	3	1	5	Squad
(Paraguay) 1999	Fourth place	4th	6	2	1	3	8	7	Squad
(Colombia) 2001	Quarter-finals	7th	4	2	0	2	5	5	Squad
(Peru) 2004	Group stage	10th	3	0	1	2	2	4	Squad
(Venezuela) 2007	Quarter-finals	8th	4	1	1	2	4	11	Squad
(Argentina) 2011	Quarter-finals	5th	4	2	1	1	5	4	Squad
(Chile) 2015	Champions	1st	6	4	2	0	13	4	Squad
(United States) 2016	Champions	1st	6	4	1	1	16	5	Squad
(Brazil) 2019	Fourth place	4th	6	2	1	3	7	7	Squad
(Brazil) 2021	Quarter-finals	7th	5	1	2	2	3	5	Squad
(United States) 2024	Group stage	12th	3	0	2	1	0	1	Squad
Total	2 Titles	41/48	191	67	35	89	291	317	—

=== FIFA Confederations Cup ===
FIFA Confederations Cup record
Year	Round	Position	Pld	W	D	L	GF	GA	Squad
(Saudi Arabia) 1992	Did not qualify								
(Saudi Arabia) 1995	Did not qualify								
(Saudi Arabia) 1997	Did not qualify								
(Mexico) 1999	Did not qualify								
(South Korea) (Japan) 2001	Did not qualify								
(France) 2003	Did not qualify								
(Germany) 2005	Did not qualify								
(South Africa) 2009	Did not qualify								
(Brazil) 2013	Did not qualify								
(Russia) 2017	Runners-up	2nd	5	1	3	1	4	3	Squad
Total	Runners-up	1/10	5	1	3	1	4	3	—

=== Olympic Games ===
Olympic Games record
Year	Round	Position	Pld	W	D	L	GF	GA	Squad
(Greece) 1896	No football tournament								
(France) 1900	Only club teams participated								
(United States) 1904	Only club teams participated								
(United Kingdom) 1908	Did not participate								
(Sweden) 1912	Did not participate								
(Belgium) 1920	Did not participate								
(France) 1924	Did not participate								
(Netherlands) 1928	Preliminary round	17th	3	1	1	1	7	7	Squad
(United States) 1932	No football tournament								
(Nazi Germany) 1936	Withdrew								
(United Kingdom) 1948	Did not participate								
(Finland) 1952	Preliminary round	17th	1	0	0	1	4	5	Squad
(Australia) 1956	Did not participate								
(Italy) 1960	Did not qualify								
(Japan) 1964	Did not qualify								
(Mexico) 1968	Did not qualify								
(West Germany) 1972	Did not qualify								
(Canada) 1976	Did not qualify								
(Soviet Union) 1980	Did not qualify								
(United States) 1984	Quarter-finals	7th	4	1	2	1	2	2	Squad
(South Korea) 1988	Did not qualify								
Since 1992	See Chile national under-23 football team								
Total	Quarter-finals	3/19	8	6	3	5	27	20	—

=== Pan American Games ===
Pan American Games record
Year	Round	Position	Pld	W	D	L	GF	GA
(Argentina) 1951	Bronze medal	3rd	4	1	2	1	8	6
(Mexico) 1955	Did not participate							
(United States) 1959	Did not participate							
(Brazil) 1963	Bronze medal	3rd	4	2	1	1	12	6
(Canada) 1967	Did not participate							
(Colombia) 1971	Did not participate							
(Mexico) 1975	Did not participate							
(Puerto Rico) 1979	Did not participate							
(Venezuela) 1983	Round 1	4th	3	1	2	0	3	2
(United States) 1987	Silver medal	2nd	5	2	2	1	6	6
(Cuba) 1991	Did not participate							
(Argentina) 1995	Quarter-finals	7th	4	1	1	2	3	6
Since 1999	See Chile national under-23 football team							
Total	Silver medal	5/12	20	7	8	5	32	26

== Honours ==
=== Global ===
- FIFA World Cup
  - (bronze) Third place (1): 1962
- FIFA Confederations Cup
  - (silver) Runners-up (1): 2017

=== Continental ===
- South American Championship / Copa América
  - (gold) Champions (2): 2015, 2016
  - (silver) Runners-up (4): 1955, 1956, 1979, 1987
  - (bronze) Third place (5): 1926, 1941, 1945, 1967, 1991
- Panamerican Championship^{1}
  - (silver) Runners-up (1): 1952

=== Friendly ===
- Copa Bernardo O'Higgins (2): 1957, 1966^{s}
- Copa del Pacífico (7): 1965, 1968, 1971^{s}, 1983, 1988, 2006, 2012
- Copa Juan Pinto Durán (2): 1971, 1979
- Copa Carlos Dittborn (1): 1973
- Copa Leoncio Provoste (1): 1973
- Copa Acosta Ñu (1): 1974
- Indonesian Independence Cup (1): 1985
- Copa Teixeira (1): 1990^{s}
- Canada Cup (1): 1995
- Copa Ciudad de Valparaíso (1): 2000
- China Cup (1): 2017

=== Chronology of titles ===
Headquarters	Tournament	Year	N.º
Chile	Copa América	2015	1º
(United States) USA	Copa América	2016	2º

=== Summary ===
Competition	1st place, gold medalist(s)	2nd place, silver medalist(s)	3rd place, bronze medalist(s)	Total
FIFA World Cup	0	0	1	1
FIFA Confederations Cup	0	1	0	1
CONMEBOL Copa América	2	4	5	11
Panamerican Championship^{1}	0	1	0	1
Total	2	6	6	14

Notes

1. Official continental competition organized by PFC. It was a unified confederation of the Americas, which was formed by NAFC, CCCF and CONMEBOL.
- ^{s} Shared titles.

== See also ==
- Chile national under-23 football team
- Chile national under-20 football team
- Chile national under-17 football team
- Chile national futsal team
- South American Footballer of the Year

== Notes ==
- In 2010, Chicago-based rock band Manwomanchild released the song "Chile La Roja" in support of Chile's 2010 World Cup team.
