= Alexander Oroz =

Chilean footballer (born 2002)

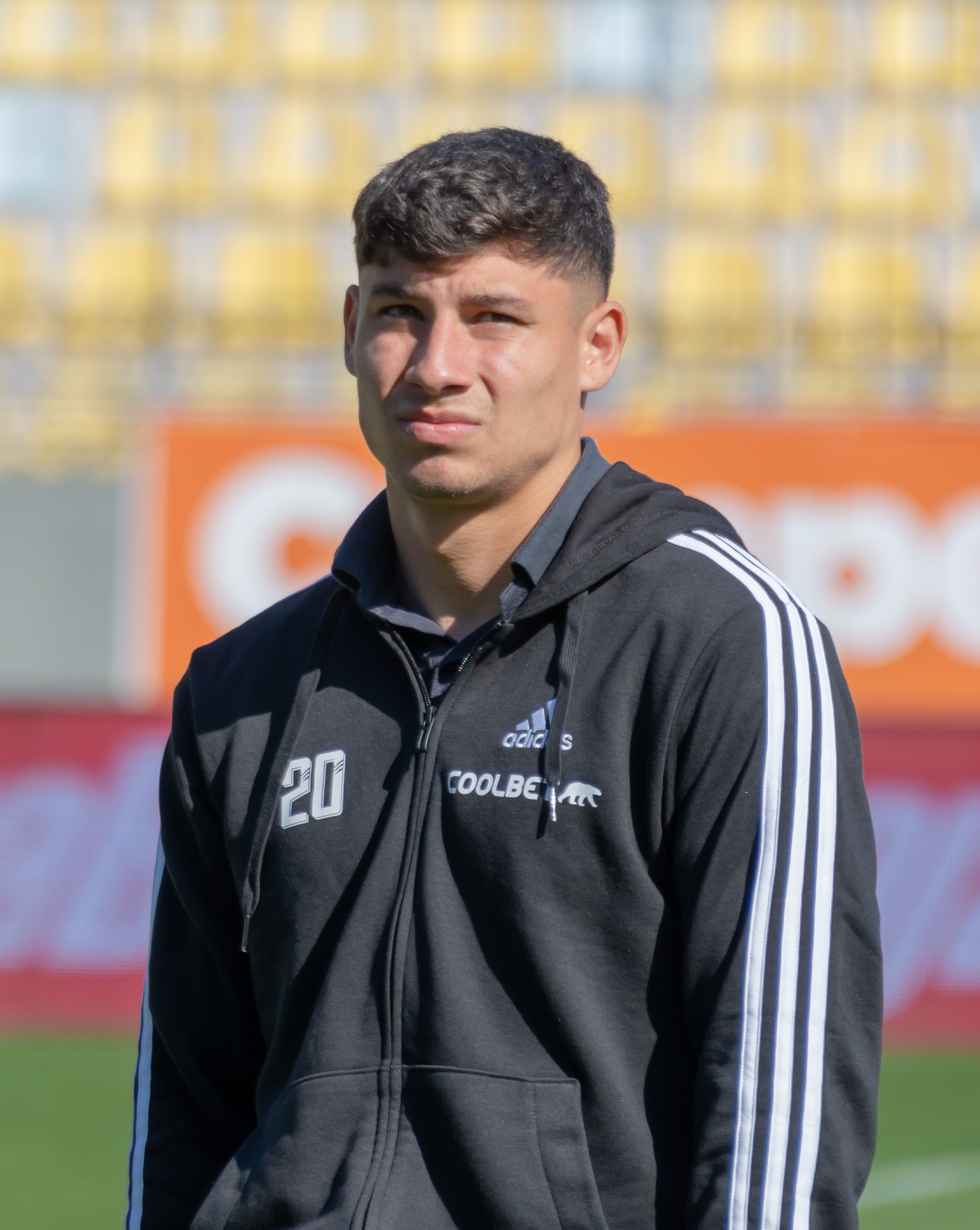
- Oroz with Colo-Colo in 2023

Personal information
- Full name: Alexander Antonio Oroz Huerta
- Date of birth: 15 December 2002 (age 23)
- Place of birth: Santiago, Chile
- Height: 1.71 m (5 ft 7 in)
- Position: Forward

Team information
- Current team: Deportes La Serena

Youth career
- Colo-Colo

Senior career*
Years	Team	Apps	(Gls)
2021–2025	Colo-Colo	36	(7)
2021	→ Deportes Iquique (loan)	28	(5)
2026–	Deportes La Serena	0	(0)

International career^{‡}
2017	Chile U15		
2018–2019	Chile U17	10	(2)
- * Club domestic league appearances and goals as of 1 January 2026 ‡ National team caps and goals as of 1 August 2022

Alexander Antonio Oroz Huerta (born 15 December 2002) is a Chilean professional footballer who plays as a forward for Deportes La Serena.

== Club career ==
A product of Colo-Colo youth system, he was loaned to Deportes Iquique in the Primera B for the 2021 season, where he made his professional debut scoring a goal in the first matchday versus Coquimbo Unido on 4 April 2021. In total, he made 28 appearances and scored 5 goals for Deportes Iquique before returning Colo-Colo for the 2022 season. He made his debut playing for Colo-Colo scoring a goal in the match versus Everton on 6 February 2022. He left Colo-Colo at the end of 2025.

On 6 January 2026, Oroz joined Deportes La Serena.

== International career ==
In 2017, Oroz took part of Chile U15 squad with Cristian Leiva as the coach. At under-17 level, he represented Chile at both the 2019 South American Championship – Chile was the runner-up – and the 2019 FIFA World Cup. Previously, in October 2018 he took part in the Torneo Cuatro Naciones Sub-17 (2018 Four Nations Tournament) in Mexico, making 3 appearances and scoring a goal versus Mexico U17.

At senior level, he was called up to the FIFA matchdays in June 2022 as a "projectable player" in the preliminary squad.

== Personal life ==
Oroz is the nephew of the former Chile Olympic footballer Andrés Oroz. In addition, his father, Antonio, was with the Colo-Colo youth ranks and plays football at amateur level as a left midfielder.

He has been nicknamed La Flecha (The Arrow) by his coach in Chile U15, Cristian Leiva, because of his speed.

== Honours ==
Colo-Colo

- Supercopa de Chile: 2022
