= Vicente Pizarro =

Chilean footballer (born 2002)

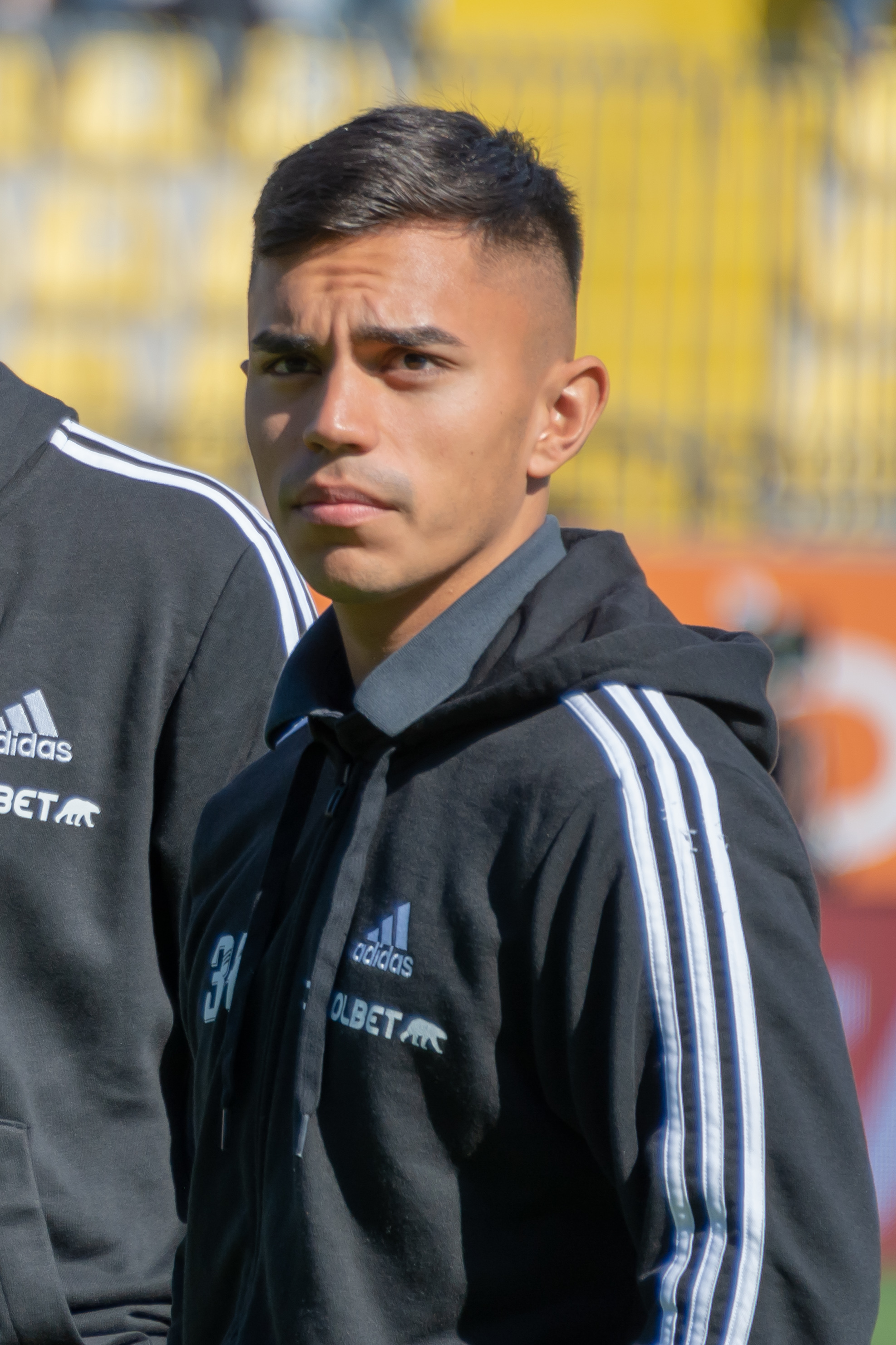
- Pizarro with Colo-Colo in 2023

Personal information
- Full name: Vicente Tomás Pizarro Durcudoy
- Date of birth: 5 November 2002 (age 24)
- Place of birth: Vitacura, Chile
- Height: 1.72 m (5 ft 8 in)
- Position: Midfielder

Team information
- Current team: Rosario Central
- Number: 20

Youth career
- Colo-Colo

Senior career*
Years	Team	Apps	(Gls)
2019–2026	Colo-Colo	120	(8)
2026–	Rosario Central	28	(1)

International career^{‡}
2017	Chile U15		
2018–2019	Chile U17	14	(0)
2020	Chile U20	3	(0)
2022–2024	Chile U23	10	(0)
2023–	Chile	20	(1)
Medal record
Men's football
Representing Chile
Pan American Games
Silver medal – second place	2023 Santiago	Team
- * Club domestic league appearances and goals as of 23:13, 20 September 2026 (UTC) ‡ National team caps and goals as of 6 October 2026

Vicente Tomás Pizarro Durcudoy (born 5 November 2002) is a Chilean professional footballer who plays as a midfielder for Argentine Primera División club Rosario Central and the Chile national team.

== Club career ==
Pizarro was team captain at all levels of the Colo-Colo youth team, also playing at the 2020 U-20 Copa Libertadores. He made his professional debut in a 2021 Chilean Primera División match against Ñublense on 2 May 2021.

On 8 January 2026, Pizarro signed with Argentine club Rosario Central.

== International career ==
Pizarro represented Chile U15 at the 2017 South American U-15 Championship and Chile U17 at the 2019 South American U-17 Championship – Chile was the runner-up – and at the 2019 FIFA U-17 World Cup. Also, he represented Chile U20 in a friendly tournament played in Teresópolis, Brazil, called Granja Comary International Tournament, playing all the matches against Peru U20, Bolivia U20, and Brazil U20.

He represented Chile at under-23 level in a 1–0 win against Peru U23 on 31 August 2022, in the context of preparations for the 2023 Pan American Games. He was included in the final squad for the games, where Chile won the silver medal.

In 2024, he took part in the Pre-Olympic Tournament.

At senior level, he received his first call up for the friendlies against Mexico and El Salvador in December 2021 and made his debut in the 2026 FIFA World Cup qualifier against Ecuador on 21 November 2023 by replacing Rodrigo Echeverría at the minute 79.

== Personal life ==
Pizarro is the youngest child of the Chilean former international footballer Jaime Pizarro.

== Career statistics ==
=== International ===
As of match played 6 October 2026

Appearances and goals by national team and year
National team	Year	Apps	Goals
Chile	2023	1	0
Chile	2024	3	0
Chile	2025	9	0
Chile	2026	7	1
Total		20	1

Scores and results list Chile's goal tally first, score column indicates score after each Pizarro goal.

List of international goals scored by Vicente Pizarro
No.	Date	Venue	Opponent	Score	Result	Competition
1	6 October 2026	Los Angeles Memorial Coliseum, Los Angeles, United States	Mexico	2–0	2–0	Friendly

== Honours ==
Colo-Colo

- Chilean Primera División: 2022
- Copa Chile: 2019, 2021
- Supercopa de Chile: 2022

Chile U23

- Pan American Games Silver Medal: 2023
