= 2019 South American U-17 Championship squads =

The 2019 South American U-17 Championship was an international football tournament held in Peru from 21 March to 14 April 2019. The ten national teams involved in the tournament were required to register a squad of 23 players; only players in these squads were eligible to take part in the tournament.

All registered players had to have been born on or after 1 January 2002. The age listed for each player is on 21 March 2019, the first day of the tournament.

CONMEBOL published the lists of the ten teams on 6 March 2019.

== Group A ==
=== Peru ===
Peru announced their squad of 23 players on 6 March 2019.

Head coach: Carlos Silvestri

| No. | Pos. | Player | Date of birth (age) | Club |
|---|---|---|---|---|
| 1 | GK | Diego Enríquez | 24 January 2002 (aged 17) | (Peruvian Football Federation) Sporting Cristal |
| 2 | DF | Jesús Reyes | 11 January 2002 (aged 17) | (Peruvian Football Federation) Sporting Cristal |
| 3 | DF | José Arón Sánchez | 4 May 2003 (aged 15) | (Peruvian Football Federation) Academia Cantolao |
| 4 | DF | José Soto | 21 March 2002 (aged 17) | (Peruvian Football Federation) Universitario |
| 5 | DF | José Racchumick | 1 January 2002 (aged 17) | (Peruvian Football Federation) Sporting Cristal |
| 6 | MF | Rafael Caipo | 6 February 2002 (aged 17) | (Peruvian Football Federation) Sporting Cristal |
| 7 | MF | Yuriel Celi | 20 February 2002 (aged 17) | (Peruvian Football Federation) Academia Cantolao |
| 8 | MF | Pedro de la Cruz | 15 January 2002 (aged 17) | (Peruvian Football Federation) Alianza Lima |
| 9 | FW | Joao Grimaldo | 20 February 2003 (aged 16) | (Peruvian Football Federation) Sporting Cristal |
| 10 | FW | Carlos Ruíz | 25 January 2002 (aged 17) | (Peruvian Football Federation) Sporting Cristal |
| 11 | FW | Didier La Torre | 21 March 2002 (aged 17) | (Peruvian Football Federation) Alianza Lima |
| 12 | GK | Massimo Sandi | 12 May 2002 (aged 16) | (Peruvian Football Federation) Alianza Lima |
| 13 | DF | Mathias Llontop | 22 May 2002 (aged 16) | (Peruvian Football Federation) Universidad San Martín |
| 14 | FW | Sebastián Cavero | 20 June 2002 (aged 16) | (Peruvian Football Federation) Alianza Lima |
| 15 | MF | Alessandro Burlamaqui | 18 February 2002 (aged 17) | (Royal Spanish Football Federation) Espanyol |
| 16 | MF | Jeremy Escate | 4 March 2002 (aged 17) | (Peruvian Football Federation) Alianza Lima |
| 17 | FW | Nicolás Figueroa | 24 May 2002 (aged 16) | (Peruvian Football Federation) Universidad San Martín |
| 18 | FW | Óscar Manuel Pinto | 20 January 2002 (aged 17) | (Peruvian Football Federation) Universidad San Martín |
| 19 | DF | Joao Montoya | 4 May 2002 (aged 16) | (Peruvian Football Federation) Academia Cantolao |
| 20 | MF | José Huayhua | 24 March 2002 (aged 16) | (Peruvian Football Federation) Universitario |
| 21 | GK | Ángel De la Cruz | 24 May 2002 (aged 16) | (Peruvian Football Federation) Alianza Lima |
| 22 | DF | Kluivert Aguilar | 5 May 2003 (aged 15) | (Peruvian Football Federation) Sporting Cristal |
| 23 | MF | Carlos Meza | 31 January 2002 (aged 17) | (Peruvian Football Federation) Sporting Cristal |

=== Ecuador ===
Head coach: Javier Rodríguez

The 23-man squad was announced on 7 March 2019.

| No. | Pos. | Player | Date of birth (age) | Club |
|---|---|---|---|---|
| 1 | GK | Joan López | 11 January 2002 (aged 17) | (Ecuadorian Football Federation) Independiente del Valle |
| 2 | DF | Jordan Morán | 17 March 2002 (aged 17) | (Ecuadorian Football Federation) LDU Quito |
| 3 | DF | Piero Hincapié | 9 January 2002 (aged 17) | (Ecuadorian Football Federation) Independiente del Valle |
| 4 | DF | Víctor Carabali | 27 January 2002 (aged 17) | (Ecuadorian Football Federation) Barcelona |
| 5 | MF | Marco Angulo | 8 May 2002 (aged 16) | (Ecuadorian Football Federation) Independiente del Valle |
| 6 | DF | Roberto Cabezas | 7 October 2002 (aged 16) | (Ecuadorian Football Federation) Independiente del Valle |
| 7 | MF | Jeremy Farfán | 26 January 2002 (aged 17) | (Ecuadorian Football Federation) LDU Portoviejo |
| 8 | MF | Neicer Acosta | 12 December 2002 (aged 16) | (Ecuadorian Football Federation) Independiente del Valle |
| 9 | FW | Edwin Valencia | 23 October 2002 (aged 16) | (Ecuadorian Football Federation) Barcelona |
| 10 | FW | Johan Mina | 15 May 2002 (aged 16) | (Ecuadorian Football Federation) Emelec |
| 11 | FW | Adrián Mejía | 28 May 2002 (aged 16) | (Ecuadorian Football Federation) Independiente del Valle |
| 12 | GK | Elías Valencia | 10 September 2002 (aged 16) | (Ecuadorian Football Federation) Universidad Católica |
| 13 | DF | Raúl Guerrón | 13 April 2003 (aged 15) | (Ecuadorian Football Federation) El Nacional |
| 14 | MF | Erick Plúas | 20 March 2002 (aged 17) | (Ecuadorian Football Federation) Orense |
| 15 | MF | Patrickson Delgado | 17 October 2003 (aged 15) | (Ecuadorian Football Federation) Independiente del Valle |
| 16 | MF | Isaac Padilla | 24 March 2002 (aged 16) | (Ecuadorian Football Federation) Delfín |
| 17 | MF | John Mercado | 3 June 2002 (aged 16) | (Ecuadorian Football Federation) Panamá |
| 18 | DF | Edwin Rodríguez | 8 January 2002 (aged 17) | (Ecuadorian Football Federation) Aucas |
| 19 | FW | Pedro Vite | 9 March 2002 (aged 17) | (Ecuadorian Football Federation) Independiente del Valle |
| 20 | DF | Hanssel Delgado | 7 April 2002 (aged 16) | (Ecuadorian Football Federation) Independiente del Valle |
| 21 | DF | Derihan Rivera | 11 August 2002 (aged 16) | (Ecuadorian Football Federation) LDU Portoviejo |
| 22 | GK | Gilmar Napa | 5 January 2003 (aged 16) | (Ecuadorian Football Federation) Orense |
| 23 | DF | Jaymar Reascos | 14 August 2003 (aged 15) | (Ecuadorian Football Federation) Emelec |

=== Bolivia ===
Head coach: (Ecuador) Sixto Vizuete

The 23-man squad was announced on 13 March 2019.

| No. | Pos. | Player | Date of birth (age) | Club |
|---|---|---|---|---|
| 1 | GK | Jorge Mejía | 24 March 2002 (aged 16) | (Bolivian Football Federation) Florida |
| 2 | DF | Cristian Hurtado | 10 December 2002 (aged 16) | (Bolivian Football Federation) Florida |
| 3 | DF | Mauricio Álvarez | 9 April 2003 (aged 15) | (Bolivian Football Federation) Florida |
| 4 | DF | Leonardo Zabala | 23 May 2002 (aged 16) | (Bolivian Football Federation) Calleja |
| 5 | MF | Víctor Hugo Lema | 22 June 2002 (aged 16) | (Bolivian Football Federation) Florida |
| 6 | DF | Manrique Espinosa | 17 August 2002 (aged 16) | (Bolivian Football Federation) Destroyers |
| 7 | MF | Miguel Villarroel | 10 January 2003 (aged 16) | (Bolivian Football Federation) Florida |
| 8 | FW | Luis Andrés Zeballos | 7 May 2002 (aged 16) | (Bolivian Football Federation) Academia Tahuichi Aguilera |
| 9 | MF | Jeyson Chura | 3 February 2002 (aged 17) | (Bolivian Football Federation) Florida |
| 10 | MF | Robson Matheus | 18 May 2002 (aged 16) | (Brazilian Football Confederation) Palmeiras |
| 11 | FW | José Alfredo Flores | 3 August 2003 (aged 15) | (Bolivian Football Federation) Academia Tahuichi Aguilera |
| 12 | GK | Bruno Hurtado | 8 November 2002 (aged 16) | (Bolivian Football Federation) Florida |
| 13 | DF | Daniel Lino | 18 February 2002 (aged 17) | (Bolivian Football Federation) Blooming |
| 14 | MF | Adrián Peña | 10 December 2003 (aged 15) | (Bolivian Football Federation) JMP Soccer |
| 15 | MF | Dalton Pallimo | 4 November 2002 (aged 16) | (Bolivian Football Federation) Independiente Yacuiba |
| 16 | FW | Matías Romero | 19 February 2002 (aged 17) | (Bolivian Football Federation) The Strongest |
| 17 | DF | Luis Ángel Flores | 19 September 2002 (aged 16) | (Bolivian Football Federation) Torre Fuerte |
| 18 | FW | Pablo Vaca | 31 May 2002 (aged 16) | (Bolivian Football Federation) Florida |
| 19 | FW | José Miguel Briceño | 20 January 2002 (aged 17) | (Bolivian Football Federation) Planeta |
| 20 | DF | Carlos Abastoflor | 9 April 2002 (aged 16) | (Bolivian Football Federation) Academia Tahuichi Aguilera |
| 21 | MF | Javier Uzeda | 31 July 2002 (aged 16) | (Bolivian Football Federation) Florida |
| 22 | GK | Edilson Vásquez | 24 October 2002 (aged 16) | (Bolivian Football Federation) Real Trópico |
| 23 | MF | Reynaldo Cuba | 11 August 2002 (aged 16) | (Bolivian Football Federation) The Strongest |

=== Venezuela ===
Head coach: José Baudilio Hernández

The 23-man squad was announced on 1 March 2019.

| No. | Pos. | Player | Date of birth (age) | Club |
|---|---|---|---|---|
| 1 | GK | Rodrigo de la Terga | 4 February 2002 (aged 17) | (Venezuelan Football Federation) Deportivo La Guaira |
| 2 | DF | Carlos Vivas | 4 April 2002 (aged 16) | (Venezuelan Football Federation) Deportivo Táchira |
| 3 | DF | Joaquín Suárez | 4 July 2002 (aged 16) | (Venezuelan Football Federation) Academia Puerto Cabello |
| 4 | DF | Óscar Conde | 6 June 2002 (aged 16) | (Venezuelan Football Federation) Academia Puerto Cabello |
| 5 | MF | Clyde García | 19 March 2002 (aged 17) | (Venezuelan Football Federation) Deportivo La Guaira |
| 6 | DF | Óscar Jiménez | 11 September 2002 (aged 16) | (Venezuelan Football Federation) Deportivo La Guaira |
| 7 | MF | Darluis Paz | 26 March 2002 (aged 16) | (Venezuelan Football Federation) Deportivo La Guaira |
| 8 | MF | Alfredo Urdaneta | 26 February 2002 (aged 17) | (Venezuelan Football Federation) Deportivo La Guaira |
| 9 | FW | Daniel Pérez | 17 January 2002 (aged 17) | (Venezuelan Football Federation) Metropolitanos |
| 10 | MF | Wikelman Carmona | 24 February 2003 (aged 16) | (Venezuelan Football Federation) Dynamo Margarita |
| 11 | MF | Matías Lacava | 24 October 2002 (aged 16) | (Portuguese Football Federation) Benfica |
| 12 | GK | Jesús Vega | 7 August 2002 (aged 16) | (Venezuelan Football Federation) Caracas |
| 13 | DF | Xavier Flores | 15 May 2002 (aged 16) | (Venezuelan Football Federation) Aragua |
| 14 | MF | Wilken Ramírez | 28 May 2002 (aged 16) | (Venezuelan Football Federation) Academia Puerto Cabello |
| 15 | MF | Carlos Faya | 18 January 2002 (aged 17) | (Venezuelan Football Federation) Academia Puerto Cabello |
| 16 | DF | Jon Aramburu | 23 July 2002 (aged 16) | (Venezuelan Football Federation) Deportivo La Guaira |
| 17 | DF | Leonel Toro | 30 January 2002 (aged 17) | (Venezuelan Football Federation) Caracas |
| 18 | MF | Luis Ángel Peña | 7 March 2002 (aged 17) | (Venezuelan Football Federation) Zamora |
| 19 | FW | Oswaldo Ruggeri | 28 January 2002 (aged 17) | (Venezuelan Football Federation) Ureña |
| 20 | MF | Yorlen Cordero | 5 February 2002 (aged 17) | (Venezuelan Football Federation) Monagas |
| 21 | MF | Yackson Rivas | 18 March 2002 (aged 17) | (Venezuelan Football Federation) Mineros de Guayana |
| 22 | GK | Luis Balbo | 5 May 2003 (aged 15) | (Portuguese Football Federation) Porto |
| 23 | FW | Jeriel De Santis | 18 June 2002 (aged 16) | (Venezuelan Football Federation) Caracas |

=== Chile ===
Head coach: (Argentina) Hernán Caputto

The 23-man squad was announced on 7 March 2019.

| No. | Pos. | Player | Date of birth (age) | Club |
|---|---|---|---|---|
| 1 | GK | Julio Fierro | 9 April 2002 (aged 16) | (Football Federation of Chile) Colo-Colo |
| 2 | DF | David Tati | 6 June 2002 (aged 16) | (Football Federation of Chile) Colo-Colo |
| 3 | DF | Patricio Flores | 30 January 2002 (aged 17) | (Football Federation of Chile) Universidad Católica |
| 4 | DF | Cristian Riquelme | 14 October 2003 (aged 15) | (Football Federation of Chile) Everton |
| 5 | DF | Daniel González | 20 February 2002 (aged 17) | (Football Federation of Chile) Santiago Wanderers |
| 6 | MF | Danilo Díaz | 24 June 2002 (aged 16) | (Football Federation of Chile) Colo-Colo |
| 7 | FW | Gonzalo Tapia | 18 February 2002 (aged 17) | (Football Federation of Chile) Universidad Católica |
| 8 | MF | Vicente Pizarro | 5 November 2002 (aged 16) | (Football Federation of Chile) Colo-Colo |
| 9 | FW | César Díaz | 31 January 2002 (aged 17) | (Football Federation of Chile) Unión Española |
| 10 | FW | Alexander Aravena | 6 September 2002 (aged 16) | (Football Federation of Chile) Universidad Católica |
| 11 | FW | Kennan Sepúlveda | 8 February 2002 (aged 17) | (Football Federation of Chile) Santiago Wanderers |
| 12 | GK | Vicente Reyes | 19 November 2003 (aged 15) | (United States Soccer Federation) Atlanta United |
| 13 | DF | Daniel Gutiérrez | 16 February 2003 (aged 16) | (Football Federation of Chile) Colo-Colo |
| 14 | MF | César Pérez | 29 November 2002 (aged 16) | (Football Federation of Chile) Magallanes |
| 15 | MF | Christopher Saldías | 11 April 2003 (aged 15) | (Football Federation of Chile) O'Higgins |
| 16 | DF | Nicolás Garrido | 27 August 2002 (aged 16) | (Football Federation of Chile) Colo-Colo |
| 17 | DF | Joaquín Gutiérrez | 4 July 2002 (aged 16) | (Football Federation of Chile) Huachipato |
| 18 | MF | Bastián Ubal | 29 January 2002 (aged 17) | (Football Federation of Chile) Universidad de Chile |
| 19 | FW | Alexander Oroz | 15 December 2002 (aged 16) | (Football Federation of Chile) Colo-Colo |
| 20 | MF | Luis Rojas | 6 March 2002 (aged 17) | (Football Federation of Chile) Universidad de Chile |
| 21 | FW | Benjamín Osses | 24 June 2002 (aged 16) | (Football Federation of Chile) Cobresal |
| 22 | FW | Matías Belmar | 26 August 2002 (aged 16) | (Football Federation of Chile) O'Higgins |
| 23 | GK | Diego Carreño | 26 April 2002 (aged 16) | (Football Federation of Chile) O'Higgins |

== Group B ==
=== Brazil ===
Head coach: Guilherme Dalla Déa

The 23-man squad was announced on 1 March 2019.

| No. | Pos. | Player | Date of birth (age) | Club |
|---|---|---|---|---|
| 1 | GK | Gabriel Pereira | 2 July 2002 (aged 16) | (Brazilian Football Confederation) Grêmio |
| 2 | DF | Yan Couto | 3 June 2002 (aged 16) | (Brazilian Football Confederation) Coritiba |
| 3 | DF | Henri | 19 February 2002 (aged 17) | (Brazilian Football Confederation) Palmeiras |
| 4 | DF | Renan | 19 May 2002 (aged 16) | (Brazilian Football Confederation) Palmeiras |
| 5 | MF | Daniel Cabral | 14 May 2002 (aged 16) | (Brazilian Football Confederation) Flamengo |
| 6 | DF | Patryck Lanza | 18 January 2003 (aged 16) | (Brazilian Football Confederation) São Paulo |
| 7 | FW | Gabriel Veron | 3 September 2002 (aged 16) | (Brazilian Football Confederation) Palmeiras |
| 8 | MF | Diego Rosa | 12 October 2002 (aged 16) | (Brazilian Football Confederation) Grêmio |
| 9 | FW | João Peglow | 7 January 2002 (aged 17) | (Brazilian Football Confederation) Internacional |
| 10 | MF | Reinier | 19 January 2002 (aged 17) | (Brazilian Football Confederation) Flamengo |
| 11 | FW | Gabriel Silva | 22 March 2002 (aged 16) | (Brazilian Football Confederation) Palmeiras |
| 12 | GK | Marcelo Pitaluga | 20 December 2002 (aged 16) | (Brazilian Football Confederation) Fluminense |
| 13 | DF | Gustavo Garcia | 4 January 2002 (aged 17) | (Brazilian Football Confederation) Palmeiras |
| 14 | DF | Gabriel Noga | 25 January 2002 (aged 17) | (Brazilian Football Confederation) Flamengo |
| 15 | DF | Daniel Alves | 4 January 2002 (aged 17) | (Brazilian Football Confederation) Palmeiras |
| 16 | DF | Kawan | 6 March 2002 (aged 17) | (Brazilian Football Confederation) Atlético Paranaense |
| 17 | MF | Fabinho | 9 April 2002 (aged 16) | (Brazilian Football Confederation) Palmeiras |
| 18 | FW | Guilherme Cachoeira | 25 April 2002 (aged 16) | (Brazilian Football Confederation) São Paulo |
| 19 | FW | Juan | 7 March 2002 (aged 17) | (Brazilian Football Confederation) São Paulo |
| 20 | MF | Neto | 11 September 2002 (aged 16) | (Brazilian Football Confederation) Atlético Mineiro |
| 21 | FW | Marquinhos | 7 April 2003 (aged 15) | (Brazilian Football Confederation) São Paulo |
| 22 | GK | Cristian | 25 February 2002 (aged 17) | (Brazilian Football Confederation) Atlético Mineiro |
| 23 | FW | Miguel Silveira | 26 March 2003 (aged 15) | (Brazilian Football Confederation) Fluminense |

=== Argentina ===
Head coach: Pablo Aimar

The 23-man squad was announced on 2 March 2019.

| No. | Pos. | Player | Date of birth (age) | Club |
|---|---|---|---|---|
| 1 | GK | Rocco Ríos Novo | 4 June 2002 (aged 16) | (Argentine Football Association) Lanús |
| 2 | DF | Francisco Flores | 11 January 2002 (aged 17) | (Argentine Football Association) San Lorenzo |
| 3 | DF | Bruno Amione | 3 January 2002 (aged 17) | (Argentine Football Association) Belgrano |
| 4 | DF | Kevin Lomónaco | 8 January 2002 (aged 17) | (Argentine Football Association) Lanús |
| 5 | MF | David Ayala | 26 July 2002 (aged 16) | (Argentine Football Association) Estudiantes de La Plata |
| 6 | DF | Julián Aude | 24 March 2003 (aged 15) | (Argentine Football Association) Lanús |
| 7 | FW | Exequiel Zeballos | 24 April 2002 (aged 16) | (Argentine Football Association) Boca Juniors |
| 8 | MF | Juan Sforza | 14 February 2002 (aged 17) | (Argentine Football Association) Newell's Old Boys |
| 9 | FW | Matías Godoy | 10 January 2002 (aged 17) | (Argentine Football Association) Atlético de Rafaela |
| 10 | MF | Matías Palacios | 10 May 2002 (aged 16) | (Argentine Football Association) San Lorenzo |
| 11 | FW | Franco Orozco | 9 January 2002 (aged 17) | (Argentine Football Association) Lanús |
| 12 | GK | Federico Losas | 28 March 2002 (aged 16) | (Argentine Football Association) Chacarita Juniors |
| 13 | DF | Valentín Benítez | 26 March 2002 (aged 16) | (Argentine Football Association) Newell's Old Boys |
| 14 | DF | Tomás Lecanda | 29 January 2002 (aged 17) | (Argentine Football Association) River Plate |
| 15 | MF | Ignacio Fernández | 25 July 2002 (aged 16) | (Argentine Football Association) Boca Juniors |
| 16 | MF | Cristian Medina | 1 June 2002 (aged 16) | (Argentine Football Association) Boca Juniors |
| 17 | FW | Santiago Simón | 13 June 2002 (aged 16) | (Argentine Football Association) River Plate |
| 18 | FW | Juan Pablo Krilanovich | 7 April 2002 (aged 16) | (Argentine Football Association) Lanús |
| 19 | MF | Alan Velasco | 27 July 2002 (aged 16) | (Argentine Football Association) Independiente |
| 20 | MF | Luciano Ferreyra | 19 February 2002 (aged 17) | (Argentine Football Association) Rosario Central |
| 21 | DF | Luciano Vera | 9 February 2002 (aged 17) | (Argentine Football Association) River Plate |
| 22 | MF | Ricardo Martínez | 5 September 2002 (aged 16) | (Argentine Football Association) Boca Juniors |
| 23 | GK | Agustín Gómez | 16 January 2002 (aged 17) | (Argentine Football Association) River Plate |

=== Colombia ===
Head coach: Héctor Cárdenas

The 23-man squad was announced on 18 March 2019.

| No. | Pos. | Player | Date of birth (age) | Club |
|---|---|---|---|---|
| 1 | GK | Juan Diego Castillo | 13 January 2003 (aged 16) | (Colombian Football Federation) Carlos Sarmiento Lora |
| 2 | FW | Juan Madrid | 30 January 2002 (aged 17) | (Colombian Football Federation) Barranquilla |
| 3 | DF | Edilson Pérez | 20 January 2002 (aged 17) | (Colombian Football Federation) Atlético Nacional |
| 4 | MF | Yoni Mosquera | 23 March 2002 (aged 16) | (Colombian Football Federation) Estudiantil |
| 5 | DF | Germán Meneses | 28 February 2002 (aged 17) | (Colombian Football Federation) Estudiantil |
| 6 | FW | Yani Quintero | 17 July 2002 (aged 16) | (Colombian Football Federation) Universitario Popayán |
| 7 | FW | Yéferson Paz | 13 June 2002 (aged 16) | (Colombian Football Federation) Cortuluá |
| 8 | DF | José Luis Caicedo | 23 May 2002 (aged 16) | (Colombian Football Federation) Independiente Santa Fe |
| 9 | FW | Juan Diego Alegría | 6 June 2002 (aged 16) | (Colombian Football Federation) Deportes Tolima |
| 10 | FW | Dylan Borrero | 5 January 2002 (aged 17) | (Colombian Football Federation) Independiente Santa Fe |
| 11 | FW | Juan David Fuentes | 10 May 2003 (aged 15) | (Royal Spanish Football Federation) Barcelona |
| 12 | GK | Miguel Ángel Sánchez | 26 September 2002 (aged 16) | (Colombian Football Federation) Deportivo Cali |
| 13 | DF | Jhon Durán | 13 December 2003 (aged 15) | (Colombian Football Federation) Envigado |
| 14 | MF | Juan Perea | 19 May 2002 (aged 16) | (Royal Spanish Football Federation) Atlético Madrid |
| 15 | MF | Andrés Arroyo | 20 January 2002 (aged 17) | (Colombian Football Federation) Deportivo Cali |
| 16 | FW | Brayan Montaño | 2 May 2002 (aged 16) | (Colombian Football Federation) Deportivo Cali |
| 17 | FW | Juan Manuel Cuesta | 9 February 2002 (aged 17) | (Colombian Football Federation) Independiente Medellín |
| 18 | DF | Johan Hinestroza | 14 March 2002 (aged 17) | (Colombian Football Federation) Atlético Nacional |
| 19 | FW | Ferlys García | 23 February 2002 (aged 17) | (Colombian Football Federation) Barranquilla |
| 20 | MF | Jhon Granados | 2 April 2002 (aged 16) | (Colombian Football Federation) Real Academia |
| 21 | FW | Johan Campaña | 9 September 2002 (aged 16) | (Colombian Football Federation) Deportivo Pasto |
| 22 | GK | Juan José Uribe | 19 May 2002 (aged 16) | (Colombian Football Federation) Atlético Nacional |
| 23 | FW | Juan David Mosquera | 5 September 2002 (aged 16) | (Colombian Football Federation) Carlos Sarmiento Lora |

=== Uruguay ===
Head coach: Alejandro Garay

The 23-man squad was announced on 27 February 2019.

| No. | Pos. | Player | Date of birth (age) | Club |
|---|---|---|---|---|
| 1 | GK | Lukas González | 11 February 2002 (aged 17) | (Uruguayan Football Association) River Plate de Salto |
| 2 | DF | Enzo Siri | 9 March 2002 (aged 17) | (Uruguayan Football Association) Danubio |
| 3 | DF | Joaquín Sosa | 10 January 2002 (aged 17) | (Uruguayan Football Association) Nacional |
| 4 | DF | Pedro Milans | 24 March 2002 (aged 16) | (Uruguayan Football Association) Juventud |
| 5 | MF | Vicente Poggi | 11 July 2002 (aged 16) | (Uruguayan Football Association) Defensor Sporting |
| 6 | DF | Ignacio Velázquez | 31 October 2002 (aged 16) | (Uruguayan Football Association) Nacional |
| 7 | MF | Cristian Olivera | 17 April 2002 (aged 16) | (Uruguayan Football Association) Rentistas |
| 8 | MF | Santiago Cartagena | 1 September 2002 (aged 16) | (Uruguayan Football Association) Nacional |
| 9 | FW | Juan Manuel Gutiérrez | 4 February 2002 (aged 17) | (Uruguayan Football Association) Danubio |
| 10 | MF | Matías Ocampo | 14 March 2002 (aged 17) | (Uruguayan Football Association) Defensor Sporting |
| 11 | FW | Maximiliano Juambeltz | 9 June 2002 (aged 16) | (Uruguayan Football Association) Defensor Sporting |
| 12 | GK | Randall Rodríguez | 29 November 2003 (aged 15) | (Uruguayan Football Association) Peñarol |
| 13 | DF | Axel Prado | 17 November 2002 (aged 16) | (Uruguayan Football Association) Juventud |
| 14 | DF | Bruno Vera | 4 May 2003 (aged 15) | (Uruguayan Football Association) Ferro Carril de Salto |
| 15 | DF | Luciano Fernández | 16 March 2002 (aged 17) | (Uruguayan Football Association) Peñarol |
| 16 | MF | Alexander Machado | 28 May 2002 (aged 16) | (Uruguayan Football Association) Cerro |
| 17 | FW | Santiago Álvez | 13 July 2002 (aged 16) | (Uruguayan Football Association) Danubio |
| 18 | MF | Kevin Alaniz | 30 January 2003 (aged 16) | (Uruguayan Football Association) Fénix |
| 19 | FW | Matías Arezo | 21 November 2002 (aged 16) | (Uruguayan Football Association) River Plate |
| 20 | MF | Braulio Guisolfo | 7 May 2002 (aged 16) | (Uruguayan Football Association) Peñarol |
| 21 | FW | Axel Pérez | 18 February 2002 (aged 17) | (Uruguayan Football Association) Nacional |
| 22 | MF | Guillermo Wagner | 9 January 2002 (aged 17) | (Uruguayan Football Association) Montevideo Wanderers |
| 23 | GK | Ignacio Suárez | 5 February 2002 (aged 17) | (Uruguayan Football Association) Nacional |

=== Paraguay ===
Head coach: Gustavo Morínigo

The 23-man squad was announced on 23 February 2019.

| No. | Pos. | Player | Date of birth (age) | Club |
|---|---|---|---|---|
| 1 | GK | Antonio González | 2 January 2002 (aged 17) | (Paraguayan Football Association) Cerro Porteño |
| 2 | DF | Santiago Ocampos | 22 January 2002 (aged 17) | (Italian Football Federation) Juventus |
| 3 | DF | Rodrigo Melgarejo | 23 May 2002 (aged 16) | (Paraguayan Football Association) Deportivo Capiatá |
| 4 | DF | Gastón Benítez | 21 May 2002 (aged 16) | (Paraguayan Football Association) Nacional |
| 5 | DF | Rolando Ortiz | 19 August 2002 (aged 16) | (Paraguayan Football Association) Olimpia |
| 6 | MF | Wilder Viera | 4 March 2002 (aged 17) | (Paraguayan Football Association) Cerro Porteño |
| 7 | MF | Rodrigo López | 29 March 2002 (aged 16) | (Paraguayan Football Association) Libertad |
| 8 | MF | Fabrizio Peralta | 2 August 2002 (aged 16) | (Paraguayan Football Association) Cerro Porteño |
| 9 | FW | Diego Ariel Duarte | 8 April 2002 (aged 16) | (Paraguayan Football Association) Olimpia |
| 10 | MF | Fernando Ovelar | 6 January 2004 (aged 15) | (Paraguayan Football Association) Cerro Porteño |
| 11 | MF | Júnior Noguera | 8 May 2002 (aged 16) | (Paraguayan Football Association) Cerro Porteño |
| 12 | GK | Fernando Pineda | 8 April 2002 (aged 16) | (Paraguayan Football Association) Libertad |
| 13 | DF | Basilio Duarte | 1 November 2002 (aged 16) | (Paraguayan Football Association) Cerro Porteño |
| 14 | DF | Ulises González | 15 January 2002 (aged 17) | (Paraguayan Football Association) Deportivo Capiatá |
| 15 | MF | Denis Colmán | 22 March 2003 (aged 15) | (Paraguayan Football Association) Olimpia |
| 16 | MF | Matías Galarza | 11 February 2002 (aged 17) | (Paraguayan Football Association) Olimpia |
| 17 | MF | Roque Amarilla | 26 May 2002 (aged 16) | (Paraguayan Football Association) Cerro Porteño |
| 18 | FW | Diego Acosta | 12 November 2002 (aged 16) | (Paraguayan Football Association) Libertad |
| 19 | FW | Fernando Presentado | 28 June 2002 (aged 16) | (Paraguayan Football Association) Nacional |
| 20 | MF | Diego Fernández | 2 September 2002 (aged 16) | (Paraguayan Football Association) Sportivo Luqueño |
| 21 | MF | Orlando Colmán | 2 February 2002 (aged 17) | (Paraguayan Football Association) Nacional |
| 22 | DF | Fabio Barrios | 19 September 2002 (aged 16) | (Paraguayan Football Association) Olimpia |
| 23 | GK | Diego Aranda | 2 March 2002 (aged 17) | (Paraguayan Football Association) Sol de América |
