= Kawan =

Kawan may refer to:

- Batu Kawan, an island in Malaysia
- Kawan Bergeloet, a book in Indonesian
- Kawan Prather (born 1973), American record executive
- Kawan Pereira (born 2002), Brazilian diver
- Kawan Gabriel da Silva (born 2002), Brazilian footballer
- Kawan by Uncle Roger, a restaurant joint venture by Nigel Ng
- Lucas Kawan (born 2003), Brazilian footballer
