= Juan Carlos Alegría =

Chilean footballer (born 1975)

Personal information
- Full name: Juan Carlos Alegría Villamán
- Date of birth: 22 January 1975 (age 51)
- Place of birth: Santiago, Chile
- Height: 1.65 m (5 ft 5 in)
- Position: Midfielder

Youth career
- Colo-Colo

Senior career*
Years	Team	Apps	(Gls)
1993–1998	Colo-Colo	8	(0)
1998	Magallanes		
1999	Unión San Felipe	22	(0)
2000	Deportes Temuco		
2001–2002	Universidad de Concepción		(1)
2003	Magallanes		(1)
2004–2006	Deportivo Italmaracaibo	23	(2)
2004–2005	→ Deportivo Maracaibo (loan)		(5)
2006–2007	Mineros de Guayana	2	(0)

International career
1991	Chile U17		
1995	Chile U20		

Managerial career
- 2013–2015: Chile U15 (assistant)
- 2013–2015: Chile U17 (assistant)
- * Club domestic league appearances and goals

Juan Carlos Alegría Villamán (born 22 January 1975) is a Chilean former professional footballer who played as a midfielder for clubs in Chile and Venezuela.

== Club career ==
A product of Colo-Colo youth system, where he coincided with players such as Nicolás Córdova and Manuel Villalobos, he made his professional debut in a 1992 Copa Chile match against Magallanes, where he scored a goal at the minute 86, becoming the youngest player who has scored for the club at professional level.

In Chile he also played for Magallanes, in two stints, and Universidad de Concepción.

Abroad, he played for the Venezuelan clubs Deportivo Italmaracaibo, Deportivo Maracaibo and Mineros de Guayana. For Deportivo Maracaibo, he scored 5 goals.

As a curiosity, in 2006 he coincided in Italmaracaibo with the Argentine player Sergio Daniel López, who is a nephew of Diego Maradona.

== International career ==
Alegría represented Chile at under-17 level in the 1991 South American Championship and at under-20 level in the 1995 South American Championship.

== Coaching career ==
He graduated as a football manager and worked as the assistant of both Hernán Caputto in Chile U15 and Hugo Tocalli in Chile U17.

He is a member of the technical department of Colo-Colo.

== Personal life ==
He has a close friendship with the former footballer Frank Lobos.

== Honours ==
Colo-Colo

- Chilean Primera División: 1993, 1996, 1997 Clausura
- Copa Chile: 1994, 1996
