= Frank Lobos =

Chilean footballer (born 1976)

Personal information
- Full name: Frank Ronald Lobos Acuña
- Date of birth: September 25, 1976 (age 50)
- Place of birth: Santiago, Chile
- Height: 1.61 m (5 ft 3 in)
- Position: Midfielder

Youth career
- Colo-Colo

Senior career*
Years	Team	Apps	(Gls)
1992–1999	Colo-Colo	40	(1)
1999	Deportes La Serena	36	(3)
2000	Everton	14	(4)
2001	Deportes Concepción	7	(0)
2001–2002	Racing de Ferrol	19	(0)
2003	Mito HollyHock	16	(1)
2005	Deportes Puerto Montt	28	(5)
2006	Vasco da Gama	0	(0)
Total		144	(13)

International career
1993	Chile U17		
1995	Chile U20		
- * Club domestic league appearances and goals

Frank Ronald Lobos Acuña (born September 25, 1976) is a Chilean former professional footballer who played as a midfielder. His greatest achievement was reaching the third place at the 1993 U-17 World Cup. There he was one of the main figures of the Chilean team, along with Manuel Neira, Héctor Tapia, Sebastián Rozental, Dante Poli, Ariel Salas, Patricio Galaz, and Alejandro Osorio.

== International career ==
He played for Chile in both the 1993 FIFA U17 World Championship in Japan, where Chile reached the third place, and the 1995 FIFA U20 Championship in Qatar. In addition, he took part of Chile squad in both the 1993 South American U17 Championship and the 1995 South American U20 Championship.

== Personal life ==
Due to the fame, Lobos and his fellow players acquired after the 1993 U17 World Championship, he performed as a member of jury of the 1994 Viña del Mar International Song Festival and also acted in the TV series Rompecorazón. In addition, he took part in the reality show Año cero (Year Zero) in 2011.

Since 2015, he has performed as a football coach and motivational teller in the penitentiaries, organizing football games and other activities financed by the Ministry of Justice.

Lobos has a close friendship with the former footballer Juan Carlos Alegría.

In 2016, Lobos was a candidate to councillor for Puente Alto commune supported by the Radical Party of Chile.

In the 2024 Chilean municipal elections, Lobos was elected councillor for Cerro Navia commune supported by National Renewal.

=== Controversies ===
He was punished by the Disciplinary Court of the ANFP with 10 years of total disability in everything that relates to professional football after being found guilty of bribery.

== Honours ==
Colo-Colo

- Chilean Primera División: 1996, 1997 Clausura, 1998
- Copa Chile: 1994, 1996

Chile U17

- FIFA U-17 World Cup third place: 1993
