= Silvio Rojas =

Silvio Rojas may refer to:

- Silvio Rojas (Bolivian footballer) (born 1959)
- Silvio Rojas (Chilean footballer) (born 1977)
