= Jesús Reyes =

Jesús Reyes may refer to:

- Jesús Reyes (baseball), Dominican baseball player
- Jesús Reyes Espinoza, Peruvian footballer
- Jesús Reyes Guadalupe (1982–2017), Peruvian footballer
- Jesús Reyes Ferreira (1880–1977), Mexican artist and antiques and art collector
- Jesús Reyes González ("Máscara Año 2000"), Mexican wrestler
- Jesús Reyes Heroles (1921–1985), Mexican politician and jurist
- Jesús Federico Reyes Heroles (1952–2024), Mexican economist and politician
