= Julio Fierro =

Julio Fierro may refer to:

- Julio Ricardo Fierro, Mexican archer
- Julio Fierro (footballer), Chilean footballer
