= José Soto =

José Soto may refer to:

- José Soto (footballer, born 1970), Peruvian football manager and player
- José Soto (footballer, born 2002), Peruvian footballer
- José Soto (Chilean footballer) (born 1986), Chilean footballer
- Chemo Soto (José Ramón Soto), mayor of Canóvanas, Puerto Rico
- José Luis Soto (1932–2006), Costa Rican footballer
- José Manuel Soto (born 1946), Costa Rican cyclist
- José Tous Soto (1874–1933), Puerto Rican politician
- José Soto Martínez (born 1946), Mexican politician
