= Luis Rojas (footballer, born 2002) =

Chilean footballer

Personal information
- Full name: Luis José Esteban Rojas Zamora
- Date of birth: 6 March 2002 (age 24)
- Place of birth: San Bernardo, Santiago, Chile
- Height: 1.80 m (5 ft 11 in)
- Position: Midfielder

Team information
- Current team: Universidad de Concepción
- Number: 22

Youth career
- 2010-2014: Colo-Colo
- 2014-2018: Universidad de Chile

Senior career*
Years	Team	Apps	(Gls)
2019–2020	Universidad de Chile	3	(0)
2020–2025	Crotone	24	(0)
2022	→ Bologna (loan)	0	(0)
2023	→ Pro Vercelli (loan)	13	(1)
2024	→ Pro Vercelli (loan)	16	(2)
2025	→ Trenčín (loan)	1	(0)
2025–	Universidad de Concepción	15	(5)

International career^{‡}
2019	Chile U17	11	(5)
- * Club domestic league appearances and goals as of 5 February 2026 ‡ National team caps and goals as of 11 October 2021

Luis José Esteban Rojas Zamora (born 6 March 2002), known simply as Luis Rojas, is a Chilean footballer who plays as a midfielder for Universidad de Concepción.

== Club career ==
In September 2020, Rojas joined Crotone in Italy.

On 31 January 2022, Rojas was loaned to Bologna in Serie A until the end of the 2021–22 season.

On 31 January 2023, Rojas was loaned to Pro Vercelli in Serie C. Exactly one year later, Rojas returned to Pro Vercelli on a new loan.

In January 2025, Rojas moved to Slovakia and joined AS Trenčín on a one-year loan with an option to buy. The loan ended on 2 May of the same year.

Back to Chile, Rojas joined Universidad de Concepción on 7 July 2025, winning the 2025 Liga de Ascenso.

== Career statistics ==
=== Club ===
As of 5 March 2020.

Club	Season	League			Cup		Continental		Other		Total	
Club	Season	Division	Apps	Goals	Apps	Goals	Apps	Goals	Apps	Goals	Apps	Goals
Universidad de Chile	2019	Chilean Primera División	0	0	2 (Note: Appearances in the Copa Chile)	0	0	0	0	0	2	0
Universidad de Chile	2020	Chilean Primera División	3	0	0	0	0	0	0	0	3	0
Career total			3	0	2	0	0	0	0	0	5	0

== Personal life ==
He is the son of the Chilean former international footballer Luis Rojas Álvarez and brother of Silvio Rojas, a former footballer who represented Chile U17 at the 1993 FIFA World Championship.

== Honours ==
Universidad de Concepción

- Primera B de Chile: 2025
