= Yerko Leiva =

Chilean footballer (born 1998)

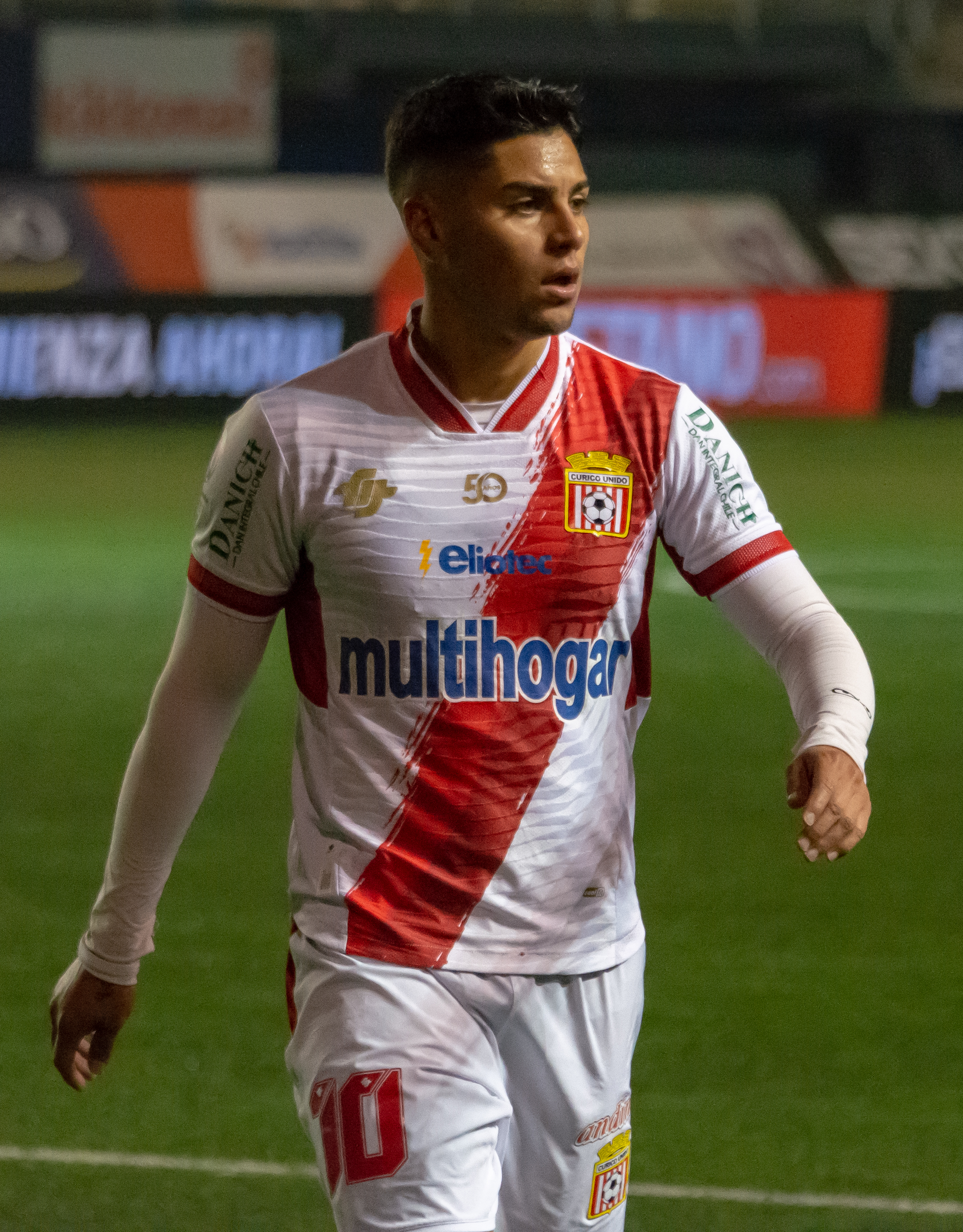
- Leiva with Curicó Unido in 2023.

Personal information
- Full name: Yerko Bastián Leiva Lazo
- Date of birth: June 14, 1998 (age 28)
- Place of birth: Santiago, Chile
- Height: 1.62 m (5 ft 4 in)
- Position: Midfielder

Team information
- Current team: Unión La Calera

Youth career
- Universidad de Chile

Senior career*
Years	Team	Apps	(Gls)
2016–2019	Universidad de Chile	34	(3)
2019	Unión La Calera	7	(0)
2020–2022	Necaxa	12	(0)
2021–2022	→ Curicó Unido (loan)	54	(7)
2023–2025	Curicó Unido	50	(3)
2024	→ O'Higgins (loan)	18	(1)
2026–	Unión La Calera	0	(0)

International career^{‡}
2014–2015	Chile U17	7	(1)
2017	Chile U20	4	(0)
2017–	Chile	1	(0)
- * Club domestic league appearances and goals as of 31 December 2025 ‡ National team caps and goals as of 2 June 2017

Yerko Bastián Leiva Lazo (born 14 June 1998) is a Chilean professional footballer who plays as a midfielder for Unión La Calera.

== Career ==
In 2024, Leiva joined O'Higgins on loan from Curicó Unido.

On 30 December 2025, Leiva returned to Unión La Calera after his stint in 2019.

== International career ==
Leiva represented Chile U17 at the 2014 South American Games.

== Personal life ==
He is the older brother of the footballer Sergio Leiva.

== Career statistics ==
=== Club ===
Club	Season	League		Continental		Cup		Other		Total	
Club	Season	Apps	Goals	Apps	Goals	Apps	Goals	Apps	Goals	Apps	Goals
Universidad de Chile	2015–16	7	1	0	0	0	0	0	0	7	1
Universidad de Chile	2016–17	6	1	0	0	1	0	1	0	8	1
Universidad de Chile	2017	8	0	0	0	7	1	0	0	15	1
Universidad de Chile	2018	11	1	3	0	7	2	1	0	22	3
Universidad de Chile	Total	32	3	3	0	15	3	2	0	52	6
Career total		32	3	3	0	15	3	2	0	52	6
