= Mauricio Morales =

Chilean footballer (born 2000)

Personal information
- Full name: Mauricio Geraldiny Morales Olivares
- Date of birth: 7 January 2000 (age 26)
- Place of birth: Pichidangui, Los Vilos, Chile
- Height: 1.69 m (5 ft 7 in)
- Position: Central midfielder

Youth career
- 2013–2019: Universidad de Chile

Senior career*
Years	Team	Apps	(Gls)
2019–2025	Universidad de Chile	24	(1)
2023	→ Deportes Antofagasta (loan)	9	(0)
2024	→ Unión La Calera (loan)	4	(0)
2025	→ Magallanes (loan)	19	(0)

International career
2015	Chile U15		
2017	Chile U17	16	(0)
- * Club domestic league appearances and goals as of 24 December 2025

Mauricio Geraldiny Morales Olivares (born 7 January 2000), also known as Mauro Morales, is a Chilean professional footballer who plays as a central midfielder.

== Club career ==
Morales made his professional debut in a Copa Chile match against Cobresal on 7 September 2019. On 21 December, he signed his first contract as a professional footballer. Morales made his international club debut in a Copa Libertadores match against San Lorenzo de Almagro on 18 March 2021. In July 2023, Morales joined on loan to Deportes Antofagasta in the Primera B de Chile. The next two years, he was loaned out to Unión La Calera and Magallanes. He ended his contract with Universidad de Chile in December 2025.

In January 2026, Morales trialed with New Zealand club Auckland City.

== International career ==
At early age, he represented Chile at under-15 level at the 2015 South American U-15 Championship and winning the friendly 2015 Aspire Tri-Series International Tournament in Doha, Qatar. Later, he represented the under-17 team in two friendly matches against the United States, at the 2017 South American U-17 Championship – where Chile finished runners-up – and at the 2017 FIFA U-17 World Cup.

He played all the matches for the under-17s at the friendly tournament, the 2017 Lafarge Foot Avenir in France, better known as Tournament Limoges, which Chile won after defeating Belgium and Poland, and drawing to France.

== Honours ==
Chile U15

- Aspire Tri-Series International Tournament: 2015

Chile U17

- Tournoi de Limoges: 2017
