= Camilo Moya =

Chilean footballer (born 1998)

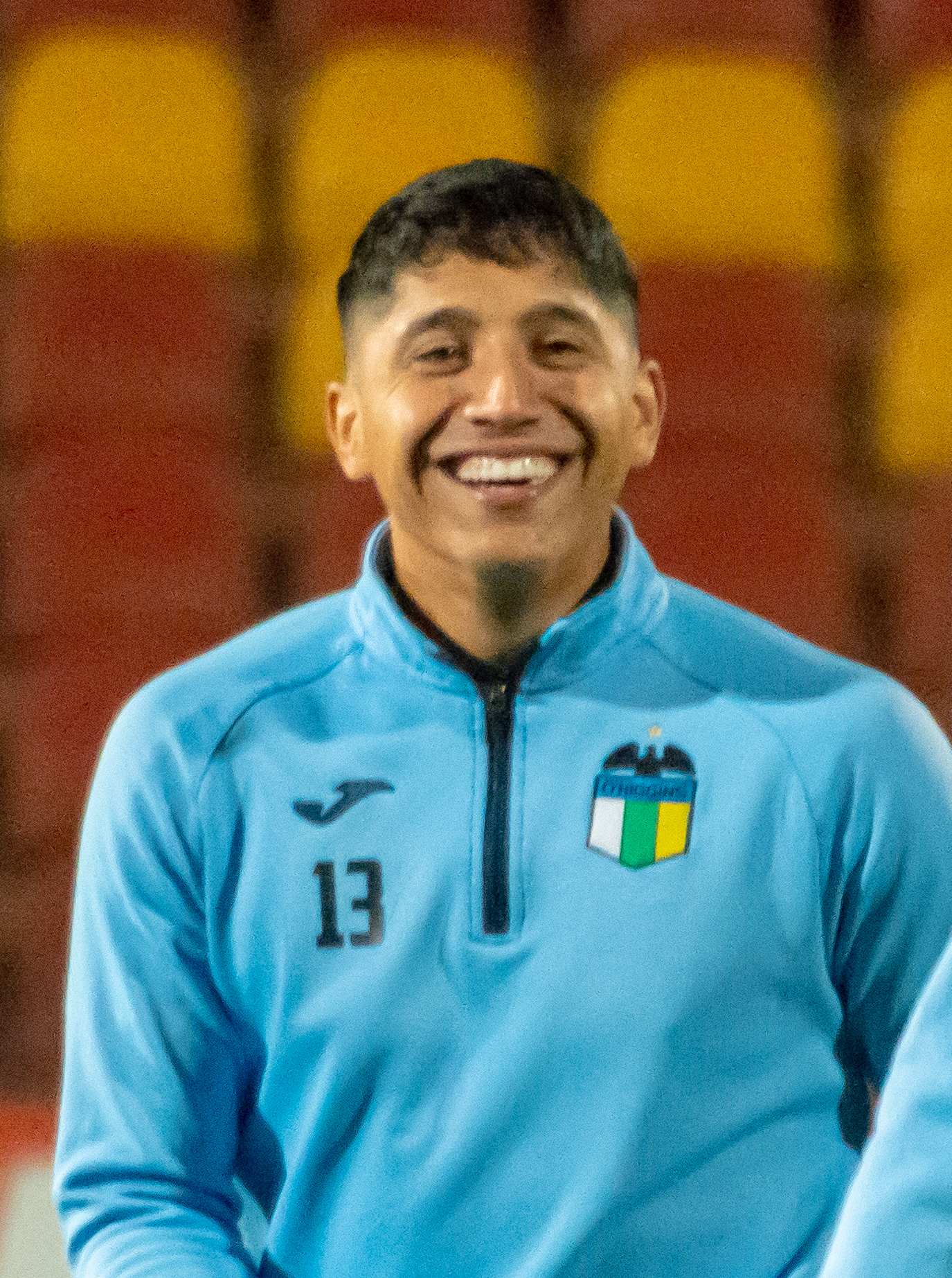
- Moya with O'Higgins in 2023

Personal information
- Full name: Camilo Andrés Moya Carreño
- Date of birth: March 19, 1998 (age 28)
- Place of birth: Santiago, Chile
- Height: 1.69 m (5 ft 7 in)
- Position: Defensive midfielder

Team information
- Current team: Unión La Calera

Youth career
- Universidad de Chile

Senior career*
| Years | Team | Apps | (Gls) |
| 2016–2022 | Universidad de Chile | 64 | (2) |
| 2017 | → Getafe B (loan) | 5 | (0) |
| 2018 | → San Luis (loan) | 25 | (0) |
| 2022–2024 | O'Higgins | 65 | (3) |
| 2025– | Unión La Calera | 0 | (0) |

International career^{‡}
| 2015 | Chile U17 | 4 | (1) |
| 2020–2021 | Chile U23 | 3 | (1) |
- * Club domestic league appearances and goals as of 18 December 2024 ‡ National team caps and goals as of 16 June 2021

Camilo Andrés Moya Carreño (born 19 March 1998) is a Chilean professional footballer who currently plays for Chilean Primera División club Unión La Calera as a midfielder.

== Club career ==
Moya began playing football in Universidad de Chile's youth system. during his term with Universidad de Chile, he was loaned to Spanish club Getafe B and San Luis de Quillota in 2017 and 2018, respectively.

In June 2022, he joined O'Higgins after ending his contract with Universidad de Chile.

Moya signed with Unión La Calera for the 2025 season.

== International career ==
Moya played for Chile U17 at the 2015 FIFA U-17 World Cup finals, helping Chile reach the knock-out stage.
