= Willian Gama =

Chilean footballer (born 2000)

Personal information
- Full name: Willian Patrick Gama Oliveira
- Date of birth: 30 June 2000 (age 26)
- Place of birth: Uruguaiana, Rio Grande do Sul, Brazil
- Height: 1.72 m (5 ft 8 in)
- Position: Right winger

Team information
- Current team: Deportes Linares
- Number: 11

Youth career
- 2011–2017: Santiago Wanderers

Senior career*
Years	Team	Apps	(Gls)
2017–2023	Santiago Wanderers	50	(1)
2023	→ Deportes Limache (loan)	10	(0)
2024	Concón National	4	(0)
2025–	Deportes Linares	7	(0)

International career^{‡}
2017	Chile U17	12	(0)
- * Club domestic league appearances and goals as of 4 May 2025 ‡ National team caps and goals as of 14 October 2017

Willian Patrick Gama Oliveira (born 30 June 2000) is a professional footballer who plays as a forward for Deportes Linares. Born in Brazil, he is a youth international for Chile.

== Club career ==
He joined the Santiago Wanderers youth system at the age of 11. Even though he was promoted to the professional squad at the age of 17 in September 2017, he made his official debut in a 2018 Primera B match against Unión San Felipe. Along with Santiago Wanderers, he got promotion to Chilean Primera División after becoming 2019 Primera B champion.

For the 2023 season, he joined on loan to Deportes Limache, winning the league title. At the end of the season, his contract with Santiago Wanderers ended.

In 2024, he joined Concón National in the Segunda División Profesional de Chile.

== International career ==
He has represented Chile U17 at two friendly matches against USA U17, at the 2017 South American U-17 Championship – Chile was the runner-up – and at the 2017 FIFA U-17 World Cup.

Also, he played all the matches for Chile U17 at the friendly tournament Lafarge Foot Avenir 2017 in France, better known as Tournament Limoges, where Chile became champion after defeating Belgium U18 and Poland U18 and drawing France U18.

== Personal life ==
Born in Brazil to Brazilian parents, he came to Chile along with his mother at the age of 9, arriving in San Felipe. Later, he acquired the Chilean nationality on 2014.

== Honours ==
Santiago Wanderers

- Primera B: 2019

Deportes Limache

- Segunda División Profesional: 2023

Chile U17

- Tournoi de Limoges: 2017
