= Hugo Araya =

Chilean footballer

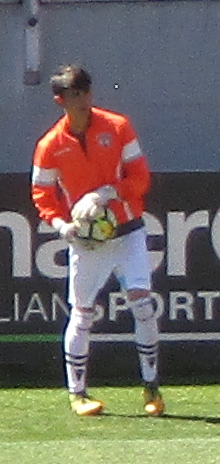
- Araya with Cobreloa in 2018

Personal information
- Full name: Hugo Eduardo Araya Tobar
- Date of birth: 26 December 2000 (age 25)
- Place of birth: San Vicente de Tagua Tagua, Chile
- Height: 1.84 m (6 ft 0 in)
- Position: Goalkeeper

Team information
- Current team: Cobreloa
- Number: 1

Youth career
- 2013–2017: Cobreloa

Senior career*
Years	Team	Apps	(Gls)
2017–	Cobreloa	45	(0)

International career^{‡}
2017	Chile U17		
- * Club domestic league appearances and goals as of 8 March 2024 ‡ National team caps and goals as of 8 March 2024

Hugo Eduardo Araya Tobar (born 26 December 2000) is a Chilean professional footballer who plays as a goalkeeper for Cobreloa.

== Club career ==
Born in San Vicente de Tagua Tagua, Araya came to the Cobreloa youth system at the age of twelve, being a member of the first team since 2017. He made his professional debut in a match against Deportes Santa Cruz on 2 June 2019 and won the 2023 Primera B with them, getting promotion to the Chilean Primera División.

== International career ==
Araya was a member of the Chile squad at under-17 level in both the 2017 South American Championship and the 2017 FIFA World Cup.

At senior level, Araya was called up to the Chile squad under Eduardo Berizzo for the friendly matches against Cuba and Dominican Republic in June 2023. He was a substitute player in the first match.

== Honours ==
Cobreloa

- Primera B de Chile (2): 2023, 2026
