= Diego Carreño =

Chilean footballer

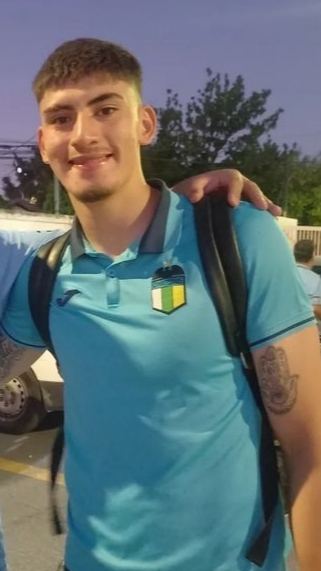
- Carreño with O'Higgins in 2024

Personal information
- Full name: Diego Alberto Carreño Parada
- Date of birth: 26 April 2002 (age 24)
- Place of birth: San Francisco de Mostazal, Chile
- Height: 1.93 m (6 ft 4 in)
- Position: Goalkeeper

Team information
- Current team: O'Higgins
- Number: 23

Youth career
- 2017–2022: O'Higgins

Senior career*
Years	Team	Apps	(Gls)
2022–	O'Higgins	15	(0)
2025	→ Deportes Santa Cruz (loan)	1	(0)

International career
2019	Chile U17		
- * Club domestic league appearances and goals as of 3 May 2025

Diego Alberto Carreño Parada (San Francisco de Mostazal, Chile; 26 April 2002) is a Chilean footballer who plays as a goalkeeper for Chilean Liga de Primera side O'Higgins.

== Club career ==
Carreño was called up to the O'Higgins first team for the 2023 season and played his first match against Cobresal, replacing Matías Donoso, after Luis Ureta was sent off at the 75th minute. In 2025, he was loaned out to Deportes Santa Cruz in the Chilean second level.

== International career ==
At early age, he represented Chile at under-17 level at the 2019 South American U-17 Championship, achieving the second place and qualification for the 2019 FIFA U-17 World Cup. Carreño was part of the final squad of this tournament, but he does not played any game.
