= Diego Soto =

Chilean footballer (born 1998)

Personal information
- Full name: Diego Alfredo Soto Riffo
- Date of birth: 22 October 1998 (age 28)
- Place of birth: Concepción, Chile
- Height: 1.70 m (5 ft 7 in)
- Position: Left-back

Team information
- Current team: Deportes Limache
- Number: 15

Youth career
- Universidad de Concepción

Senior career*
Years	Team	Apps	(Gls)
2015–2019	Universidad de Concepción	6	(1)
2019	→ Cobreloa (loan)	11	(0)
2020	San Luis	9	(0)
2021	Deportes Limache	19	(1)
2022	Deportes Iquique	23	(0)
2023–	Deportes Limache	13	(0)

International career^{‡}
2015	Chile U17	2	(0)
- * Club domestic league appearances and goals as of 11 September 2023 ‡ National team caps and goals as of 28 October 2015

Diego Alfredo Soto Riffo (born 22 October 1998) is a Chilean professional footballer who plays as a left-back for Deportes Limache.

== Career ==
For the 2022 season, Soto signed with Deportes Iquique. The next season, he switched to Deportes Limache, winning the league title.

== Honours ==
Deportes Limache

- Segunda División Profesional: 2023
