= Bastián Ubal =

Chilean footballer

Personal information
- Full name: Bastián Ignacio Ubal Peña
- Date of birth: 29 January 2002 (age 24)
- Place of birth: Puente Alto, Santiago, Chile
- Height: 1.99 m (6 ft 6 in)
- Position: Centre-back

Team information
- Current team: Universidad de Concepción
- Number: 6

Youth career
- 2011–2021: Universidad de Chile

Senior career*
Years	Team	Apps	(Gls)
2021–2024	Universidad de Chile	1	(0)
2023	→ Santiago Morning (loan)	14	(0)
2024	→ Barnechea (loan)	23	(1)
2025–	Universidad de Concepción	27	(1)

International career
2019	Chile U17	2	(0)
- * Club domestic league appearances and goals as of 20 June 2026

Bastián Ignacio Ubal Peña (born 29 January 2002) is a Chilean footballer who plays as a centre-back for Universidad de Concepción in the Chilean Primera División.

== Club career ==
Born in Puente Alto commune, Santiago de Chile, Ubal is a product of Universidad de Chile and became the reserve team's captain. He made his professional debut in the 2–0 away loss against San Lorenzo de Almagro for the Copa Libertadores on 17 March 2021. The next year, he made his debut in the Chilean Primera División in the 3–4 home loss against Cobresal on 5 November.

Ubal signed his first professional contract with Universidad de Chile in December 2022 and subsequently was loaned to Santiago Morning for the 2023 season. In 2024, he was sent on loan to Barnechea.

In 2025, Ubal joined Universidad de Concepción and they won the 2025 Primera B de Chile. He renewed with them until 2027.

== International career ==
Ubal represented Chile at under-17 level in the 2019 South American Championship, where Chile were the runners-up and qualified to the 2019 FIFA World Cup.
