= Joan Cruz =

Chilean footballer (born 2003)

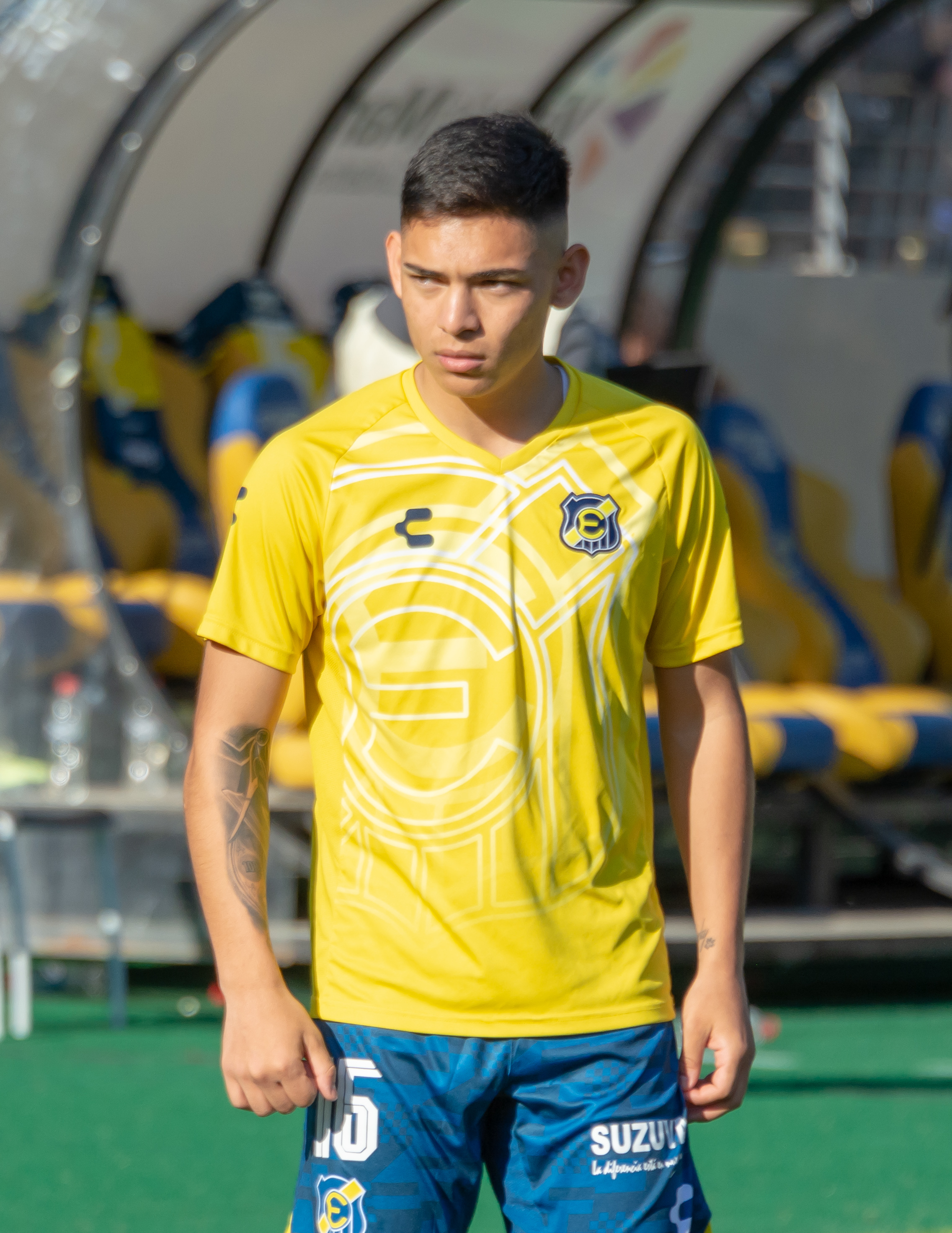
- Cruz with Everton in 2023

Personal information
- Full name: Joan Manuel Cruz Castro
- Date of birth: 4 April 2003 (age 23)
- Place of birth: Santiago, Chile
- Height: 1.68 m (5 ft 6 in)
- Position: Midfielder

Team information
- Current team: Unión La Calera (on loan from Oviedo B)

Youth career
- 2010–2019: Colo-Colo

Senior career*
Years	Team	Apps	(Gls)
2019–2023	Colo-Colo	27	(1)
2023–	Oviedo B	5	(0)
2023–2025	→ Everton (loan)	25	(0)
2026–	→ Unión La Calera (loan)	0	(0)

International career^{‡}
2019	Chile U15		
2019	Chile U17	4	(2)
2021–2023	Chile U20	16	(2)
- * Club domestic league appearances and goals as of 15 December 2025 ‡ National team caps and goals as of 20 February 2023

Joan Manuel Cruz Castro (born April 4, 2003) is a Chilean footballer who plays as a midfielder for Unión La Calera on loan from Spanish club Oviedo B.

== Club career ==
He arrived to Colo-Colo at the age of 7 years and signed his first contract as professional player on 2019, before playing at the 2019 FIFA U17 World Cup. Also, he has played at the 2020 U20 Copa Libertadores.

In April 2023, he left Colo-Colo and joined Tercera Federación side Real Oviedo Vetusta on a deal until June 2027. In July of the same year, he joined Everton de Viña del Mar on loan until the end of the season in Chile. He ended his contract in December 2025. In February 2026, he switched to Unión La Calera.

== International career ==
In April 2019, Cruz took part of the Chile U15 squad at the UEFA U-16 Development Tournament in Finland. After, he was called up to Chile U17 to play at the 2019 FIFA U17 World Cup, appearing at the four matches played by Chile and scoring two goals in the last match against Brazil U17. He represented Chile U20 at the friendly tournament Copa Rául Coloma Rivas, playing three matches and scoring a goal against Colombia U20. and at four friendly matches against Paraguay U20 and Peru U20 on 2022. In the 2022 South American Games, he made 2 appearances. In 2023, he made three appearances in the South American U20 Championship.

In September 2020, he was called up to the training microcycle of the Chile national team.

== Personal life ==
He was named Joan Manuel in honor of the Spanish musician Joan Manuel Serrat.

== Honours ==
=== Club ===
Colo-Colo

- Copa Chile (2): 2019, 2021
