= Jairo Vásquez =

Argentine-Chilean footballer (born 2001)

Personal information
- Full name: Jairo Damián Vásquez Ampuero
- Date of birth: 16 January 2001 (age 25)
- Place of birth: Trelew, Argentina
- Height: 1.76 m (5 ft 9 in)
- Position: Forward

Team information
- Current team: Complejo Deportivo
- Number: 22

Youth career
- 2005–2020: C.A.I.
- 2014–2019: → Estudiantes (loan)
- 2020: → Universidad de Chile (loan)

Senior career*
Years	Team	Apps	(Gls)
2020–2021	C.A.I.	–	(–)
2022	Deportes Iquique	5	(0)
2023	Deportes Limache	20	(4)
2023	C.A.I.	–	(–)
2024	Deportes Puerto Montt	18	(2)
2025	Catamarca FC	8	(6)
2025	Roller Center (futsal)	–	(–)
2025–	Complejo Deportivo	–	(–)

International career
2017	Chile U17	2	(0)
- * Club domestic league appearances and goals as of 27 July 2025

Jairo Damián Vásquez Ampuero (born 16 January 2001) is an Argentine-Chilean professional footballer and futsal player who plays as a forward for Complejo Deportivo Justiniano Posse.

== Club career ==
Born in Trelew, Argentina, Vásquez raised in Caleta Olivia where he was with clubs Estrella del Norte, Estrella del Sur, Mar del Plata and Olimpia Juniors as a youth player. He joined the C.A.I. youth system at the age of four and was loaned out to Estudiantes at the age of thirteen.

Atr the end of his contract with Estudiantes, Vásquez moved to Chile and joined Universidad de Chile in February 2020, returning to C.A.I. at the end of the same year.

In 2022, he returned to Chile and joined Deportes Iquique. The next season, he switched to Deportes Limache, with whom he won the 2023 Segunda División Profesional. At the end of 2023, he rejoined C.A.I.

In 2024, Vásquez signed with Deportes Puerto Montt.

Back to Argentina, Vásquez played for Catamarca FC in the Liga de Fútbol Norte de Santa Cruz and Roller Center Futsal during the first half of the year. On 26 July of the same year, he joined Complejo Deportivo Justiniano Posse in the Liga Bellvillense de Fútbol.

== International career ==
Vásquez represented Chile U17 in the 2017 FIFA World Cup, making two appearances against England and Iraq.

== Personal life ==
Vásquez naturalized Chilean by descent since his grandparents are Chilean.
