= Brian Leiva =

Chilean footballer (born 1998)

Personal information
- Full name: Brian Leonardo Nicolás Leiva Vargas
- Date of birth: 21 February 1998 (age 28)
- Place of birth: Punta Arenas, Chile
- Height: 1.75 m (5 ft 9 in)
- Position: Forward

Team information
- Current team: Provincial Ovalle

Youth career
- 2014–2017: Universidad Católica

Senior career*
Years	Team	Apps	(Gls)
2017–2020	Universidad Católica	1	(0)
2019–2020	→ Deportes Melipilla (loan)	17	(1)
2021	Deportes Melipilla	6	(0)
2021	Iberia	18	(0)
2022–2023	San Antonio Unido	41	(5)
2024–	Provincial Ovalle	0	(0)

International career^{‡}
2015	Chile U17	3	(1)
- * Club domestic league appearances and goals as of 13 February 2024 ‡ National team caps and goals as of 28 October 2015

Brian Leonardo Nicolás Leiva Vargas (born 21 February 1998) is a Chilean professional footballer who plays as a forward for Chilean Segunda División side Provincial Ovalle.

== Career ==
In 2024, Leiva signed with Provincial Ovalle in the Segunda División Profesional de Chile.

== Honours ==
Universidad Católica

- Primera División de Chile (1): 2018
