= Óliver Rojas =

Chilean footballer

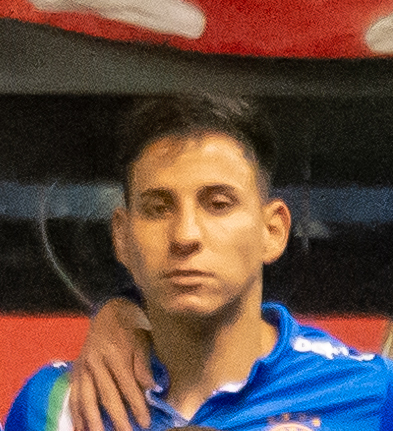
- Rojas in 2023.

Personal information
- Full name: Óliver Jesús Rojas Muñoz
- Date of birth: 11 June 2000 (age 26)
- Place of birth: Puente Alto, Santiago, Chile
- Height: 1.79 m (5 ft 10 in)
- Position: Full-back

Team information
- Current team: Audax Italiano
- Number: 2

Youth career
- Audax Italiano

Senior career*
Years	Team	Apps	(Gls)
2019–	Audax Italiano	125	(2)
2019	→ San Marcos (loan)	3	(0)

International career
2015	Chile U15		
2015	Chile U16	3	(0)
2017	Chile U17	8	(0)
- * Club domestic league appearances and goals as of 22 September 2025

Óliver Jesús Rojas Muñoz (born 11 June 2000) is a Chilean footballer who plays as a full-back for Chilean Primera División side Audax Italiano.

== Club career ==
Born in Puente Alto commune, Santiago de Chile, Rojas is a product of the Audax Italiano youth system. In the second half of 2019, he was loaned out to San Marcos de Arica in the Segunda División Profesional de Chile, winning the league title. Back to Audax Italiano, he made his senior debut in the 0–0 away draw against Coquimbo Unido for the Chilean Primera División on 1 September 2020 and scored his first goal two years later in the 1–2 away win against Ñublense on 30 June 2022.

A regular player for Audax Italiano, also taking part in both the Copa Sudamericana and the Copa Libertadores, he reached 150 official matches on 11 August 2025.

== International career ==
In February 2015, Rojas represented Chile at under-15 level, winning the Aspire Tri-Series International Tournament in Doha, Qatar. In June of the same year, he represented the under-16's in friendlies.

Later, Rojas represented Chile in both the 2017 South American U17 Championship and the 2017 FIFA U17 World Cup.
