= Pedro Campos (footballer, born 2000) =

Chilean footballer

Personal information
- Full name: Pedro Pablo Campos Olavarría
- Date of birth: 2 June 2000 (age 26)
- Place of birth: Santiago, Chile
- Height: 1.72 m (5 ft 8 in)
- Position: Winger

Youth career
- Colo-Colo
- 2014–2018: Universidad Católica

Senior career*
Years	Team	Apps	(Gls)
2018–2020	Necaxa	3	(0)
2020	Olympiakos Nicosia	0	(0)
2020–2021	Bnei Yehuda	24	(0)
2021–2022	Everton	4	(0)
2023	Deportes Antofagasta	10	(0)
2024	Tormenta FC	2	(0)
2025	SP Falcons	1	(0)
2026	Castanhal	1	(0)

International career^{‡}
2017	Chile U17	10	(1)
- * Club domestic league appearances and goals as of 5 April 2026 ‡ National team caps and goals as of 14 October 2017

Pedro Pablo Campos Olavarría (born 2 June 2000) is a Chilean footballer who plays as a winger.

== Club career ==
Despite he was in the Universidad Católica Youth Team, he made his professional debut out of his country of birth and has played for clubs in Mexico, Cyprus and Israel.

On 14 March 2024, Campos moved to American third-tier side Tormenta FC.

On 28 September 2025, Campos signed with Mongolian Premier League club SP Falcons.

Back to South America, Campos joined Brazilian club Castanhal in February 2026. After they were knocked up from the 2026 Copa do Brasil, his contract ended and returned to Chile.

== International career ==
He represented Chile U17 at the 2017 South American U-17 Championship – Chile was the runner-up – and at the 2017 FIFA U-17 World Cup.

Also, he played all the matches and scored a goal for Chile U17 at the friendly tournament Lafarge Foot Avenir 2017 in France, better known as Tournament Limoges, where Chile became champion after defeating Belgium U18 and Poland U18 and drawing France U18.

== Personal life ==
He is of Cuban descent due to the fact that his father is Cuban. In November 2016, after being nominated to the U-17 national team, Campos starred in Somos Chile (We are Chile), a web series created by the ANFP which reflects the process of multiculturalism that Chile has been going through that decade, in hopes to combat forms of discrimination such as racism and xenophobia. In the series, Campos regrets that Chileans discriminate him due to mistaking him as a naturalized person, despite being born at the country.

His older brother, Víctor Campos, is a professional footballer too, who has played for Palestino, Deportes Recoleta, among others clubs. Also, they both were in the Colo-Colo Youth Team.

== Honours ==
Necaxa

- Supercopa MX: 2018

Chile U17

- Tournoi de Limoges: 2017
