= Silvio Rojas (Chilean footballer) =

Chilean footballer (born 1977)

Personal information
- Full name: Silvio Antonio Rojas Ortiz
- Date of birth: 21 September 1977 (age 49)
- Place of birth: Chile
- Position: Defensive midfielder

Youth career
- 1989–1995: Universidad Católica

Senior career*
| Years | Team | Apps | (Gls) |
| 1995–1997 | Universidad Católica | | |
| 1997 | Magallanes | | |
| 1998 | Querétaro | | |
| 1999 | San Luis | | |
| 2000 | Ñublense | | |

International career
| 1993 | Chile U17 | | |
- * Club domestic league appearances and goals

Silvio Antonio Rojas Ortiz (born 21 September 1977) is a Chilean former professional footballer who played as a defensive midfielder for clubs in Chile and Mexico.

== Career ==
A product of Universidad Católica, Rojas took part of the Chile under-17 squad in the 1993 FIFA World Championship at the age of fifteen, where they reached the third place. Due to this achievement, the players were given some state benefits in education and housing.

He stayed with Universidad Católica until 1997 and switched to Magallanes in the same year. The next year, he moved to Mexico and joined Querétaro.

Back in Chile, he played for San Luis de Quillota and Ñublense in 1999 and 2000, respectively. In Ñublense, he coincided with Nelson Garrido and Carlos Torres, both former fellows in Chile U17. After trying to sign with another club, he retired from football due to the fact that he lost the excitement, according to himself.

== Personal life ==
Rojas is the son of the former Chile international footballer Luis Rojas Álvarez and the older brother of Luis Rojas Zamora, also a Chile international at under-17 level.

Rojas attended University of the Americas and played for the team coached by Claudio Borghi. He also attended INAF (National Football Institute) and subsequently involved in his father's business.

== Honours ==
Chile U17

- FIFA U-17 World Cup Third place: 1993
