= Didier La Torre =

Peruvian footballer (born 2002)

Personal information
- Full name: Didier Jeanpier La Torre Arana
- Date of birth: 21 March 2002 (age 24)
- Place of birth: Lima, Peru
- Height: 1.78 m (5 ft 10 in)
- Position: Winger

Team information
- Current team: Cienciano
- Number: 18

Youth career
- Sport Boys
- –2020: Alianza Lima

Senior career*
Years	Team	Apps	(Gls)
2020	Alianza Lima	2	(0)
2021	Emmen	3	(0)
2022	Osijek II	12	(1)
2022–2023	Gil Vicente	0	(0)
2023–2025	Cienciano	52	(7)
2025–2026	Fujieda MYFC	0	(0)
2026–	Cienciano	2	(0)

International career^{‡}
2019	Peru U17	2	(0)
2022	Peru U23	1	(0)
- * Club domestic league appearances and goals ‡ National team caps and goals as of 11:51, 19 March 2026 (UTC)

Didier Jeanpier La Torre Arana (born 21 March 2002) is a Peruvian professional footballer who plays as a winger for Peruvian Primera División club Cienciano.

== Career ==
La Torre started his career with Alianza Lima, where he made two league appearances. However, they were relegated during the 2020 season.

On 18 January 2021, La Torre signed for Emmen in the Netherlands. On 31 January, he made his debut for the team during a 2–0 loss to Willem II.

On 10 August 2025, La Torre signed for J2 League side Fujieda MYFC. He left the club in March 2026.
