= Lucas Kawan =

Brazilian footballer

Personal information
- Full name: Lucas Kawan Lopes dos Santos
- Date of birth: 14 February 2003 (age 23)
- Place of birth: Imperatriz, Maranhão, Brazil
- Position: Right-back

Team information
- Current team: Alverca

Youth career
- –2022: Grêmio
- 2023–2024: Santa Clara U23

Senior career*
Years	Team	Apps	(Gls)
2022–2023	Grêmio	1	(0)
2024–	Alverca	0	(0)

International career
2021	Brazil U20	3	(0)
- * Club domestic league appearances and goals as of 20 July 2024

Lucas Kawan Lopes dos Santos (born 14 February 2003) is a Brazilian professional footballer who plays as a right-back for the Portuguese club Alverca.

== Career statistics ==
=== Club ===
As of 12 March 2022.

Club	Season	League			State League		Cup		Continental		Other		Total	
Club	Season	Division	Apps	Goals	Apps	Goals	Apps	Goals	Apps	Goals	Apps	Goals	Apps	Goals
Grêmio	2022	Série B	0	0	1 (Note: Appearances in the Campeonato Gaúcho)	0	0	0	—		0	0	1	0
Career total			0	0	1	0	0	0	0	0	0	0	1	0
