= José Racchumick =

Peruvian footballer (born 2002)

Personal information
- Full name: José Antonio Racchumick Torres
- Date of birth: 1 January 2002 (age 24)
- Place of birth: Talara, Peru
- Height: 1.85 m (6 ft 1 in)
- Position: Centre-back

Team information
- Current team: Club Sportivo Cienciano

Youth career
- –2019: Sporting Cristal
- 2020: Sport Boys

Senior career*
Years	Team	Apps	(Gls)
2021–	Cienciano	1	(0)
2021–	→ Los Chankas (loan)	6	(0)

International career^{‡}
2019	Peru U17	8	(1)
- * Club domestic league appearances and goals as of 05:00, 25 October 2021 (UTC) ‡ National team caps and goals as of 05:00, 25 October 2021 (UTC)

José Antonio Racchumick Torres (born 1 January 2002) is a Peruvian footballer who plays as a centre-back for Club Sportivo Cienciano.

== Career statistics ==
=== Club ===
As of 25 October 2021.

Club	Season	League			Cup		Continental		Other		Total	
Club	Season	Division	Apps	Goals	Apps	Goals	Apps	Goals	Apps	Goals	Apps	Goals
Cienciano	2021	Peruvian Primera División	1	0	0	0	0	0	0	0	1	0
Los Chankas (loan)	2021	Peruvian Segunda División	6	0	0	0	0	0	0	0	6	0
Career total			7	0	0	0	0	0	0	0	7	0
