= Jeremi Escate =

Peruvian footballer (born 2002)

Personal information
- Full name: Jeremi Aldair Escate Gallegos
- Date of birth: 4 March 2002 (age 24)
- Place of birth: Lima, Peru
- Height: 1.75 m (5 ft 9 in)
- Position: Midfielder

Team information
- Current team: Alianza Lima
- Number: 7

Youth career
- –2020: Alianza Lima

Senior career*
Years	Team	Apps	(Gls)
2020–	Alianza Lima	1	(0)

International career^{‡}
2019	Peru U17	5	(0)
- * Club domestic league appearances and goals as of 05:00, 1 October 2020 (UTC) ‡ National team caps and goals as of 05:00, 1 October 2020 (UTC)

Jeremi Aldair Escate Gallegos (born 4 March 2002) is a Peruvian footballer who plays as a midfielder for Alianza Lima.

== Career statistics ==
=== Club ===
As of 1 October 2020.

Club	Season	League			Cup		Continental		Other		Total	
Club	Season	Division	Apps	Goals	Apps	Goals	Apps	Goals	Apps	Goals	Apps	Goals
Alianza Lima	2020	Peruvian Primera División	1	0	0	0	0	0	0	0	1	0
Career total			1	0	0	0	0	0	0	0	1	0
