= Manrique Espinosa =

Bolivian footballer (born 2002)

Personal information
- Full name: Manrique Espinosa Navarro
- Date of birth: 17 August 2002 (age 24)
- Position: Defender

Team information
- Current team: Club Destroyers
- Number: 36

Senior career*
Years	Team	Apps	(Gls)
2019–	Club Destroyers	2	(0)

International career^{‡}
2019–	Bolivia U17	4	(0)
- * Club domestic league appearances and goals as of 22:23, 17 June 2019 (UTC) ‡ National team caps and goals as of 22:23, 17 June 2019 (UTC)

Manrique Espinosa Navarro (born 17 August 2002), is a Bolivian footballer who plays as a defender for Club Destroyers.

== Career statistics ==
=== Club ===
As of 17 June 2019.

Club	Season	League			Cup		Continental		Other		Total	
Club	Season	Division	Apps	Goals	Apps	Goals	Apps	Goals	Apps	Goals	Apps	Goals
Club Destroyers	2019	Bolivian Primera División	2	0	0	0	0	0	0	0	2	0
Career total			2	0	0	0	0	0	0	0	2	0
