= Nicolás Garrido =

Chilean footballer

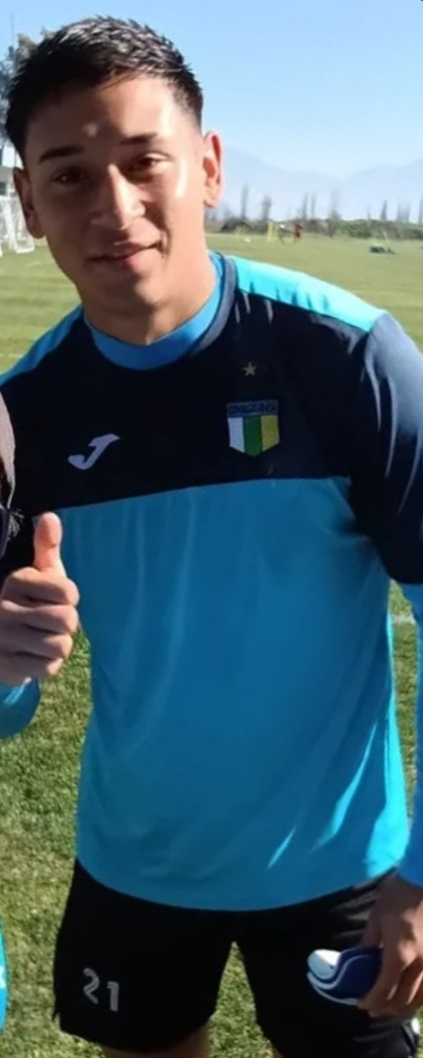
- Garrido with O'Higgins in 2025.

Personal information
- Full name: Nicolás Andrés Garrido Ceballos
- Date of birth: 27 August 2002 (age 24)
- Place of birth: Pucón, Chile
- Height: 1.84 m (6 ft 0 in)
- Position: Centre-back

Team information
- Current team: O'Higgins
- Number: 21

Youth career
- Colo-Colo

Senior career*
Years	Team	Apps	(Gls)
2019–2025	Colo-Colo	1	(0)
2022	→ Fernández Vial (loan)	22	(0)
2023	→ Unión San Felipe (loan)	30	(1)
2024	→ Universidad de Concepción (loan)	23	(2)
2025	→ O'Higgins (loan)	22	(0)
2026–	O'Higgins	0	(0)

International career
2019	Chile U17	3	(0)
- * Club domestic league appearances and goals as of 8 January 2026

Nicolás Andrés Garrido Ceballos (born 27 August 2002) is a Chilean footballer who plays as a centre-back for Chilean Primera División side O'Higgins.

== Club career ==
Born in Pucón, Chile, Garrido was trained at Colo-Colo. He signed his first professional contract at the end of 2019 and made his professional debut in the 5–1 away loss against Ñublense for the Chilean Primera División on 1 May 2021.

The next seasons, Garrido was loaned out to Fernández Vial, Unión San Felipe and Universidad de Concepción in 2022, 2023 and 2024, respectively.

On 3 January 2025, it was announced his signing with Universidad de Concepción, but he switched to O'Higgins in the Chilean top division ten days later on a deal for two years, according to himself.

== International career ==
During 2019, Garrido represented the Chile national under-17 team in friendlies and both the South American Championship and the FIFA World Cup.
