= Luis Ureta =

Chilean footballer (born 1999)

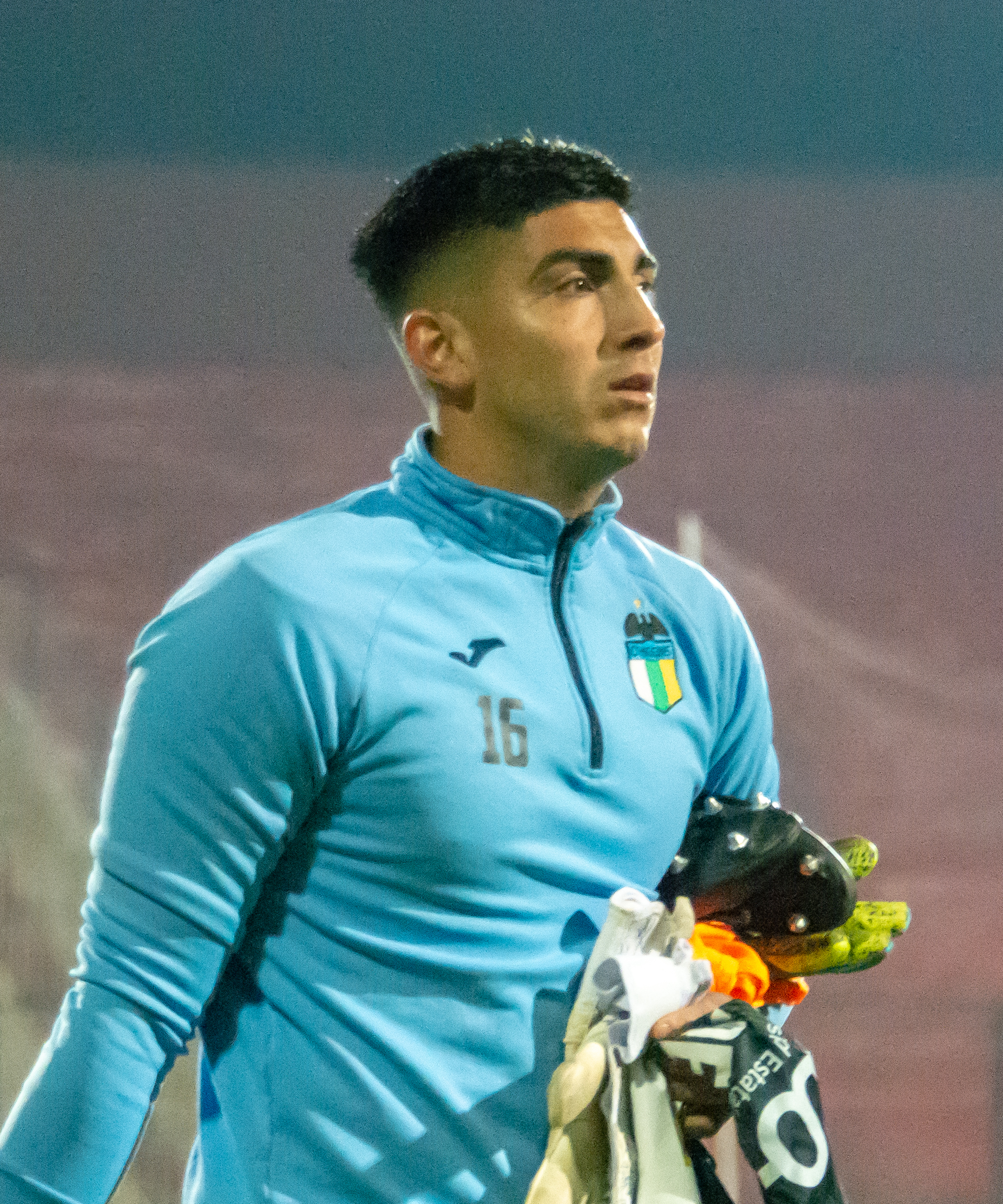
- Ureta with O'Higgins in 2023

Personal information
- Full name: Luis Alfonso Ureta Medina
- Date of birth: 8 March 1999 (age 27)
- Place of birth: Rengo, Chile
- Height: 1.77 m (5 ft 10 in)
- Position: Goalkeeper

Team information
- Current team: Deportes Puerto Montt
- Number: 13

Youth career
- O'Higgins

Senior career*
Years	Team	Apps	(Gls)
2017–2023	O'Higgins	19	(0)
2021	→ San Marcos (loan)	24	(0)
2024–	Deportes Puerto Montt	20	(0)

International career^{‡}
2014–2015	Chile U17	0	(0)
2018–2019	Chile U20	9	(0)
2019–2020	Chile U23	2	(0)
Medal record
Men's football
Representing Chile
South American Games
Gold medal – first place	2018 Cochabamba
- * Club domestic league appearances and goals as of 4 May 2025 ‡ National team caps and goals as of 31 January 2020

Luis Alfonso Ureta Medina (born 8 March 1999) is a Chilean professional footballer. plays as a goalkeeper for Deportes Puerto Montt.

== Club career ==
A product of the O'Higgins youth system, Ureta ended his contract with them in December 2023.

Following O'Higgins, Ureta joined Deportes Puerto Montt and won the 2025 Segunda División Profesional de Chile.

== International career ==
Ureta represented Chile U20 at the 2019 South American U-20 Championship, making four appearances and Chile U23 at the 2019 Maurice Revello Tournament, making two appearances. In addition, he was in the Chile U17 squad for the 2014 Pan American Games, 2015 South American U-17 Championship, the 2015 FIFA U-17 World Cup and in the Chile U23 squad for the 2020 CONMEBOL Pre-Olympic Tournament.

With Chile U20, Ureta won the gold medal in the 2018 South American Games.

At senior level, he took part of a training microcycle of the Chile senior team in September 2020.

== Career statistics ==
=== Club ===
As of 1 June 2019

Appearances and goals by club, season and competition
Club	Season	League			Cup (Note: Includes Copa Chile.)		Continental		Other		Total	
Club	Season	Division	Apps	Goals	Apps	Goals	Apps	Goals	Apps	Goals	Apps	Goals
O'Higgins	2017	Chilean Primera División	0	0	0	0	–		0	0	0	0
O'Higgins	2018	Chilean Primera División	1	0	2	0	–		0	0	3	0
O'Higgins	2019	Chilean Primera División	11	0	1	0	–		0	0	12	0
Career total			12	0	3	0	0	0	0	0	15	0

== Honours ==
Deportes Puerto Montt

- Segunda División Profesional de Chile: 2025

Chile U20

- South American Games Gold medal: 2018
