= Massimo Sandi =

Peruvian footballer (born 2002)

Personal information
- Full name: Massimo Enrique Sandi Béjar
- Date of birth: 12 May 2002 (age 24)
- Place of birth: Lima, Peru
- Height: 1.85 m (6 ft 1 in)
- Position: Goalkeeper

Team information
- Current team: Cienciano (on loan from Alianza Lima)
- Number: 12

Youth career
- –2020: Alianza Lima

Senior career*
Years	Team	Apps	(Gls)
2020–	Alianza Lima	0	(0)
2020	→ USMP (loan)	0	(0)
2021–	→ Cienciano (loan)	2	(0)

International career^{‡}
2019	Peru U17	9	(0)
2020–	Peru U20	1	(0)
- * Club domestic league appearances and goals as of 05:00, 25 October 2021 (UTC) ‡ National team caps and goals as of 05:00, 25 October 2021 (UTC)

Massimo Enrique Sandi Béjar (born 12 May 2002) is a Peruvian footballer who plays as a goalkeeper for Cienciano, on loan from Alianza Lima.

== Career statistics ==
=== Club ===
As of 25 October 2021.

Club	Season	League			Cup		Continental		Other		Total	
Club	Season	Division	Apps	Goals	Apps	Goals	Apps	Goals	Apps	Goals	Apps	Goals
Alianza Lima	2020	Peruvian Primera División	0	0	0	0	0	0	0	0	0	0
Alianza Lima	2021	Peruvian Primera División	0	0	0	0	0	0	0	0	0	0
Alianza Lima	Total		0	0	0	0	0	0	0	0	0	0
USMP (loan)	2020	Peruvian Primera División	0	0	0	0	0	0	0	0	0	0
Cienciano (loan)	2021	Peruvian Primera División	2	0	0	0	0	0	0	0	2	0
Career total			2	0	0	0	0	0	0	0	2	0
