= Diego Enríquez =

Peruvian footballer (born 2002)

Personal information
- Full name: Diego Mauricio Enríquez Gutiérrez
- Date of birth: 24 January 2002 (age 24)
- Place of birth: Andahuaylas, Peru
- Height: 1.85 m (6 ft 1 in)
- Position: Goalkeeper

Team information
- Current team: Sporting Cristal
- Number: 1

Youth career
- –2020: Sporting Cristal

Senior career*
Years	Team	Apps	(Gls)
2020–	Sporting Cristal	46	(0)
2020	→ Cienciano (loan)	0	(0)
2021	→ Cusco (loan)	11	(0)
2022–2024	→ Deportivo Binacional (loan)	67	(0)

International career^{‡}
2022	Peru U23	1	(0)
2025–	Peru	1	(0)
- * Club domestic league appearances and goals as of 23:27, 20 October 2025 (UTC) ‡ National team caps and goals as of 13:54, 11 October 2025 (UTC)

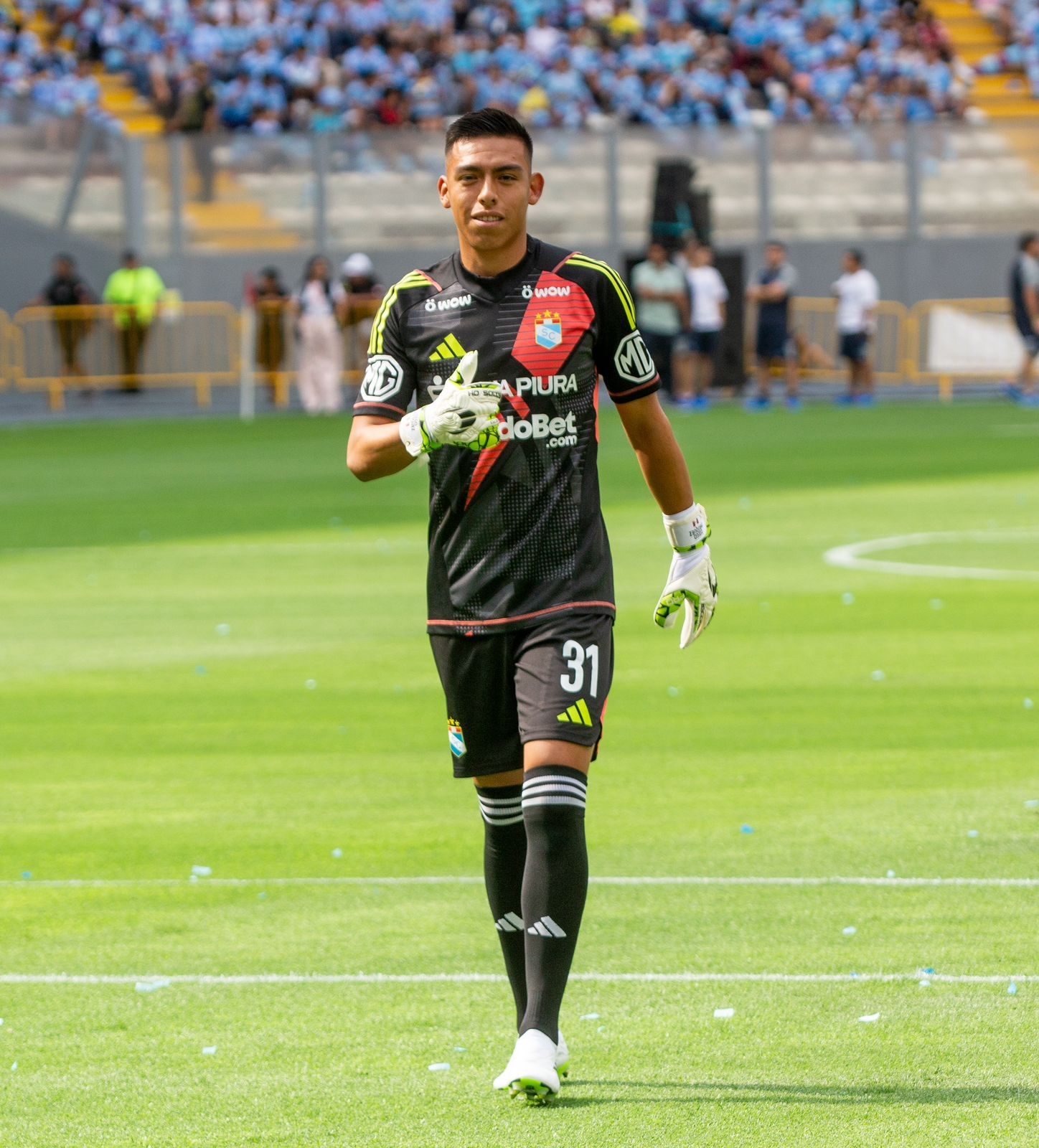
Diego Enriquez at a Sporting Cristal match

Diego Mauricio Enríquez Gutiérrez (born 24 January 2002) is a Peruvian footballer who plays as a goalkeeper for Sporting Cristal and the Peru national team.

== International career ==
Enríquez was called up to the Peru national team for a set of friendlies in October 2025.

== Career statistics ==
=== Club ===
As of 20 October 2025.

Appearances and goals by club, season and competition
Club	Season	League			Cup		Continental		Other		Total	
Club	Season	Division	Apps	Goals	Apps	Goals	Apps	Goals	Apps	Goals	Apps	Goals
Sporting Cristal	2024	Peruvian Primera División	17	0	—		0	0	—		17	0
Sporting Cristal	2025	Peruvian Primera División	29	0	—		6 (Note: Appearance(s) in the Copa Libertadores)	0	—		34	0
Sporting Cristal	Total		46	0	—		6	0	—		52	0
Cienciano (loan)	2020	Peruvian Primera División	0	0	—		—		—		0	0
Cusco (loan)	2021	Peruvian Primera División	11	0	—		—		—		11	0
Deportivo Binacional (loan)	2022	Peruvian Primera División	35	0	—		—		—		35	0
Deportivo Binacional (loan)	2023	Peruvian Primera División	32	0	—		1 (Note: Appearance in Copa Sudamericana)	0	—		33	0
Deportivo Binacional (loan)	Total		67	0	—		1	0	—		68	0
Career total			123	0	0	0	7	0	0	0	131	0

=== International ===
As of match played 10 October 2025

Appearances and goals by national team and year
National team	Year	Apps	Goals
Peru	2025	1	0
Total		1	0
