= Ariel Salas =

Chilean footballer (born 1976)

Personal information
- Full name: Ariel Esteban Salas Sanzana
- Date of birth: 9 October 1976 (age 50)
- Place of birth: Santiago, Chile
- Height: 1.85 m (6 ft 1 in)
- Position: Goalkeeper

Youth career
- 1986–1993: Colo-Colo

Senior career*
Years	Team	Apps	(Gls)
1993–1996	Colo-Colo		
1997–2001	Magallanes		
2002–2003	Deportes Antofagasta		
2004	Deportes La Serena	6	(0)
2005	Deportes Ovalle	6	(0)

International career
1993	Chile U17		
1995	Chile U20		
1996	Chile U23		
- * Club domestic league appearances and goals

Ariel Esteban Salas Sanzana (born 9 October 1976) is a Chilean former professional footballer who played as a goalkeeper.

== Club career ==
Salas came to Colo-Colo at the age of 9 and made his professional debut in a match against Everton played in the Estadio Monumental in 1995. After having no chances to play for Colo-Colo behind Daniel Morón and Marcelo Ramírez, in 1997 he moved to Magallanes. In total, he played for six clubs both in Chile and abroad.

== International career ==
He played for Chile in both the 1993 FIFA U17 World Championship in Japan, where Chile reached the third place, and the 1995 FIFA U20 Championship in Qatar. In addition, he took part of Chile squad in both the 1993 South American U17 Championship and the 1995 South American U20 Championship.

At under-23 level, he represented Chile in the 1996 Pre-Olympic Tournament.

== Personal life ==
At the same time he played for Deportes Antofagasta, he graduated as a PE teacher at the Silva Henríquez Catholic University and next got a magister degree in high-performance training at the Andrés Bello Catholic University.

He has worked as PE teacher and sports consultant in both schools and municipalities as well as the football coach of La Misión School from Calera de Tango.

He has a filled pasties and sandwiches shop called D'Primera (D'First).

== Honours ==
Colo-Colo

- Chilean Primera División: 1993, 1996
- Copa Chile: 1994, 1996

Chile U17

- FIFA U-17 World Cup third place: 1993
