= César Díaz (footballer, born 2002) =

Chilean footballer

Personal information
- Full name: César Alejandro Díaz Huencho
- Date of birth: 31 January 2002 (age 24)
- Place of birth: Vilcún, Chile
- Height: 1.77 m (5 ft 10 in)
- Position: Forward

Team information
- Current team: FAS

Youth career
- Unión Española

Senior career*
Years	Team	Apps	(Gls)
2020–2022	Unión Española	0	(0)
2022	→ Deportes Melipilla (loan)	19	(2)
2023	Deportes Santa Cruz	25	(1)
2024	Santiago Morning	15	(2)
2025	Deportes Copiapó	4	(0)
2026–	FAS	0	(0)
2026	→ Brujas de Salamanca (loan)	7	(1)

International career
2019	Chile U17	10	(0)
- * Club domestic league appearances and goals as of 25 June 2026

César Alejandro Díaz Huencho (born 31 January 2002) is a Chilean footballer who plays as a forward for Salvadoran Primera División club FAS.

== Club career ==
Born in Vilcún, Chile, Díaz is a product of Unión Española and made his professional debut in the 1–0 home victory against Magallanes in the 2021 Copa Chile. In 2022, he was sent on loan to Deportes Melipilla.

The next years, Díaz played for Deportes Santa Cruz, Santiago Morning and Deportes Copiapó in 2023, 2024 and 2025, respectively.

In February 2026, Díaz signed with Salvadoran giant FAS and was sent on loan to Brujas de Salamanca for the first half of the year.

== International career ==
Díaz represented Chile U17 in the 2019 South American Championship, friendlies and the 2019 FIFA World Cup.

== Personal life ==
Díaz was honored as Hijo Ilustre (Illustrious Son) of his city of birth.
