= Pablo Vaca =

Bolivian association football player (born 2002)

Personal information
- Full name: Pablo Delmar Vaca Justiniano
- Date of birth: 31 May 2002 (age 24)
- Place of birth: Santa Cruz de la Sierra, Bolivia
- Height: 1.81 m (5 ft 11 in)
- Positions: Defensive midfielder; centre-back

Team information
- Current team: Oriente Petrolero
- Number: 55

Youth career
- 2011–2021: Tahuichi

Senior career*
Years	Team	Apps	(Gls)
2021–2025	Always Ready	71	(0)
2025–	Oriente Petrolero	6	(1)

International career^{‡}
2020	Bolivia U20	1	(0)
2024	Bolivia U23	4	(0)
2023–	Bolivia	1	(0)
- * Club domestic league appearances and goals as of 13 July 2025 ‡ National team caps and goals as of 27 August 2023

Pablo Delmar Vaca Justiniano (born 31 May 2002) is a Bolivian professional footballer who plays as a defensive midfielder or Centre-back for Bolivian Primera División side Oriente Petrolero and the Bolivia national team.

== Club career ==
Born in Santa Cruz de la Sierra, Vaca was a youth product of the local Tahuichi football academy, where he joined at 9 years old. In March 2024, he joined Bolivian top flight team Always Ready, signing his a three-year contract.

== International career ==
=== Bolivia U23 ===
In January 2024, Vaca was called up to the Bolivia U23 team for the 2024 CONMEBOL Pre-Olympic Tournament.

=== Bolivia senior ===
Vaca made his international debut with Bolivia national team on 27 August 2023 in a friendly game against Panama. In the last minutes of the game, he failed to clear the ball on time, leading Panama to score their second goal, thus ended the game in a 1–2 defeat for his team.

In June 2024, Vaca was named in Bolivia's preliminary squad for the 2024 Copa América.

== Career statistics ==
=== International ===
As of match played 27 August 2023

Appearances and goals by national team and year
National team	Year	Apps	Goals
Bolivia	2023	1	0
Total		1	0
