= Leonel Toro =

Venezuelan footballer (born 2002)

Personal information
- Full name: Leonel Raúl Toro Linares
- Date of birth: 30 January 2002 (age 24)
- Place of birth: Caracas, Venezuela
- Height: 1.77 m (5 ft 10 in)
- Position: Defender

Team information
- Current team: Cartagena

Senior career*
| Years | Team | Apps | (Gls) |
| 2018– | Caracas | 0 | (0) |

International career^{‡}
| 2019 | Venezuela U17 | 4 | (0) |
- * Club domestic league appearances and goals as of 20:11, 21 January 2020 (UTC) ‡ National team caps and goals as of 20:11, 21 January 2020 (UTC)

Leonel Raúl Toro Linares (born 30 January 2002) is a Venezuelan footballer who plays as a defender for Caracas.

== Career statistics ==
=== Club ===
As of 21 January 2020.

| Club | Season | League | | | Cup | | Continental | | Other | | Total | |
| Club | Season | Division | Apps | Goals | Apps | Goals | Apps | Goals | Apps | Goals | Apps | Goals |
|---|---|---|---|---|---|---|---|---|---|---|---|---|
| Caracas | 2018 | Venezuelan Primera División | 0 | 0 | 2 (Note: Appearances in the Copa Venezuela) | 0 | 0 | 0 | 0 | 0 | 2 | 0 |
| Caracas | 2019 | Venezuelan Primera División | 0 | 0 | 0 | 0 | 0 | 0 | 0 | 0 | 0 | 0 |
| Career total | | | 0 | 0 | 2 | 0 | 0 | 0 | 0 | 0 | 2 | 0 |
