= Chile national under-17 football team =

National association football team

Chile Under-17
- Nickname: La Rojita (The Little Red One)
- Association: Federación de Fútbol de Chile
- Confederation: CONMEBOL (South America)
- Head coach: Sebastián Miranda
- Captain: TBA
- FIFA code: CHI
First colours	Second colours

First international
- Brazil 2–1 Chile (Argentina; April 1985)

Biggest win
- Chile 7–1 Bolivia (Caballero, Paraguay; 5 March 1997)

Biggest defeat
- Brazil 10–1 Chile (Lima, Peru; 1995)

FIFA U-17 World Cup
- Appearances: 7 (first in 1993)
- Best result: Third Place (1993)

South American U-17 Championship
- Appearances: 20 (first in 1985)
- Best result: Runners-ups (1993, 2017, 2019)

Chile national under-17 football team
Medal record

Under-17 World Cup
Bronze medal – third place	1993 Japan	Team

Chile national under-17 football team
Medal record

South American Under-17 Football Championship
Silver medal – second place	1993 Colombia	NA
Silver medal – second place	2017 Chile	Team
Silver medal – second place	2019 Peru	Team
Bronze medal – third place	1997 Paraguay	NA

Chile national under-17 football team
Medal record

Premier Under-16 Milk Cup
Gold medal – first place	1998 Premier	NA

The Chile national under-17 football team is the representative of Chile within FIFA and participates in international football competitions such as FIFA U-17 World Cup and South American Under-17 Football Championship. It is part of the Federación de Fútbol de Chile and it participated in the 1993, 1997, 2015, 2017, 2019 and 2025 editions of the FIFA U-17 World Cup tournament. As the host nation, Chile qualified automatically for the 2015 edition.

== Chile Under-17 World Cup appearances ==
=== Japan 1993 ===
The 1993 FIFA U-17 World Championship was held in Japan from 21 August to 4 September in the Japanese cities of Tokyo, Hiroshima, Kyoto, Kobe, Nagoya and Gifu.

This was to be Chile's first presentation on the U-17 international tournament stage. Attainment occurred by finishing in second place at the 1993 South American Under-17 Football Championship, behind Colombia and ahead of Argentina.

Of the four groups in the tournament, Chile were located in Group D which contained Poland, Tunisia and China. The group games were held in the city of Hiroshima and on 22 August, Chile faced China, the winners of the AFC U-16 Championship. The game ended in a 2–2 draw. On 24 August, Chile played against Tunisia, where Chile came away victorious by a score of 2–0. The third match was to be a highly contested match-up against Poland, and a battle for first place within Group D would ensue. The match ended 3–3 with Chile qualifying in second place with a total of 4 points.

In the quarterfinals, Chile's opponent was the former country of Czechoslovakia on 29 August in Kyoto. Chile went on to defeat Czechoslovakia 4–1 gaining a spot in the semifinals.

On 1 September, the semifinals featured Chile vs. Ghana. The speed, counterattacking and strength of the African players defeated the Chilean squad. The match ended 3–0 and relegated Chile towards the consolation prize of the tournament, which was third place.

The third-place position reunited Chile with Poland, where after another battle, Chile would go on to tie Poland with a penalty kick from Sebastian Rozental during the closing minutes of the match, after Chile were down most of the game with an own goal against them. Chile ultimately won the penalty kick shootout (4)-(2) and gained a third-place finish.

Date	Venue	Opponents	Result	Score
22 August 1993	Hiroshima, Japan	China	D	2 – 2
24 August 1993	Hiroshima, Japan	Tunisia	W	2 – 0
26 August 1993	Hiroshima, Japan	Poland	D	3 – 3
29 August 1993	Kyoto, Japan	Czechoslovakia	W	4 – 1
1 September 1993	Tokyo, Japan	Ghana	L	0 – 3
4 September 1993	Tokyo, Japan	Poland	D	1(4) – 1(2)

=== Egypt 1997 ===
For the 1997 edition, Chile qualified by finishing in third place behind both Brazil and Argentina in the 1997 South American Under-17 Football Championship.

The tournament was held in Egypt in the cities of Cairo, Ismailia, Alexandria and Port Said from 4 September to 21 September. Chile was located in Group A which included hosts Egypt, Germany and Thailand. On 5 September, Chile played Germany in the capital of Cairo and after a scoreless first half, Chile was defeated by the Germans 1–0.

On 7 September, Chile played the host country of Egypt in the same venue. After Egypt was winning by a goal, Chile went on to tie and the game finished 1–1. On 10 September in Ismalia, Chile's final group match featured them against Thailand. Chile defeated the Southeast Asian country by a score of 6–2, but the result would not be good enough for them to advance onto the second round as Chile with only 4 points could not surpass Egypt who came in second place with 5 points.

Date	Venue	Opponents	Result	Score
5 September 1997	Cairo, Egypt	Germany	L	0 – 1
7 September 1997	Cairo, Egypt	Egypt	D	1 – 1
10 September 1997	Ismailia, Egypt	Thailand	W	6 – 2

=== Chile 2015 ===
In 2011, Chile was chosen to host the 2015 FIFA U-17 World Cup, therefore the team qualified automatically for the tournament.

Date	Venue	Opponents	Result	Score
17 October 2015	Santiago, Chile	Croatia	D	1 – 1
20 October 2015	Viña del Mar, Chile	Nigeria	L	1 – 5
23 October 2015	Viña del Mar, Chile	United States	W	4 – 1
28 October 2015	Chillán, Chile	Mexico	L	1 – 4

=== India 2017 ===
For the 2017 edition, Chile qualified by finishing in second place behind Brazil and ahead of Paraguay in the 2017 South American Under-17 Football Championship.

Date	Venue	Opponents	Result	Score
8 October 2017	Kolkata, India	England	L	0 – 4
11 October 2017	Kolkata, India	Iraq	L	0 – 3
14 October 2017	Guwahati, India	Mexico	D	0 – 0

== Competitive record ==
=== FIFA Under-17 World Cup record ===
FIFA U-17 World Cup record
Year	Round	Position	Pld	W	D*	L	GF	GA
(China) 1985	Did not qualify							
(Canada) 1987	Did not qualify							
(Scotland) 1989	Did not qualify							
(Italy) 1991	Did not qualify							
(Japan) 1993	Third Place	3rd	6	2	3	1	12	10
(Ecuador) 1995	Did not qualify							
(Egypt) 1997	Group Stage	9th	3	1	1	1	7	4
(New Zealand) 1999	Did not qualify							
(Trinidad and Tobago) 2001	Did not qualify							
(Finland) 2003	Did not qualify							
(Peru) 2005	Did not qualify							
(South Korea) 2007	Did not qualify							
(Nigeria) 2009	Did not qualify							
(Mexico) 2011	Did not qualify							
(United Arab Emirates) 2013	Did not qualify							
(Chile) 2015	Round of 16	13th	4	1	1	2	7	11
(India) 2017	Group Stage	21st	3	0	1	2	0	7
(Brazil) 2019	Round of 16	16th	4	1	0	3	7	9
(Indonesia) 2023	Did not qualify							
(Qatar) 2025	Group Stage	33rd	3	1	1	1	3	4
(Qatar) 2026	In progress	TBD	1	1	0	0	4	2
Total:7/21	Third Place	3rd	24	7	7	10	40	47

=== South American Under-17 Football Championship record ===
South American Under-17 Football Championship record
Year	Round	Position	GP	W	D*	L	GS	GA
(Argentina) 1985	Fourth Place	4th	8	3	1	4	11	11
(Peru) 1986	Group Stage	9th	4	0	3	1	3	4
(Ecuador) 1988	Group Stage	5th	4	2	0	2	8	5
(Paraguay) 1991	Fourth Place	4th	7	2	3	2	7	5
(Colombia) 1993	Runners-up	2nd	7	2	3	2	20	13
(Peru) 1995	Fourth Place	4th	7	1	3	3	11	23
(Paraguay) 1997	Third Place	3rd	7	3	1	3	14	12
(Uruguay) 1999	Group Stage	7th	4	1	1	2	4	5
(Peru) 2001	Group Stage	10th	4	0	1	3	9	13
(Bolivia) 2003	Group Stage	6th	4	1	0	3	4	7
(Venezuela) 2005	Group Stage	5th	4	2	0	2	6	7
(Ecuador) 2007	Group Stage	9th	4	1	0	3	3	5
(Chile) 2009	Group Stage	7th	4	1	1	2	4	7
(Ecuador) 2011	Group Stage	8th	4	1	1	2	5	8
(Argentina) 2013	Group Stage	8th	4	0	3	1	3	4
(Paraguay) 2015	Group Stage	10th	4	0	0	4	4	12
(Chile) 2017	Runners-up	2nd	9	5	2	2	7	9
(Peru) 2019	Runners-up	2nd	9	5	2	2	17	9
(Ecuador) 2023	Sixth Place	6th	9	2	1	6	5	15
(Colombia) 2025	Fourth Place	4th	6	3	0	3	9	7
Total	Runners-up	20/20	108	35	26	52	154	166

*Draws include knockout matches decided on penalty kicks.

== Honours ==
- FIFA U-17 World Cup
  - Third place (1): 1993
- South American Under-17 Football Championship
  - Runners-ups (2): 1993, 2017
  - Third place (1): 1997

== By match ==
FIFA U-17 World Cup/World Championship	Round	Opponent	Score	Result	Venue	Chile scorers
1993	Group stage	China	2–2	D	Hiroshima	Neira 62', Rozental 67'
1993	Group stage	Tunisia	2–0	W	Hiroshima	Tapia 4', Neira 48'
1993	Group stage	Poland	3–3	D	Hiroshima	Osorio 38', Rozental 61' (pen.), Neira 67'
1993	Quarter-finals	Czechoslovakia	4–1	W	Kyoto	Rozental 11' (pen.), Tapia 31', Neira 65', 66'
1993	Semi-finals	Ghana	0–3	L	Tokyo	—
1993	Third place match	Poland	1–1 (a.e.t.) (4–2 pen.)	D	Tokyo	Rozental 77' (pen.)
1997	Group stage	Germany	0–1	L	Cairo	—
1997	Group stage	Egypt	1–1	D	Cairo	Villalobos 69'
1997	Group stage	Thailand	6–2	W	Ismailia	Viveros 41', 62', Maldonado 52' (pen.), Mirosević 67', Alvarez 83', Zuniga 89'
2015	Group stage	Croatia	1–1	D	Santiago	Y. Leiva 33'
2015	Group stage	Nigeria	1–5	L	Viña del Mar	Allende 81'
2015	Group stage	United States	4–1	W	Viña del Mar	Allende 20', Mazuela 52', Jara 86', Moya 90+3'
2015	Round of 16	Mexico	1–4	L	Chillán	B. Leiva 40'
2017	Group stage	England	0–4	L	Kolkata	—
2017	Group stage	Iraq	0–3	L	Kolkata	—
2017	Group stage	Mexico	0–0	D	Guwahati	—
2019	Group stage	France	2-0	L	Goiânia	—
2019	Group stage	Haiti	4-2	W	Goiânia	Rojas 11',Ceneus 45' (o.g.), Tapia 52', Tati 89'
2019	Group stage	South Korea	2–1	L	Cariacica	Oroz 41'
2019	Round of 16	Brazil	3-2	L	Gama	Cruz 25', 41'
2025	Group stage	France	2-0	L	Al Rayyan	—
2025	Group stage	Uganda	1–1	D	Al Rayyan	Torres 45+3'
2025	Group stage	Canada	2–1	W	Al Rayyan	Yañez 55', Orellana 66'

=== Record by opponent ===
FIFA U-17 World Cup matches (by team)
Opponent	Wins	Draws	Losses	Total	Goals Scored	Goals Conceded
Brazil	0	0	1	1	0	1
Canada	1	0	0	1	2	1
China	0	1	0	1	2	2
Croatia	0	1	0	1	1	1
Czechoslovakia	1	0	0	1	4	1
England	0	0	1	1	0	4
Egypt	0	1	0	1	1	1
France	0	0	2	2	0	2
Germany	0	0	1	1	0	1
Ghana	0	0	1	1	0	3
Haiti	1	0	0	1	4	1
Iraq	0	0	1	1	0	3
Mexico	0	1	1	2	1	4
Nigeria	0	0	1	1	1	5
Poland	0	2	0	2	4	4
South Korea	0	0	1	1	0	1
Thailand	1	0	0	1	6	2
Tunisia	1	0	0	1	2	0
Uganda	0	1	0	1	1	1
United States	1	0	0	1	4	1

== Former squads ==
=== 1993 FIFA U-17 World Championship ===
Coach: Leonardo Véliz (Chile)

#	Name	Pos	DOB	Club
1	Ariel Salas	GK	09.10.1976	Colo-Colo (Chile)
2	Silvio Rojas	MF	21.09.1977	Universidad Católica (Chile)
3	Marco Muñoz	DF	27.09.1976	Colo-Colo (Chile)
4	Nelson Garrido	DF	12.02.1977	Universidad Católica (Chile)
5	Gustavo Valenzuela	DF	05.04.1977	O'Higgins (Chile)
6	Dion Valle	DF	22.07.1977	Colo-Colo (Chile)
7	Esteban Mancilla	DF	30.09.1976	Colo-Colo (Chile)
8	René Martínez	MF	11.08.1976	Universidad de Chile
9	Alejandro Osorio	MF	24.09.1976	O'Higgins (Chile)
10	Frank Lobos	MF	25.09.1976	Colo-Colo (Chile)
11	Sebastián Rozental	FW	01.09.1976	Universidad Católica (Chile)
12	Carlos Torres	GK	23.07.1977	Universidad Católica (Chile)
13	Héctor Tapia	MF	30.09.1977	Colo-Colo (Chile)
14	Pablo Herceg	MF	19.01.1977	Universidad Católica (Chile)
15	Patricio Galaz	FW	31.12.1976	Universidad Católica (Chile)
16	Mauricio Rojas	FW	01.08.1976	Coquimbo Unido (Chile)
17	Manuel Neira	FW	12.10.1977	Colo-Colo (Chile)
18	Dante Poli	DF	16.08.1976	Universidad Católica (Chile)

=== 1997 FIFA U-17 World Championship ===
Coach: Vladimir Bigorra (Chile)

#	Name	Pos	DOB	Club
1	Marcelo Jélvez	GK	23.10.1980	Universidad de Chile
2	Cristián Álvarez	DF	20.01.1980	Universidad Católica (Chile)
3	Claudio Maldonado	DF	03.01.1980	Colo-Colo (Chile)
4	Denis Montecinos	DF	23.01.1980	Huachipato (Chile)
5	Pablo Díaz	DF	23.05.1980	Regional Atacama (Chile)
6	Germán Navea	MF	10.02.1980	Deportes La Serena (Chile)
7	Iván Álvarez	FW	20.01.1980	Universidad Católica (Chile)
8	Alonso Zúñiga	MF	23.03.1980	Colo-Colo (Chile)
9	Jorge Guzmán	FW	24.03.1980	Universidad de Chile
10	Milovan Mirosevic	MF	20.06.1980	Universidad Católica (Chile)
11	Juan José Ribera	MF	11.10.1980	Universidad Católica (Chile)
12	Patricio Vargas	GK	02.08.1980	O'Higgins (Chile)
13	David Cubillos	DF	12.01.1980	Colo-Colo (Chile)
14	César Pino	DF	02.06.1980	Universidad de Chile
15	Rodolfo Madrid	MF	14.05.1980	Colo-Colo (Chile)
16	Manuel Villalobos	FW	15.10.1980	Colo-Colo (Chile)
17	Juan Francisco Viveros	FW	11.08.1980	Huachipato (Chile)
18	Juan Pablo Úbeda	FW	31.07.1980	Unión Española (Chile)

=== 2015 FIFA U-17 World Cup ===
Coach: Miguel Ponce (Chile)

#	Name	Pos	DOB	Club
1	Luis Ureta	GK	08.03.1999	O'Higgins (Chile)
2	Simón Ramírez	DF	03.11.1998	Huachipato (Chile)
3	Fabián Monilla	DF	20.05.1998	Universidad Católica (Chile)
4	Manuel Reyes	MF	08.01.1998	Universidad Católica (Chile)
5	Diego González	DF	29.04.1998	O'Higgins (Chile)
6	Ignacio Saavedra	MF	12.01.1999	Universidad Católica (Chile)
7	Gonzalo Jara	MF	01.12.1998	Universidad Católica (Chile)
8	Yerko Leiva	MF	14.06.1998	Universidad de Chile
9	Gabriel Mazuela	FW	30.01.1999	Universidad de Chile
10	Marcelo Allende	MF	07.04.1999	Cobreloa (Chile)
11	Mathías Pinto	FW	13.07.1998	Universidad de Chile
12	Ignacio Azúa	GK	23.06.1998	Universidad de Chile
13	Camilo Moya	DF	19.02.1998	Universidad de Chile
14	Luciano Díaz	MF	08.05.1998	Colo-Colo (Chile)
15	René Meléndez	MF	19.11.1998	Audax Italiano (Chile)
16	Brian Leiva	MF	21.02.1998	Universidad Católica (Chile)
17	Diego Soto	DF	22.10.1998	Universidad de Concepción (Chile)
18	Walter Ponce	FW	04.03.1998	Palestino (Chile)
19	Luis Salas	FW	30.03.1998	Colo-Colo (Chile)
20	Juan José Soriano	DF	12.01.1998	Universidad Católica (Chile)
21	Zacarías López	GK	30.06.1998	San Marcos de Arica (Chile)

=== 2017 FIFA U-17 World Cup ===
Coach: Hernán Caputto (Chile) (Argentina)

#	Name	Pos	DOB	Club
1	Rodrigo Cancino	GK	09.02.2000	Universidad de Chile
2	Gastón Zúñiga	DF	19.02.2000	O'Higgins (Chile)
3	Lucas Alarcón	DF	05.03.2000	Universidad de Chile
4	Nicolás Aravena	DF	17.06.2000	Colo-Colo (Chile)
5	Yerco Oyanedel	DF	19.09.2000	Universidad Católica (Chile)
6	Martín Lara	MF	28.12.2000	Universidad Católica (Chile)
7	Ignacio Contreras	FW	11.04.2000	Colo-Colo (Chile)
8	Maximiliano Guerrero	MF	15.01.2000	Universidad de Chile
9	Ignacio Mesías	FW	16.10.2000	Unión San Felipe (Chile)
10	Branco Provoste	MF	14.04.2000	Colo-Colo (Chile)
11	Antonio Díaz	FW	26.04.2000	O'Higgins (Chile)
12	Julio Bórquez	GK	20.04.2000	Deportes Iquique (Chile)
13	Willian Gama	FW	30.06.2000	Santiago Wanderers (Chile)
14	Diego Valencia	FW	14.01.2000	Universidad Católica (Chile)
15	Sebastián Valencia	DF	13.02.2000	Colo-Colo (Chile)
16	Óliver Rojas	MF	11.06.2000	Audax Italiano (Chile)
17	Pedro Campos	FW	02.06.2000	Universidad Católica (Chile)
18	Matías Silva	DF	30.06.2000	Unión San Felipe (Chile)
19	Mauricio Morales	MF	07.01.2000	Universidad de Chile
20	Jairo Vásquez	FW	16.01.2001	Estudiantes (Argentina)
21	Hugo Araya	GK	28.12.2000	Cobreloa (Chile)

=== 2019 FIFA U-17 World Cup ===
Coach: Cristian Leiva (Chile)

#	Name	Pos	DOB	Club
1	Julio Fierro	GK	09.04.2002	Colo-Colo (Chile)
2	David Tati	DF	06.04.2002	Colo-Colo (Chile)
3	Nicolás Garrido	DF	27.08.2002	Colo-Colo (Chile)
4	Cristian Riquelme	DF	14.10.2003	Everton (Chile)
5	Daniel González	DF	20.02.2002	Santiago Wanderers (Chile)
6	Vicente Pizarro	MF	05.11.2002	Colo-Colo (Chile)
7	Gonzalo Tapia	FW	18.02.2002	Universidad Católica (Chile)
8	Danilo Díaz	MF	24.06.2002	Colo-Colo (Chile)
9	Alexander Aravena	FW	06.09.2002	Universidad Católica (Chile)
10	Joan Cruz	MF	04.04.2003	Colo-Colo (Chile)
11	Alexander Oroz	MF	15.12.2002	Colo-Colo (Chile)
12	Diego Carreño	GK	26.04.2002	O'Higgins (Chile)
13	Bruno Gutiérrez	DF	25.07.2002	Colo-Colo (Chile)
14	César Pérez	MF	29.11.2002	Magallanes (Chile)
15	Daniel Gutiérrez	DF	16.02.2003	Colo-Colo (Chile)
16	Patricio Flores	DF	30.01.2002	Universidad Católica (Chile)
17	César Díaz	FW	31.01.2002	Unión Española (Chile)
18	Kennan Sepúlveda	FW	08.02.2002	Santiago Wanderers (Chile)
19	Lucas Assadi	FW	08.01.2004	Universidad de Chile
20	Luis Rojas	MF	06.03.2002	Universidad de Chile
21	Vicente Reyes	GK	19.11.2003	Atlanta United 2 (United States)

== Current squad ==
The following players were called up to the squad for the 2026 FIFA World Cup.

Caps and goals correct as of 27 March 2025, after the match against Colombia

No.	Pos.	Player	Date of birth (age)	Club
1	GK	Vicente Villegas	23 August 2009 (aged 17)	(Football Federation of Chile) Coquimbo Unido
12	GK	Cristóbal del Río	9 February 2010 (aged 16)	(Football Federation of Chile) Universidad Católica
21	GK	Máximo Hernández	18 November 2009 (aged 17)	(Football Federation of Chile) Deportes La Serena
2	DF	Esteban Páez	2 April 2009 (aged 17)	(Football Federation of Chile) Universidad de Concepción
3	DF	Benjamín Villarroel	5 February 2009 (aged 17)	(Football Federation of Chile) Cobresal
4	DF	Baltazar Oróstica	30 September 2010 (aged 16)	(Football Federation of Chile) O'Higgins
5	DF	Lucas López	3 April 2009 (aged 17)	(Football Federation of Chile) Curicó Unido
16	DF	Martín Barrios	14 September 2009 (aged 17)	(Football Federation of Chile) Universidad Católica
17	DF	Antonio Cannoni	2 October 2009 (aged 17)	(Italian Football Federation) Modena
6	MF	Sebastián Melgarejo	1 April 2009 (aged 17)	(Football Federation of Chile) Huachipato
8	MF	Joaquín Muñoz (captain)	6 June 2009 (aged 17)	(Football Federation of Chile) O'Higgins
13	MF	Claudio Salvo	28 May 2009 (aged 17)	(Football Federation of Chile) Colo-Colo
14	MF	Nicolás Marinetti	11 August 2009 (aged 17)	(Football Federation of Chile) Universidad de Chile
15	MF	Rodrigo Catalán	14 April 2009 (aged 17)	(Football Federation of Chile) Colo-Colo
19	MF	Andher González	24 October 2009 (aged 17)	(Football Federation of Chile) Universidad de Chile
7	FW	Jonathan Guerrero	9 April 2009 (aged 17)	(Argentine Football Association) Independiente
9	FW	Amaro Pérez	3 September 2009 (aged 17)	(Football Federation of Chile) Universidad Católica
10	FW	Bayron Barrera	5 January 2009 (aged 17)	(Football Federation of Chile) Deportes Iquique
11	FW	Bayron Lizama	23 February 2009 (aged 17)	(Football Federation of Chile) Universidad Católica
18	FW	Amaro Riveros	21 December 2010 (aged 15)	(Football Federation of Chile) Universidad Católica
20	FW	Felipe Raipán	26 April 2010 (aged 16)	(Football Federation of Chile) Colo-Colo

== Head-to-head record ==
The following table shows Chile's head-to-head record in the FIFA U-17 World Cup.

Opponent	Pld	W	D	L	GF	GA	GD	Win %
Brazil	1	0	0	1	2	3	−1	0.00
China	1	0	1	0	2	2	+0	0.00
Croatia	1	0	1	0	1	1	+0	0.00
Czech Republic	1	1	0	0	4	1	+3	100.00
Egypt	1	0	1	0	1	1	+0	0.00
England	1	0	0	1	0	4	−4	0.00
France	1	0	0	1	0	2	−2	0.00
Germany	1	0	0	1	0	1	−1	0.00
Ghana	1	0	0	1	0	3	−3	0.00
Haiti	1	1	0	0	4	2	+2	100.00
Iraq	1	0	0	1	0	3	−3	0.00
Mexico	2	0	1	1	1	4	−3	0.00
Nigeria	1	0	0	1	1	5	−4	0.00
Poland	2	0	2	0	4	4	+0	0.00
South Korea	1	0	0	1	1	2	−1	0.00
Thailand	1	1	0	0	6	2	+4	100.00
Tunisia	1	1	0	0	2	0	+2	100.00
United States	1	1	0	0	4	1	+3	100.00
Total	20	5	6	9	33	41	−8	25.00

== See also ==
- Chile national football team
- Chile national under-20 football team
