= Jhon Granados =

Colombian footballer (born 2002)

Personal information
- Full name: Jhon Erick Granados Rodríguez
- Date of birth: 2 April 2002 (age 24)
- Place of birth: Meta, Colombia
- Position: Defensive midfielder

Team information
- Current team: Ferro Carril Oeste

Youth career
- Real Academia
- 2018–2020: Ferro Carril Oeste

Senior career*
Years	Team	Apps	(Gls)
2020–	Ferro Carril Oeste	7	(0)

International career
2017	Colombia U15		
2019	Colombia U17	1	(0)
- * Club domestic league appearances and goals as of 19:18, 17 July 2022 (UTC)

Jhon Erick Granados Rodríguez (born 2 April 2002) is a Colombian professional footballer who plays as a defensive midfielder for Real Cartagena FC.

== Club career ==
Granados had a spell with Real Academia in his homeland before heading abroad. In 2018, following a trial with a Portuguese club, he began training with Argentine outfit Ferro Carril Oeste. In the succeeding December, having completed residency, Granados signed a contract with Ferro. After almost two years in their youth system, Granados was promoted into the first-team under manager Jorge Cordón in December 2020. He made his senior debut on 27 December 2020 in a Primera B Nacional loss in Río Cuarto to Estudinates, after coming off the bench late in the second half to replace Fernando Miranda.

== International career ==
Granados represented Colombia at U15 and U17 level. He was selected for the 2017 South American U-15 Championship in Argentina, as well as for the 2019 South American U-17 Championship in Peru. He made one appearance at the latter, versus Paraguay, as they were eliminated after losing four out of four matches.

== Career statistics ==
As of 28 December 2020.

Appearances and goals by club, season and competition
Club	Season	League			Cup		League Cup		Continental		Other		Total	
Club	Season	Division	Apps	Goals	Apps	Goals	Apps	Goals	Apps	Goals	Apps	Goals	Apps	Goals
Ferro Carril Oeste	2020	Primera B Nacional	1	0	0	0	—		—		0	0	1	0
Career total			1	0	0	0	—		—		0	0	1	0
