= Luis Rojas (footballer, born 1954) =

Chilean footballer

Personal information
- Full name: Luis Silvio Rojas Álvarez
- Date of birth: 5 April 1954 (age 72)

International career
Years	Team	Apps	(Gls)
1980–1985	Chile	17	(0)

Luis Silvio Rojas Álvarez (born 5 April 1954) is a Chilean footballer. He played in 17 matches for the Chile national football team from 1980 to 1985. He was also part of Chile's squad for the 1983 Copa América tournament.
