= Jesús Reyes (footballer, born 2002) =

Peruvian footballer (born 2002)

Personal information
- Full name: Jesús Alexander Piero Reyes Espinoza
- Date of birth: 11 January 2002 (age 24)
- Place of birth: Huaral, Peru
- Height: 1.69 m (5 ft 7 in)
- Position: Right-back

Team information
- Current team: Santos de Nasca (on loan from Sporting Cristal)
- Number: 20

Youth career
- –2021: Sporting Cristal

Senior career*
| Years | Team | Apps | (Gls) |
| 2021– | Sporting Cristal | 0 | (0) |
| 2021– | → Santos de Nasca (loan) | 2 | (0) |
- * Club domestic league appearances and goals as of 05:00, 25 October 2021 (UTC)

Jesús Alexander Piero Reyes Espinoza (born 11 January 2002) is a Peruvian footballer who plays as a right-back for Santos de Nasca, on loan from Sporting Cristal.

== Career statistics ==
=== Club ===
As of 25 October 2021.

| Club | Season | League | | | Cup | | Continental | | Other | | Total | |
| Club | Season | Division | Apps | Goals | Apps | Goals | Apps | Goals | Apps | Goals | Apps | Goals |
|---|---|---|---|---|---|---|---|---|---|---|---|---|
| Sporting Cristal | 2021 | Peruvian Primera División | 0 | 0 | 0 | 0 | 0 | 0 | 0 | 0 | 0 | 0 |
| Santos de Nasca (loan) | 2021 | Peruvian Segunda División | 2 | 0 | 0 | 0 | 0 | 0 | 0 | 0 | 2 | 0 |
| Career total | | | 2 | 0 | 0 | 0 | 0 | 0 | 0 | 0 | 2 | 0 |
