= Kawan Gabriel da Silva =

Brazilian footballer

Kawan
Personal information
- Full name: Kawan Gabriel da Silva
- Date of birth: 6 March 2002 (age 24)
- Place of birth: Pinhais, Brazil
- Height: 1.80 m (5 ft 11 in)
- Position: Defensive midfielder

Team information
- Current team: Athletico Paranaense
- Number: 77

Youth career
- 2015–2020: Athletico Paranaense

Senior career*
| Years | Team | Apps | (Gls) |
| 2020– | Athletico Paranaense | 12 | (0) |

International career^{‡}
| 2018 | Brazil U17 | 4 | (0) |
- * Club domestic league appearances and goals as of 18:57, 13 October 2021 (UTC) ‡ National team caps and goals as of 10:36, 7 June 2020 (UTC)

Kawan Gabriel da Silva (born 6 March 2002), simply known as Kawan, is a Brazilian footballer who plays as a defensive midfielder for Athletico Paranaense.

== Career statistics ==
=== Club ===
As of 13 October 2021.

| Club | Season | League | | | State league | | Cup | | Continental | | Other | | Total | |
| Club | Season | Division | Apps | Goals | Apps | Goals | Apps | Goals | Apps | Goals | Apps | Goals | Apps | Goals |
|---|---|---|---|---|---|---|---|---|---|---|---|---|---|---|
| Athletico Paranaense | 2020 | Série A | 1 | 0 | 2 | 0 | 0 | 0 | 0 | 0 | 0 | 0 | 3 | 0 |
| Athletico Paranaense | 2021 | Série A | 0 | 0 | 9 | 0 | 0 | 0 | 0 | 0 | — | | 9 | 0 |
| Career total | | | 1 | 0 | 11 | 0 | 0 | 0 | 0 | 0 | 0 | 0 | 12 | 0 |

== Honours ==
Athletico Paranaense

- Campeonato Paranaense: 2020
