= Julio Fierro (footballer) =

Chilean footballer (born 2002)

Personal information
- Full name: Julio Esteban Fierro Díaz
- Date of birth: 9 April 2002 (age 24)
- Place of birth: Macul, Santiago, Chile
- Height: 1.83 m (6 ft 0 in)
- Position: Goalkeeper

Team information
- Current team: Unión Española (on loan from Colo-Colo)

Youth career
- –2020: Colo-Colo

Senior career*
Years	Team	Apps	(Gls)
2019–	Colo-Colo	3	(0)
2023	→ San Antonio Unido (loan)	15	(0)
2025	→ Deportes Copiapó (loan)	31	(0)
2026–	→ Unión Española (loan)	0	(0)

International career^{‡}
2017	Chile U15		
2019	Chile U17	13	(0)
2020	Chile U23	0	(0)
- * Club domestic league appearances and goals as of 3 January 2025 ‡ National team caps and goals as of 31 January 2020

Julio Esteban Fierro Díaz (born 9 April 2002) is a Chilean footballer who plays as goalkeeper for Unión Española on loan from Colo-Colo.

== Club career ==
Fierro made his professional debut in the Primera División match against Ñublense on May 1, 2021. In 2023, he joined on loan to San Antonio Unido in the Segunda División Profesional de Chile.

In 2025, Fierro was loaned out to Deportes Copiapó. The next year, he moved to Unión Española.

== International career ==
At early age, Fierro represented Chile U15 at the 2017 South American U-15 Championship in Argentina. After, Fierro represented Chile U17 at the 2019 South American U17 Championship and 2019 FIFA U17 World Cup playing all the matches.

Also, he was part of the Chile U23 squad at the 2020 Pre-Olympic Tournament, but he didn't play.

== Career statistics ==
=== Club ===
As of 3 October 2020

Club	Season	League			Cup		Continental		Other		Total	
Club	Season	Division	Apps	Goals	Apps	Goals	Apps	Goals	Apps	Goals	Apps	Goals
Colo-Colo	2019	Primera; División	0	0	0	0	0	0	0	0	0	0
Colo-Colo	2020	Primera; División	0	0	0	0	0	0	0	0	0	0
Total career			0	0	0 (Note: Appearances in the Copa Chile)	0	0	0	0	0	0	0

=== International ===
As of match played 31 January 2020

Appearances and goals by national team and year
National team	Year	Competition	Apps	Goals
Chile U17	2019	South American U17 Championship	9	0
Chile U17	2019	FIFA U17 World Cup	4	0
Chile U23	2020	Pre-Olympic Tournament	0	0
Total career			13	0

== Honours ==
Colo-Colo

- Copa Chile (1): 2019
