= José Soto (footballer, born 2002) =

Peruvian footballer

Personal information
- Full name: José David Soto Peceros
- Date of birth: 21 March 2002 (age 24)
- Place of birth: Andahuaylas, Peru
- Height: 1.80 m (5 ft 11 in)
- Position: Left-back

Team information
- Current team: Pirata

Youth career
- 2015: CD RASA
- 2015–2016: San Juan Bautista de La Salle
- 2016: EFUCH
- 2017–2018: Esther Grande
- 2019–2021: Universitario

Senior career*
Years	Team	Apps	(Gls)
2021	Universitario	3	(0)
2021	Cienciano	0	(0)
2022	UTC	9	(0)
2023	Alianza Atlético	0	(0)
2023–2024	Los Chankas	2	(0)
2024–2026	San Marcos	36	(2)
2026–	Pirata	0	(0)
- * Club domestic league appearances and goals as of 20:24, 11 March 2026 (UTC)

José David Soto Peceros (born 21 March 2002) is a Peruvian footballer who plays as a left-back for Liga 2 club Pirata.

== Career statistics ==
=== Club ===
As of 25 October 2021.

Club	Season	League			Cup		Continental		Other		Total	
Club	Season	Division	Apps	Goals	Apps	Goals	Apps	Goals	Apps	Goals	Apps	Goals
Universitario	2021	Peruvian Primera División	3	0	0	0	0	0	0	0	3	0
Cienciano	2021	Peruvian Primera División	0	0	0	0	0	0	0	0	0	0
Career total			3	0	0	0	0	0	0	0	3	0
