= 2019 in Peruvian football =

Football in Peru
- Season: 2019

Men's football
- Liga 1: Binacional
- Liga 2: Cienciano
- Copa Perú: Carlos Stein
- Copa Bicentenario: Atlético Grau

Women's football
- Copa Perú: Universitario

The 2019 season in Peruvian football included all the matches of the different national male and female teams, as well as the local club tournaments, and the participation of these in international competitions in which representatives of the country's teams had participated.

== National teams ==
=== Peru national football team ===
==== Kits ====
Home	Away

==== Copa América ====
Group A

Pos	Team	Pld	W	D	L	GF	GA	GD	Pts	Qualification
1	Brazil (H)	3	2	1	0	8	0	+8	7	Advance to knockout stage
2	Venezuela	3	1	2	0	3	1	+2	5	Advance to knockout stage
3	Peru	3	1	1	1	3	6	−3	4	Advance to knockout stage
4	Bolivia	3	0	0	3	2	9	−7	0	

Source: CONMEBOL
Rules for classification: Tiebreakers
(H) Hosts

15 June 2019	Venezuela	0–0	Peru	Arena do Grêmio, Porto Alegre
16:00		Report		Attendance: 13,370; Referee: Wilmar Roldán (Colombia)

18 June 2019	Bolivia	1–3	Peru	Estádio do Maracanã, Rio de Janeiro
18:30	Moreno 28' (pen.)	Report	Guerrero 45'; Farfán 55'; Flores 90+6'	Attendance: 26,34; Referee: Roddy Zambrano (Ecuador)

22 June 2019	Peru	0–5	Brazil	Arena Corinthians, São Paulo
16:00		Report	Casemiro 12'; Firmino 19'; Everton 32'; Dani Alves 53'; Willian 90'	Attendance: 42,317; Referee: Fernando Rapallini (Argentina)

Quarter-final

29 June Copa América Quarter-finals	Uruguay	0–0 (4–5 p)	Peru	Salvador
16:00 BRT (UTC−3)		Report		Stadium: Fonte Nova; Attendance: 21,180; Referee: Wilton Sampaio (BRA)
	Penalties
	Suárez (penalty missed); Cavani (penalty scored); Stuani (penalty scored); Bentancur (penalty scored); Torreira (penalty scored)		(penalty scored) Guerrero; (penalty scored) Ruidíaz; (penalty scored) Yotún; (penalty scored) Advíncula; (penalty scored) Flores

Semi-final

3 July Copa América Semi-finals	Chile	0–3	Peru	Porto Alegre
21:30 BRT (UTC−3)		Report	Flores 21'; Yotún 38'; Guerrero 90+1'	Stadium: Arena do Grêmio; Attendance: 33,058; Referee: Wilmar Roldán (COL)

Final

7 July Copa América Final	Brazil	3–1	Peru	Rio
17:00 BRT (UTC−3)	Everton 15'; Gabriel Jesus 45+3'; Richarlison 90' (pen.)	Report	Guerrero 44' (pen.)	Stadium: Maracanã; Attendance: 69,968; Referee: Roberto Tobar (CHI)

==== Friendlies ====
22 March Friendly	Peru	1–0	Paraguay	Harrison
20:00 EDT (UTC−4)	Cueva 4'	Report		Stadium: Red Bull Arena; Referee: Jair Marrufo (USA)

26 March Friendly	Peru	0–2	El Salvador	Washington, D.C.
20:00 EDT (UTC−4)		Report	Trauco 61' (o.g.); Cerén 90+1'	Stadium: Robert F. Kennedy Stadium; Referee: Kimbell Ward (SKN)

5 June Friendly	Peru	1–0	Costa Rica	Lima
20:00 PET (UTC−5)	Cueva 53'	Report		Stadium: Monumental "U"; Referee: Darío Herrera (ARG)

9 June Friendly	Peru	0–3	Colombia	Lima
16:00 PET (UTC−5)		Report	Uribe 23', 65'; Zapata 90+4'	Stadium: Monumental "U"; Referee: Christian Ferreyra (URU)

5 September Friendly	Peru	0–1	Ecuador	Harrison
20:00 EDT (UTC−4)		Report	Castillo 47'	Stadium: Red Bull Arena; Attendance: 21,428; Referee: Armando Villarreal (USA)

10 September Brasil Global Tour	Brazil	0–1	Peru	Los Angeles
20:00 PDT (UTC−7)		Report	Abram 85'	Stadium: Los Angeles Memorial Coliseum; Attendance: 32,287; Referee: Jair Marrufo (USA)

11 October Friendly	Uruguay	1–0	Peru	Montevideo
20:00 UYT (UTC−3)	Rodríguez 17'	Report		Stadium: Centenario; Referee: Arnaldo Samaniego (PAR)

15 October Friendly	Peru	1–1	Uruguay	Lima
20:30 PET (UTC−5)	Gonzáles 34'	Report	Núñez 80'	Stadium: Estadio Nacional; Referee: Carlos Mario Herrera (COL)

15 November Friendly	Colombia	1–0	Peru	Miami Gardens
20:30 EST (UTC−5)	Morelos 90+3'	Report		Stadium: Hard Rock Stadium; Attendance: 36,063; Referee: Jair Marrufo (USA)

=== Peru women's national football team ===
==== Pan American Games ====
Group stage

Pos	Team	Pld	W	D	L	GF	GA	GD	Pts	Qualification
1	Costa Rica	3	2	1	0	6	2	+4	7	Knockout stage
2	Argentina	3	2	1	0	4	0	+4	7	Knockout stage
3	Panama	3	0	1	2	2	5	−3	1	Fifth place match
4	Peru (H)	3	0	1	2	2	7	−5	1	Seventh place match

Source: Lima 2019
Rules for classification: Tie-breakers
(H) Hosts

28 July 2019	Argentina	3–0	Peru	Estadio Universidad San Marcos
20:30	Larroquette 6', 88'; Oviedo 9'	Report		Referee: Dione Rissios (Chile)

31 July 2019	Costa Rica	3–1	Peru	Estadio Universidad San Marcos
20:30	R. Rodríguez 55', 90+3'; C. Sánchez 84'	Report	Otiniano 14'	Referee: Adriana Farfán (Bolivia)

3 August 2019	Panama	1–1	Peru	Estadio Universidad San Marcos
20:30	Cox 39' (pen.)	Report	Otiniano 41'	Referee: Yercinia Correa (Venezuela)

Seventh place match

6 August 2019	Jamaica	1–0	Peru	Estadio Universidad San Marcos
10:00	Grey 26'	Report		Referee: Adriana Farfán (Bolivia)

=== Peru national under-23 football team ===
==== Pan American Games ====
Group stage

Pos	Team	Pld	W	D	L	GF	GA	GD	Pts	Qualification
1	Uruguay	3	3	0	0	7	0	+7	9	Knockout stage
2	Honduras	3	1	1	1	5	6	−1	4	Knockout stage
3	Jamaica	3	1	0	2	3	5	−2	3	Fifth place match
4	Peru (H)	3	0	1	2	2	6	−4	1	Seventh place match

Source: Lima 2019
Rules for classification: Tie-breakers
(H) Hosts

29 July 2019	Uruguay	2–0	Peru	Estadio Universidad San Marcos
20:30	Núñez 6'; Fernández 36'	Report		Referee: Ulises Mereles (Paraguay)

1 August 2019	Honduras	2–2	Peru	Estadio Universidad San Marcos
20:30	Vuelto 90+2'; Maldonado 90+7'	Report	Quevedo 15'; Guivin 62'	Referee: Felipe González (Chile)

4 August 2019	Jamaica	2–0	Peru	Estadio Universidad San Marcos
20:30	Beckford 55', 60'	Report		Referee: Fernando Echenique (Argentina)

Seventh place match

7 August 2019	Ecuador	1–1 (2–4 p)	Peru	Estadio Universidad San Marcos
10:00	Vivar 88'	Report	Minda 83' (o.g.)	Referee: José Argote (Venezuela)
	Penalties
	Vallecilla (penalty scored); Alcivar (penalty missed); Porozo (penalty scored); Minda (penalty missed)		(penalty missed) Barco; (penalty scored) Acuy; (penalty scored) Arakaki; (penalty scored) Pretell; (penalty scored) Rivera

=== Peru national under-20 football team ===
==== South American U-20 Championship ====
First stage

Pos	Team	Pld	W	D	L	GF	GA	GD	Pts	Qualification
1	Ecuador	4	3	0	1	8	4	+4	9	Final stage
2	Argentina	4	2	1	1	3	2	+1	7	Final stage
3	Uruguay	4	2	0	2	4	3	+1	6	Final stage
4	Paraguay	4	1	1	2	2	5	−3	4	
5	Peru	4	1	0	3	2	5	−3	3	

Source: CONMEBOL

18 January 2019	Uruguay	0–1	Peru	Estadio Fiscal, Talca
19:30		Report	Pacheco 52' (pen.)	Referee: Nicolás Gallo (Colombia)

22 January 2019	Paraguay	1–0	Peru	Estadio Fiscal, Talca
19:30	Ojeda 52'	Report		Referee: Piero Maza (Chile)

24 January 2019	Peru	1–3	Ecuador	Estadio La Granja, Curicó
17:10	Mora 24'	Report	Rezabala 8'; Alvarado 18'; Campana 58'	Referee: Raphael Claus (Brazil)

26 January 2019	Argentina	1–0	Peru	Estadio Fiscal, Talca
17:10	Romero 90+4' (pen.)	Report		Referee: Piero Maza (Chile)

=== Peru national under-17 football team ===
==== South American U-17 Championship ====
First stage

Pos	Team	Pld	W	D	L	GF	GA	GD	Pts	Qualification
1	Peru (H)	4	2	2	0	5	1	+4	8	Final stage
2	Chile	4	2	1	1	9	3	+6	7	Final stage
3	Ecuador	4	2	1	1	5	5	0	7	Final stage
4	Venezuela	4	1	2	1	6	7	−1	5	
5	Bolivia	4	0	0	4	4	13	−9	0	

Source: CONMEBOL
(H) Hosts

21 March 2019	Peru	0–0	Chile	Estadio Universidad San Marcos, Lima
19:30		Report		Referee: Fernando Espinoza (Argentina)

23 March 2019	Peru	0–0	Venezuela	Estadio Universidad San Marcos, Lima
19:30		Report		Referee: Rodolpho Toski (Brazil)

27 March 2019	Peru	3–1	Bolivia	Estadio Universidad San Marcos, Lima
19:30	Figueroa 41'; Celi 64' (pen.); Caipo 90'	Report	Chura 48'	Referee: Carlos Herrera (Colombia)

29 March 2019	Peru	2–0	Ecuador	Estadio Universidad San Marcos, Lima
19:30	Pinto 10' (pen.); Figueroa 23'	Report		Referee: Rodolpho Toski (Brazil)

Final stage

Pos	Team	Pld	W	D	L	GF	GA	GD	Pts	Qualification
1	Argentina (C)	5	3	1	1	7	4	+3	10	2019 FIFA U-17 World Cup
2	Chile	5	3	1	1	8	6	+2	10	2019 FIFA U-17 World Cup
3	Paraguay	5	1	3	1	5	6	−1	6	2019 FIFA U-17 World Cup
4	Ecuador	5	1	2	2	7	8	−1	5	2019 FIFA U-17 World Cup
5	Peru (H)	5	1	2	2	6	8	−2	5	
6	Uruguay	5	1	1	3	10	11	−1	4	

Source: CONMEBOL
(C) Champions; (H) Hosts

2 April 2019	Peru	0–0	Argentina	Estadio Universidad San Marcos, Lima
21:10		Report		Referee: Nicolás Gallo (Colombia)

5 April 2019	Peru	2–3	Chile	Estadio Universidad San Marcos, Lima
21:10	Celi 54'; Figueroa 56'	Report	Aravena 16' (pen.); Tapia 34'; Rojas 45'	Referee: Bráulio da Silva Machado (Brazil)

8 April 2019	Peru	0–2	Paraguay	Estadio Universidad San Marcos, Lima
21:10		Report	Presentado 8'; Ovelar 49'	Referee: Ángel Arteaga (Venezuela)

11 April 2019	Peru	1–1	Ecuador	Estadio Universidad San Marcos, Lima
21:10	Celi 50'	Report	Mercado 23'	Referee: Nicolás Gallo (Colombia)

14 April 2019	Peru	3–2	Uruguay	Estadio Universidad San Marcos, Lima
16:30	Pinto 42' (pen.), 48' (pen.); Llontop 90+3'	Report	Arezo 8'; Juambeltz 86'	Referee: Rodolpho Toski (Brazil)

== CONMEBOL competitions ==
=== CONMEBOL Libertadores ===
==== First stage ====
23 January 2019
19:30 UTC−4

Deportivo La Guaira (Venezuela)	1–0	(Peru) Real Garcilaso
Azócar 70'	Report

Estadio Olímpico de la UCV, Caracas
Referee: César Deischler (Chile)
29 January 2019
18:30 UTC−5

Real Garcilaso (Peru)	2–1	(Venezuela) Deportivo La Guaira
Manco 14'; Rengifo 67'	Report	Balza 90+3'

Estadio Garcilaso, Cusco
Referee: Mauro Vigliano (Argentina)

==== Second stage ====
5 February 2019
18:30 UTC−5

Melgar (Peru)	1–0	Universidad de Chile
Arias 53'	Report

Estadio Monumental de la UNSA, Arequipa
Referee: Anderson Daronco (Brazil)
13 February 2019
18:15 UTC−3

Universidad de Chile	0–0	(Peru) Melgar
	Report

Estadio Nacional Julio Martínez Prádanos, Santiago
Referee: Daniel Fedorczuk (Uruguay)

==== Third stage ====
19 February 2019
19:30 UTC−5

Melgar (Peru)	2–0	(Venezuela) Caracas
Romero 34'; Arakaki 50'	Report

Estadio Monumental de la UNSA, Arequipa
Referee: Luiz Flávio de Oliveira (Brazil)
26 February 2019
20:30 UTC−4

Caracas (Venezuela)	2–1	(Peru) Melgar
Fereira 44'; Celis 56'	Report	Cuesta 88'

Estadio Olímpico de la UCV, Caracas
Referee: Esteban Ostojich (Uruguay)

==== Group stage ====
Group A

Pos	Team	Pld	W	D	L	GF	GA	GD	Pts	Qualification	INT	RIV	PAL	ALI
1	(Brazil) Internacional	6	4	2	0	11	6	+5	14	Round of 16	—	2–2	3–2	2–0
2	(Argentina) River Plate	6	2	4	0	10	5	+5	10	Round of 16	2–2	—	0–0	3–0
3	(Chile) Palestino	6	2	1	3	7	7	0	7	Copa Sudamericana	0–1	0–2	—	3–0
4	(Peru) Alianza Lima	6	0	1	5	2	12	−10	1		0–1	1–1	1–2	—

Source: CONMEBOL
6 March 2019
19:30 UTC−5

Alianza Lima (Peru)	1–1	(Argentina) River Plate
Manzaneda 30'	Report	Ferreira 90+5'

Estadio Nacional, Lima
Referee: Wilmar Roldán (Colombia)
13 March 2019
21:30 UTC−3

Internacional (Brazil)	2–0	(Peru) Alianza Lima
López 7', 19'	Report

Estádio Beira-Rio, Porto Alegre
Referee: Jesús Valenzuela (Venezuela)
2 April 2019
21:30 UTC−3

Palestino (Chile)	3–0	(Peru) Alianza Lima
Duclós 35' (o.g.); Passerini 64'; Ahumada 77'	Report

Estadio Monumental David Arellano, Santiago
Referee: Éber Aquino (Paraguay)
11 April 2019
19:00 UTC−3

River Plate (Argentina)	3–0	(Peru) Alianza Lima
Suárez 14'; Martínez Quarta 53'; De La Cruz 90+2'	Report

Estadio Monumental Antonio Vespucio Liberti, Buenos Aires
Attendance: 0
Referee: Mario Díaz de Vivar (Paraguay)
24 April 2019
19:30 UTC−5

Alianza Lima (Peru)	0–1	(Brazil) Internacional
	Report	Rodrigo Moledo 80'

Estadio Nacional, Lima
Referee: Raúl Orosco (Bolivia)
7 May 2019
19:30 UTC−5

Alianza Lima (Peru)	1–2	(Chile) Palestino
I. González 18' (o.g.)	Report	Tarifeño 36', 53'

Estadio Alejandro Villanueva, Lima
Referee: Guillermo Guerrero (Ecuador)

Group C

Pos	Team	Pld	W	D	L	GF	GA	GD	Pts	Qualification	OLI	GOD	CRI	UDC
1	(Paraguay) Olimpia	6	2	3	1	9	6	+3	9	Round of 16	—	2–1	0–1	1–1
2	(Argentina) Godoy Cruz	6	2	3	1	5	3	+2	9	Round of 16	0–0	—	2–0	1–0
3	(Peru) Sporting Cristal	6	2	1	3	8	11	−3	7	Copa Sudamericana	0–3	1–1	—	2–0
4	(Chile) Universidad de Concepción	6	1	3	2	9	11	−2	6		3–3	0–0	5–4	—

Source: CONMEBOL
6 March 2019
19:15 UTC−3

Universidad de Concepción (Chile)	5–4	(Peru) Sporting Cristal
Rubio 45+1', 50', 80', 90+2'; Orellana 71'	Report	Gonzáles 55'; Palacios 58', 86'; Herrera 85'

Estadio Ester Roa, Concepción
Referee: Nicolás Gallo (Colombia)
12 March 2019
19:30 UTC−5

Sporting Cristal (Peru)	1–1	(Argentina) Godoy Cruz
Herrera 2'	Report	Cardona 14'

Estadio Nacional, Lima
Referee: Anderson Daronco (Brazil)
4 April 2019
21:00 UTC−5

Sporting Cristal (Peru)	0–3	(Paraguay) Olimpia
	Report	Santa Cruz 52'; Mendieta 54'; Rojas 79'

Estadio Nacional, Lima
Referee: Andrés Rojas (Colombia)
10 April 2019
17:15 UTC−5

Sporting Cristal (Peru)	2–0	(Chile) Universidad de Concepción
Palacios 30'; Merlo 33'	Report

Estadio Nacional, Lima
Referee: Leodán González (Uruguay)
23 April 2019
21:30 UTC−3

Godoy Cruz (Argentina)	2–0	(Peru) Sporting Cristal
Viera 45+1' (pen.); Lucero 47'	Report

Estadio Malvinas Argentinas, Mendoza
Referee: Jesús Valenzuela (Venezuela)
9 May 2019
18:15 UTC−4

Olimpia (Paraguay)	0–1	(Peru) Sporting Cristal
	Report	Palacios 44'

Estadio Manuel Ferreira, Asunción
Referee: Raphael Claus (Brazil)

Group F

Pos	Team	Pld	W	D	L	GF	GA	GD	Pts	Qualification	PAL	SLO	MEL	JUN
1	(Brazil) Palmeiras	6	5	0	1	13	1	+12	15	Round of 16	—	1–0	3–0	3–0
2	(Argentina) San Lorenzo	6	3	1	2	4	2	+2	10	Round of 16	1–0	—	2–0	1–0
3	(Peru) Melgar	6	2	1	3	2	9	−7	7	Copa Sudamericana	0–4	0–0	—	1–0
4	(Colombia) Junior	6	1	0	5	1	8	−7	3		0–2	1–0	0–1	—

Source: CONMEBOL
5 March 2019
17:15 UTC−5

Melgar (Peru)	0–0	(Argentina) San Lorenzo
	Report

Estadio Monumental de la UNSA, Arequipa
Referee: Alexis Herrera (Venezuela)
12 March 2019
19:15 UTC−3

Palmeiras (Brazil)	3–0	(Peru) Melgar
Felipe Melo 24'; Goulart 53'; Deyverson 70'	Report

Allianz Parque, São Paulo
Referee: Mario Díaz de Vivar (Paraguay)
2 April 2019
19:30 UTC−5

Melgar (Peru)	1–0	(Colombia) Junior
Carmona 71'	Report

Estadio Monumental de la UNSA, Arequipa
Referee: Jesús Valenzuela (Venezuela)
9 April 2019
21:30 UTC−3

San Lorenzo (Argentina)	2–0	(Peru) Melgar
Rodríguez 45'; Barrios 87'	Report

Estadio Pedro Bidegain, Buenos Aires
Referee: Éber Aquino (Paraguay)
25 April 2019
21:00 UTC−5

Melgar (Peru)	0–4	(Brazil) Palmeiras
	Report	Gómez 8'; Scarpa 21', 67'; Moisés 80'

Estadio Monumental de la UNSA, Arequipa
Referee: Carlos Orbe (Ecuador)
8 May 2019
19:30 UTC−5

Junior (Colombia)	0–1	(Peru) Melgar
	Report	Cuesta 16'

Estadio Metropolitano Roberto Meléndez, Barranquilla
Referee: Darío Herrera (Argentina)

=== CONMEBOL Sudamericana ===
==== First stage ====
21 March 2019
19:15 UTC−3

Montevideo Wanderers (Uruguay)	2–0	(Peru) Sport Huancayo
Macaluso 2'; Bravo 6'	Report

Parque Alfredo Víctor Viera, Montevideo
Referee: Felipe González (Chile)
18 April 2019
19:30 UTC−5

Sport Huancayo (Peru)	1–1	(Uruguay) Montevideo Wanderers
Salcedo 46'	Report	Pastorini 77' (pen.)

Estadio Huancayo, Huancayo
Referee: Nicolás Gallo (Colombia)

3 April 2019
21:30 UTC−3

Independiente (Argentina)	4–1	(Peru) Binacional
Brítez 37'; Pérez 45' (o.g.); Sánchez Miño 47'; Romero 65' (pen.)	Report	Collazos 67'

Estadio Libertadores de América, Avellaneda
Referee: Raphael Claus (Brazil)
1 May 2019
19:30 UTC−5

Binacional (Peru)	1–2	(Argentina) Independiente
Zeta 77'	Report	Hernández 50'; Domínguez 55'

Estadio Monumental de la UNSA, Arequipa
Referee: Cristian Garay (Chile)

19 March 2019
19:30 UTC−5

Deportivo Municipal (Peru)	0–3	(Argentina) Colón
	Report	Estigarribia 42'; L. Rodríguez 51'; Bernardi 69'

Estadio Nacional, Lima
Referee: Bráulio Machado (Brazil)
16 April 2019
21:30 UTC−3

Colón (Argentina)	2–0	(Peru) Deportivo Municipal
Sandoval 40' (pen.), 49'	Report

Estadio Brigadier General Estanislao López, Santa Fe
Referee: Luis Quiroz (Ecuador)

3 April 2019
19:30 UTC−5

UTC (Peru)	1–1	(Uruguay) Cerro
Quintero 38'	Report	Izquierdo 36'

Estadio Mansiche, Trujillo
Referee: Guillermo Guerrero (Ecuador)
30 April 2019
19:15 UTC−3

Cerro (Uruguay)	3–1	(Peru) UTC
Tancredi 21'; Pellejero 41', 74'	Report	Ciucci 70'

Estadio Luis Franzini, Montevideo
Referee: Ángel Arteaga (Venezuela)

==== Second stage ====
21 May 2019
20:30 UTC−4

Unión Española (Chile)	0–3	(Peru) Sporting Cristal
	Report	Gonzáles 6'; Ortiz 66', 71'

Estadio Santa Laura, Santiago
Referee: Guillermo Guerrero (Ecuador)
28 May 2019
19:30 UTC−5

Sporting Cristal (Peru)	3–0	(Chile) Unión Española
Palacios 26' (pen.); Ortiz 43'; Gonzáles 51' (pen.)	Report

Estadio Alejandro Villanueva, Lima
Referee: Arnaldo Samaniego (Paraguay)

21 May 2019
17:15 UTC−5

Universidad Católica (Ecuador)	6−0	(Peru) Melgar
Carcelén 24'; J. Chalá 30'; Vides 41' (pen.); W. Chalá 56'; B. Oña 77'; Cortéz 90+1'	Report

Estadio Olímpico Atahualpa, Quito
Referee: Ángel Arteaga (Venezuela)
28 May 2019
17:15 UTC−5

Melgar (Peru)	0−0	(Ecuador) Universidad Católica
	Report

Estadio Monumental de la UNSA, Arequipa
Referee: Dewson Freitas (Brazil)

==== Round of 16 ====
23 July 2019
16:00 UTC−4

Zulia (Venezuela)	1–0	(Peru) Sporting Cristal
Feltscher 59'	Report

Estadio José Pachencho Romero, Maracaibo
Referee: Éber Aquino (Paraguay)
30 July 2019
17:15 UTC−5

Sporting Cristal (Peru)	3–2	(Venezuela) Zulia
Sandoval 69', 90+5'; Gonzáles 74'	Report	Maldonado 12'; Moya 85'

Estadio Alejandro Villanueva, Lima
Referee: Anderson Daronco (Brazil)

== Men's football ==
=== Liga 1 ===
==== Torneo Apertura ====
Pos	Team	Pld	W	D	L	GF	GA	GD	Pts	Qualification
1	Binacional	17	12	0	5	44	23	+21	36	Advance to Playoffs and qualification for Copa Libertadores
2	Sporting Cristal	17	9	5	3	28	13	+15	32	
3	Universidad César Vallejo	17	9	2	6	25	21	+4	29	
4	Deportivo Municipal (Note: Deportivo Municipal and Pirata were deducted one point as punishment for failing to pay debts.)	17	7	7	3	27	20	+7	27	
5	Alianza Lima	17	7	5	5	30	24	+6	26	
6	Real Garcilaso	17	7	5	5	19	15	+4	26	
7	Ayacucho	17	7	4	6	26	23	+3	25	
8	UTC	17	6	7	4	26	24	+2	25	
9	Cantolao	17	6	7	4	18	17	+1	25	
10	Sport Huancayo	17	6	6	5	22	23	−1	24	
11	Melgar	17	6	5	6	26	25	+1	23	
12	Universitario	17	6	5	6	25	27	−2	23	
13	Alianza Universidad	17	5	7	5	18	18	0	22	
14	Carlos A. Mannucci	17	4	4	9	22	27	−5	16	
15	Unión Comercio	17	3	6	8	15	21	−6	15	
16	Universidad San Martín	17	3	6	8	13	32	−19	15	
17	Pirata	17	3	5	9	17	29	−12	13	
18	Sport Boys	17	2	4	11	9	28	−19	10	

Source: ADFP, Soccerway
Rules for classification: 1) Points; 2) Goal difference; 3) Goals for; 4) Fair play points; 5) Drawing of lots; 6) Play-off (only if needed to decide first place).
If two teams are tied in points for first place: 2) Play-off.

==== Torneo Clausura ====
Pos	Team	Pld	W	D	L	GF	GA	GD	Pts	Qualification
1	Alianza Lima	17	10	5	2	32	23	+9	35	Advance to Playoffs and qualification for Copa Libertadores
2	Universitario	17	9	6	2	16	10	+6	33	
3	Sporting Cristal	17	9	4	4	31	20	+11	31	
4	Binacional	17	7	7	3	30	13	+17	28	
5	Carlos A. Mannucci	17	7	7	3	20	19	+1	28	
6	Sport Boys	17	7	6	4	23	21	+2	27	
7	Universidad San Martín	17	6	8	3	21	15	+6	26	
8	Sport Huancayo	17	7	5	5	24	21	+3	26	
9	Melgar	17	7	3	7	29	22	+7	24	
10	Ayacucho	17	6	4	7	17	21	−4	22	
11	Real Garcilaso	17	6	3	8	19	16	+3	21	
12	Unión Comercio	17	5	4	8	21	27	−6	19	
13	Alianza Universidad	17	5	4	8	17	26	−9	19	
14	Universidad César Vallejo	17	4	6	7	15	19	−4	18	
15	Cantolao	17	4	5	8	23	30	−7	17	
16	UTC	17	2	8	7	12	22	−10	14	
17	Pirata (Note: Pirata were deducted four points as punishment for failing to pay debts.)	17	3	4	10	12	30	−18	9	
18	Deportivo Municipal (Note: Deportivo Municipal were deducted five points as punishment for failing to pay debts.)	17	3	4	10	20	27	−7	8	

Source: ADFP, Soccerway
Rules for classification: 1) Points; 2) Goal difference; 3) Goals for; 4) Fair play points; 5) Drawing of lots; 6) Play-off (only if needed to decide first place).
If two teams are tied in points for first place: 2) Play-off.

==== Aggregate table ====
Pos	Team	Pld	W	D	L	GF	GA	GD	Pts	Qualification
1	Sporting Cristal (Note: Sporting Cristal were awarded 2 points for winning the 2019 Torneo de Promoción y Reserva.)	34	18	9	7	59	33	+26	65	Qualification for Playoffs and Copa Libertadores second stage
2	Binacional (C)	34	19	7	8	74	36	+38	64	Qualification for Playoffs and Copa Libertadores group stage
3	Alianza Lima	34	17	10	7	62	47	+15	61	Qualification for Playoffs and Copa Libertadores group stage
4	Universitario	34	15	11	8	41	37	+4	56	Qualification for Copa Libertadores first stage
5	Sport Huancayo (Note: Sport Huancayo were awarded 1 point for ending as Torneo de Promoción y Reserva runners-up.)	34	13	11	10	46	44	+2	51	Qualification for Copa Sudamericana first stage
6	Melgar	34	13	8	13	55	47	+8	47	Qualification for Copa Sudamericana first stage
7	Real Garcilaso	34	13	8	13	38	31	+7	47	Qualification for Copa Sudamericana first stage
8	Universidad César Vallejo	34	13	8	13	40	40	0	47	
9	Ayacucho	34	13	8	13	43	44	−1	47	
10	Carlos A. Mannucci	34	11	11	12	42	46	−4	44	
11	Cantolao	34	10	11	13	41	47	−6	41	
12	Alianza Universidad	34	10	11	13	35	44	−9	41	
13	Universidad San Martín	34	9	14	11	34	47	−13	41	
14	UTC	34	8	15	11	38	46	−8	39	
15	Sport Boys	34	9	10	15	32	49	−17	37	
16	Deportivo Municipal (Note: Deportivo Municipal were deducted six points as punishment for failing to pay debts.)	34	10	11	13	47	47	0	35	
17	Unión Comercio (R)	34	8	10	16	36	48	−12	34	Relegation to 2020 Liga 2
18	Pirata (Note: Pirata were deducted five points as punishment for failing to pay debts.) (R)	34	6	9	19	29	59	−30	22	Relegation to 2020 Liga 2

Source: ADFP
Rules for classification: 1) Points; 2) Goal difference; 3) Goals for; 4) Drawing of lots; 5) Play-off (only if needed to decide teams for relegation).
If two teams are tied in points for penultimate place: 2) Play-off.
(C) Champions; (R) Relegated

==== Semi-final ====
1 December 2019
15:30
First leg

Alianza Lima	1–0	Sporting Cristal
Fuentes 90+3'	Report

Estadio Alejandro Villanueva, Lima
Referee: Diego Haro
4 December 2019
20:00
Second leg

Sporting Cristal	1–1	Alianza Lima
Beltrán 61' (o.g.)	Report	Ramírez 14'

Estadio Nacional, Lima
Referee: Miguel Santiváñez

==== Final ====
8 December 2019
15:00
First leg

Binacional	4–1	Alianza Lima
Ojeda 42'; Aubert 51'; Rodríguez 54'; Millán 89' (pen.)		Rodríguez 22'

Estadio Guillermo Briceño Rosamedina, Juliaca
Referee: Michael Espinoza
15 December 2019
15:30
Second leg

Alianza Lima	2–0	Binacional
Ramírez 34'; Fajardo 77' (o.g.)

Estadio Alejandro Villanueva, Lima
Referee: Patricio Loustau (Argentina)

Binacional won the cup after defeating Alianza Lima.

=== Copa Bicentenario ===
==== Final ====
The Copa Bicentenario final was played between Atlético Grau and Sport Huancayo.

7 November 2019
20:00

Atlético Grau	0–0	Sport Huancayo
Penalties
Jair Yglesias (penalty scored); Roberto Céspedes (penalty missed); Jonathan Acasiete (penalty scored); Juan Neira (penalty scored); Matías Sen (penalty scored)	4–3	Marcio Valverde (penalty scored); Koichi Aparicio (penalty scored); Manuel Corrales (penalty scored); Carlos Neumann (penalty missed); Daniel Morales (penalty missed)

Miguel Grau, Callao
Referee: Edwin Ordóñez

Atlético Grau won the cup after defeating Sport Huancayo.

=== Liga 2 ===
==== League table ====
Pos	Team	Pld	W	D	L	GF	GA	GD	Pts	Qualification
1	Cienciano	22	14	2	6	56	26	+30	44	2020 Liga 1
2	Alianza Atlético	22	13	4	5	45	21	+24	43	Advance to Liguilla Semifinals
3	Juan Aurich	22	13	3	6	35	24	+11	42	Advance to Liguilla Semifinals
4	Atlético Grau	22	13	2	7	52	30	+22	41	Advance to Liguilla Quarterfinals
5	Santos	22	12	5	5	29	21	+8	41	Advance to Liguilla Quarterfinals
6	Deportivo Coopsol	22	12	3	7	39	27	+12	39	Advance to Liguilla Quarterfinals
7	Comerciantes Unidos	22	10	3	9	32	32	0	33	Advance to Liguilla Quarterfinals
8	Unión Huaral	22	8	7	7	30	29	+1	31	
9	Cultural Santa Rosa	22	9	3	10	25	33	−8	30	
10	Sport Loreto	22	5	3	14	27	46	−19	15 (Note: Sport Loreto was docked a total of 3 points for outstanding debts with the SAFAP.)	Relegation to 2021 Copa Perú
11	Los Caimanes	22	2	2	18	21	54	−33	5 (Note: Los Caimanes was docked a total of 3 points for outstanding debts with the SAFAP.)	Relegation to 2021 Copa Perú
12	Sport Victoria (Note: Sport Victoria was disabled mid-season and relegated to the Copa Perú for outstanding debts with the SAFAP.)	22	2	1	19	9	56	−47	7	Withdrew from league and relegation to 2021 Copa Perú

Source: Liga 2 - official site
Rules for classification: 1) points; 2) goal difference; 3) goals scored; 4) draw.

==== Liguilla ====
Quarterfinals

Comerciantes Unidos	3–2	Atlético Grau

Atlético Grau	3–0	Comerciantes Unidos

Deportivo Coopsol	1–0	Santos

Santos	0–4	Deportivo Coopsol

Semifinals

Deportivo Coopsol	1–0	Alianza Atlético

Alianza Atlético	1–1	Deportivo Coopsol

Atlético Grau	4–1	Juan Aurich

Juan Aurich	2–0	Atlético Grau

=== Copa Perú ===
==== Final group stage ====
Pos	Team	Pld	W	D	L	GF	GA	GD	Pts	Qualification
1	Carlos Stein	3	2	1	0	6	2	+4	7	2020 Liga 1
2	Deportivo Llacuabamba	3	1	1	1	6	4	+2	4	Promotion Play-off
3	Sport Chavelines	3	0	2	1	3	4	−1	2	Promotion Play-off
4	Sport Estrella	3	0	2	1	2	7	−5	2	

Source: Dechalaca.com
Rules for classification: 1) points; 2) goal difference; 3) goals scored; 4) draw.

=== Promotion play-offs ===
Pos	Team	Pld	W	D	L	GF	GA	GD	Pts	Qualification
1	Atlético Grau	3	1	2	0	2	0	+2	5	2020 Liga 1
2	Deportivo Llacuabamba	3	1	2	0	3	2	+1	5	2020 Liga 1
3	Deportivo Coopsol	3	1	1	1	5	3	+2	4	2020 Liga 2
4	Sport Chavelines	3	0	1	2	1	6	−5	1	2020 Liga 2

Updated to match(es) played on unknown. Source:
Rules for classification: 1) points; 2) goal difference; 3) goals scored; 4) draw.

== Women's football ==
=== Copa Peru ===
The Copa Peru final was played between Universitario and Amazon Sky.

21 December 2019
Final

Universitario	6–1	Amazon Sky
	Report

Universitario won the cup after defeating Amazon Sky.
