= 2019 South American U-17 Championship =

Campeonato Sudamericano Sub-17 Perú 2019
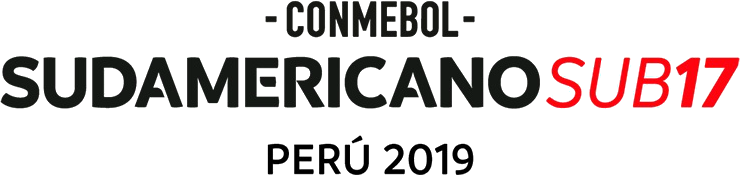

Tournament details
- Host country: Peru
- City: Lima
- Dates: 21 March – 14 April
- Teams: 10 (from 1 confederation)
- Venue: 1 (in 1 host city)

Final positions
- Champions: Argentina (4th title)
- Runners-up: Chile
- Third place: Paraguay
- Fourth place: Ecuador

Tournament statistics
- Matches played: 35
- Goals scored: 106 (3.03 per match)
- Top scorer: (Ecuador) Johan Mina (6 goals)
- Fair play award: Ecuador

The 2019 South American U-17 Championship (Spanish: Campeonato Sudamericano Sub-17 Perú 2019, Brazilian Portuguese: Campeonato Sul-Americano Sub-17 Peru 2019) was the 18th edition of the South American U-17 Championship, the biennial international youth football championship organised by CONMEBOL for the men's under-17 national teams of South America. It was held in Peru from 21 March to 14 April 2019.

The top four teams, champions Argentina, which won their fourth title, Chile, Paraguay, and Ecuador, qualified for the 2019 FIFA U-17 World Cup in Brazil as the CONMEBOL representatives, besides Brazil who qualified automatically as hosts replacing Peru, despite failing to qualify out of the first stage as defending champions for the first time.

== Teams ==
All ten CONMEBOL member national teams entered the tournament.

Team	Appearance	Previous best performance
Argentina	18th	Champions (3 times, most recent 2013)
Bolivia	18th	Champions (1 time, 1986)
Brazil (holders)	18th	Champions (12 times, most recent 2017)
Chile	18th	Runners-up (2 times, most recent 2017)
Colombia	18th	Champions (1 time, 1993)
Ecuador	17th	Third place (4 times, most recent 2015)
Paraguay	17th	Runners-up (1 time, 1999)
Peru (hosts)	18th	Fourth place (1 time, 2007)
Uruguay	18th	Runners-up (3 times, most recent 2011)
Venezuela	18th	Runners-up (1 time, 2013)

== Venues ==
Peru was confirmed as host of the tournament at the CONMEBOL Council meeting held on 22 January 2019 in Rio de Janeiro. All games were scheduled to be played in Lima at the Estadio Universidad San Marcos.

Lima	2019 South American U-17 Championship is located in Peru
Estadio Universidad San Marcos	2019 South American U-17 Championship is located in Peru
Capacity: 22,000	2019 South American U-17 Championship is located in Peru
12.057°S 77.075°W	2019 South American U-17 Championship is located in Peru

== Squads ==
Players born on or after 1 January 2002 are eligible to compete. Each team can register a squad of 23 players (three of whom must be goalkeepers).

== Draw ==
The draw of the tournament was held on 27 February 2019, 12:00 PET (UTC−5), at the Peruvian Football Federation headquarters in Lima, Peru. The ten teams were drawn into two groups of five. The host Peru and the defending champions Brazil were seeded into Group A and Group B respectively and assigned to position 1 in their group, while the remaining eight teams were placed into four "pairing pots" according to their final positions in the 2017 South American U-17 Championship (shown in brackets).

Seeded	Pot 1	Pot 2	Pot 3	Pot 4
Peru (10) (Hosts, assigned to A1); Brazil (1) (Title holders, assigned to B1)	Chile (2); Paraguay (3)	Colombia (4); Venezuela (5)	Ecuador (6); Uruguay (7)	Argentina (8); Bolivia (9)

== Match officials ==
The referees and assistants referees were:

- (Argentina) Fernando Espinoza
  - Assistants: Maximiliano Del Yesso and Pablo González
- (Bolivia) Ivo Méndez
  - Assistants: Reluy Vallejos and Ariel Guizada
- (Brazil) Rodolpho Toski
  - Assistants: Fabricio Vilarinho and Guilherme Dias Camilo
- (Chile) Cristian Garay
  - Assistants: Alejandro Molina and Claudio Urrutia
- (Colombia) Carlos Herrera
  - Assistants: Sebastián Vela and John Gallego
- (Ecuador) Luis Quiroz
  - Assistants: Edwin Bravo and Flavio Nall
- (Paraguay) Juan Gabriel Benítez
  - Assistants: Rodney Aquino and Carlos Cáceres
- (Peru) Kevin Ortega
  - Assistants: Coty Carrera and Jesús Sánchez
- (Uruguay) Andrés Matonte
  - Assistants: Horacio Ferreiro and Martín Soppi
- (Venezuela) Ángel Arteaga
  - Assistants: Lubin Torrealba and Alberto Ponte

Support Referees

- (Bolivia) Juan Nelio García (Final stage)
- (Brazil) Bráulio da Silva Machado (Final stage)
- (Colombia) Nicolás Gallo (Final stage)
- (Ecuador) Franklin Congo (First stage)
- (Paraguay) Derlis López (First stage)
- (Venezuela) Juan Soto (Final stage)

== First stage ==
The top three teams in each group advance to the final stage.

All times local, PET (UTC−5).

=== Group A ===
Pos	Team	Pld	W	D	L	GF	GA	GD	Pts	Qualification
1	Peru (H)	4	2	2	0	5	1	+4	8	Final stage
2	Chile	4	2	1	1	9	3	+6	7	Final stage
3	Ecuador	4	2	1	1	5	5	0	7	Final stage
4	Venezuela	4	1	2	1	6	7	−1	5	
5	Bolivia	4	0	0	4	4	13	−9	0	

Source: CONMEBOL
(H) Hosts
21 March 2019
17:10

Venezuela	1–1	Ecuador
Peña 88'	Report	Vite 85'

Estadio Universidad San Marcos, Lima
Referee: Juan Gabriel Benítez (Paraguay)
21 March 2019
19:30

Peru	0–0	Chile
	Report

Estadio Universidad San Marcos, Lima
Referee: Fernando Espinoza (Argentina)

23 March 2019
17:10

Ecuador	1–0	Bolivia
Mina 30'	Report

Estadio Universidad San Marcos, Lima
Referee: Carlos Herrera (Colombia)
23 March 2019
19:30

Peru	0–0	Venezuela
	Report

Estadio Universidad San Marcos, Lima
Referee: Rodolpho Toski (Brazil)

25 March 2019
17:10

Bolivia	3–5	Venezuela
Chura 45' (pen.); Robson Matheus 67' (pen.); Peña 80'	Report	De Santis 6', 20', 77'; Ruggieri 35'; Carmona 70'

Estadio Universidad San Marcos, Lima
Referee: Andrés Matonte (Uruguay)
25 March 2019
19:30

Ecuador	3–2	Chile
Mina 35', 66', 90+1'	Report	Aravena 6'; Tapia 16'

Estadio Universidad San Marcos, Lima
Referee: Derlis López (Paraguay)

27 March 2019
17:10

Chile	3–0	Venezuela
Flores 26'; Rojas 31'; Tapia 34'	Report

Estadio Universidad San Marcos, Lima
Referee: Fernando Espinoza (Argentina)
27 March 2019
19:30

Peru	3–1	Bolivia
Figueroa 41'; Celi 64' (pen.); Caipo 90'	Report	Chura 48'

Estadio Universidad San Marcos, Lima
Referee: Carlos Herrera (Colombia)

29 March 2019
17:10

Bolivia	0–4	Chile
	Report	González 17'; Tati 58'; Belmar 71'; Rojas 90+1'

Estadio Universidad San Marcos, Lima
Referee: Juan Gabriel Benítez (Paraguay)
29 March 2019
19:30

Peru	2–0	Ecuador
Pinto 10' (pen.); Figueroa 23'	Report

Estadio Universidad San Marcos, Lima
Referee: Rodolpho Toski (Brazil)

=== Group B ===
Pos	Team	Pld	W	D	L	GF	GA	GD	Pts	Qualification
1	Uruguay	4	2	1	1	8	5	+3	7	Final stage
2	Paraguay	4	2	1	1	8	7	+1	7	Final stage
3	Argentina	4	2	1	1	7	6	+1	7	Final stage
4	Brazil	4	2	1	1	7	8	−1	7	
5	Colombia	4	0	0	4	4	8	−4	0	

Source: CONMEBOL
22 March 2019
17:10

Uruguay	3–0	Argentina
Gutiérrez 2'; Olivera 5'; Ocampo 90'	Report

Estadio Universidad San Marcos, Lima
Referee: Cristian Garay (Chile)
22 March 2019
19:30

Brazil	3–2	Paraguay
Reinier 2', 37'; Peglow 84'	Report	López 52'; Noguera 61' (pen.)

Estadio Universidad San Marcos, Lima
Referee: Luis Quiroz (Ecuador)

24 March 2019
17:10

Argentina	2–1	Colombia
Fernández 45'; Zeballos 83'	Report	Campaña 88'

Estadio Universidad San Marcos, Lima
Referee: Kevin Ortega (Peru)
24 March 2019
19:30

Brazil	1–1	Uruguay
Gabriel Veron 67'	Report	Milans 84'

Estadio Universidad San Marcos, Lima
Referee: Ivo Méndez (Bolivia)

26 March 2019
17:10

Colombia	1–2	Uruguay
Arroyo 6' (pen.)	Report	Machado 15'; Cartagena 37'

Estadio Universidad San Marcos, Lima
Referee: Franklin Congo (Ecuador)
26 March 2019
19:30

Argentina	2–2	Paraguay
Palacios 12'; Amione 78'	Report	Peralta 18', 41'

Estadio Universidad San Marcos, Lima
Referee: Ángel Arteaga (Venezuela)

28 March 2019
17:10

Paraguay	3–2	Uruguay
D. Duarte 8'; Peralta 55'; López 81'	Report	Olivera 49'; Alaniz 90+3'

Estadio Universidad San Marcos, Lima
Referee: Cristian Garay (Chile)
28 March 2019
19:30

Brazil	3–2	Colombia
Patryck 44'; Reinier 59'; Henri 67'	Report	Y. Mosquera 53'; Cuesta 86'

Estadio Universidad San Marcos, Lima
Referee: Ángel Arteaga (Venezuela)

30 March 2019
17:10

Colombia	0–1	Paraguay
	Report	D. Duarte 63'

Estadio Universidad San Marcos, Lima
Referee: Ivo Méndez (Bolivia)
30 March 2019
19:30

Brazil	0–3	Argentina
	Report	Godoy 36' (pen.); Palacios 54'; Amione 90+2'

Estadio Universidad San Marcos, Lima
Referee: Luis Quiroz (Ecuador)

== Final stage ==
The schedule of the final matchday was modified based on which teams were possible to be champions.

Pos	Team	Pld	W	D	L	GF	GA	GD	Pts	Qualification
1	Argentina (C)	5	3	1	1	7	4	+3	10	2019 FIFA U-17 World Cup
2	Chile	5	3	1	1	8	6	+2	10	2019 FIFA U-17 World Cup
3	Paraguay	5	1	3	1	5	6	−1	6	2019 FIFA U-17 World Cup
4	Ecuador	5	1	2	2	7	8	−1	5	2019 FIFA U-17 World Cup
5	Peru (H)	5	1	2	2	6	8	−2	5	
6	Uruguay	5	1	1	3	10	11	−1	4	

Source: CONMEBOL
(C) Champions; (H) Hosts
2 April 2019
16:30

Chile	1–0	Ecuador
Aravena 80'	Report

Estadio Universidad San Marcos, Lima
Referee: Ivo Méndez (Bolivia)
2 April 2019
18:50

Uruguay	2–2	Paraguay
Gutiérrez 11'; Siri 22'	Report	Presentado 7'; O. Colmán 12'

Estadio Universidad San Marcos, Lima
Referee: Rodolpho Toski (Brazil)
2 April 2019
21:10

Peru	0–0	Argentina
	Report

Estadio Universidad San Marcos, Lima
Referee: Nicolás Gallo (Colombia)

5 April 2019
16:30

Paraguay	1–1	Ecuador
Ovelar 70'	Report	Plúas 43'

Estadio Universidad San Marcos, Lima
Referee: Carlos Herrera (Colombia)
5 April 2019
18:50

Uruguay	0–1	Argentina
	Report	Sforza 46'

Estadio Universidad San Marcos, Lima
Referee: Juan Soto (Venezuela)
5 April 2019
21:10

Peru	2–3	Chile
Celi 54'; Figueroa 56'	Report	Aravena 16' (pen.); Tapia 34'; Rojas 45'

Estadio Universidad San Marcos, Lima
Referee: Bráulio da Silva Machado (Brazil)

8 April 2019
16:30

Chile	0–2	Argentina
	Report	Godoy 1', 38' (pen.)

Estadio Universidad San Marcos, Lima
Referee: Juan Nelio García (Bolivia)
8 April 2019
18:50

Uruguay	4–1	Ecuador
Arezo 45+3', 48', 58'; P. Delgado 68' (o.g.)	Report	Vite 11'

Estadio Universidad San Marcos, Lima
Referee: Rodolpho Toski (Brazil)
8 April 2019
21:10

Peru	0–2	Paraguay
	Report	Presentado 8'; Ovelar 49'

Estadio Universidad San Marcos, Lima
Referee: Ángel Arteaga (Venezuela)

11 April 2019
16:30

Paraguay	0–3	Argentina
	Report	Krilanovich 22'; Medina 41' (pen.); Velasco 85'

Estadio Universidad San Marcos, Lima
Referee: Bráulio da Silva Machado (Brazil)
11 April 2019
18:50

Uruguay	2–4	Chile
Arezo 18'; Olivera 19'	Report	Rojas 60'; Osses 64', 90+3'; Aravena 88'

Estadio Universidad San Marcos, Lima
Referee: Juan Soto (Venezuela)
11 April 2019
21:10

Peru	1–1	Ecuador
Celi 50'	Report	Mercado 23'

Estadio Universidad San Marcos, Lima
Referee: Nicolás Gallo (Colombia)

14 April 2019
16:30

Peru	3–2	Uruguay
Pinto 42' (pen.), 48' (pen.); Llontop 90+3'	Report	Arezo 8'; Juambeltz 86'

Estadio Universidad San Marcos, Lima
Referee: Rodolpho Toski (Brazil)
14 April 2019
18:50

Chile	0–0	Paraguay
	Report

Estadio Universidad San Marcos, Lima
Referee: Carlos Herrera (Colombia)
14 April 2019
21:10

Ecuador	4–1	Argentina
Mina 59' (pen.), 65'; Mercado 64'; Mejía 76'	Report	Palacios 48'

Estadio Universidad San Marcos, Lima
Referee: Ángel Arteaga (Venezuela)

== Winners ==
2019 South American U-17 Football champions

Argentina
Fourth title

== Goalscorers ==
There were 106 goals scored in 35 matches, for an average of 3.03 goals per match.

6 goals

- (Ecuador) Johan Mina

5 goals

- (Uruguay) Matías Arezo

4 goals

- (Chile) Alexander Aravena
- (Chile) Luis Rojas

3 goals

- (Argentina) Matías Godoy
- (Argentina) Matías Palacios
- (Brazil) Reinier
- (Chile) Gonzalo Tapia
- (Paraguay) Fabrizio Peralta
- (Peru) Yuriel Celi
- (Peru) Nicolás Figueroa
- (Peru) Óscar Manuel Pinto
- (Uruguay) Cristian Olivera
- (Venezuela) Jeriel De Santis

2 goals

- (Argentina) Bruno Amione
- (Bolivia) Jeyson Chura
- (Chile) Benjamín Osses
- (Ecuador) John Mercado
- (Ecuador) Pedro Vite
- (Paraguay) Diego Duarte
- (Paraguay) Rodrigo López
- (Paraguay) Fernando Ovelar
- (Paraguay) Fernando Presentado
- (Uruguay) Juan Manuel Gutiérrez

1 goal

- (Argentina) Ezequiel Fernández
- (Argentina) Juan Pablo Krilanovich
- (Argentina) Cristian Medina
- (Argentina) Juan Sforza
- (Argentina) Alan Velasco
- (Argentina) Exequiel Zeballos
- (Bolivia) Adrián Peña
- (Bolivia) Robson Matheus
- (Brazil) Gabriel Veron
- (Brazil) Henri
- (Brazil) Patryck
- (Brazil) João Peglow
- (Chile) Matías Belmar
- (Chile) Patricio Flores
- (Chile) Daniel González
- (Chile) David Tati
- (Colombia) Andrés Arroyo
- (Colombia) Johan Campaña
- (Colombia) Juan Manuel Cuesta
- (Colombia) Yoni Mosquera
- (Ecuador) Adrián Mejía
- (Ecuador) Erick Plúas
- (Paraguay) Orlando Colmán
- (Paraguay) Junior Noguera
- (Peru) Rafael Caipo
- (Peru) Mathías Llontop
- (Uruguay) Kevin Alaniz
- (Uruguay) Santiago Cartagena
- (Uruguay) Maximiliano Juambeltz
- (Uruguay) Alexander Machado
- (Uruguay) Pedro Milans
- (Uruguay) Matías Ocampo
- (Uruguay) Enzo Siri
- (Venezuela) Wikelman Carmona
- (Venezuela) Luis Ángel Peña
- (Venezuela) Oswaldo Ruggieri

1 own goal

- (Ecuador) Patrickson Delgado (playing against Uruguay)

== Qualified teams for FIFA U-17 World Cup ==
The following five teams from CONMEBOL qualify for the 2019 FIFA U-17 World Cup, including Brazil who qualified automatically as host.

Team	Qualified on	Previous appearances in FIFA U-17 World Cup^{1}
Brazil	15 March 2019	16 (1985, 1987, 1989, 1991, 1995, **1997**, **1999**, 2001, **2003**, 2005, 2007, 2009, 2011, 2013, 2015, 2017)
Argentina	11 April 2019	13 (1985, 1989, 1991, 1993, 1995, 1997, 2001, 2003, 2007, 2009, 2011, 2013, 2015)
Chile	11 April 2019	4 (1993, 1997, 2015, 2017)
Paraguay	14 April 2019	4 (1999, 2001, 2015, 2017)
Ecuador	14 April 2019	4 (1987, 1995, 2011, 2015)

^{1} Bold indicates champions for that year. Italic indicates hosts for that year.
