= Fabrizio Peralta =

Paraguayan association football player (born 2002)

Personal information
- Full name: Fabrizio José Peralta Ramírez
- Date of birth: 2 August 2002 (age 24)
- Place of birth: Asunción, Paraguay
- Height: 1.76 m (5 ft 9 1/2 in)
- Position: Midfielder

Team information
- Current team: Cerro Porteño (on loan from Cruzeiro)
- Number: 16

Youth career
- Club Guaraní
- 2019–2023: Cerro Porteño
- 2021: → Flamengo (loan)

Senior career*
Years	Team	Apps	(Gls)
2023–2024	Cerro Porteno	30	(3)
2024–	Cruzeiro	10	(0)
2025	→ Athletico Paranaense (loan)	0	(0)
2025–	→ Cerro Porteño (loan)	24	(0)

International career^{‡}
2019	Paraguay U17	14	(3)
2023–	Paraguay U23	6	(1)
2024–	Paraguay	1	(0)
- * Club domestic league appearances and goals as of 26 May 2026 ‡ National team caps and goals as of 11 June 2024

Fabrizio José Peralta Ramírez (born 2 August 2002) is a Paraguayan footballer who plays as a midfielder for Cerro Porteño, on loan from Cruzeiro and the Paraguay national team.

== Early life ==
He grew up in Pinozá and was a youth player at Club Guaraní as a teenager before joining Cerro Porteño. He joined Brazilian side Flamengo on a fixed-term loan in 2021.

== Club career ==
He made his league debut for Cerro Porteño on 3 June 2023 against Club Libertad. In October 2023, he signed a three-year contract with the club.

He captained Cerro Porteño for the first time in February 2024 against Club Olimpia. He made his debut for Cerro Porteno in the Copa Libertadores on 4 April 2024 away against Colo Colo.

In June 2024, he transferred to Cruzeiro, from Brazil.

In February 2025, he transferred on loan to Athletico Paranaense.

== Style of play ==
He has been described as a winger, but has been praised by the Paraguay national team manager, Daniel Garnero, for his versatility across midfield.

== International career ==
He played for the Paraguayan U17 team in the 2019 South American U-17 Championship in where he was top scorer for Paraguay with three goals. He also played in the 2019 FIFA U-17 World Cup.

He played for the Paraguay national under-23 football team in the COMMENBAL Olympic qualifiers in 2024, scoring the only goal of a game in a 1–0 win against Brazil U23 in February 2024.

He was called up to the senior Paraguay squad in March 2024 but their friendly match against Russia at that time was cancelled due to the Crocus City Hall attack. He was called up again in May 2024 ahead of their friendly matches against Peru, Chile and Panama in June 2024.

Peralta made his debut on 11 June 2024 in a friendly against Chile at Estadio Nacional Julio Martínez Prádanos. He started the game and was substituted at half-time as Chile won 3–0.

== Personal life ==
He has the nickname el "Pitbull".

== Honours ==
Paraguay U23

- CONMEBOL Pre-Olympic Tournament: 2024
