= Rodrigo Lopez =

Rodrigo Lopez may refer to:

- Roderigo Lopes (c. 1517–1594), Portuguese physician to Queen Elizabeth I of England, who is said to have inspired Shakespeare's Shylock
- Rodrigo López (baseball) (born 1975), Major League Baseball starting pitcher
- Rodrigo López (footballer, born 1978)), Uruguayan football forward and football manager
- Rodrigo López (soccer, born 1987), American soccer midfielder
- Rodrigo López (footballer, born 2001), Mexican football midfielder
- Rodrigo López (footballer, born 2002), Paraguayan football midfielder

== See also ==
- López
