= Junior Noguera =

Paraguayan footballer (born 2002)

Personal information
- Full name: Junior Alexander Noguera Machuca
- Date of birth: 8 May 2002 (age 24)
- Place of birth: Caacupé, Paraguay
- Height: 1.77 m (5 ft 10 in)
- Position: Midfielder

Team information
- Current team: 2 de Mayo
- Number: 11

Youth career
- Cerro Porteño

Senior career*
Years	Team	Apps	(Gls)
2020–2023	Cerro Porteño	10	(0)
2024–	2 de Mayo	18	(3)

International career^{‡}
2019	Paraguay U17	11	(2)
2019	Paraguay U18	2	(0)
- * Club domestic league appearances and goals as of 17 September 2024 ‡ National team caps and goals as of 31 October 2019

Junior Alexander Noguera Machuca (born 8 May 2002) is a Paraguayan professional footballer who plays as a midfielder for Paraguayan Primera División side 2 de Mayo.

== Club career ==
Born in Caacupé, Noguera began his career with Cerro Porteño and made his professional debut with the club on 2 October 2020 against Sportivo San Lorenzo. He came on as a halftime substitute for Rodrigo Delvalle as Cerro Porteño drew the match 1–1.

== International career ==
Noguera represented Paraguay at the 2019 South American U-17 Championship and the 2019 FIFA U-17 World Cup.

== Career statistics ==
=== Club ===
As of match played 2 October 2020

Appearances and goals by club, season and competition
Club	Season	League			Cup		Other		Total	
Club	Season	Division	Apps	Goals	Apps	Goals	Apps	Goals	Apps	Goals
Cerro Porteño	2020	Paraguayan Primera División	1	0	0	0	0	0	1	0
Career total			1	0	0	0	0	0	1	0
