= Matías Belmar =

Chilean footballer (born 2002)

Personal information
- Full name: Matías Ismael Belmar Díaz
- Date of birth: 26 August 2002 (age 24)
- Place of birth: Rosario, Chile
- Height: 1.80 m (5 ft 11 in)
- Position: Forward

Team information
- Current team: Colchagua
- Number: 22

Youth career
- 2013–2021: O'Higgins

Senior career*
Years	Team	Apps	(Gls)
2021–2025	O'Higgins	35	(7)
2024	→ Deportes Santa Cruz (loan)	5	(1)
2025	→ Deportes Santa Cruz (loan)	2	(0)
2026–	Colchagua	0	(0)

International career
2019	Chile U17		
- * Club domestic league appearances and goals as of 17 February 2026

Matías Ismael Belmar Díaz (born 26 August 2002) is a Chilean footballer who plays as a forward for Colchagua.

== Career ==
Belmar was called up to the O'Higgins first team for the 2021 season and played his first match against Deportes Melipilla, replacing Santiago Romero. He scored four goals in the 2023 season, being one of the key players of the offensive. In 2024, before his loan to Deportes Temuco, he suffered an anterior cruciate ligament injury, cancelling the loan at the last moment. In the second half of the same year, he was loaned out to Deportes Santa Cruz. Back to O'Higgins in 2025, he returned to Deportes Santa Cruz on 31 July.

Ended his contract with O'Higgins, Belmar moved to Colchagua in the Segunda División Profesional de Chile.

== International career ==
Belmar represented Chile at under-17 level at the 2019 South American U-17 Championship, achieving second place and qualification for the 2019 FIFA U-17 World Cup. However, he was not considered in the squad of the tournament.
