= Orlando Colmán =

Paraguayan footballer (born 2002)

Personal information
- Full name: Orlando David Colmán
- Date of birth: 2 February 2002 (age 24)
- Position: Midfielder

Team information
- Current team: Club Nacional
- Number: 6

Senior career*
Years	Team	Apps	(Gls)
2019–	Club Nacional	5	(0)

International career^{‡}
2019–	Paraguay U17	4	(1)
- * Club domestic league appearances and goals as of 11:19, 17 June 2019 (UTC) ‡ National team caps and goals as of 11:19, 17 June 2019 (UTC)

Orlando David Colmán (born 2 February 2002) is a Paraguayan footballer who plays as a midfielder for Club Nacional.

== Career statistics ==
=== Club ===
As of 17 June 2019.

Club	Season	League			Cup		Continental		Other		Total	
Club	Season	Division	Apps	Goals	Apps	Goals	Apps	Goals	Apps	Goals	Apps	Goals
Club Nacional	2019	Paraguayan Primera División	5	0	0	0	0	0	0	0	5	0
Career total			5	0	0	0	0	0	0	0	5	0
