= Johan Mina =

Ecuadorian footballer (born 2002)

Personal information
- Full name: Johan Andreé Mina Mendoza
- Date of birth: 15 May 2002 (age 24)
- Place of birth: Guayaquil, Ecuador
- Height: 1.76 m (5 ft 9 in)
- Position: Midfielder

Team information
- Current team: Astillero

Youth career
- 2013–2020: Emelec
- 2020–2022: Werder Bremen
- 2021–2022: → Estoril Praia (loan)

Senior career*
Years	Team	Apps	(Gls)
2022–2024	Werder Bremen II	17	(3)
2022–2023	→ Emelec (loan)	0	(0)
2025	Maricá	2	(0)
2026	Astillero		(0)

International career
2019	Ecuador U17	12	(8)
2020	Ecuador U23	2	(0)
- * Club domestic league appearances and goals as of 10:02, 5 July 2026 (UTC)

Johan Andreé Mina Mendoza (born 15 May 2002) is an Ecuadorian footballer who plays as a midfielder for Astillero in the Segunda Categoría.

== Club career ==
Born in Guayaquil, Ecuador, Mina started his career with Emelec at the age of eleven. However, a contract dispute meant that he did not play football at all between 2018 and 2020. He was linked with Spanish and English giants Barcelona and Chelsea, but eventually he moved to Germany to sign for Werder Bremen. In October 2019, while still at Emelec, he was named by English newspaper The Guardian as one of the best players born in 2003 worldwide.

Mina was unable to settle at Werder Bremen, where he struggled to make friends or enjoy German cuisine, and also suffered with the effects of the COVID-19 pandemic in Germany, which meant he would most often train on his own, rather than with teammates. He was loaned to Portuguese side Estoril Praia in 2021, but again failed to settle, as Estoril deployed him at left-back for their under-23 side, a far cry from his natural false-nine position. Despite winning the under-23 league, Mina only totalled ten appearances in the whole season.

In July 2022, Mina returned to childhood club Emelec on a one-year loan from Werder Bremen. However, he again struggled for game time, and it was rumoured that the loan would be cut short in November 2022. Despite remaining contracted to Emelec, he failed to impress new manager Miguel Rondelli, and would eventually begin training with Ecuadorian Serie B club Rocafuerte in order to stay fit. In May 2023 he stated in an interview with Diario Expreso that he regretted moving to Germany, and that Werder Bremen had informed him that he would be loaned out the following season.

Mina returned to Germany the following year, making appearances for Werder Bremen's reserve team in the Bremen-Liga, but after one season he terminated his contract with the club prematurely. After half a year as a free agent, he signed with Brazilian Série D club Maricá ahead of the 2025 season. In March 2026, after his release from Maricá, Mina returned to Ecuador, joining Segunda Categoría side Astillero as a free agent.

== International career ==
Mina has represented Ecuador at under-17 and under-23 level.

== Personal life ==
Johan's father, Joaquin, also represented Emelec in the 1990s.

== Career statistics ==
=== Club ===
As of 11 June 2025

Appearances and goals by club, season and competition
Club	Season	League			Cup		Other		Total	
Club	Season	Division	Apps	Goals	Apps	Goals	Apps	Goals	Apps	Goals
Emelec (loan)	2022	Ecuadorian Serie A	0	0	0	0	0	0	0	0
Emelec (loan)	2023	Ecuadorian Serie A	0	0	0	0	0	0	0	0
Emelec (loan)	Total		0	0	0	0	0	0	0	0
Werder Bremen II	2023–24	Bremen-Liga	17	3	0	0	0	0	17	3
Maricá	2025	Série D	2	0	0	0	1 (Note: Appearances in the Copa Rio)	0	3	0
Career total			19	3	0	0	1	0	20	3
