= John Mercado =

Ecuadorian footballer (born 2002)

Personal information
- Full name: John Anthony Mercado Cuero
- Date of birth: 3 June 2002 (age 24)
- Place of birth: Guayaquil, Ecuador
- Height: 1.86 m (6 ft 1 in)
- Position: Winger

Team information
- Current team: Sparta Prague
- Number: 17

Youth career
- Clan Juvenil
- 2016–2019: Panamá
- 2020–2022: Athletico Paranaense

Senior career*
Years	Team	Apps	(Gls)
2022	Athletico Paranaense	1	(0)
2022	→ CSA (loan)	9	(0)
2023	Vilafranquense	13	(2)
2023–2025	AVS	61	(7)
2025–	Sparta Prague	38	(12)

International career^{‡}
2017	Ecuador U15		
2019	Ecuador U17	13	(3)
2020	Ecuador U20	2	(0)
2024–	Ecuador	12	(1)
- * Club domestic league appearances and goals as of 09 November 2026 ‡ National team caps and goals as of 17 November 2026

John Anthony Mercado Cuero (born 3 June 2002) is an Ecuadorian professional footballer who plays as a winger for Czech First League club Sparta Prague and the Ecuador national team.

== Club career ==
Born in Guayaquil, Mercado agreed to a contract with Athletico Paranaense in July 2019, but only moved to his new side in August 2020, after his 18th birthday. After playing for the under-20s, he impressed manager Alberto Valentim in 2022, and was promoted to the first team squad.

Mercado made his professional debut on 2 March 2022, coming on as a second-half substitute for Léo Cittadini in a 0–2 away loss against Palmeiras, for the year's Recopa Sudamericana. In July, Athletico sent him on loan to Série B club CSA until the end of the season.

In January 2023, Mercado terminated his contract with Athletico Paranaense and moved to Portugal, joining Liga Portugal 2 side Vilafranquense. At the end of the 2022–23 season, Vilafranquense relocated to Vila das Aves and was rebranded as AVS Futebol SAD. On 18 December 2023, he extended his contract with AVS until 2027.

On 10 August 2025, Mercado signed a contract with Czech First League club Sparta Prague.

== International career ==
Mercado represented Ecuador at under-15 level in the 2017 South American U-15 Championship, and at under-17 level in the 2019 South American U-17 Championship and the 2019 FIFA U-17 World Cup.

Mercado debuted for the senior Ecuador national team on 6 September 2024 in a World Cup qualifier against Brazil at the Estádio Couto Pereira. He substituted Kevin Rodríguez in the 68th minute, Brazil won 1–0.

== Career statistics ==
=== Club ===
As of 20 September 2026

Club	Season	League			State League		Cup		League cup		Continental		Other		Total	
Club	Season	Division	Apps	Goals	Apps	Goals	Apps	Goals	Apps	Goals	Apps	Goals	Apps	Goals	Apps	Goals
Athletico Paranaense	2022	Série A	1	0	0	0	0	0	—		0	0	1 (Note: Appearance(s) in Recopa Sudamericana)	0	2	0
CSA (loan)	2022	Série B	9	0	—		—		—		—		—		9	0
Vilafranquense	2022–23	Liga Portugal 2	13	2	—		0	0	—		—		—		13	2
AVS	2023–24	Liga Portugal 2	28	4	—		1	0	3	1	—		2 (Note: Appearance(s) in Liga Portugal 2 Playoffs)	1	34	6
AVS	2024–25	Primeira Liga	33	3	—		1	1	—		—		2 (Note: Appearance(s) in Primeira Liga Playoffs)	0	36	4
AVS	Total		61	7	—		2	1	3	1	—		4	1	70	10
Sparta Prague	2025–26	Czech First League	26	7	—		2	1	—		9 (Note: Appearance(s) in UEFA Conference League)	1	—		37	9
Sparta Prague	2026–27	Czech First League	9	4	—		0	0	—		3 (Note: Two appearances and one goal in UEFA Champions League, one appearance and one goal in UEFA Europa League)	2	—		12	6
Sparta Prague	Total		35	11	—		2	1	—		12	3	—		49	15
Career total			119	20	0	0	4	2	3	1	12	3	5	1	145	27

=== International ===
As of match played 17 November 2026

Appearances and goals by national team and year
National team	Year	Apps	Goals
Ecuador	2024	3	0
Ecuador	2025	3	0
Ecuador	2026	6	1
Total		12	1

List of international goals scored by John Mercado
No.	Date	Venue	Opponent	Score	Result	Competition
1	17 November 2026	Estadio Monumental Banco Pichincha, Guayaquil, Ecuador	Bolivia	1–0	2–0	Friendly
