= Unplugged Tour =

2012 concert tour by Juanes

- Tour by Juanes
- Promotional poster for 2012 tour
- Associated album: Juanes MTV Unplugged
- Start date: September 2, 2012
- End date: 2013
- Legs: 3
- No. of shows: 18 in South America; 9 in North America; 14 in Europe; 40 Total

Juanes concert chronology
- P.A.R.C.E. Tour (2011); Juanes Unplugged Tour (2012); Loud & Unplugged Tour (2013)

Unplugged Tour was a concert tour by Colombian singer-songwriter Juanes.

== Commercial performance ==
In Perú, more than 20,000 people attended to his concert in Lima. During his show in Cusco more than 40,000 people attended to the concert making it the biggest crowd ever in that city for a concert. In Colombia, tickets sold-out for both shows in Medellín and the show in Bogotá. Later, tickets for shows in Bucaramanga, Cali and Barranquilla also sold out.

== Tour dates ==
Date	City	Country	Venue
North America
August 29, 2012	Mérida	Mexico	Yucatán Siglo XXI Convention Centre
August 31, 2012	Boca del Río	Mexico	World Trade Center Veracruz
September 2, 2012	Zapopan	Mexico	Telmex Auditorium
September 4, 2012	Querétaro	Mexico	Auditoria Josefa Ortiz
September 6, 2012	León	Mexico	Explanada De La Feria
September 7, 2012	Zacatecas	Mexico	Teatro del Pueblo
September 8, 2012	Puebla	Mexico	Auditorio Siglo XXI
September 9, 2012	Mexico City	Mexico	Pepsi Center WTC
South America
September 12, 2012	Lima	Peru	Estadio Universidad San Marcos
September 14, 2012	Cusco	Peru	Jardin de la Cerveza
September 15, 2012	Arequipa	Peru	Jardin de la Cerveza
September 27, 2012	Montevideo	Uruguay	Velodromo Nacional de Montevideo
September 29, 2012	Córdoba	Argentina	Orfeo Superdomo
September 30, 2012	Rosario	Argentina	Metropolitano
October 2, 2012	Buenos Aires	Argentina	Luna Park
October 3, 2012	Santa Fe	Argentina	Estadio Cubierto Club Unión
October 6, 2012	Buenos Aires	Argentina	Luna Park
Europe
October 17, 2012	Madrid	Spain	La Riviera
October 18, 2012	Barcelona	Spain	Palau de la Música Catalana
October 19, 2012	Valencia	Spain	Auditorio
October 21, 2012	San Sebastián	Spain	Kuursaal
October 23, 2012	Málaga	Spain	Palacio de Ferias y Congresos
October 25, 2012	Cologne	Germany	Live Music Hall
October 26, 2012	Amsterdam	Netherlands	Paradiso
October 27, 2012	Paris	France	Trianon
October 29, 2012	Brussels	Belgium	Cirque Royal
October 30, 2012	Luxembourg	Luxembourg	Den Atelier
November 2, 2012	Hamburg	Germany	The Docks
November 3, 2012	Berlin	Germany	Huxleys
November 5, 2012	London	England	Shepherd's Bush Empire
November 7, 2012	Vilnius	Lithuania	Simens Arena
North America
November 24, 2012	New York City	United States	Barclays Center
South America
November 27, 2012	Bogotá	Colombia	Coliseo Cubierto el Campín
November 30, 2012	Villavicencio	Colombia	Coliseo Alvaro Mesa Amaya
December 5, 2012	Bucaramanga	Colombia	Coliseo Bicentenario Alvaro Galvis
December 7, 2012	Cali	Colombia	Centro de Eventos Valle del Pacifico
December 8, 2012	Pereira	Colombia	Expo Futuro
December 11, 2012	Cartagena	Colombia	Centro de Convenciones
December 12, 2012	Barranquilla	Colombia	Coliseo Universidad del Norte
December 15, 2012	Medellín	Colombia	Orquideaorama
December 16, 2012	Medellín	Colombia	Orquideaorama
