= David Tati =

Chilean footballer

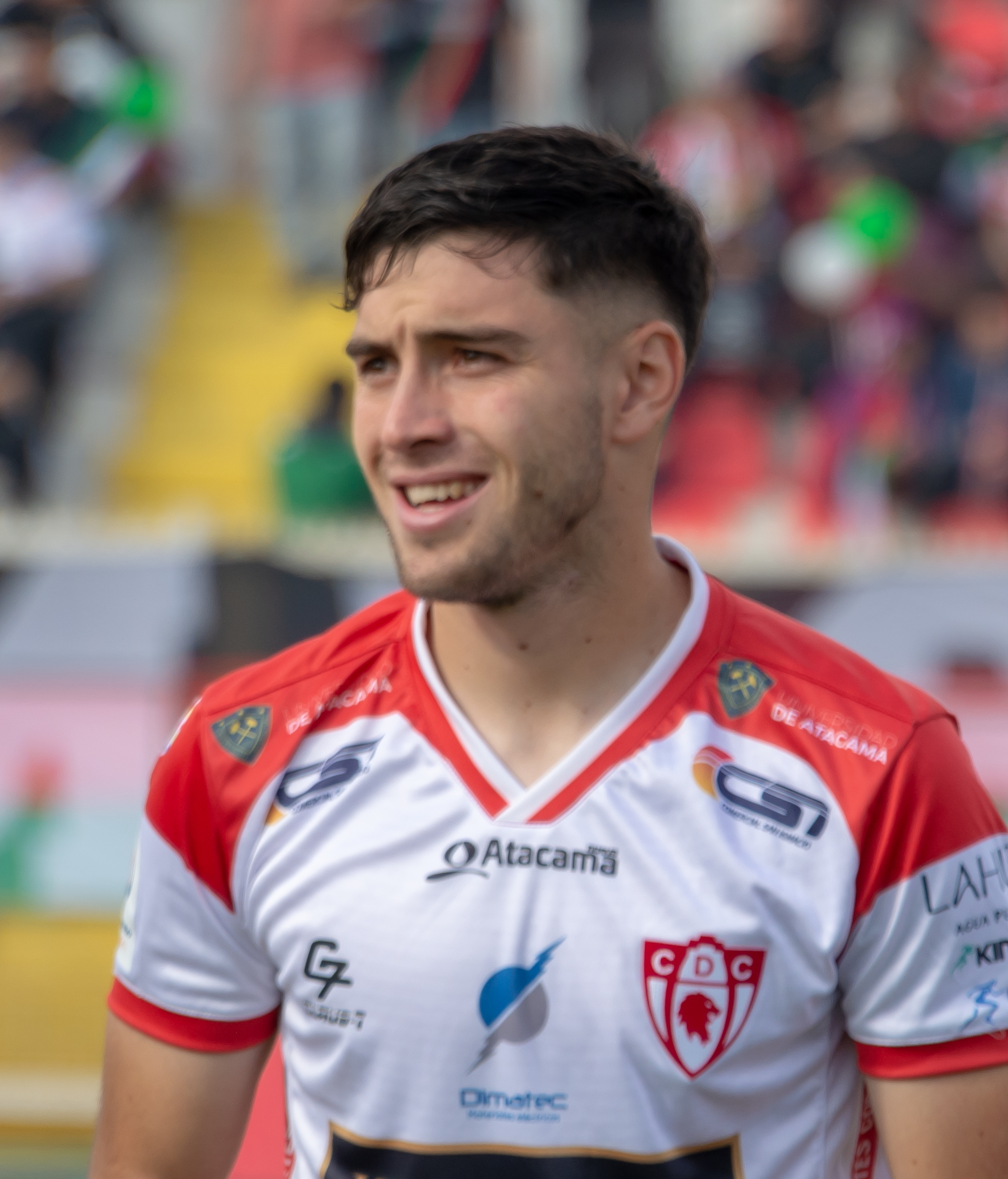
- Tati with Deportes Copiapó in 2023.

Personal information
- Full name: David Octavio Tati Díaz
- Date of birth: 6 June 2002 (age 24)
- Place of birth: Puente Alto, Santiago, Chile
- Height: 1.74 m (5 ft 9 in)
- Position: Right-back

Team information
- Current team: Deportes Santa Cruz

Youth career
- Colo-Colo

Senior career*
Years	Team	Apps	(Gls)
2019–2024	Colo-Colo	0	(0)
2021	→ Universidad de Concepción (loan)	18	(0)
2022	→ Deportes Temuco (loan)	22	(0)
2023	→ Deportes Copiapó (loan)	11	(0)
2025	Deportes Linares	21	(0)
2026–	Deportes Santa Cruz	0	(0)

International career
2019	Chile U17	11	(3)
- * Club domestic league appearances and goals as of 6 January 2026

David Octavio Tati Díaz (born 6 June 2002) is a Chilean footballer who plays as a right-back for Deportes Santa Cruz.

== Club career ==
Born in Puente Alto commune, Santiago de Chile, Tati is a product of Chilean giant Colo-Colo. He signed his first professional contract in 2019 and was loaned out to Universidad de Concepción and Deportes Temuco in 2021 and 2022, respectively.

In 2023, Tati was loaned out to Deportes Copiapó in the Chilean Primera División. Back to Colo-Colo for the 2024 season, his contract ended in November of the same year.

In 2025, Tati moved to Deportes Linares. The next year, he switched to Deportes Santa Cruz.

== International career ==
Tati represented Chile U17 at both the 2019 South American Championship and the 2019 FIFA World Cup.
