= Benjamín Osses =

Chilean footballer

Personal information
- Full name: Benjamín Rodrigo Osses Miranda
- Date of birth: 24 June 2002 (age 24)
- Place of birth: Lo Espejo, Santiago, Chile
- Height: 1.72 m (5 ft 8 in)
- Position: Winger

Team information
- Current team: Brujas de Salamanca

Youth career
- Cobresal

Senior career*
Years	Team	Apps	(Gls)
2022–2025	Cobresal	21	(1)
2025	→ Deportes Copiapó (loan)	10	(1)
2026–	Brujas de Salamanca	0	(0)

International career
2019	Chile U17	7	(2)
- * Club domestic league appearances and goals as of 21 February 2026

Benjamín Rodrigo Osses Miranda (born 24 June 2002) is a Chilean footballer who plays as a winger for Brujas de Salamanca.

== Club career ==
A product of Cobresal, Osses made his professional debut in the 2020 Chilean Primera División. The next year, he scored his first goal in the 2–0 win against Curicó Unido on 2 May. In 2025, he was loaned out to Deportes Copiapó.

On 19 February 2026, Osses signed with Brujas de Salamanca.

== International career ==
Osses represented Chile at under-17 level in the 2019 South American Championship under Hernán Caputto. At the tournament, he scored two goals in the 2–4 win against Uruguay and Chile qualified to the 2019 FIFA World Cup.
