= Kevin Alaníz =

Uruguayan footballer (born 2003)

Personal information
- Full name: Kevin Nicolás Alaníz Acuña
- Date of birth: 30 January 2003 (age 23)
- Place of birth: Montevideo, Uruguay
- Height: 1.72 m (5 ft 8 in)
- Position: Midfielder

Team information
- Current team: Rampla Juniors

Youth career
- Fénix

Senior career*
Years	Team	Apps	(Gls)
2019–2023	Fénix	49	(0)
2024–2025	Uruguay Montevideo	16	(5)
2025–2026	Central Español	11	(0)
2026–	Rampla Juniors	0	(0)

International career
2018–2019	Uruguay U17	15	(1)
- * Club domestic league appearances and goals as of 14 March 2026

Kevin Nicolás Alaníz Acuña (born 30 January 2003) is a Uruguayan professional footballer who plays as a midfielder for Uruguayan Primera División Amateur club Rampla Juniors.

== Club career ==
A youth academy graduate of Fénix, Alaníz made his professional debut on 11 May 2019 in a 3–0 loss against Progreso.

== International career ==
Alaníz is a current Uruguay youth international. He was part of Uruguay squad at the 2019 South American U-17 Championship. He played three matches in the tournament and scored a goal.

== Career statistics ==
As of 28 October 2022

Appearances and goals by club, season and competition
Club	Season	League			Cup		Continental		Total	
Club	Season	Division	Apps	Goals	Apps	Goals	Apps	Goals	Apps	Goals
Fénix	2019	Uruguayan Primera División	12	0	—		—		12	0
Fénix	2020	Uruguayan Primera División	23	0	—		3 (Note: Appearances in Copa Sudamericana)	0	26	0
Fénix	2021	Uruguayan Primera División	13	0	—		0	0	13	0
Fénix	2022	Uruguayan Primera División	0	0	0	0	—		0	0
Career total			48	0	0	0	3	0	51	0
