= Gerónimo Ovelar =

Paraguayan footballer (born 1951)

Personal information
- Full name: Gerónimo Ovelar Basualdo
- Date of birth: 30 September 1951 (age 75)
- Place of birth: Lambaré, Paraguay
- Position: Central defender

Senior career*
| Years | Team | Apps | (Gls) |
| 1969–1981 | Cerro Porteño | | |
| 1981–1985 | Guaraní | | |
| 1985–1987 | Atlético Colegiales | | |

International career
| 1979 | Paraguay | 3 | (0) |
Medal record
Representing Paraguay
| Winner | Copa América | 1979 |
- * Club domestic league appearances and goals

Gerónimo Ovelar (born 30 September 1951) is a Paraguayan former professional footballer who played for Paraguay, as a central defender.

== Club career ==
Born in Lambaré, Paraguay, Ovelar began his career at Cerro Porteño, before joining Guaraní.

== International career ==
Ovelar made three appearances for Paraguay in 1979, being part of the squad that lifted the 1979 Copa América.

== Personal life ==
Ovelar's grandson is current Cerro Porteño forward Fernando Ovelar.
