= Rodrigo López (footballer, born 2002) =

Paraguayan footballer

Personal information
- Full name: Rodrigo Jesús López
- Date of birth: 29 March 2002 (age 24)
- Place of birth: Santa Rita, Paraguay
- Height: 1.74 m (5 ft 9 in)
- Position: Midfielder

Team information
- Current team: Athens Kallithea
- Number: 10

Senior career*
Years	Team	Apps	(Gls)
2018–2023	Club Libertad	1	(0)
2021–2022	→ Sportivo Ameliano (loan)		
2022	→ Atyrá (loan)		
2023	→ Guaireña (loan)		
2023	Deportivo Santaní	0	(0)
2024	Racing	6	(0)
2024–2026	Tembetary	13	(2)
2025	→ San Antonio Bulo Bulo (loan)	12	(2)
2026	Chania	10	(0)
2026–	Athens Kallithea	3	(0)

International career^{‡}
2019	Paraguay U17	13	(2)
- * Club domestic league appearances and goals as of 20 September 2026 ‡ National team caps and goals as of 21:00, 10 November 2019 (UTC)

Rodrigo Jesús López (born 29 March 2002) is a Paraguayan footballer who plays as a midfielder for Super League Greece 2 club Athens Kallithea.

== Career statistics ==
=== Club ===
As of 17 June 2019.

Club	Season	League			Cup		Continental		Other		Total	
Club	Season	Division	Apps	Goals	Apps	Goals	Apps	Goals	Apps	Goals	Apps	Goals
Club Libertad	2018	Paraguayan Primera División	1	0	0	0	0	0	0	0	1	0
Club Libertad	2019	Paraguayan Primera División	0	0	0	0	0	0	0	0	0	0
Career total			1	0	0	0	0	0	0	0	1	0
