= Fernando Ovelar =

Paraguayan footballer (born 2004)

Personal information
- Full name: Fernando Fabián Ovelar Martínez
- Date of birth: 6 January 2004 (age 22)
- Place of birth: Asunción, Paraguay
- Height: 1.73 m (5 ft 8 in)
- Position: Winger

Team information
- Current team: Ñublense (on loan from Pachuca)

Youth career
- Cerro Porteño

Senior career*
Years	Team	Apps	(Gls)
2018–2022	Cerro Porteño	32	(2)
2023–	Pachuca	2	(0)
2023	→ Atlante (loan)	19	(0)
2024–2025	→ Unión Española (loan)	42	(4)
2026–	→ Ñublense (loan)	0	(0)

International career^{‡}
2018–2019	Paraguay U17	6	(2)
- * Club domestic league appearances and goals as of 22 January 2026 ‡ National team caps and goals as of 27 April 2019

Fernando Fabián Ovelar Martínez (born 6 January 2004) is a Paraguayan professional footballer who plays as a forward for Chilean club Ñublense on loan from Liga MX club Pachuca. He is the youngest ever player to score in the Paraguayan Primera División, when he netted at only 14 years old.

== Club career ==
Ovelar made his professional debut for Cerro Porteño in a 1–1 Paraguayan Primera División tie with 3 de Febrero on 28 October 2018. Ovelar scored his first professional goal the following week in the Paraguayan Superclásico against Club Olimpia on 4 November 2018. Ovelar is the youngest player to ever play in the Paraguayan Primera División, and also the youngest ever scorer in the league, at the age of 14 years, 9 months and 27 days.

In 2024, Ovelar joined Chilean Primera División side Unión Española on loan from Pachuca. He left them at the end of the 2025 season. In January 2026, he was loaned out to Ñublense in the same division.

== International career ==
On 12 December 2018, Ovelar made his debut for Paraguay U17, scoring in a 1–0 victory against Mexico U17.

== Personal life ==
Ovelar's grandfather, Gerónimo Ovelar, was also a professional footballer who played for Cerro Porteño and the Paraguay national football team in the 1970s and 1980s.

== See also ==
- Players and Records in Paraguayan Football

== Honours ==
Paraguay U20

- South American Games: 2022
