= Estadio Universidad San Marcos =

Multi-use stadium in Lima, Peru

Coordinates: 12.057°S 77.075°W

Estadio de la UNMSM
- Colosseum of the Americas
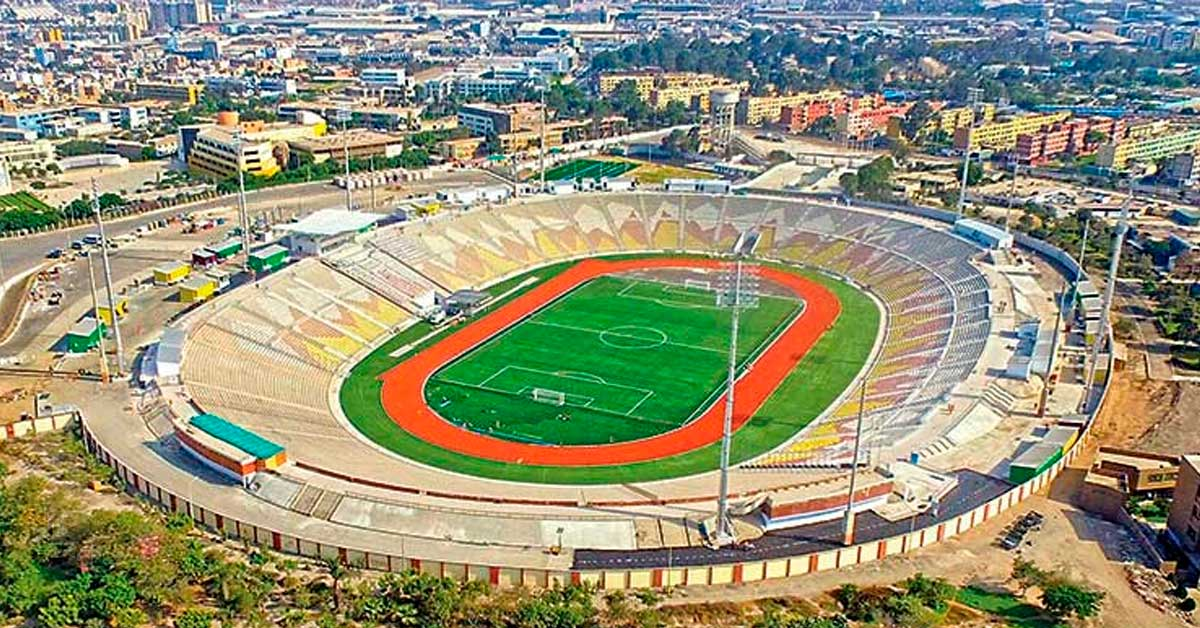
- Interactive map of Estadio de la UNMSM
- Full name: Estadio de la Universidad Nacional Mayor San Marcos
- Location: Lima, Peru
- Owner: Universidad San Marcos
- Operator: Universidad San Marcos
- Capacity: 32,000
- Surface: Grass

Construction
- Built: 1951
- Opened: May 13, 1951

The Estadio de la UNMSM is a multi-purpose stadium located in Lima, Peru, belonging to the National University of San Marcos. It was inaugurated on May 13, 1951, with a seating capacity of 32,000 and covers an area of 48,782 m^{2}. Safety measures have been taken and they have reduced the maximum to 32,000 for the safety of the public. The stadium is used by several Peruvian teams who do not have a home ground. It has a running track and is near an archaeological excavation site known as Huaca San Marcos, which is also located in the center of the University City of the National University of San Marcos. In 2019, it was the main stadium for the football matches of the 2019 South American U-17 Championship and the 2019 Pan American Games.

Today is an alternate stadium of the football team Club Universitario de Deportes, which plays in the First Division of Peru. Previously, it was the official stadium of the football team of the university, the Club Deportivo Universidad San Marcos, which played in the Second Division of Peru. Besides the stadium is used for extracurricular activities for students, teachers and administrators at the University of San Marcos

== History ==
The stadium of the University of San Marcos began to be built around 1943 as part of the work of the then "Pro-Unemployed Board". The western platform was placed on the Huaca Concha, the northernmost of the Complex Maranga. The other stands were built with extra padding it. The esplanade match the old sports archaeological plaza located east of Huaca. Officially opened on 13 May 1951, commemorating the 400th anniversary of founding of the Universidad Nacional Mayor de San Marcos; the opening generated great expectations as the first large-capacity stadium in Peru, which was attended by then-President Manuel Odria, his education minister and the chancellor of the university. The opening match was between the Sport Boys of Callao and Palmeiras of Brazil.

For its construction on archaeological stuffed unstable over the years, cracks appeared in the stands and large slumps. In 1993 the government of Alberto Fujimori earmarked money for the renovation of the stadium. When machines raised the floor of the esplanade of the western grandstand, which was hardest hit, were exposed bale walls and archaeological 1,500 years old. Despite this, he set the fence and custody of the place, and built new footings on the archaeological architecture.

== Sport events ==
The Stadium is also used for other kind of activities such as:

- Special Olympics (1951)
- National College Sports (1955)
- Sports National University (1983)
- 2019 South American U-17 Championship
- 2019 Pan American Games

== Concerts ==
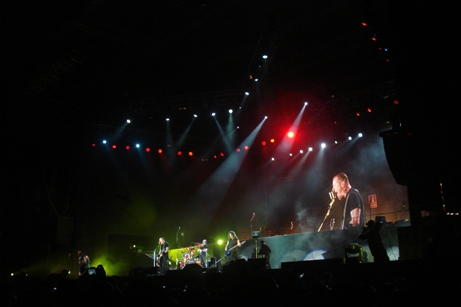
Metallica (World Magnetic Tour) at the stadium.

- Van Halen - February 18, 1983 - Hide Your Sheep Tour
- Metallica - January 19, 2010 - World Magnetic Tour
- Korn - April 15, 2010
- Gustavo Cerati - April 24, 2010
- Bon Jovi - September 29, 2010
- Green Day - October 26, 2010
- The Smashing Pumpkins and Stereophonics - November 25, 2010
- Issac Delgado and Manolin - December 10, 2010
- Iron Maiden - March 23, 2011
- Shakira - The Sun Comes Out World Tour - March 25, 2011 (with Ziggy Marley and Train)
- Slayer - June 11, 2011
- Bad Religion - October 7, 2011
- Aerosmith - October 22, 2011
- Pearl Jam - November 18, 2011
- Noel Gallagher's High Flying Birds - May 11, 2012
- Juanes - Juanes MTV Unplugged Tour September 12, 2012
- Evanescence - October 25, 2012
- Lady Gaga - Born This Way Ball Tour - November 23, 2012
- Blur - October 29, 2013.
- Nightwish - Endless Forms Most Beautiful World Tour - October 6, 2015
- Festival VIVO X EL ROCK 6 - Sum 41, Collective Soul, Hoobastank, Puddle of Mudd, Sepultura, The Casualties - December 12, 2015
- Festival VIVO X EL ROCK 8 - Sum 41, Garbage, Hoobastank, The Cranberries, Los Fabulosos Cadillacs, Fito Páez, Papa Roach, Miguel Mateos, Aterciopelados - December 17, 2016
- Green Day - Revolution Radio Tour - November 14, 2017
- Festival VIVO X EL ROCK 11 - The Strokes, Slipknot, Interpol, Bullet for my Valentine, The Rasmus, Fito Páez, Don Diablo, Mago de Öz, El Cuarteto de Nos - November 23, 2019
- Guns N' Roses - Guns N' Roses 2020 Tour - October 8, 2022
- Super Junior - Super Show 9: Road - February 11, 2023
- Mötley Crüe and Def Leppard – The World Tour – February 28, 2023
- Paramore - This is Why Tour - March 2, 2023
- Grupo 5 - 50 Anniversary - March 31, April 1 & 2, 2023
- Ultra Perú 2023 - Marshmello, Alan Walker, Oliver Heldens, Timmy Trumpet - April 22, 2023
- The Weeknd - After Hours til Dawn Tour - October 22, 2023
- The Cure - Shows of a Lost World Tour - November 22, 2023
- blink-182 - World Tour 2023/2024 - March 12, 2024
- Karol G - Mañana Será Bonito Tour - April 12 & 13, 2024
- Ultra Perú 2024 - Adam Beyer, Armin van Buuren, Camelphat, Hardwell, KSHMR - April 20 & 21, 2024
- Nubeluz - La despedida - July 20, 2024
- Stray Kids - Dominate World Tour - April 9, 2025
- Green Day - The Saviors Tour - August 27, 2025
- Super Junior - Super Show 10 - October 16, 2025
- Imagine Dragons - Loom World Tour - October 19, 2025
- Linkin Park - From Zero World Tour - October 28, 2025
- Dua Lipa - Radical Optimism Tour - November 25, 2025
- Enhypen - Blood Saga Tour - July 8, 2026
- BTS - Arirang World Tour - October 7, 9 & 10, 2026
- Maná - Vivir Sin Aire Tour - December 2, 2026
- Robbie Williams - Britpop Tour - December 12, 2026
- Karol G - Viajando Por El Mundo Tropitour - January 22, 2027
- Foo Fighters - Take Cover Tour - March 3, 2027
