= Johan Campaña =

Colombian footballer (born 2002)

Personal information
- Full name: Johan Camilo Campaña Barrera
- Date of birth: 9 September 2002 (age 24)
- Place of birth: Pasto, Colombia
- Height: 1.70 m (5 ft 7 in)
- Position: Forward

Team information
- Current team: Deportivo Pasto
- Number: 10

Youth career
- Deportivo Pasto

Senior career*
Years	Team	Apps	(Gls)
2019–	Deportivo Pasto	51	(2)
2021–2022	→ Argentinos Juniors (loan)	0	(0)

International career
2019	Colombia U17	4	(1)
- * Club domestic league appearances and goals as of 14 August 2025

Johan Camilo Campaña Barrera (born 9 September 2002) is a Colombian footballer who currently plays as a forward for Deportivo Pasto.

== Career statistics ==
=== Club ===
As of 19 February 2023.

Club	Division	Season	League		Cup		Total	
Club	Division	Season	Apps	Goals	Apps	Goals	Apps	Goals
Deportivo Pasto	Categoría Primera A	2019	0	0	4 (Note: Appearances in the Copa Colombia)	0	4	0
Deportivo Pasto	Categoría Primera A	2020	2	0	1	0	3	0
Deportivo Pasto	Categoría Primera A	2021	0	0	0	0	0	0
Deportivo Pasto	Categoría Primera A	2023	3	1	0	0	3	1
Career total			5	1	5	0	10	1
