= Nicolás Gallo (referee) =

Colombian football referee

- Full name: Nicolás Gallo Barragán
- Born: 9 August 1986 (age 40); Ibagué, Tolima, Colombia

Domestic
Years	League	Role
2011–	Categoría Primera A	Referee
2018–	FIFA	Referee

International
Years	League	Role
2018–	FIFA	Referee

Nicolás Gallo Barragán (August 9, 1986) is a Colombian football referee who has been a FIFA international referee since 2018.

== Biography ==
Born in Ibagué, he made his debut in Colombia during the 2011 Liga DIMAYOR Clausura Tournament.

In 2021, he was part of the officiating team at the 2020 Summer Olympic, held in Tokyo, Japan, and postponed by one year due to the COVID-19 pandemic.

As the video assistant referee (VAR) official in 2021, during a 2022 FIFA World Cup qualifying match between Paraguay and Uruguay, which was tied 0–0, the video referee upheld the incorrect disallowance of a goal by Uruguay’s Jonathan Rodríguez in the first half.

Roldán was the assistant referee who flagged the offside on Jonathan Rodríguez’s goal attempt, and Gallo reviewed the video and confirmed the on-field decision. Due to the error, CONMEBOL suspended the Colombian referees.

He was the only Colombian referee at the 2022 FIFA World Cup in Qatar, having been selected to join the VAR team. For the 2026 FIFA World Cup, to be held in the United States, Mexico, and Canada, he was once again selected to be part of the VAR team as a representative of CONMEBOL. In addition to Nicolás, two other Colombian referees were selected: Andrés Rojas as the head referee and Alexander Guzmán as an assistant referee.
