= Jeyson Chura =

Bolivian footballer (born 2002)

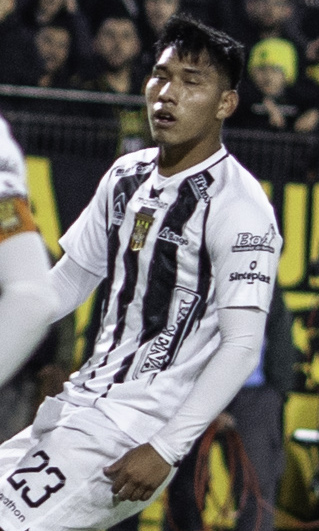

Personal information
- Full name: Jeyson Ariel Chura Almanza
- Date of birth: 3 February 2002 (age 24)
- Height: 1.73 m (5 ft 8 in)
- Positions: Second striker; midfielder

Team information
- Current team: Blooming (on loan from Panetolikos)
- Number: 23

Youth career
- –2019: Club Florida

Senior career*
| Years | Team | Apps | (Gls) |
| 2020–2025 | The Strongest | 118 | (28) |
| 2025– | Panetolikos | 5 | (0) |
| 2026– | → Blooming (loan) | 0 | (0) |

International career^{‡}
| 2019 | Bolivia U17 | 4 | (2) |
| 2021– | Bolivia | 10 | (0) |
- * Club domestic league appearances and goals as of 01:11, 10 March 2026 (UTC) ‡ National team caps and goals as of 22:56, 10 October 2024 (UTC)

Jeyson Ariel Chura Almanza (born 3 February 2002) is a Bolivian professional footballer who plays as a midfielder for Blooming on loan from Greek Super League club Panetolikos.

== International career ==
He was selected for Bolivia squad for the 2021 Copa América and made his debut on 18 June 2021 in a game against Chile.

== Career statistics ==
=== Club ===
As of 5 July 2025.

| Club | Season | League | | | Cup | | Continental | | Other | | Total | |
| Club | Season | Division | Apps | Goals | Apps | Goals | Apps | Goals | Apps | Goals | Apps | Goals |
|---|---|---|---|---|---|---|---|---|---|---|---|---|
| The Strongest | 2020 | Bolivian Primera División | 10 | 3 | 0 | 0 | 0 | 0 | 0 | 0 | 10 | 3 |
| The Strongest | 2021 | Bolivian Primera División | 20 | 4 | 0 | 0 | 3 (Note: Appearances in the Copa Libertadores) | 0 | 0 | 0 | 23 | 4 |
| The Strongest | 2022 | Bolivian Primera División | 23 | 5 | 0 | 0 | 1 | 0 | 0 | 0 | 24 | 5 |
| The Strongest | 2023 | Bolivian Primera División | 23 | 4 | 6 | 0 | 4 | 0 | 0 | 0 | 33 | 4 |
| The Strongest | 2024 | Bolivian Primera División | 31 | 7 | 0 | 0 | 5 | 0 | 0 | 0 | 36 | 7 |
| The Strongest | 2025 | Bolivian Primera División | 11 | 5 | 4 | 1 | 0 | 0 | 0 | 0 | 15 | 6 |
| Career total | | | 118 | 28 | 10 | 1 | 13 | 0 | 0 | 0 | 141 | 29 |

=== International ===
As of match played 10 October 2024

| National team | Year | Apps | Goals |
|---|---|---|---|
| Bolivia | 2021 | 4 | 0 |
| Bolivia | 2022 | 1 | 0 |
| Bolivia | 2023 | 4 | 0 |
| Bolivia | 2024 | 1 | 0 |
| Total | | 10 | 0 |
