= Nicolás Figueroa =

Peruvian footballer (born 2002)

Personal information
- Full name: Nicolás Amadeo Figueroa Rodríguez
- Date of birth: 24 May 2002 (age 24)
- Place of birth: Lima, Peru
- Height: 1.80 m (5 ft 11 in)
- Position: Forward

Team information
- Current team: FBC Melgar
- Number: 18

Youth career
- Universidad San Martín

Senior career*
Years	Team	Apps	(Gls)
2019–2021	Universidad San Martín	55	(2)
2022–	Melgar	0	(0)
2023–2024	→ Atlético Grau (loan)	20	(1)
2025	→ Binacional (loan)	12	(1)
2025	→ Comerciantes Unidos (loan)	8	(0)

International career^{‡}
2019–2021	Peru U17	8	(3)
- * Club domestic league appearances and goals as of 2 January 2026 ‡ National team caps and goals as of 05:00, 10 November 2019 (UTC)

Nicolás Amadeo Figueroa Rodríguez (born 24 May 2002) is a Peruvian footballer who plays as a forward for FBC Melgar.

== Career statistics ==
=== Club ===
As of 10 November 2019.

Club	Season	League			Cup		Continental		Other		Total	
Club	Season	Division	Apps	Goals	Apps	Goals	Apps	Goals	Apps	Goals	Apps	Goals
USMP	2019	Peruvian Primera División	9	0	0	0	0	0	0	0	9	0
Career total			9	0	0	0	0	0	0	0	9	0
