= Mathías Llontop =

Peruvian footballer (born 2002)

Personal information
- Full name: Mathías Daniel Llontop Díaz
- Date of birth: 22 May 2002 (age 24)
- Place of birth: Lima, Peru
- Height: 1.69 m (5 ft 7 in)
- Position: Left back

Team information
- Current team: Melgar
- Number: 13

Youth career
- –2020: USMP

Senior career*
Years	Team	Apps	(Gls)
2020–2021	USMP	6	(0)
2022–2024	Mannucci	63	(1)
2025–	Melgar	22	(0)

International career^{‡}
2019	Peru U17	9	(1)
- * Club domestic league appearances and goals as of 30 December 2025 ‡ National team caps and goals as of 05:00, 1 October 2020 (UTC)

Mathías Daniel Llontop Díaz (born 22 May 2002) is a Peruvian footballer who plays as a left back for Melgar and the Peru national team.

== Career statistics ==
=== Club ===
As of 29 October 2023.

Club	Division	Season	League		Cup		Total	
Club	Division	Season	Apps	Goals	Apps	Goals	Apps	Goals
USMP	Liga 1	2020	3	0	—		3	0
USMP	Liga 1	2021	2	0	1	0	3	0
USMP	Total		5	0	1	0	6	0
Mannucci	Liga 1	2022	16	0	—		16	0
Mannucci	Liga 1	2023	17	1	—		17	1
Mannucci	Total		33	1	0	0	33	1
Career total			38	1	1	0	39	1
