= Óscar Pinto (footballer) =

Peruvian footballer (born 2002)

Personal information
- Full name: Óscar Manuel Pinto Marín
- Date of birth: 22 January 2002 (age 24)
- Place of birth: Lima, Peru
- Height: 1.77 m (5 ft 10 in)
- Position: Forward

Team information
- Current team: ADT
- Number: 18

Youth career
- Universidad San Martín

Senior career*
| Years | Team | Apps | (Gls) |
| 2019 | Universidad San Martín | 4 | (0) |
| 2020–2025 | Alianza Lima | 15 | (0) |
| 2020 | → Univ. San Martín (loan) | 6 | (0) |
| 2023 | → Sport Boys (loan) | 3 | (0) |
| 2024 | → Comerciantes Unidos (loan) | 32 | (2) |
| 2025– | ADT | 0 | (0) |

International career^{‡}
| 2017 | Peru U15 | 6 | (0) |
| 2019 | Peru U17 | 9 | (3) |
| 2020– | Peru U20 | 2 | (0) |
- * Club domestic league appearances and goals as of 30 December 2025 ‡ National team caps and goals as of 20:20, 25 April 2021 (UTC)

Óscar Manuel Pinto Marín (born 22 January 2002) is a Peruvian footballer who plays as a forward for ADT.

== Career ==
In mid-February 2020, Pinto was bought by Alianza Lima and loaned out back to Universidad San Martín.

== Career statistics ==
=== Club ===
As of 3 November 2024.

| Club | Division | Season | League | | Cup | | Continental | | Total | |
| Club | Division | Season | Apps | Goals | Apps | Goals | Apps | Goals | Apps | Goals |
|---|---|---|---|---|---|---|---|---|---|---|
| Universidad de San Martín | Peruvian Primera División | 2019 | 4 | 0 | 2 | 1 | — | | 6 | 1 |
| Universidad de San Martín | Peruvian Primera División | 2020 | 6 | 0 | — | | — | | 6 | 0 |
| Universidad de San Martín | Total | | 10 | 0 | 2 | 1 | 0 | 0 | 12 | 1 |
| Alianza Lima | Peruvian Primera División | 2021 | 1 | 0 | 0 | 0 | — | | 1 | 0 |
| Alianza Lima | Peruvian Primera División | 2022 | 10 | 0 | — | | 0 | 0 | 10 | 0 |
| Alianza Lima | Peruvian Primera División | 2023 | 4 | 0 | — | | 0 | 0 | 4 | 0 |
| Alianza Lima | Total | | 15 | 0 | 0 | 0 | 0 | 0 | 15 | 0 |
| Sport Boys | Peruvian Primera División | 2023 | 3 | 0 | — | | — | | 3 | 0 |
| Comerciantes Unidos | Peruvian Primera División | 2024 | 32 | 2 | — | | — | | 32 | 2 |
| Career total | | | 60 | 2 | 2 | 1 | 0 | 0 | 62 | 3 |
