= Rodolpho Toski =

Brazilian football referee (born 1987)

- Born: Rodolpho Toski Marques; 5 April 1987 (age 39); Curitiba, Paraná, Brazil

Domestic
Years	League	Role
2015–present	Campeonato Brasileiro Série A	Referee

International
Years	League	Role
2017–present	FIFA listed	Referee; VAR

Rodolpho Toski Marques (born 5 April 1987) is a Brazilian football referee who has been listed on the FIFA International Referees List since 2017.

== Career ==
Toski was born in April 1987 in Curitiba and became involved in refereeing at a professional level in 2012. He is a member of the Federação Paranaense de Futebol, and aside from being a referee, he works in administration. The records of the Brazilian Football Confederation show his first matches in Série A in 2015. Toski took part in several lower divisions as well as youth tournaments of the country's leagues.

In 2017, Toski earned the FIFA badge when he also began overseeing matches at CONMEBOL competitions. He has refereed games at Copa Sudamericana and Copa Libertadores, including an Argentine Superclásico between River Plate and Boca Juniors in 2019. At the international level, Toski was selected as a video assistant referee (VAR) official for the 2023 FIFA U-20 World Cup in Argentina.

Toski was also appointed for the 2024 Copa América in the United States, assisting the Brazilian representatives led by referee Raphael Claus as a VAR official. He reached the final match of that tournament, serving as VAR for Claus and the assistant referees in the game between Argentina and Colombia.

In April 2026, Toski was selected as VAR for the 2026 FIFA World Cup in North America.
