= Yuriel Celi =

Peruvian footballer (born 2002)

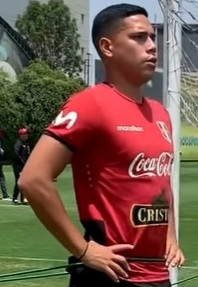

Personal information
- Full name: Yuriel Darío Celi Guerrero
- Date of birth: 20 February 2002 (age 24)
- Place of birth: Callao, Peru
- Height: 1.77 m (5 ft 10 in)
- Position: Central midfielder

Team information
- Current team: Sport Boys

Youth career
- 2014–2016: Club Universitario de Deportes
- 2017–2019: Academia Cantolao

Senior career*
Years	Team	Apps	(Gls)
2019–2022	Academia Cantolao	57	(9)
2022–2023	Carlos A. Mannucci	33	(4)
2023–2025	Hull City	0	(0)
2023–2024	→ Universitario de Deportes (loan)	20	(1)
2025–	Universitario de Deportes	0	(0)
2025	→ Deportivo Garcilaso (loan)	30	(0)
2026-	→ Sport Boys (loan)	0	(0)

International career^{‡}
2017	Peru U15	5	(2)
2018–2020	Peru U17	17	(5)
2019	Peru U18	2	(0)
2019	Peru U20	4	(1)
2019–	Peru U23	15	(0)
2022–	Peru	1	(0)
- * Club domestic league appearances and goals as of 16:19, 28 July 2024 (UTC) ‡ National team caps and goals as of 05:00, 1 September 2022 (UTC)

Yuriel Darío Celi Guerrero (born 20 February 2002) is a Peruvian footballer who plays as a central midfielder for Peruvian Primera División club Sport Boys on loan from Universitario de Deportes.

== Career ==
Celi played in the youth system of Academia Cantolao from the age of 8, progressing through its ranks until signing his first professional contract with the club in December 2018, thanks to his good performances.

== Career statistics ==
=== Club ===
As of 7 May 2024

Appearances and goals by club, season and competition
Club	Season	League			National cup		League cup		Continental		Other		Total	
Club	Season	Division	Apps	Goals	Apps	Goals	Apps	Goals	Apps	Goals	Apps	Goals	Apps	Goals
Academia Cantolao	2019	Primera División	15	1	2	0	—		0	0	0	0	17	1
Academia Cantolao	2020	Primera División	24	6	0	0	—		0	0	0	0	24	6
Academia Cantolao	2021	Primera División	18	2	1	0	—		0	0	0	0	19	2
Academia Cantolao	Total		57	9	3	0	—		0	0	0	0	60	9
Mannucci	2022	Primera División	33	4	0	0	—		0	0	0	0	33	4
Universitario (on loan)	2023	Primera División	10	0	0	0	—		1 (Note: Appearances in Copa Sudamericana)	0	0	0	11	0
Universitario (on loan)	2024	Primera División	7	1	0	0	—		2 (Note: Appearances in Copa Libertadores)	0	0	0	9	0
Universitario (on loan)	Total		17	1	0	0	—		3	0	0	0	20	0
Hull City	2024–25	EFL Championship	0	0	0	0	0	0	—		—		0	0
Career total			107	14	3	1	0	0	3	0	0	0	113	13

=== International ===
As of match played 19 November 2022

Appearances and goals by national team and year
National team	Year	Apps	Goals
Peru	2022	1	0
Total		1	0

== Honours ==
Universitario de Deportes

- Peruvian Primera División: 2023, 2024
