= Ecuador national under-17 football team =

Ecuador U-17
- Nickname: La Tri
- Association: Federación Ecuatoriana de Fútbol (Ecuadorian Football Federation)
- Confederation: CONMEBOL (South America)
- Head coach: Gonzalo Ferrea
- FIFA code: ECU
First colours	Second colours

FIFA U-17 World Cup
- Appearances: 6 (first in 1987)
- Best result: Quarter-Finals (1995, 2015)

CONMEBOL Sub17
- Appearances: 18 (first in 1985)
- Best result: Runners-up (2023)

The Ecuador national under-17 football team represents Ecuador in international under-17 football competitions and is controlled by the Ecuadorian Football Federation.

== Competitive record ==
=== FIFA U-17 World Cup ===
Year	Result	Position	Pld	W	D	L	GF	GA
(China) 1985	Did not qualify							
(Canada) 1987	Group stage	12th	3	1	0	2	1	2
(Scotland) 1989	Did not qualify							
(Italy) 1991	Did not qualify							
(Japan) 1993	Did not qualify							
(Ecuador) 1995	Quarter-finals	7th	4	1	1	2	4	5
(Egypt) 1997	Did not qualify							
(New Zealand) 1999	Did not qualify							
(Trinidad and Tobago) 2001	Did not qualify							
(Finland) 2003	Did not qualify							
(Peru) 2005	Did not qualify							
(South Korea) 2007	Did not qualify							
(Nigeria) 2009	Did not qualify							
(Mexico) 2011	Round of 16	9th	4	2	0	2	5	9
(United Arab Emirates) 2013	Did not qualify							
(Chile) 2015	Quarter-finals	5th	5	3	0	2	10	6
(India) 2017	Did not qualify							
(Brazil) 2019	Round of 16	10th	4	2	0	2	7	7
(Indonesia) 2023	Round of 16	14th	4	1	2	1	5	5
(Qatar) 2025	Did not qualify							
(Qatar) 2026	In progress	TBD	1	1	0	0	1	0
(Qatar) 2027	To be determined							
(Qatar) 2028	To be determined							
(Qatar) 2029	To be determined							
Total:7/24	Quarter-finals	5th	25	11	3	11	33	34

=== CONMEBOL Sub17 ===
CONMEBOL Sub17 record
Year	Round	Position	GP	W	D*	L	GS	GA
(Argentina) 1985	Third Place	3rd	8	4	0	4	13	13
(Peru) 1986	Third Place	3rd	7	2	5	0	10	6
(Ecuador) 1988	Group Stage	8th	4	1	0	3	3	6
(Paraguay) 1991	Group Stage	7th	4	1	1	2	9	8
(Colombia) 1993	Group Stage	8th	4	1	0	3	4	9
(Peru) 1995	Did Not Enter							
(Paraguay) 1997	Group Stage	8th	4	1	1	2	6	8
(Uruguay) 1999	Group Stage	5th	4	1	2	1	7	4
(Peru) 2001	Group Stage	8th	4	1	1	2	6	8
(Bolivia) 2003	Group Stage	6th	4	1	0	3	4	9
(Venezuela) 2005	Third Place	3rd	7	4	0	3	17	17
(Ecuador) 2007	Sixth Place	6th	9	2	2	5	11	17
(Chile) 2009	Sixth Place	6th	7	1	2	4	6	13
(Ecuador) 2011	Fourth Place	4th	9	3	4	2	10	11
(Argentina) 2013	Group Stage	7th	4	1	1	2	2	4
(Paraguay) 2015	Third Place	3rd	9	5	2	2	16	8
(Chile) 2017	Sixth Place	6th	9	2	1	6	8	15
(Peru) 2019	Fourth Place	4th	9	3	3	3	12	13
(Ecuador) 2023	Runners-up	2nd	9	4	4	1	17	9
Total	Runners-up	18/19	115	38	29	48	161	178

*Draws include knockout matches decided on penalty kicks.

== Honours ==
- CONMEBOL Sub17
  - Runners-up (1): 2023
  - Third place (4): 1985, 1986, 2005, 2015
- Pan American Games
  - Gold medal (1): 2007
- South American Games
  - Silver medal (1): 2010
  - Bronze medal (1): 2014
- Bolivarian Games
  - Silver medal (3): 2009, 2013, 2017
  - Bronze medal (1): 2005

== Current squad ==
The following players are called up to the squad for the 2025 South American U-17 Championship between 27 March – 12 April 2025.

Caps and goals correct as of 30 March 2025, after the match against Uruguay.

No.	Pos.	Player	Date of birth (age)	Caps	Goals	Club
1	GK	Miguel Peralta	26 April 2008 (age 18)	1	0	(Ecuadorian Football Federation) Independiente del Valle
12	GK	Mijaíl Vaca	16 November 2009 (age 17)	1	0	(Ecuadorian Football Federation) El Nacional
22	GK	Gaikler Angulo	28 June 2010 (age 16)	0	0	(Ecuadorian Football Federation) Independiente del Valle
2	DF	Virgilio Olaya	3 February 2008 (age 18)	2	0	(Ecuadorian Football Federation) Aucas
3	DF	Deinner Ordóñez	29 October 2009 (age 17)	2	0	(Ecuadorian Football Federation) Independiente del Valle
4	DF	Darío Castillo	6 February 2008 (age 18)	1	0	(Ecuadorian Football Federation) Barcelona
6	DF	Fricio Caicedo	17 April 2008 (age 18)	2	0	(Ecuadorian Football Federation) LDU Quito
13	DF	Adrián Cuadrado	10 March 2009 (age 17)	1	0	(Royal Spanish Football Federation) Barcelona
14	DF	Jordan Mejía	1 September 2008 (age 18)	0	0	(Royal Spanish Football Federation) Elche
5	MF	Bolívar Tobar	28 August 2008 (age 18)	2	0	(Ecuadorian Football Federation) Emelec
8	MF	Christian Ortíz	5 January 2008 (age 18)	1	0	(Ecuadorian Football Federation) Orense
10	MF	Justin Lerma	5 May 2008 (age 18)	4	0	(Ecuadorian Football Federation) Independiente del Valle
15	MF	Diego Monzón	4 February 2008 (age 18)	1	0	(Royal Spanish Football Federation) Real Zaragoza
16	MF	Yaxi García	30 May 2008 (age 18)	0	0	(Ecuadorian Football Federation) Barcelona
18	MF	Jhosué Minda	29 September 2008 (age 18)	2	0	(Ecuadorian Football Federation) LDU Quito
20	MF	Malcom Dacosta	17 April 2008 (age 18)	1	0	(The Football Association) Bournemouth
7	FW	Iker Mantilla	6 February 2009 (age 17)	0	0	(Royal Spanish Football Federation) Mallorca
9	FW	Elias Legendre	22 April 2008 (age 18)	1	1	(French Football Federation) Rennes
11	FW	Edwin Quintero	15 August 2009 (age 17)	2	0	(Ecuadorian Football Federation) Independiente del Valle
17	FW	Juan Sánchez	24 June 2008 (age 18)	0	0	(Ecuadorian Football Federation) Orense
19	FW	Juan Angulo	12 January 2008 (age 18)	1	1	(Ecuadorian Football Federation) Independiente del Valle
21	FW	Randy Preciado	3 January 2008 (age 18)	0	0	(Ecuadorian Football Federation) Manta
23	FW	Leao Tenorio	23 August 2008 (age 18)	1	0	(Ecuadorian Football Federation) Delfín

== See also ==
- Ecuador national football team
- Ecuador national under-20 football team
