= Paraguay national under-17 football team =

National U-17 association football team

Paraguay
- Association: Asociación Paraguaya de Fútbol
- Confederation: CONMEBOL (South America)
- Head coach: (Argentina) Mariano Uglessich
- Home stadium: Estadio Defensores del Chaco
- FIFA code: PAR
| First colours | Second colours |

First international
- NA

FIFA U-17 World Cup
- Appearances: 6 (first in 1999)
- Best result: Quarterfinals (1999, 2019)

South American U-17 Championship
- Appearances: 18 (first in 1986)
- Best result: Runners-up (1999)

The Paraguay national under-17 football team represents Paraguay in international football competitions such as FIFA U-17 World Cup and South American Under-17 Football Championship.

== Overview ==
The team has participated in 6 events of the FIFA U-17 World Cup and their best performance came in the 1999 World Cup held in New Zealand, when Paraguay reached the quarterfinals and finished in 5th place. Their best performance at the South American level came in the 1999 tournament in Uruguay when they finished in second place, along with two third-place finishes in 2001 and 2017 as well as three fourth-place finishes in 1988, 1997 and 2015.

In 2001, the team were crowned champions of the Milk Cup after defeating Manchester United 6–0.

== Tournament records ==
=== FIFA U-17 World Cup ===
FIFA U-17 World Cup record
| Hosts / Year | Result | GP | W | D* | L | GS | GA |
|---|---|---|---|---|---|---|---|
| (China) 1985 | Did not enter | | | | | | |
| (Canada) 1987 | Did not qualify | | | | | | |
| (Scotland) 1989 | Did not qualify | | | | | | |
| (Italy) 1991 | Did not qualify | | | | | | |
| (Japan) 1993 | Did not qualify | | | | | | |
| (Ecuador) 1995 | Did not qualify | | | | | | |
| (Egypt) 1997 | Did not qualify | | | | | | |
| (New Zealand) 1999 | Quarterfinals | 4 | 2 | 1 | 1 | 10 | 6 |
| (Trinidad and Tobago) 2001 | Group Stage | 3 | 2 | 0 | 1 | 5 | 6 |
| (Finland) 2003 | Did not qualify | | | | | | |
| (Peru) 2005 | Did not qualify | | | | | | |
| (South Korea) 2007 | Did not qualify | | | | | | |
| (Nigeria) 2009 | Did not qualify | | | | | | |
| (Mexico) 2011 | Did not qualify | | | | | | |
| (United Arab Emirates) 2013 | Did not qualify | | | | | | |
| (Chile) 2015 | Group Stage | 3 | 1 | 0 | 2 | 8 | 7 |
| (India) 2017 | Round of 16 | 4 | 3 | 0 | 1 | 10 | 10 |
| (Brazil) 2019 | Quarterfinals | 5 | 3 | 1 | 1 | 13 | 7 |
| (Indonesia) 2023 | Did not qualify | | | | | | |
| (Qatar) 2025 | Round of 32 | 4 | 1 | 2 | 1 | 3 | 3 |
| (Qatar) 2026 | Did not qualify | | | | | | |
| (Qatar) 2027 | To be determined | | | | | | |
| (Qatar) 2028 | To be determined | | | | | | |
| (Qatar) 2029 | To be determined | | | | | | |
| Total | 6/20 | 23 | 12 | 4 | 7 | 49 | 39 |

=== South American Under-17 Football Championship ===
South American Under-17 Football Championship record
| Hosts / Year | Result | GP | W | D* | L | GS | GA |
|---|---|---|---|---|---|---|---|
| (Argentina) 1985 | Did not enter | | | | | | |
| (Peru) 1986 | Group Stage | 4 | 1 | 0 | 3 | 4 | 6 |
| (Ecuador) 1988 | Fourth Place | 7 | 3 | 0 | 4 | 6 | 11 |
| (Paraguay) 1991 | Group Stage | 4 | 1 | 3 | 0 | 6 | 4 |
| (Colombia) 1993 | Group Stage | 4 | 2 | 0 | 2 | 7 | 6 |
| (Peru) 1995 | Group Stage | 4 | 1 | 1 | 2 | 6 | 6 |
| (Paraguay) 1997 | Fourth Place | 7 | 3 | 1 | 3 | 8 | 9 |
| (Uruguay) 1999 | Runners-up | 6 | 3 | 0 | 3 | 10 | 13 |
| (Peru) 2001 | Third Place | 7 | 2 | 4 | 1 | 15 | 12 |
| (Bolivia) 2003 | Group Stage | 4 | 2 | 0 | 2 | 7 | 10 |
| (Venezuela) 2005 | Group Stage | 4 | 3 | 0 | 1 | 12 | 8 |
| (Ecuador) 2007 | Group Stage | 4 | 0 | 1 | 3 | 3 | 10 |
| (Chile) 2009 | Group Stage | 4 | 1 | 1 | 2 | 3 | 7 |
| (Ecuador) 2011 | Sixth Place | 9 | 3 | 1 | 5 | 14 | 16 |
| (Argentina) 2013 | Fifth Place | 9 | 3 | 3 | 3 | 14 | 12 |
| (Paraguay) 2015 | Fourth Place | 9 | 4 | 3 | 2 | 19 | 15 |
| (Chile) 2017 | Third Place | 9 | 4 | 4 | 1 | 16 | 10 |
| (Peru) 2019 | Third Place | 9 | 3 | 4 | 2 | 13 | 13 |
| (Ecuador) 2023 | Fifth Place | 9 | 3 | 3 | 3 | 13 | 11 |
| (Colombia) 2025 | Fifth Place | 6 | 2 | 2 | 2 | 8 | 6 |
| (Paraguay) 2026 | Group Stage | | | | | | |
| Total | 19/20 | 119 | 44 | 31 | 44 | 184 | 185 |

*Draws include knockout matches decided on penalty kicks.

== Current squad ==
The final 21-player squad was announced on 20 October 2025 for the 2025 FIFA U-17 World Cup.

| No. | Pos. | Player | Date of birth (age) | Club |
|---|---|---|---|---|
| 1 | GK | Matías Fernández | 10 June 2009 (aged 16) | (Paraguayan Football Association) Olimpia |
| 2 | DF | Thiago Aranda | 25 February 2008 (aged 17) | (Paraguayan Football Association) Olimpia |
| 3 | DF | Ymanol Ruiz | 12 November 2008 (aged 16) | (Paraguayan Football Association) Olimpia |
| 4 | MF | Diego Ruiz | 29 March 2008 (aged 17) | (Paraguayan Football Association) Libertad |
| 5 | DF | Edgar Ojeda | 1 December 2008 (aged 16) | (Paraguayan Football Association) Libertad |
| 6 | DF | Leo Cristaldo | 12 January 2009 (aged 16) | (Argentine Football Association) Vélez Sarsfield |
| 7 | MF | Derlis Almada | 14 February 2008 (aged 17) | (Paraguayan Football Association) Libertad |
| 8 | MF | Alan Ledesma | 4 September 2008 (aged 17) | (Paraguayan Football Association) Olimpia |
| 9 | FW | Mauricio De Carvalho | 4 February 2008 (aged 17) | (Paraguayan Football Association) Cerro Porteño |
| 10 | MF | Carlos Franco | 5 January 2008 (aged 17) | (Paraguayan Football Association) Cerro Porteño |
| 11 | FW | José Buhring | 17 February 2008 (aged 17) | (Paraguayan Football Association) Libertad |
| 12 | GK | Rainero Laratro | 7 March 2008 (aged 17) | (Paraguayan Football Association) Libertad |
| 13 | DF | Mauro Coronel | 25 May 2008 (aged 17) | (Paraguayan Football Association) Nacional |
| 14 | MF | Jhosias Campss | 17 February 2008 (aged 17) | (Paraguayan Football Association) Nacional |
| 15 | MF | Aldo Sanabria | 9 May 2008 (aged 17) | (Paraguayan Football Association) Cerro Porteño |
| 16 | MF | Manuel Cáceres | 13 February 2009 (aged 16) | (Paraguayan Football Association) Guaraní |
| 17 | MF | Thiago Vera | 14 June 2008 (aged 17) | (Paraguayan Football Association) Libertad |
| 18 | FW | Milán Freyres | 8 December 2008 (aged 16) | (Paraguayan Football Association) Olimpia |
| 19 | DF | Tobías Acosta | 23 January 2008 (aged 17) | (Paraguayan Football Association) Olimpia |
| 20 | MF | Pedro Villalba | 9 July 2008 (aged 17) | (Paraguayan Football Association) Libertad |
| 21 | GK | Diego Rodríguez | 22 July 2008 (aged 17) | (Paraguayan Football Association) Cerro Porteño |

== See also ==
- Paraguay national football team
- Paraguay national under-23 football team
- Paraguay national under-20 football team
- Paraguay women's national under-17 football team
