= 2019 FIFA U-17 World Cup squads =

List of all the national team squads that participated in the 2019 FIFA U-17 World Cup

The following is a list of all the national team squads that participated in the 2019 FIFA U-17 World Cup.

Each team had to name a squad of 21 players (three of whom had to be goalkeepers) by the FIFA deadline. All players of its representative team had to have been born on or after 1 January 2002. The age listed for each player is on 26 October 2019, the first day of the tournament. Those marked in bold have been capped with the senior national team.

== Group A ==
=== Brazil ===
Brazil named their squad on 20 September 2019.

Head coach: Guilherme Dalla Déa

No.	Pos.	Player	Date of birth (age)	Club
1	GK	Matheus Donelli	17 May 2002 (aged 17)	(Brazilian Football Confederation) Corinthians
2	DF	**Yan Couto**	3 June 2002 (aged 17)	(Brazilian Football Confederation) Coritiba
3	DF	Henri	19 February 2002 (aged 17)	(Brazilian Football Confederation) Palmeiras
4	DF	Luan Patrick	20 January 2002 (aged 17)	(Brazilian Football Confederation) Athletico Paranaense
5	MF	Daniel Cabral	14 May 2002 (aged 17)	(Brazilian Football Confederation) Flamengo
6	DF	Patryck	18 January 2003 (aged 16)	(Brazilian Football Confederation) São Paulo
7	FW	Gabriel Veron	3 September 2002 (aged 17)	(Brazilian Football Confederation) Palmeiras
8	MF	Talles Costa	2 August 2002 (aged 17)	(Brazilian Football Confederation) São Paulo
9	FW	**Kaio Jorge**	24 January 2002 (aged 17)	(Brazilian Football Confederation) Santos
10	FW	João Peglow	7 January 2002 (aged 17)	(Brazilian Football Confederation) Internacional
11	FW	Talles Magno	26 June 2002 (aged 17)	(Brazilian Football Confederation) Vasco da Gama
12	GK	Marcelo Pitaluga	20 December 2002 (aged 16)	(Brazilian Football Confederation) Fluminense
13	DF	Gustavo Garcia	4 January 2002 (aged 17)	(Brazilian Football Confederation) Palmeiras
14	DF	Gabriel Noga	25 January 2002 (aged 17)	(Brazilian Football Confederation) Flamengo
15	DF	Renan	19 May 2002 (aged 17)	(Brazilian Football Confederation) Palmeiras
16	MF	Sandry	30 August 2002 (aged 17)	(Brazilian Football Confederation) Santos
17	MF	Diego Rosa	12 October 2002 (aged 17)	(Brazilian Football Confederation) Grêmio
18	MF	Matheus Araújo	22 May 2002 (aged 17)	(Brazilian Football Confederation) Corinthians
19	MF	Pedro Lucas	26 July 2002 (aged 17)	(Brazilian Football Confederation) Grêmio
20	MF	Lázaro	12 March 2002 (aged 17)	(Brazilian Football Confederation) Flamengo
21	GK	Cristian	25 February 2002 (aged 17)	(Brazilian Football Confederation) Atlético Mineiro

=== Canada ===
Head coach: Andrew Olivieri

No.	Pos.	Player	Date of birth (age)	Club
1	GK	Marc Kouadio	12 February 2002 (aged 17)	(United States Soccer Federation) Montverde Academy
2	DF	Kobe Franklin	10 May 2003 (aged 16)	(Canadian Soccer Association) Toronto FC
3	DF	Rohan Goulbourne	1 April 2002 (aged 17)	(Canadian Soccer Association) Toronto FC
4	MF	Damiano Pecile	11 April 2002 (aged 17)	(Canadian Soccer Association) Vancouver Whitecaps FC
5	DF	Gianfranco Facchineri	27 April 2002 (aged 17)	(Canadian Soccer Association) Vancouver Whitecaps FC
6	DF	Nathan Demian	16 March 2002 (aged 17)	(Canadian Soccer Association) Vancouver Whitecaps FC
7	FW	Kamron Habibullah	23 October 2003 (aged 16)	(Canadian Soccer Association) Vancouver Whitecaps FC
8	MF	**Ralph Priso**	2 August 2002 (aged 17)	(Canadian Soccer Association) Toronto FC
9	FW	**Jacen Russell-Rowe**	13 September 2002 (aged 17)	(Canadian Soccer Association) Toronto FC
10	FW	Matthew Catavolo	13 February 2003 (aged 16)	(Canadian Soccer Association) Montreal Impact
11	FW	**Jayden Nelson**	26 September 2002 (aged 17)	(Canadian Soccer Association) Toronto FC
12	DF	Deylen Vellios	26 February 2002 (aged 17)	(Canadian Soccer Association) Vancouver Whitecaps FC
13	DF	Keesean Ferdinand	17 August 2003 (aged 16)	(Canadian Soccer Association) Montreal Impact
14	MF	Tomas Giraldo	8 March 2003 (aged 16)	(Canadian Soccer Association) Montreal Impact
15	DF	Emiliano Brienza	9 May 2002 (aged 17)	(Canadian Soccer Association) Vancouver Whitecaps FC
16	MF	Deandre Kerr	29 November 2002 (aged 16)	(Canadian Soccer Association) Toronto FC
17	MF	Sean Rea	15 May 2002 (aged 17)	(Canadian Soccer Association) Montreal Impact
18	GK	Eleias Himaras	8 March 2002 (aged 17)	(Canadian Soccer Association) Toronto FC
19	FW	Mouhamadou Kane	12 October 2003 (aged 16)	(Canadian Soccer Association) Montreal Impact
20	MF	Julian Altobelli	4 November 2002 (aged 16)	(Canadian Soccer Association) Toronto FC
21	GK	Benjamin Collins	6 January 2002 (aged 17)	(Canadian Soccer Association) Montreal Impact

=== Angola ===
Head coach: (Portugal) Pedro Gonçalves

No.	Pos.	Player	Date of birth (age)	Club
1	GK	Edmilson Cambila	16 May 2002 (aged 17)	(Angolan Football Federation) A.F.A.
2	DF	Porfírio	9 April 2002 (aged 17)	(Angolan Football Federation) A.F.A.
3	MF	**Maestro**	4 August 2003 (aged 16)	(Angolan Football Federation) A.F.A.
4	DF	**Domingos**	7 May 2003 (aged 16)	(Angolan Football Federation) Interclube
5	DF	Mimo	13 March 2002 (aged 17)	(Angolan Football Federation) A.F.A.
6	MF	Manilson	20 March 2002 (aged 17)	(Angolan Football Federation) 1º de Agosto
7	FW	**Capita**	10 January 2002 (aged 17)	(Angolan Football Federation) 1º de Agosto
8	DF	Nelinho	8 July 2002 (aged 17)	(Angolan Football Federation) Petro de Luanda
9	FW	David Nzanza	28 September 2003 (aged 16)	(Angolan Football Federation) Interclube
10	FW	**Zito Luvumbo**	9 March 2002 (aged 17)	(Angolan Football Federation) 1º de Agosto
11	FW	Abdoul Barri	7 January 2002 (aged 17)	(Angolan Football Federation) Interclube
12	GK	Geovani	22 June 2002 (aged 17)	(Angolan Football Federation) 1º de Agosto
13	DF	Tino	21 July 2003 (aged 16)	(Angolan Football Federation) Real Sambila
14	MF	Pedro Banga	14 July 2003 (aged 16)	(South African Football Association) Mamelodi Sundowns
15	DF	Afonso Binga	23 April 2002 (aged 17)	(Angolan Football Federation) 1º de Agosto
16	MF	**Beni Mukendi**	21 May 2002 (aged 17)	(Angolan Football Federation) Petro de Luanda
17	MF	Netinho	18 July 2002 (aged 17)	(Angolan Football Federation) A.F.A.
18	DF	Pablo	14 November 2003 (aged 15)	(Angolan Football Federation) 1º de Agosto
19	DF	Gegé	17 September 2002 (aged 17)	(Angolan Football Federation) Petro de Luanda
20	FW	**Zini**	3 July 2002 (aged 17)	(Angolan Football Federation) 1º de Agosto
21	GK	Vicente Pedro	14 October 2003 (aged 16)	(Angolan Football Federation) Petro de Luanda

=== New Zealand ===
New Zealand announced their squad on 23 September 2019.

Head coach: (England) José Figueira

No.	Pos.	Player	Date of birth (age)	Club
1	GK	**Alex Paulsen**	4 June 2002 (aged 17)	(New Zealand Football) Lower Hutt City AFC
2	DF	Max Drake	6 September 2002 (aged 17)	(New Zealand Football) Lower Hutt City AFC
3	DF	Kris Naicker	8 December 2002 (aged 16)	(New Zealand Football) Lower Hutt City AFC
4	DF	Jackson Simpkin	21 August 2002 (aged 17)	(Football Australia) Brisbane City
5	DF	Adam Hillis	3 February 2002 (aged 17)	(New Zealand Football) Lower Hutt City AFC
6	DF	Campbell Strong	10 May 2002 (aged 17)	(New Zealand Football) Eastern Suburbs
7	FW	Keegan Jelacic	31 July 2002 (aged 17)	(Football Australia) Queensland Lions FC
8	MF	Henry Hamilton	8 April 2002 (aged 17)	(New Zealand Football) Lower Hutt City AFC
9	FW	**Jesse Randall**	19 August 2002 (aged 17)	(New Zealand Football) North Wellington AFC
10	MF	**Marko Stamenic**	19 February 2002 (aged 17)	(New Zealand Football) Western Suburbs
11	FW	**Matthew Garbett**	13 April 2002 (aged 17)	(New Zealand Football) Western Suburbs
12	GK	Luca Taylor	21 September 2002 (aged 17)	(New Zealand Football) Auckland City FC
13	DF	Finn O'Conner	14 January 2002 (aged 17)	(New Zealand Football) Lower Hutt City AFC
14	FW	**Oskar van Hattum**	14 April 2002 (aged 17)	(New Zealand Football) Lower Hutt City AFC
15	DF	Bradley Wilson	31 March 2002 (aged 17)	(New Zealand Football) Auckland City FC
16	MF	Sean Bright	28 January 2002 (aged 17)	(New Zealand Football) Western Suburbs
17	DF	Nathan Lobo	16 December 2002 (aged 16)	(New Zealand Football) Auckland City FC
18	MF	**Ben Old**	13 August 2002 (aged 17)	(New Zealand Football) Lower Hutt City AFC
19	DF	Harry Bark	12 June 2002 (aged 17)	(New Zealand Football) Lower Hutt City AFC
20	MF	Otto Ingham	4 February 2002 (aged 17)	(New Zealand Football) Western Suburbs
21	GK	Callum Kennett	26 March 2004 (aged 15)	(New Zealand Football) Lower Hutt City AFC

== Group B ==
=== Nigeria ===
Nigeria announced a squad of 25 players on 10 October 2019, which was reduced to 21 on 16 October.

Head coach: Manu Garba

No.	Pos.	Player	Date of birth (age)	Club
1	GK	Sunday Stephen	20 September 2002 (aged 17)	(Nigeria Football Federation) Abuja Football College
2	FW	Oluwatimilehin Adeniyi	12 May 2003 (aged 16)	(Nigeria Football Federation) Sporting Dreams FC
3	DF	Charles Etim	10 October 2003 (aged 16)	(Nigeria Football Federation) Blessed Stars Academy
4	MF	**Samson Tijani**	17 May 2002 (aged 17)	(Nigeria Football Federation) Collings Edwin FC
5	DF	Clement Ikenna	16 March 2003 (aged 16)	(Nigeria Football Federation) A&B Academy
6	DF	Usman Ibrahim	2 March 2003 (aged 16)	(Nigeria Football Federation) Giant Brilliants FC
7	FW	Olakunle Olusegun	23 April 2002 (aged 17)	(Nigeria Football Federation) ABS
8	MF	Hamzat Ojediran	14 November 2003 (aged 15)	(Nigeria Football Federation) Jossy United FC
9	FW	Wisdom Ubani	16 May 2003 (aged 16)	(Nigeria Football Federation) Giant Brilliants FC
10	MF	Peter Agba	20 December 2002 (aged 16)	(Nigeria Football Federation) Falala Academy
11	DF	Quadri Edun	27 April 2003 (aged 16)	(Nigeria Football Federation) G12 FC
12	FW	Peter Olawale	26 July 2002 (aged 17)	(Nigeria Football Federation) Tripple 44 FC
13	FW	Akinkunmi Amoo	7 June 2002 (aged 17)	(Nigeria Football Federation) Sidos FC
14	MF	Daniel Francis	27 September 2003 (aged 16)	(Nigeria Football Federation) FC Hearts
15	MF	Monsuru Opeyemi	11 August 2003 (aged 16)	(Nigeria Football Federation) B. Angel FC
16	GK	Daniel Jinadu	21 June 2002 (aged 17)	(The Football Association) West Ham United
17	FW	Divine Nwachukwu	25 May 2003 (aged 16)	(Nigeria Football Federation) Riverline FC
18	FW	Ibraheem Jabaar	24 October 2002 (aged 17)	(Nigeria Football Federation) Riverline FC
19	FW	Abba Bichi	27 December 2003 (aged 15)	(Nigeria Football Federation) Talentbase Sport FC
20	MF	Ibrahim Said	15 June 2002 (aged 17)	(Nigeria Football Federation) Dabo Babes Academy
21	GK	Joseph Oluwabusola	1 January 2003 (aged 16)	(The Football Association) AFC Bournemouth

=== Hungary ===
Hungary announced a squad of 23 players the 10 October 2019, which was reduced to 21 on 16 October.

Head coach: Sandor Preisinger

No.	Pos.	Player	Date of birth (age)	Club
1	GK	Krisztián Hegyi	24 September 2002 (aged 17)	(The Football Association) West Ham United
2	DF	Gábor Buna	24 May 2002 (aged 17)	(Hungarian Football Federation) Honvéd
3	DF	Donát Orosz	28 July 2002 (aged 17)	(Hungarian Football Federation) Diósgyőr
4	MF	Patrik Posztobányi	29 July 2002 (aged 17)	(Hungarian Football Federation) Puskás Akadémia
5	DF	**Botond Balogh**	6 June 2002 (aged 17)	(Italian Football Federation) Parma
6	MF	**Mihály Kata**	13 April 2002 (aged 17)	(Hungarian Football Federation) MTK Budapest
7	FW	Ákos Zuigéber	8 November 2002 (aged 16)	(Hungarian Football Federation) MTK Budapest
8	MF	Sámuel Major	9 January 2002 (aged 17)	(Austrian Football Association) RB Salzburg
9	FW	**András Németh**	9 November 2002 (aged 16)	(Royal Belgian Football Association) Genk
10	MF	Márk Kosznovszky	17 April 2002 (aged 17)	(Italian Football Federation) Parma
11	MF	György Komáromi	19 January 2002 (aged 17)	(Hungarian Football Federation) Puskás Akadémia
12	GK	Gábor Megyeri	16 December 2002 (aged 16)	(Hungarian Football Federation) Honvéd
13	DF	Zétény Hosszú	19 February 2002 (aged 17)	(Hungarian Football Federation) Puskás Akadémia
14	DF	Milán Horváth	30 January 2002 (aged 17)	(Hungarian Football Federation) Honvéd
15	MF	**Péter Baráth**	21 February 2002 (aged 17)	(Hungarian Football Federation) Debrecen
16	MF	Gergő Ominger	25 September 2002 (aged 17)	(Hungarian Football Federation) Puskás Akadémia
17	GK	Marcell Vaits	24 February 2002 (aged 17)	(Hungarian Football Federation) Puskás Akadémia
18	MF	Borisz Tóth	7 July 2002 (aged 17)	(Hungarian Football Federation) Diósgyőr
19	FW	Rajmund Molnár	28 August 2002 (aged 17)	(Portuguese Football Federation) Benfica
20	FW	Csaba Mester	12 August 2002 (aged 17)	(Austrian Football Association) Austria Wien
21	MF	Dávid László	25 April 2002 (aged 17)	(Hungarian Football Federation) Honvéd

=== Ecuador ===
Head coach: Javier Rodríguez Mayorga

No.	Pos.	Player	Date of birth (age)	Club
1	GK	Joan López	11 January 2002 (aged 17)	(Ecuadorian Football Federation) Independiente del Valle
2	DF	Jordan Morán	17 March 2002 (aged 17)	(Ecuadorian Football Federation) LDU Quito
3	DF	**Piero Hincapié**	9 January 2002 (aged 17)	(Ecuadorian Football Federation) Independiente del Valle
4	DF	Hanssel Delgado	7 April 2002 (aged 17)	(Ecuadorian Football Federation) Independiente del Valle
5	MF	**Marco Angulo**	8 May 2002 (aged 17)	(Ecuadorian Football Federation) Independiente del Valle
6	DF	Roberto Cabezas	17 March 2002 (aged 17)	(Ecuadorian Football Federation) Independiente del Valle
7	MF	Jeremy Farfán	26 January 2002 (aged 17)	(Ecuadorian Football Federation) Macará
8	MF	Silvano Estacio	29 April 2002 (aged 17)	(Ecuadorian Football Federation) Emelec
9	FW	Edwin Valencia	23 October 2002 (aged 17)	(Ecuadorian Football Federation) Barcelona
10	FW	Johan Mina	15 May 2002 (aged 17)	(Ecuadorian Football Federation) Emelec
11	FW	Adrián Mejía	28 May 2002 (aged 17)	(Ecuadorian Football Federation) Independiente del Valle
12	GK	Gilmar Napa	5 January 2003 (aged 16)	(Ecuadorian Football Federation) Orense
13	DF	Edwin Rodríguez	8 January 2002 (aged 17)	(Ecuadorian Football Federation) Aucas
14	MF	Erick Plúas	20 March 2002 (aged 17)	(Ecuadorian Football Federation) Orense
15	MF	Patrickson Delgado	17 October 2003 (aged 16)	(Ecuadorian Football Federation) Independiente del Valle
16	DF	Klever Vera	20 March 2002 (aged 17)	(Ecuadorian Football Federation) Delfín
17	MF	**John Mercado**	3 June 2002 (aged 17)	(Ecuadorian Football Federation) Panamá
18	DF	**Jhoanner Chávez**	25 April 2002 (aged 17)	(Ecuadorian Football Federation) Independiente del Valle
19	FW	**Pedro Vite**	9 March 2002 (aged 17)	(Ecuadorian Football Federation) Independiente del Valle
20	DF	Derihan Rivera	11 August 2002 (aged 17)	(Ecuadorian Football Federation) LDU Portoviejo
21	GK	Elías Valencia	10 September 2002 (aged 17)	(Ecuadorian Football Federation) Universidad Católica

=== Australia ===
Australia named their squad on 2 October 2019.

Head coach: Trevor Morgan

No.	Pos.	Player	Date of birth (age)	Club
1	GK	Adam Pavlesic	30 July 2002 (aged 17)	(Football Australia) Sydney FC
2	DF	Idrus Abdulahi	22 September 2003 (aged 16)	(Football Australia) Melbourne City
3	DF	Daniel Walsh	15 October 2002 (aged 17)	(Football Australia) Perth Glory
4	DF	Jordan Courtney-Perkins	6 November 2002 (aged 16)	(Football Australia) Brisbane Roar
5	DF	Izaack Powell	12 February 2002 (aged 17)	(Football Australia) Brisbane Roar
6	MF	**Ryan Teague**	24 January 2002 (aged 17)	(Football Australia) Sydney FC
7	FW	Tristan Hammond	5 January 2003 (aged 16)	(Portuguese Football Federation) Sporting CP
8	MF	Birkan Kirdar	7 February 2002 (aged 17)	(Football Australia) Melbourne Victory
9	FW	Noah Botic	11 January 2002 (aged 17)	(German Football Association) 1899 Hoffenheim
10	MF	Caleb Watts	16 January 2002 (aged 17)	(The Football Association) Southampton
11	FW	Ali Auglah	11 March 2002 (aged 17)	(Football Australia) Western Sydney Wanderers
12	GK	Oliver Kalac	9 November 2002 (aged 16)	(Football Australia) Western Sydney Wanderers
13	DF	Joshua Rawlins	23 April 2004 (aged 15)	(Football Australia) Perth Glory
14	DF	Trent Ostler	3 April 2002 (aged 17)	(Football Australia) Perth Glory
15	DF	Anton Mlinaric	11 March 2002 (aged 17)	(Football Australia) Sydney FC
16	MF	Luke Duzel	5 February 2002 (aged 17)	(Football Australia) Western United
17	FW	Yaya Dukuly	17 January 2003 (aged 16)	(Football Australia) Melbourne City
18	GK	Nicholas Bilokapic	8 September 2002 (aged 17)	(Football Australia) Sydney United
19	FW	Michael Ruhs	27 August 2002 (aged 17)	(Football Australia) Sydney United
20	FW	Luis Lawrie-Lattanzio	20 February 2002 (aged 17)	(Football Australia) Melbourne Victory
21	MF	Cameron Peupion	23 September 2002 (aged 17)	(Football Australia) Sydney FC

== Group C ==
=== South Korea ===
South Korea named their squad on 1 October 2019.

Head coach: Kim Jung-soo

No.	Pos.	Player	Date of birth (age)	Club
1	GK	Shin Song-hun	7 November 2002 (aged 16)	(Korea Football Association) Gwangju FC
2	DF	**Lee Tae-seok**	28 July 2002 (aged 17)	(Korea Football Association) FC Seoul
3	DF	Son Ho-jun	3 July 2002 (aged 17)	(Korea Football Association) Suwon Samsung Bluewings
4	DF	**Lee Han-beom**	17 June 2002 (aged 17)	(Korea Football Association) Boin High School
5	DF	Hong Sung-wook	17 September 2002 (aged 17)	(Korea Football Association) Bukyung High School
6	MF	Yoon Seok-joo	25 February 2002 (aged 17)	(Korea Football Association) Pohang Steelers
7	DF	Kim Yong-hak	20 May 2003 (aged 16)	(Korea Football Association) Pohang Steelers
8	MF	Oh Jae-hyuk	21 June 2002 (aged 17)	(Korea Football Association) Pohang Steelers
9	FW	Choi Min-seo	5 March 2002 (aged 17)	(Korea Football Association) Pohang Steelers
10	FW	Hong Yoon-sang	19 March 2002 (aged 17)	(Korea Football Association) Pohang Steelers
11	FW	**Jeong Sang-bin**	1 April 2002 (aged 17)	(Korea Football Association) Suwon Samsung Bluewings
12	DF	Yu Seung-hyeon	4 June 2003 (aged 16)	(Korea Football Association) Shingal High School
13	DF	Kim Ryun-seong	4 June 2002 (aged 17)	(Korea Football Association) Pohang Steelers
14	DF	Lee Jun-suk	9 March 2002 (aged 17)	(Korea Football Association) Shingal High School
15	DF	Bang Woo-jin	27 February 2002 (aged 17)	(Korea Football Association) FC Seoul
16	FW	**Eom Ji-sung**	9 May 2002 (aged 17)	(Korea Football Association) Gwangju FC
17	MF	Lee Jong-hun	21 March 2002 (aged 17)	(Korea Football Association) Hyunpung High School
18	MF	Moon Jun-ho	21 January 2003 (aged 16)	(Korea Football Association) Daejeon Citizen
19	MF	Paik Sang-hoon	7 January 2002 (aged 17)	(Korea Football Association) FC Seoul
20	GK	Lee Seung-hwan	5 April 2003 (aged 16)	(Korea Football Association) Pohang Steelers
21	GK	Kim Joon-hong	3 May 2003 (aged 16)	(Korea Football Association) Youngsaeng High School

=== Haiti ===
Head coach: (Venezuela) Miguel Perdomo

No.	Pos.	Player	Date of birth (age)	Club
1	GK	Stephner Paul	1 February 2004 (aged 15)	(Haitian Football Federation) Academie Camp Nou
2	DF	Jean Geffrard	25 December 2003 (aged 15)	(Haitian Football Federation) Academie Camp Nou
3	DF	Samuel Jeanty	6 February 2002 (aged 17)	(Haitian Football Federation) Academie Camp Nou
4	MF	Kurowskybob Pierre	28 August 2002 (aged 17)	(United States Soccer Federation) Real Salt Lake
5	DF	Stanley Guirand	15 December 2002 (aged 16)	(Haitian Football Federation) Exafoot
6	DF	Corlens Etienne	24 January 2002 (aged 17)	(Haitian Football Federation) Academie Camp Nou
7	MF	Olsen Aluc	29 December 2002 (aged 16)	(United States Soccer Federation) Lake Grove United
8	MF	Rolph Philippe	14 November 2002 (aged 16)	(Haitian Football Federation) Academie Camp Nou
9	FW	Kervens Jolicoeur	25 August 2002 (aged 17)	(Haitian Football Federation) Academie Camp Nou
10	MF	**Dany Jean**	28 November 2002 (aged 16)	(Haitian Football Federation) Academie Camp Nou
11	MF	**Fredler Christophe**	11 January 2002 (aged 17)	(Haitian Football Federation) Exafoot
12	GK	Judler Delva	10 December 2002 (aged 16)	(Haitian Football Federation) Violette
13	MF	Maudwindo Germain	24 January 2002 (aged 17)	(Haitian Football Federation) Academie Camp Nou
14	DF	Woodbens Ceneus	4 December 2002 (aged 16)	(Haitian Football Federation) Academie Camp Nou
15	FW	Jean-Loubens Pierre	6 July 2002 (aged 17)	(Haitian Football Federation) Academie Camp Nou
16	DF	Jean Lord	23 April 2002 (aged 17)	(Canadian Soccer Association) Chomedey Soccer Club
17	FW	Frantzety Herard	10 March 2002 (aged 17)	(Japan Football Association) Vissel Kobe
18	MF	**Carl Sainte**	9 August 2002 (aged 17)	(Haitian Football Federation) Academie Camp Nou
19	MF	Marvin Sanz	27 August 2002 (aged 17)	Unattached
20	FW	Omre Etienne	26 February 2003 (aged 16)	(United States Soccer Federation) New York Red Bulls
21	GK	Jhon Michel	24 January 2002 (aged 17)	(Haitian Football Federation) Academie Camp Nou

=== France ===
France announced their squad on 7 October 2019.

Head coach: Jean-Claude Giuntini

No.	Pos.	Player	Date of birth (age)	Club
1	GK	Melvin Zinga	16 March 2002 (aged 17)	(French Football Federation) Le Havre
2	DF	Temitope Akinjogunla	24 November 2002 (aged 16)	(French Football Federation) Toulouse
3	DF	Timothée Pembélé	9 September 2002 (aged 17)	(French Football Federation) Paris Saint-Germain
4	DF	Chrislain Matsima	15 May 2002 (aged 17)	(French Football Federation) Monaco
5	DF	Tanguy Nianzou	7 June 2002 (aged 17)	(French Football Federation) Paris Saint-Germain
6	MF	Lucien Agoumé	9 February 2002 (aged 17)	(Italian Football Federation) Inter Milan
7	FW	Arnaud Kalimuendo	20 January 2002 (aged 17)	(French Football Federation) Paris Saint-Germain
8	MF	Enzo Millot	17 July 2002 (aged 17)	(French Football Federation) Monaco
9	FW	Georginio Rutter	20 April 2002 (aged 17)	(French Football Federation) Rennes
10	MF	**Adil Aouchiche**	15 July 2002 (aged 17)	(French Football Federation) Paris Saint-Germain
11	FW	**Nathanaël Mbuku**	16 March 2002 (aged 17)	(French Football Federation) Reims
12	DF	Marvin Tshibuabua	8 January 2002 (aged 17)	(French Football Federation) Saint-Étienne
13	MF	Naouirou Ahamada	5 February 2002 (aged 17)	(Italian Football Federation) Juventus Youth
14	DF	Melih Altıkulaç	8 February 2002 (aged 17)	(French Football Federation) Lyon
15	FW	**Haissem Hassan**	8 February 2002 (aged 17)	(French Football Federation) Châteauroux
16	GK	Amjhad Nazih	18 January 2002 (aged 17)	(French Football Federation) Nîmes
17	MF	Waniss Taïbi	7 March 2002 (aged 17)	(French Football Federation) Angers
18	FW	Isaac Lihadji	10 April 2002 (aged 17)	(French Football Federation) Marseille
19	DF	Brandon Soppy	21 February 2002 (aged 17)	(French Football Federation) Rennes
20	MF	Johann Lepenant	22 October 2002 (aged 17)	(French Football Federation) Caen
21	GK	Darren Lina Semedo	27 April 2002 (aged 17)	(French Football Federation) Bordeaux

=== Chile ===
Head coach: Cristian Leiva

No.	Pos.	Player	Date of birth (age)	Club
1	GK	Julio Fierro	9 April 2002 (aged 17)	(Football Federation of Chile) Colo-Colo
2	DF	David Tati	6 June 2002 (aged 17)	(Football Federation of Chile) Colo-Colo
3	DF	Nicolás Garrido	27 August 2002 (aged 17)	(Football Federation of Chile) Colo-Colo
4	DF	Cristián Riquelme	14 October 2003 (aged 16)	(Football Federation of Chile) Everton
5	DF	**Daniel González**	20 February 2002 (aged 17)	(Football Federation of Chile) Santiago Wanderers
6	MF	**Vicente Pizarro**	5 November 2002 (aged 16)	(Football Federation of Chile) Colo-Colo
7	FW	**Gonzalo Tapia**	18 February 2002 (aged 17)	(Football Federation of Chile) Universidad Católica
8	MF	Danilo Díaz	24 June 2002 (aged 17)	(Football Federation of Chile) Colo-Colo
9	FW	**Alexander Aravena**	6 September 2002 (aged 17)	(Football Federation of Chile) Universidad Católica
10	MF	Joan Cruz	4 April 2003 (aged 16)	(Football Federation of Chile) Colo-Colo
11	FW	Alexander Oroz	15 December 2002 (aged 16)	(Football Federation of Chile) Colo-Colo
12	GK	Diego Carreño	26 April 2002 (aged 17)	(Football Federation of Chile) O'Higgins
13	DF	Bruno Gutiérrez	25 July 2002 (aged 17)	(Football Federation of Chile) Colo-Colo
14	MF	**César Pérez**	29 November 2002 (aged 16)	(Football Federation of Chile) Magallanes
15	DF	Daniel Gutiérrez	16 February 2003 (aged 16)	(Football Federation of Chile) Colo-Colo
16	DF	Patricio Flores	30 January 2002 (aged 17)	(Football Federation of Chile) Universidad Católica
17	FW	César Díaz	31 January 2002 (aged 17)	(Football Federation of Chile) Unión Española
18	FW	Kennan Sepúlveda	8 February 2002 (aged 17)	(Football Federation of Chile) Santiago Wanderers
19	FW	**Lucas Assadi**	8 January 2004 (aged 15)	(Football Federation of Chile) Universidad de Chile
20	MF	Luis Rojas	6 March 2002 (aged 17)	(Football Federation of Chile) Universidad de Chile
21	GK	Vicente Reyes	19 November 2003 (aged 15)	(United States Soccer Federation) Atlanta United FC

== Group D ==
=== United States ===
The United States announced their squad on 11 October 2019.

Head coach: (Switzerland) Raphaël Wicky

No.	Pos.	Player	Date of birth (age)	Club
1	GK	Damian Las	11 April 2002 (aged 17)	(The Football Association) Fulham
2	DF	**Joe Scally**	31 December 2002 (aged 16)	(United States Soccer Federation) New York City FC
3	DF	**George Bello**	22 January 2002 (aged 17)	(United States Soccer Federation) Atlanta United FC
4	DF	Nico Carrera	5 June 2002 (aged 17)	(United States Soccer Federation) FC Dallas
5	DF	Kobe Hernandez-Foster	26 June 2002 (aged 17)	(United States Soccer Federation) LA Galaxy
6	MF	Danny Leyva	5 May 2003 (aged 16)	(United States Soccer Federation) Seattle Sounders FC
7	FW	**Gianluca Busio**	28 May 2002 (aged 17)	(United States Soccer Federation) Sporting Kansas City
8	MF	Bryang Kayo	27 July 2002 (aged 17)	(United States Soccer Federation) Orange County SC
9	FW	**Ricardo Pepi**	9 January 2003 (aged 16)	(United States Soccer Federation) FC Dallas
10	FW	**Giovanni Reyna**	13 November 2002 (aged 16)	(German Football Association) Borussia Dortmund
11	FW	Griffin Yow	25 September 2002 (aged 17)	(United States Soccer Federation) D.C. United
12	GK	Chituru Odunze	14 October 2002 (aged 17)	(The Football Association) Leicester City
13	DF	Adam Armour	27 September 2002 (aged 17)	(United States Soccer Federation) North Carolina FC
14	DF	**Tayvon Gray**	19 August 2002 (aged 17)	(United States Soccer Federation) New York City FC
15	DF	Sebastian Anderson	8 August 2002 (aged 17)	(United States Soccer Federation) Colorado Rapids
16	MF	Adam Saldana	7 February 2002 (aged 17)	(United States Soccer Federation) LA Galaxy
17	MF	Ethan Dobbelaere	14 November 2002 (aged 16)	(United States Soccer Federation) Seattle Sounders FC
18	MF	Maximilian Dietz	9 February 2002 (aged 17)	(German Football Association) SC Freiburg
19	FW	Alfonso Ocampo-Chavez	25 March 2002 (aged 17)	(United States Soccer Federation) Seattle Sounders FC
20	FW	Andres Jasson	17 January 2002 (aged 17)	(United States Soccer Federation) New York City FC
21	GK	Aaron Cervantes	20 March 2002 (aged 17)	(United States Soccer Federation) Orange County SC

=== Senegal ===
Head coach: Malick Daf

Mbaye Ndiaye replaced Dion Lopy before tournament.

No.	Pos.	Player	Date of birth (age)	Club
1	GK	Ousmane Ba	6 June 2002 (aged 17)	(Senegalese Football Federation) Génération Foot
2	DF	Thibaut Aubertin	5 May 2002 (aged 17)	(Senegalese Football Federation) Génération Foot
3	DF	Cheikh Diouf	2 February 2002 (aged 17)	(Senegalese Football Federation) Diambars FC
4	DF	Bacary Sane	24 December 2002 (aged 16)	(Senegalese Football Federation) Diambars FC
5	DF	**Cheikhou Ndiaye**	25 January 2002 (aged 17)	(Senegalese Football Federation) Génération Foot
6	MF	Amete Faye	17 June 2002 (aged 17)	(Senegalese Football Federation) Diambars FC
7	FW	**Aliou Baldé**	12 December 2002 (aged 16)	(Senegalese Football Federation) Diambars FC
8	MF	Boubacar Diallo	15 May 2002 (aged 17)	(Senegalese Football Federation) Diambars FC
9	FW	**Souleymane Faye**	8 February 2003 (aged 16)	(Senegalese Football Federation) Galaxy FA
10	FW	Mouhamadou Diaw	8 March 2002 (aged 17)	(Senegalese Football Federation) Diambars FC
11	FW	**Samba Diallo**	5 January 2003 (aged 16)	(Senegalese Football Federation) AF Darou Salam
12	DF	Birame Diaw	1 May 2003 (aged 16)	(Senegalese Football Federation) Galaxy FA
13	MF	Issaga Kane	11 May 2003 (aged 16)	(Senegalese Football Federation) Galaxy FA
14	MF	Ibrahima Cissoko	18 April 2003 (aged 16)	(Senegalese Football Federation) US Gorée
15	DF	**Mikayil Faye**	14 July 2004 (aged 15)	(Senegalese Football Federation) Diambars FC
16	GK	Aliou Diallo	2 June 2002 (aged 17)	(Senegalese Football Federation) Diambars FC
17	MF	**Mbaye Ndiaye**	21 March 2003 (aged 15)	(Senegalese Football Federation) Sacre Cour
18	MF	**Pape Matar Sarr**	14 September 2002 (aged 17)	(Senegalese Football Federation) Génération Foot
19	MF	Insa Boye	23 March 2002 (aged 17)	(Senegalese Football Federation) Diambars FC
20	MF	Ibrahim Sy	16 December 2002 (aged 16)	(French Football Federation) Reims
21	GK	Pape Dione	20 March 2004 (aged 15)	(Senegalese Football Federation) AF Darou Salam

=== Japan ===
Japan named their squad on 4 October 2019.

Head coach: Yoshiro Moriyama

No.	Pos.	Player	Date of birth (age)	Club
1	GK	**Zion Suzuki**	21 August 2002 (aged 17)	(Japan Football Association) Urawa Red Diamonds
2	DF	Kaito Suzuki	25 August 2002 (aged 17)	(Japan Football Association) Júbilo Iwata
3	DF	Riku Handa	1 January 2002 (aged 17)	(Japan Football Association) Montedio Yamagata
4	DF	Shinya Nakano	17 August 2003 (aged 16)	(Japan Football Association) Sagan Tosu
5	DF	Taiga Hata	20 January 2002 (aged 17)	(Japan Football Association) Ichiritsu Funabashi High School
6	MF	**Joel Chima Fujita**	16 February 2002 (aged 17)	(Japan Football Association) Tokyo Verdy
7	MF	Shunsuke Mito	28 September 2002 (aged 17)	(Japan Football Association) JFA Academy Fukushima
8	MF	Hikaru Naruoka	28 July 2002 (aged 17)	(Japan Football Association) Shimizu S-Pulse
9	MF	Yamato Wakatsuki	18 January 2002 (aged 17)	(Japan Football Association) Shonan Bellmare
10	FW	Jun Nishikawa	21 February 2002 (aged 17)	(Japan Football Association) Cerezo Osaka
11	FW	Shoji Toyama	21 September 2002 (aged 17)	(Japan Football Association) Gamba Osaka
12	GK	Taishi Nozawa	25 December 2002 (aged 16)	(Japan Football Association) FC Tokyo
13	MF	Asahi Yokokawa	26 May 2002 (aged 17)	(Japan Football Association) Shonan Bellmare
14	MF	Keita Nakano	27 August 2002 (aged 17)	(Japan Football Association) Kyoto Sanga
15	DF	Yosuke Murakami	4 February 2002 (aged 17)	(Japan Football Association) Omiya Ardija
16	MF	Kakeru Yamauchi	6 January 2002 (aged 17)	(Japan Football Association) Vissel Kobe
17	MF	Satoshi Tanaka	13 August 2002 (aged 17)	(Japan Football Association) Shonan Bellmare
18	DF	Koshiro Sumi	13 August 2002 (aged 17)	(Japan Football Association) FC Tokyo
19	MF	Soki Tamura	20 April 2002 (aged 17)	(Japan Football Association) Kashiwa Reysol
20	MF	Shuto Mitsuda	25 November 2002 (aged 16)	(Japan Football Association) Nagoya Grampus
21	GK	Masato Sasaki	1 May 2002 (aged 17)	(Japan Football Association) Kashiwa Reysol

=== Netherlands ===
Netherlands announced a squad of 21 players on the 16 October 2019.

Head coach: Peter van der Veen

No.	Pos.	Player	Date of birth (age)	Club
1	GK	Calvin Raatsie	9 February 2002 (aged 17)	(Royal Dutch Football Association) Ajax
2	DF	Ki-Jana Hoever	18 January 2002 (aged 17)	(The Football Association) Liverpool
3	DF	**Melayro Bogarde**	28 May 2002 (aged 17)	(German Football Association) 1899 Hoffenheim
4	DF	**Devyne Rensch**	18 January 2003 (aged 16)	(Royal Dutch Football Association) Ajax
5	DF	**Anass Salah-Eddine**	18 January 2002 (aged 17)	(Royal Dutch Football Association) Ajax
6	MF	**Kenneth Taylor**	16 May 2002 (aged 17)	(Royal Dutch Football Association) Ajax
7	FW	**Sontje Hansen**	18 May 2002 (aged 17)	(Royal Dutch Football Association) Ajax
8	DF	**Ian Maatsen**	10 March 2002 (aged 17)	(The Football Association) Chelsea
9	FW	Naoufal Bannis	11 March 2002 (aged 17)	(Royal Dutch Football Association) Feyenoord
10	MF	Mohamed Taabouni	29 March 2002 (aged 17)	(Royal Dutch Football Association) AZ
11	MF	Naci Ünüvar	13 June 2003 (aged 16)	(Royal Dutch Football Association) Ajax
12	DF	Steven van der Sloot	6 July 2002 (aged 17)	(Royal Dutch Football Association) Ajax
13	MF	Youri Regeer	18 August 2003 (aged 16)	(Royal Dutch Football Association) Ajax
14	MF	Dirk Proper	24 February 2002 (aged 17)	(Royal Dutch Football Association) NEC
15	DF	**Yannick Leliendal**	23 April 2002 (aged 17)	(Royal Belgian Football Association) Genk
16	GK	**Bart Verbruggen**	18 August 2002 (aged 17)	(Royal Dutch Football Association) NAC Breda
17	FW	Jayden Braaf	31 August 2002 (aged 17)	(The Football Association) Manchester City
18	FW	Soulyman Allouch	26 January 2002 (aged 17)	(Royal Dutch Football Association) AZ
19	FW	Romano Postema	7 February 2002 (aged 17)	(Royal Dutch Football Association) FC Groningen
20	FW	**Djenairo Daniels**	7 January 2002 (aged 17)	(Royal Dutch Football Association) PSV Eindhoven
21	GK	Tein Troost	15 January 2002 (aged 17)	(Royal Dutch Football Association) Feyenoord

== Group E ==
=== Spain ===
Spain announced their squad on 9 October 2019.

Head coach: David Gordo

No.	Pos.	Player	Date of birth (age)	Club
1	GK	Iván Martínez	19 February 2002 (aged 17)	(Royal Spanish Football Federation) Osasuna
2	DF	Alejandro Francés	1 August 2002 (aged 17)	(Royal Spanish Football Federation) Zaragoza
3	DF	Javi López	25 March 2002 (aged 17)	(Royal Spanish Football Federation) Alavés
4	DF	Álvaro Carrillo	6 April 2002 (aged 17)	(Royal Spanish Football Federation) Real Madrid
5	DF	José Marsà	4 March 2002 (aged 17)	(Royal Spanish Football Federation) Barcelona
6	MF	Aitor Gelardo	26 June 2002 (aged 17)	(Royal Spanish Football Federation) Villarreal
7	MF	Álex Blesa	15 January 2002 (aged 17)	(Royal Spanish Football Federation) Levante
8	MF	**Beñat Turrientes**	31 January 2002 (aged 17)	(Royal Spanish Football Federation) Real Sociedad
9	FW	Jordi Escobar	10 February 2002 (aged 17)	(Royal Spanish Football Federation) Valencia
10	MF	Germán Valera	16 March 2002 (aged 17)	(Royal Spanish Football Federation) Atlético Madrid
11	FW	Óscar Aranda	29 April 2002 (aged 17)	(Royal Spanish Football Federation) Real Madrid
12	DF	Rafa Marín	19 May 2002 (aged 17)	(Royal Spanish Football Federation) Real Madrid
13	GK	Eric Ruiz	3 November 2002 (aged 16)	(Royal Spanish Football Federation) Real Betis
14	MF	**Ilaix Moriba**	19 January 2003 (aged 16)	(Royal Spanish Football Federation) Barcelona
15	DF	Joseda Menargues	1 May 2002 (aged 17)	(Royal Spanish Football Federation) Valencia
16	DF	Adrián Gómez	2 August 2002 (aged 17)	(Royal Spanish Football Federation) Atlético Madrid
17	MF	David Larrubia	20 April 2002 (aged 17)	(Royal Spanish Football Federation) Málaga
18	FW	**Pedri**	25 November 2002 (aged 16)	(Royal Spanish Football Federation) Las Palmas
19	FW	Pablo Moreno	3 May 2002 (aged 17)	(Italian Football Federation) Juventus
20	MF	Robert Navarro	12 April 2002 (aged 17)	(Royal Spanish Football Federation) Real Sociedad
21	GK	Pere García	22 March 2002 (aged 17)	(Royal Spanish Football Federation) Mallorca

=== Argentina ===
Head coach: Pablo Aimar

No.	Pos.	Player	Date of birth (age)	Club
1	GK	Rocco Ríos Novo	4 June 2002 (aged 17)	(Argentine Football Association) Lanús
2	DF	Alexis Flores	11 January 2002 (aged 17)	(Argentine Football Association) San Lorenzo
3	DF	Bruno Amione	3 January 2002 (aged 17)	(Argentine Football Association) Belgrano
4	DF	Kevin Lomónaco	8 January 2002 (aged 17)	(Argentine Football Association) Lanús
5	MF	David Ayala	26 July 2002 (aged 17)	(Argentine Football Association) Estudiantes de La Plata
6	DF	Lautaro Cano	22 August 2002 (aged 17)	(Argentine Football Association) Vélez
7	FW	Franco Orozco	9 January 2002 (aged 17)	(Argentine Football Association) Lanús
8	MF	Juan Sforza	14 February 2002 (aged 17)	(Argentine Football Association) Newell's Old Boys
9	FW	Matías Godoy	10 January 2002 (aged 17)	(Argentine Football Association) Atlético de Rafaela
10	MF	Matías Palacios	10 May 2002 (aged 17)	(Argentine Football Association) San Lorenzo
11	FW	Exequiel Zeballos	24 April 2002 (aged 17)	(Argentine Football Association) Boca Juniors
12	GK	Federico Losas	28 March 2002 (aged 17)	(Argentine Football Association) Chacarita Juniors
13	GK	Franco Herrera	19 September 2003 (aged 16)	(Argentine Football Association) Newell's Old Boys
14	DF	Tomás Lecanda	29 January 2002 (aged 17)	(Argentine Football Association) River Plate
15	MF	Ignacio Fernández	25 July 2002 (aged 17)	(Argentine Football Association) Boca Juniors
16	MF	Cristian Medina	1 June 2002 (aged 17)	(Argentine Football Association) Boca Juniors
17	FW	Santiago Simón	13 June 2002 (aged 17)	(Argentine Football Association) River Plate
18	FW	Juan Krilanovich	7 April 2002 (aged 17)	(Argentine Football Association) Lanús
19	FW	Lucas Varaldo	24 February 2002 (aged 17)	(Argentine Football Association) Lanús
20	FW	Alan Velasco	27 July 2002 (aged 17)	(Argentine Football Association) Independiente
21	DF	Luciano Vera	9 February 2002 (aged 17)	(Argentine Football Association) River Plate

=== Tajikistan ===
Head coach: Zainidin Rahimov

No.	Pos.	Player	Date of birth (age)	Club
1	GK	**Mukhriddin Khasanov**	23 September 2002 (aged 17)	(Tajikistan Football Federation) Parvoz
2	DF	Jonibek Sharipov	15 January 2002 (aged 17)	(Tajikistan Football Federation) Lokomotive Pamir
3	FW	Parviz Khodzhiev	19 February 2003 (aged 16)	(Tajikistan Football Federation) Lokomotive Pamir
4	DF	Muhammadrasul Litfullaev	9 September 2003 (aged 16)	(Tajikistan Football Federation) Lokomotive Pamir
5	DF	Shahrom Nazarov	21 May 2002 (aged 17)	(Tajikistan Football Federation) Lokomotive Pamir
6	MF	Shuhrat Elmurodov	31 January 2002 (aged 17)	(Tajikistan Football Federation) Lokomotive Pamir
7	MF	Emomali Ahmadkhon	4 May 2002 (aged 17)	(Tajikistan Football Federation) Lokomotive Pamir
8	MF	Nidoyor Zabirov	1 July 2002 (aged 17)	(Tajikistan Football Federation) Lokomotive Pamir
9	FW	**Rustam Soirov**	12 September 2002 (aged 17)	(Tajikistan Football Federation) Lokomotive Pamir
10	FW	**Islom Zoirov**	12 January 2002 (aged 17)	(Tajikistan Football Federation) Lokomotive Pamir
11	DF	Shohrukh Sangov	31 October 2002 (aged 16)	(Tajikistan Football Federation) Lokomotive Pamir
12	DF	Mehrobjon Azimov	20 March 2002 (aged 17)	(Tajikistan Football Federation) Lokomotive Pamir
13	MF	**Amadoni Kamolov**	16 January 2003 (aged 16)	(Tajikistan Football Federation) Lokomotive Pamir
14	MF	Sharifbek Rahmatov	1 September 2002 (aged 17)	(Tajikistan Football Federation) Lokomotive Pamir
15	FW	Sunatullo Ismoilov	28 April 2002 (aged 17)	(Tajikistan Football Federation) Khatlon
16	GK	**Shokhrukh Kirgizboev**	1 May 2002 (aged 17)	(Tajikistan Football Federation) Lokomotive Pamir
17	MF	Umedzhon Kholikov	21 February 2002 (aged 17)	(Tajikistan Football Federation) Lokomotive Pamir
18	FW	Azizbek Khasanov	2 March 2002 (aged 17)	(Tajikistan Football Federation) Lokomotive Pamir
19	GK	Samandar Karimov	12 October 2002 (aged 17)	(Tajikistan Football Federation) Lokomotive Pamir
20	MF	Ozodbek Panzhiev	12 October 2002 (aged 17)	(Tajikistan Football Federation) Lokomotive Pamir
21	DF	Isroil Kholov	27 September 2002 (aged 17)	(Tajikistan Football Federation) Lokomotive Pamir

=== Cameroon ===
Head coach: Thomas Libiih

No.	Pos.	Player	Date of birth (age)	Club
1	GK	Jacques Mbiandjeu	19 October 2002 (aged 17)	(Cameroonian Football Federation) École
2	FW	Aoudou Moussa	2 October 2003 (aged 16)	(Cameroonian Football Federation) Real Academy
3	FW	Ricky Ngatchou	5 January 2002 (aged 17)	(Cameroonian Football Federation) AS Fortuna
4	MF	Daouda Amadou	2 October 2002 (aged 17)	(Cameroonian Football Federation) Oyili FC
5	MF	Francois Bere	9 March 2002 (aged 17)	(Cameroonian Football Federation) Oyili FC
6	MF	Gael Dibongue	5 January 2003 (aged 16)	(Cameroonian Football Federation) AS International
7	MF	Arnold Eba	25 July 2003 (aged 16)	(Cameroonian Football Federation) Eding Sport FC
8	MF	Loïc Etoga	1 April 2003 (aged 16)	(Cameroonian Football Federation) AS International
9	FW	Leonel Wamba	1 September 2002 (aged 17)	(Cameroonian Football Federation) Aigle Royal Menoua
10	FW	**Stève Mvoué**	2 February 2002 (aged 17)	(Cameroonian Football Federation) AS Azur Star
11	DF	Yanick Noah	15 June 2002 (aged 17)	(Cameroonian Football Federation) Sahel FC
12	MF	Toni Nang	4 August 2002 (aged 17)	(Cameroonian Football Federation) AS Ngueng
13	DF	Severin Ze Essono	21 July 2003 (aged 16)	(Cameroonian Football Federation) AS International
14	MF	Nassourou Hamed	20 July 2002 (aged 17)	(Cameroonian Football Federation) AS Dauphine
15	MF	Fabrice Mezama	27 December 2002 (aged 16)	(Cameroonian Football Federation) Fondation Tafi
16	GK	Manfred Ekoi	9 March 2002 (aged 17)	(Cameroonian Football Federation) Best Stars
17	MF	Samuel Nongoh	4 March 2004 (aged 15)	(Cameroonian Football Federation) AS Dauphine
18	DF	Patrice Ngolna	25 August 2002 (aged 17)	(Cameroonian Football Federation) AS Milet
19	FW	Seidou Ismaïla	15 May 2002 (aged 17)	(Cameroonian Football Federation) AS International
20	FW	Marc Medou	14 May 2003 (aged 16)	(Cameroonian Football Federation) APEJES Academy
21	GK	Yvan Tiwa	24 December 2004 (aged 14)	(Cameroonian Football Federation) Fondation Tafi

== Group F ==
=== Solomon Islands ===
Solomon Islands named their squad on 30 September 2019.

Head coach: Stanley Waita

No.	Pos.	Player	Date of birth (age)	Club
1	GK	Davidson Malam	25 November 2002 (aged 16)	(Solomon Islands Football Federation) Laugu United
2	DF	Derrick Taebo	18 August 2002 (aged 17)	(Solomon Islands Football Federation) Henderson Eels
3	DF	Stanford Fakasori	10 October 2002 (aged 17)	(Solomon Islands Football Federation) Solomon Warriors
4	DF	**Leon Kofana**	22 June 2002 (aged 17)	(New Zealand Football) Wellington Phoenix Youth
5	DF	Javin Alick	17 November 2002 (aged 16)	(Solomon Islands Football Federation) Kossa
6	DF	Fresha Sofu	15 July 2002 (aged 17)	(Solomon Islands Football Federation) Renbel
7	FW	Bradley Irosaea	25 April 2003 (aged 16)	(Solomon Islands Football Federation) Solomon Warriors
8	MF	Richie Kwaimamani	6 April 2002 (aged 17)	(Solomon Islands Football Federation) Isabel United
9	FW	Charles Mani	7 February 2002 (aged 17)	(New Zealand Football) Glenfield Rovers
10	FW	**Raphael Lea'i**	9 September 2003 (aged 16)	(New Zealand Football) Wellington Phoenix Youth
11	MF	Philip Ropa	21 October 2002 (aged 17)	(Solomon Islands Football Federation) Solomon Warriors
12	GK	Junior Petua	30 December 2003 (aged 15)	(Solomon Islands Football Federation) Lungga School
13	MF	Alford Kanahanimae	1 October 2002 (aged 17)	(Solomon Islands Football Federation) Real Kakamora
14	MF	Densly Geseni	21 June 2002 (aged 17)	(Solomon Islands Football Federation) Solomon Warriors
15	MF	Alden Suri	7 April 2003 (aged 16)	(Solomon Islands Football Federation) Three United
16	DF	Hensky Foata	3 June 2003 (aged 16)	(Solomon Islands Football Federation) Western Turtles
17	FW	Barrie Limoki	2 March 2004 (aged 15)	(Solomon Islands Football Federation) Kossa
18	DF	Zani Sale	4 May 2003 (aged 16)	(Solomon Islands Football Federation) Western Turtles
19	FW	Selwyn Hou	2 December 2003 (aged 15)	(Solomon Islands Football Federation) Henderson Eels
20	DF	Pateson Tongaka	8 August 2004 (aged 15)	(Solomon Islands Football Federation) Kossa
21	GK	Naomauri Iuta	7 April 2003 (aged 16)	(Solomon Islands Football Federation) Henderson Eels

=== Italy ===
Italy announced its official squad of 21 players on 16 October 2019.

Head coach: * Carmine Nunziata

No.	Pos.	Player	Date of birth (age)	Club
1	GK	Manuel Gasparini	19 May 2002 (aged 17)	(Italian Football Federation) Udinese
2	DF	Francesco Lamanna	11 January 2002 (aged 17)	(Italian Football Federation) Cremonese
3	DF	Matteo Ruggeri	11 July 2002 (aged 17)	(Italian Football Federation) Atalanta
4	MF	Simone Panada	2 June 2002 (aged 17)	(Italian Football Federation) Atalanta
5	DF	Christian Dalle Mura	2 February 2002 (aged 17)	(Italian Football Federation) Fiorentina
6	DF	Lorenzo Pirola	20 February 2002 (aged 17)	(Italian Football Federation) Inter Milan
7	FW	**Wilfried Gnonto**	5 November 2003 (aged 15)	(Italian Football Federation) Inter Milan
8	MF	Michael Brentan	16 April 2002 (aged 17)	(Italian Football Federation) Sampdoria
9	FW	Alessandro Arlotti	2 April 2002 (aged 17)	(French Football Federation) Monaco
10	MF	Franco Tongya	13 March 2002 (aged 17)	(Italian Football Federation) Juventus
11	FW	Nicolò Cudrig	7 August 2002 (aged 17)	(French Football Federation) Monaco
12	GK	Filippo Rinaldi	4 December 2002 (aged 16)	(Italian Football Federation) Parma
13	DF	**Destiny Udogie**	28 November 2002 (aged 16)	(Italian Football Federation) Hellas Verona
14	DF	Tommaso Barbieri	26 August 2002 (aged 17)	(Italian Football Federation) Novara
15	DF	Alessandro Riccio	6 February 2002 (aged 17)	(Italian Football Federation) Juventus
16	DF	Lorenzo Moretti	26 February 2002 (aged 17)	(Italian Football Federation) Inter Milan
17	MF	Samuel Giovane	28 March 2003 (aged 16)	(Italian Football Federation) Atalanta
18	MF	Riccardo Boscolo Chio	6 July 2002 (aged 17)	(Italian Football Federation) Inter Milan
19	MF	Andrea Capone	18 March 2002 (aged 17)	(Italian Football Federation) Milan
20	MF	Gaetano Oristanio	28 September 2002 (aged 17)	(Italian Football Federation) Inter Milan
21	GK	Marco Molla	19 June 2002 (aged 17)	(Italian Football Federation) Bologna

=== Paraguay ===
Head coach: Gustavo Morínigo

No.	Pos.	Player	Date of birth (age)	Club
1	GK	Antonio González	2 January 2002 (aged 17)	(Paraguayan Football Association) Cerro Porteño
2	DF	Santiago Ocampos	22 January 2002 (aged 17)	(Italian Football Federation) Juventus
3	DF	Rodrigo Melgarejo	23 May 2002 (aged 17)	(Paraguayan Football Association) Deportivo Capiatá
4	DF	Gastón Benítez	21 May 2002 (aged 17)	(Paraguayan Football Association) Nacional
5	DF	Rolando Ortiz	19 August 2002 (aged 17)	(Paraguayan Football Association) Olimpia
6	MF	Wilder Viera	4 March 2002 (aged 17)	(Paraguayan Football Association) Cerro Porteño
7	MF	Rodrigo López	29 March 2002 (aged 17)	(Paraguayan Football Association) Libertad
8	MF	Fabrizio Peralta	2 August 2002 (aged 17)	(Paraguayan Football Association) Cerro Porteño
9	FW	Diego Duarte	8 April 2002 (aged 17)	(Paraguayan Football Association) Olimpia
10	MF	Fernando Ovelar	6 January 2004 (aged 15)	(Paraguayan Football Association) Cerro Porteño
11	MF	Junior Noguera	8 May 2002 (aged 17)	(Paraguayan Football Association) Cerro Porteño
12	GK	Ángel González	4 February 2003 (aged 16)	(Paraguayan Football Association) Libertad
13	DF	Basilio Duarte	1 November 2002 (aged 16)	(Paraguayan Football Association) Cerro Porteño
14	DF	Ulises Lezcano	15 January 2002 (aged 17)	(Paraguayan Football Association) Deportivo Capiatá
15	DF	Fabio Barrios	19 September 2002 (aged 17)	(Paraguayan Football Association) Olimpia
16	MF	Júnior Quiñónez	11 February 2002 (aged 17)	(Paraguayan Football Association) Libertad
17	MF	Matías Segovia	4 January 2003 (aged 16)	(Paraguayan Football Association) Guaraní
18	FW	Diego Acosta	12 November 2002 (aged 16)	(Paraguayan Football Association) Libertad
19	FW	Fernando Presentado	28 June 2002 (aged 17)	(Paraguayan Football Association) River Plate
20	MF	Diego Torres	14 October 2002 (aged 17)	(Paraguayan Football Association) Olimpia
21	GK	Diego Aranda	2 March 2002 (aged 17)	(Paraguayan Football Association) Sol de América

=== Mexico ===
Mexico named their squad on 8 October 2019.

Head coach: Marco Antonio Ruiz

No.	Pos.	Player	Date of birth (age)	Club
1	GK	Eduardo García	11 July 2002 (aged 17)	(Mexican Football Federation) Guadalajara
2	DF	**Emilio Lara**	27 March 2002 (aged 17)	(Mexican Football Federation) América
3	DF	**Víctor Guzmán**	7 March 2002 (aged 17)	(Mexican Football Federation) Tijuana
4	DF	**Alejandro Gómez**	31 January 2002 (aged 17)	(Mexican Football Federation) Atlas
5	DF	Rafael Ortega	12 October 2002 (aged 17)	(Mexican Football Federation) Atlas
6	MF	Eugenio Pizzuto	13 May 2002 (aged 17)	(Mexican Football Federation) Pachuca
7	MF	Gustavo Armas	1 June 2002 (aged 17)	(Mexican Football Federation) Atlas
8	MF	Josué Martínez	28 March 2002 (aged 17)	(Mexican Football Federation) Monterrey
9	FW	Santiago Muñoz	14 August 2002 (aged 17)	(Mexican Football Federation) Santos Laguna
10	FW	Israel Luna	23 March 2002 (aged 17)	(Mexican Football Federation) Pachuca
11	MF	**Bryan González**	10 April 2003 (aged 16)	(Mexican Football Federation) Pachuca
12	GK	Arturo Delgado	18 February 2002 (aged 17)	(Mexican Football Federation) UANL
13	DF	José Ruíz	27 March 2002 (aged 17)	(Mexican Football Federation) Guadalajara
14	DF	Gabriel Martínez	24 July 2002 (aged 17)	(Mexican Football Federation) Guadalajara
15	MF	Abraham Flores	14 July 2002 (aged 17)	(Mexican Football Federation) Tijuana
16	MF	Joel Gómez	14 February 2002 (aged 17)	(Mexican Football Federation) Querétaro
17	FW	Luis Puente	23 March 2002 (aged 17)	(Mexican Football Federation) Guadalajara
18	FW	**Efraín Álvarez**	19 June 2002 (aged 17)	(United States Soccer Federation) LA Galaxy
19	FW	Alí Ávila	23 September 2003 (aged 16)	(Mexican Football Federation) Monterrey
20	MF	Bruce El-mesmari	23 April 2002 (aged 17)	(Mexican Football Federation) Pachuca
21	GK	Gerardo Magaña	30 April 2002 (aged 17)	(Mexican Football Federation) Morelia
