= 2019 UEFA European Under-17 Championship squads =

International European football tournament squads

The following is a list of squads for each national team that competed at the 2019 UEFA European Under-17 Championship in Republic of Ireland. Each national team had to submit a squad of 20 players born on or after 1 January 2002.

Players in boldface have been capped at full international level at some point in their career.

All ages are as of 2 May 2019, the day before the start of tournament.

== Group A ==
=== Belgium ===
Head coach: (Belgium) Bob Browaeys

No.	Pos.	Player	Date of birth (age)	Club
1	GK	Maarten Vandevoordt	26 February 2002 (aged 17)	(Royal Belgian Football Association) Genk
2	DF	Yunus Bahadir	7 August 2002 (aged 16)	(Royal Belgian Football Association) Genk
3	DF	**Killian Sardella**	2 May 2002 (aged 17)	(Royal Belgian Football Association) Anderlecht
4	DF	Ibe Hautekiet	13 April 2002 (aged 17)	(Royal Belgian Football Association) Club Brugge
5	DF	Rob Nizet	14 April 2002 (aged 17)	(Royal Belgian Football Association) Anderlecht
6	MF	Marco Kana	8 August 2002 (aged 16)	(Royal Belgian Football Association) Anderlecht
7	MF	Tibo Persyn	13 March 2002 (aged 17)	(Italian Football Federation) Inter Milan
8	MF	Wouter George	3 March 2002 (aged 17)	(Royal Belgian Football Association) Gent
9	MF	François Xavier Engolo	27 November 2002 (aged 16)	(Royal Belgian Football Association) Standard Liège
10	MF	Mathias De Wolf	21 February 2002 (aged 17)	(Royal Belgian Football Association) Club Brugge
11	FW	**Jeremy Doku**	27 May 2002 (aged 16)	(Royal Belgian Football Association) Anderlecht
12	GK	**Senne Lammens**	7 July 2002 (aged 16)	(Royal Belgian Football Association) Club Brugge
13	DF	**Hugo Siquet**	9 July 2002 (aged 16)	(Royal Belgian Football Association) Standard Liège
14	MF	Jérémy Landu	2 January 2002 (aged 17)	(Royal Belgian Football Association) Standard Liège
15	MF	**Ameen Al Dakhil**	6 March 2002 (aged 17)	(Royal Belgian Football Association) Standard Liège
16	MF	Samuel Asoma	15 July 2002 (aged 16)	(Royal Belgian Football Association) Club Brugge
17	MF	Anouar Ait El Hadj	20 April 2002 (aged 17)	(Royal Belgian Football Association) Anderlecht
18	FW	Chris Kalulika	19 February 2002 (aged 17)	(Royal Belgian Football Association) Anderlecht
19	FW	Franck Idumbo-Muzambo	23 June 2002 (aged 16)	(Royal Belgian Football Association) Gent
20	FW	Thibo Baeten	4 June 2002 (aged 16)	(Royal Belgian Football Association) Club Brugge

=== Czech Republic ===
Head coach: (Czech Republic) Václav Kotal

No.	Pos.	Player	Date of birth (age)	Club
1	GK	Adam Stejskal	28 March 2002 (aged 17)	(Austrian Football Association) Red Bull Salzburg
2	MF	Jáchym Šíp	22 January 2003 (aged 16)	(Football Association of the Czech Republic) Sigma Olomouc
3	DF	Jan Hellebrand	2 March 2002 (aged 17)	(Football Association of the Czech Republic) Fastav Zlín
4	DF	Petr Kůrka	4 July 2002 (aged 16)	(Football Association of the Czech Republic) Pardubice
5	MF	Tomáš Hájek	1 May 2002 (aged 17)	(Football Association of the Czech Republic) Slavia Prague
6	MF	Lukáš Hroník	7 January 2002 (aged 17)	(Football Association of the Czech Republic) Slavia Prague
7	FW	David Pech	22 February 2002 (aged 17)	(Football Association of the Czech Republic) Mladá Boleslav
8	FW	Vojtěch Wojatschke	27 January 2002 (aged 17)	(Football Association of the Czech Republic) Baník Ostrava
9	MF	Filip Gedeon	1 August 2002 (aged 16)	(Football Association of the Czech Republic) Sparta Prague
10	MF	Petr Nováček	9 May 2002 (aged 16)	(Football Association of the Czech Republic) Sigma Olomouc
11	FW	Adam Toula	11 February 2002 (aged 17)	(Football Association of the Czech Republic) Slavia Prague
12	DF	Štěpán Starý	26 March 2002 (aged 17)	(Football Association of the Czech Republic) Slavia Prague
13	DF	František Matys	5 August 2002 (aged 16)	(Football Association of the Czech Republic) Slavia Prague
14	MF	Samuel Šimek	12 April 2002 (aged 17)	(Football Association of the Czech Republic) Pardubice
15	DF	Martin Šimek	1 February 2002 (aged 17)	(Football Association of the Czech Republic) Viktoria Plzeň
16	GK	Lukáš Horníček	13 July 2002 (aged 16)	(Football Association of the Czech Republic) Pardubice
17	FW	Filip Šilhart	17 March 2002 (aged 17)	(Football Association of the Czech Republic) Sparta Prague
18	DF	Josef Koželuh	15 February 2002 (aged 17)	(Football Association of the Czech Republic) Viktoria Plzeň
19	FW	Václav Sejk	18 May 2002 (aged 16)	(Football Association of the Czech Republic) Sparta Prague
20	MF	Adam Ritter	16 April 2002 (aged 17)	(Football Association of the Czech Republic) Vysočina Jihlava

=== Greece ===
Head coach: (Greece) Nikolaos Kechagias

No.	Pos.	Player	Date of birth (age)	Club
1	GK	**Konstantinos Tzolakis**	8 November 2002 (aged 16)	(Hellenic Football Federation) Olympiacos
2	DF	Angelos Tsavos	11 April 2002 (aged 17)	(Hellenic Football Federation) Olympiacos
3	DF	Kostas Lazaridis	26 December 2002 (aged 16)	(Hellenic Football Federation) Panathinaikos
4	DF	Kyriakos Aslanidis	11 March 2002 (aged 17)	(Hellenic Football Federation) Olympiacos
5	DF	Panagiotis Panagiotou	16 January 2002 (aged 17)	(Hellenic Football Federation) PAOK
6	MF	Antonis Siatounis	26 August 2002 (aged 16)	(Italian Football Federation) Sampdoria
7	FW	Nektarios Kotopoulos	12 September 2002 (aged 16)	(Hellenic Football Federation) PAOK
8	MF	Thomas Karamperis	29 January 2002 (aged 17)	(Hellenic Football Federation) PAOK
9	FW	**Christos Tzolis**	30 January 2002 (aged 17)	(Hellenic Football Federation) Panetolikos
10	FW	Vasilis Sourlis	16 November 2002 (aged 16)	(Hellenic Football Federation) Olympiacos
11	MF	Giannis Karakoutis	2 February 2003 (aged 16)	(Hellenic Football Federation) PAOK
12	GK	Konstantinos Balomenos	11 March 2002 (aged 17)	(Hellenic Football Federation) PAOK
14	DF	Aventis Aventisian	17 August 2002 (aged 16)	(Hellenic Football Federation) PAOK
15	MF	Pavlos Grosdanis	3 April 2002 (aged 17)	(Hellenic Football Federation) PAS Giannina
16	MF	Vasilis Pavlidis	4 September 2002 (aged 16)	(German Football Association) Schalke 04
17	MF	Vasilis Grosdis	17 January 2002 (aged 17)	(Hellenic Football Federation) PAOK
18	FW	Christos Belevonis	29 July 2002 (aged 16)	(Hellenic Football Federation) Panetolikos
20	DF	Giorgos Manisoglou	18 February 2002 (aged 17)	(Hellenic Football Federation) Xanthi
21	MF	Christos Liatsos	1 September 2003 (aged 15)	(Hellenic Football Federation) Olympiacos
22	MF	Dimitrios Arsenidis	18 February 2002 (aged 17)	(Hellenic Football Federation) Olympiacos

=== Republic of Ireland ===
Head coach: (Republic of Ireland) Colin O'Brien

No.	Pos.	Player	Date of birth (age)	Club
1	GK	**Gavin Bazunu**	20 February 2002 (aged 17)	(The Football Association) Manchester City
2	DF	Sean McEvoy	18 June 2002 (aged 16)	(Irish Football Association) Ballinamallard United
3	DF	James Furlong	7 June 2002 (aged 16)	(Football Association of Ireland) Shamrock Rovers
4	DF	Timi Sobowale	27 January 2002 (aged 17)	(The Football Association) Manchester City
5	DF	**Andrew Omobamidele**	26 March 2002 (aged 17)	(The Football Association) Norwich City
6	MF	**Joe Hodge**	14 September 2002 (aged 16)	(The Football Association) Manchester City
7	FW	Matt Everitt	24 October 2002 (aged 16)	(The Football Association) Brighton & Hove Albion
8	DF	Séamus Keogh	28 February 2002 (aged 17)	(The Football Association) Southampton
9	FW	Conor Carty	25 May 2002 (aged 16)	(The Football Association) Wolverhampton Wanderers
10	MF	Charlie McCann	24 April 2002 (aged 17)	(The Football Association) Manchester United
11	FW	**Festy Ebosele**	2 August 2002 (aged 16)	(The Football Association) Derby County
12	MF	Brandon Holt	25 April 2002 (aged 17)	(Football Association of Ireland) St Patrick's Athletic
14	DF	Anselmo García MacNulty	19 February 2003 (aged 16)	(Royal Spanish Football Federation) Real Betis
15	DF	Luke Turner	20 May 2002 (aged 16)	(Scottish Football Association) Aberdeen
16	GK	Jimmy Corcoran	1 February 2002 (aged 17)	(The Football Association) Preston North End
17	FW	Sean Kennedy	23 July 2002 (aged 16)	(The Football Association) Sunderland
18	MF	Ronan McKinley	21 June 2002 (aged 16)	(Irish Football Association) Derry City
19	MF	Roland Idowu	21 January 2002 (aged 17)	(The Football Association) Southampton
20	FW	Josh Giurgi	18 June 2002 (aged 16)	(The Football Association) Norwich City
23	GK	Harry Halwax	20 March 2002 (aged 17)	(The Football Association) Derby County

== Group B ==
=== England ===
Head coach: (England) Steve Cooper

No.	Pos.	Player	Date of birth (age)	Club
1	GK	Louie Moulden	6 January 2002 (aged 17)	(The Football Association) Manchester City
2	DF	Malachi Fagan-Walcott	11 March 2002 (aged 17)	(The Football Association) Tottenham Hotspur
3	DF	Haydon Roberts	10 May 2002 (aged 16)	(The Football Association) Brighton & Hove Albion
4	MF	Miguel Azeez	20 September 2002 (aged 16)	(The Football Association) Arsenal
5	DF	**Taylor Harwood-Bellis**	30 January 2002 (aged 17)	(The Football Association) Manchester City
6	DF	Teden Mengi	30 April 2002 (aged 17)	(The Football Association) Manchester United
7	MF	**Noni Madueke**	10 March 2002 (aged 17)	(Royal Dutch Football Association) PSV Eindhoven
8	MF	Jensen Weir	31 January 2002 (aged 17)	(The Football Association) Wigan Athletic
9	FW	Sam Greenwood	26 January 2002 (aged 17)	(The Football Association) Arsenal
10	MF	**Yunus Musah**	29 November 2002 (aged 16)	(The Football Association) Arsenal
11	FW	**Morgan Rogers**	26 July 2002 (aged 16)	(The Football Association) West Bromwich Albion
12	MF	Teddy Jenks	12 March 2002 (aged 17)	(The Football Association) Brighton & Hove Albion
13	GK	**James Trafford**	10 October 2002 (aged 16)	(The Football Association) Manchester City
14	FW	Ben Knight	14 June 2002 (aged 16)	(The Football Association) Manchester City
15	DF	Matthew Bondswell	18 April 2002 (aged 17)	(German Football Association) RB Leipzig
16	FW	Joe Gelhardt	4 May 2002 (aged 16)	(The Football Association) Wigan Athletic
17	MF	Lewis Bate	29 October 2002 (aged 16)	(The Football Association) Chelsea
18	FW	**Jeremy Sarmiento**	16 June 2002 (aged 16)	(Portuguese Football Federation) Benfica
19	DF	Samson Robinson	9 January 2002 (aged 17)	(The Football Association) Manchester City
20	MF	**Cole Palmer**	6 May 2002 (aged 16)	(The Football Association) Manchester City

=== France ===
Head coach: (France) Jean-Claude Giuntini

No.	Pos.	Player	Date of birth (age)	Club
1	GK	Amjhad Nazih	18 January 2002 (aged 17)	(French Football Federation) Nîmes
2	DF	Brandon Soppy	21 February 2002 (aged 17)	(French Football Federation) Rennes
3	DF	Timothée Pembele	9 September 2002 (aged 16)	(French Football Federation) Paris Saint-Germain
4	DF	Chrislain Matsima	15 May 2002 (aged 16)	(French Football Federation) Monaco
5	DF	Tanguy Kouassi	7 June 2002 (aged 16)	(French Football Federation) Paris Saint-Germain
6	MF	Lucien Agoume	9 February 2002 (aged 17)	(French Football Federation) Sochaux
7	FW	Amadou Traoré	7 March 2002 (aged 17)	(French Football Federation) Bordeaux
8	MF	Enzo Millot	17 July 2002 (aged 16)	(French Football Federation) Monaco
9	FW	Georginio Rutter	20 April 2002 (aged 17)	(French Football Federation) Rennes
10	MF	Théo Zidane	18 May 2002 (aged 16)	(Royal Spanish Football Federation) Real Madrid
11	FW	Dilane Bakwa	26 August 2002 (aged 16)	(French Football Federation) Bordeaux
12	FW	Isaac Lihadji	10 April 2002 (aged 17)	(French Football Federation) Marseille
13	DF	Melih Altikulac	8 February 2002 (aged 17)	(French Football Federation) Lyon
14	DF	Jean-Claude Ntenda	3 September 2002 (aged 16)	(French Football Federation) Nantes
15	DF	Étienne Youte Kinkoue	14 January 2002 (aged 17)	(French Football Federation) Troyes
16	GK	Melvin Zinga	16 March 2002 (aged 17)	(French Football Federation) Le Havre
17	FW	Kélian Nsona	11 May 2002 (aged 16)	(French Football Federation) Caen
18	MF	**Adil Aouchiche**	15 July 2002 (aged 16)	(French Football Federation) Paris Saint-Germain
19	FW	**Nathanaël Mbuku**	16 March 2002 (aged 17)	(French Football Federation) Reims
20	MF	Johann Lepenant	22 October 2002 (aged 16)	(French Football Federation) Caen

=== Netherlands ===
Head coach: (Netherlands) Peter van der Veen

No.	Pos.	Player	Date of birth (age)	Club
1	GK	Calvin Raatsie	9 February 2002 (aged 17)	(Royal Dutch Football Association) Ajax
2	DF	Ki-Jana Hoever	18 January 2002 (aged 17)	(The Football Association) Liverpool
3	DF	**Melayro Bogarde**	28 May 2002 (aged 16)	(German Football Association) 1899 Hoffenheim
4	DF	**Devyne Rensch**	18 January 2003 (aged 16)	(Royal Dutch Football Association) Ajax
5	MF	**Anass Salah-Eddine**	18 January 2002 (aged 17)	(Royal Dutch Football Association) Ajax
6	MF	**Kenneth Taylor**	16 May 2002 (aged 16)	(Royal Dutch Football Association) Ajax
7	FW	**Sontje Hansen**	18 May 2002 (aged 16)	(Royal Dutch Football Association) Ajax
8	DF	**Ian Maatsen**	10 March 2002 (aged 17)	(The Football Association) Chelsea
9	FW	**Brian Brobbey**	1 February 2002 (aged 17)	(Royal Dutch Football Association) Ajax
10	MF	Mohamed Taabouni	29 March 2002 (aged 17)	(Royal Dutch Football Association) AZ
11	FW	Naci Ünüvar	13 June 2003 (aged 15)	(Royal Dutch Football Association) Ajax
12	DF	Steven van der Sloot	6 July 2002 (aged 16)	(Royal Dutch Football Association) Feyenoord
13	DF	Neraysho Kasanwirjo	18 February 2002 (aged 17)	(Royal Dutch Football Association) Ajax
14	DF	Mohamed Sankoh	16 October 2003 (aged 15)	(The Football Association) Stoke City
15	MF	Dirk Proper	24 February 2002 (aged 17)	(Royal Dutch Football Association) NEC Nijmegen
16	GK	Tein Troost	15 January 2002 (aged 17)	(Royal Dutch Football Association) Feyenoord
17	MF	Syb van Ottele	2 February 2002 (aged 17)	(Royal Dutch Football Association) NEC Nijmegen
18	FW	Soulaïman Allouch	26 January 2002 (aged 17)	(Royal Dutch Football Association) AZ
19	FW	Naoufal Bannis	11 March 2002 (aged 17)	(Royal Dutch Football Association) Feyenoord
20	MF	Joost de Schutter	7 January 2002 (aged 17)	(Royal Dutch Football Association) PSV Eindhoven

=== Sweden ===
Head coach: (Sweden) Christofer Augustsson

No.	Pos.	Player	Date of birth (age)	Club
1	GK	**Oliver Dovin**	11 July 2002 (aged 16)	(Swedish Football Association) Hammarby IF
2	DF	Viktor Widell	25 July 2002 (aged 16)	(Swedish Football Association) Elfsborg
3	DF	Noah Eile	19 July 2002 (aged 16)	(Swedish Football Association) Malmö FF
4	DF	Melvin Bälter	14 March 2002 (aged 17)	(Swedish Football Association) IFK Göteborg
5	DF	Niclas Bergmark	7 January 2002 (aged 17)	(Swedish Football Association) Örebro SK
6	MF	Dennis Collander	9 May 2002 (aged 16)	(Swedish Football Association) Örebro SK
7	MF	Melker Roslin	18 February 2002 (aged 17)	(Swedish Football Association) Malmö FF
8	FW	Tim Prica	23 April 2002 (aged 17)	(Swedish Football Association) Malmö FF
9	MF	**Anthony Elanga**	27 April 2002 (aged 17)	(The Football Association) Manchester United
10	MF	William Milovanovic	6 May 2002 (aged 16)	(Swedish Football Association) Häcken
11	MF	Isak Jansson	31 January 2002 (aged 17)	(Swedish Football Association) Kalmar FF
12	GK	Victor Stulic	17 March 2002 (aged 17)	(Swedish Football Association) Öster
13	MF	David Edvardsson	5 March 2002 (aged 17)	(Swedish Football Association) Malmö FF
14	MF	Aleksander Nilsson	5 September 2002 (aged 16)	(Swedish Football Association) Malmö FF
15	DF	Totte Holmkvist	14 October 2002 (aged 16)	(Swedish Football Association) Trelleborgs FF
16	DF	Taulant Peci	12 August 2002 (aged 16)	(Swedish Football Association) Halmstads BK
17	MF	**Armin Gigovic**	6 April 2002 (aged 17)	(Swedish Football Association) Helsingborgs IF
18	FW	**Sebastian Nanasi**	16 May 2002 (aged 16)	(Swedish Football Association) Malmö FF
19	DF	**Hussein Ali**	1 March 2002 (aged 17)	(Swedish Football Association) Malmö FF
20	MF	Oscar Uddenäs	17 August 2002 (aged 16)	(Swedish Football Association) Malmö FF

== Group C ==
=== Hungary ===
Head coach: (Hungary) Sándor Preisinger

No.	Pos.	Player	Date of birth (age)	Club
1	GK	Krisztián Hegyi	24 September 2002 (aged 16)	(Hungarian Football Federation) Szombathelyi Haladás
2	DF	Gábor Buna	24 May 2002 (aged 16)	(Hungarian Football Federation) Budapest Honvéd
3	DF	Donát Orosz	28 July 2002 (aged 16)	(Hungarian Football Federation) Diósgyőr
4	DF	Patrik Posztobányi	29 July 2002 (aged 16)	(Hungarian Football Federation) Puskás Akadémia
5	DF	**Botond Balogh**	6 June 2002 (aged 16)	(Hungarian Football Federation) MTK Budapest
6	MF	**Mihály Kata**	13 April 2002 (aged 17)	(Hungarian Football Federation) MTK Budapest
7	FW	Ákos Zuigeber	8 November 2002 (aged 16)	(Hungarian Football Federation) MTK Budapest
8	MF	Sámuel Major	9 January 2002 (aged 17)	(Austrian Football Association) Red Bull Salzburg
9	FW	**András Németh**	9 November 2002 (aged 16)	(Royal Belgian Football Association) Genk
10	MF	Márk Kosznovszky	17 April 2002 (aged 17)	(Hungarian Football Federation) MTK Budapest
11	FW	György Komáromi	19 January 2002 (aged 17)	(Hungarian Football Federation) Puskás Akadémia
12	GK	Gábor Megyeri	16 December 2002 (aged 16)	(Hungarian Football Federation) Budapest Honvéd
14	DF	Milán Horváth	30 January 2002 (aged 17)	(Hungarian Football Federation) Budapest Honvéd
15	DF	Zoltán Dávid	27 August 2002 (aged 16)	(Hungarian Football Federation) Békéscsaba
16	MF	Gergő Ominger	25 September 2002 (aged 16)	(Hungarian Football Federation) Puskás Akadémia
17	FW	Rajmund Molnár	28 August 2002 (aged 16)	(Hungarian Football Federation) Budapest Honvéd
19	FW	Benedek Kalmár	4 September 2002 (aged 16)	(Hungarian Football Federation) Puskás Akadémia
20	FW	Szabolcs Szalay	17 February 2002 (aged 17)	(Hungarian Football Federation) Szombathelyi Haladás
21	FW	Dávid László	25 April 2002 (aged 17)	(Hungarian Football Federation) Budapest Honvéd
23	DF	Roland Bekker	5 April 2002 (aged 17)	(German Football Association) Borussia Mönchengladbach

=== Iceland ===
Head coach: (Iceland) Davíð Snorri Jónasson

No.	Pos.	Player	Date of birth (age)	Club
1	GK	Ólafur Kristófer Helgason	24 October 2002 (aged 16)	(Football Association of Iceland) Fylkir
2	DF	Baldur Hannes Stefánsson	11 March 2002 (aged 17)	(Football Association of Iceland) Þróttur
3	DF	**Róbert Orri Þorkelsson**	3 April 2002 (aged 17)	(Football Association of Iceland) Afturelding
4	DF	Oliver Stefánsson	3 August 2002 (aged 16)	(Swedish Football Association) IFK Norrköping
5	DF	Vilhjálmur Yngvi Hjálmarsson	12 February 2002 (aged 17)	(Football Association of Iceland) Fjölnir
6	DF	Jón Gísli Eyland Gíslason	25 February 2002 (aged 17)	(Football Association of Iceland) ÍA
7	FW	Valgeir Valgeirsson	22 September 2002 (aged 16)	(Football Association of Iceland) HK
8	MF	**Ísak Bergmann Jóhannesson**	23 March 2003 (aged 16)	(Swedish Football Association) IFK Norrköping
9	FW	**Andri Lucas Guðjohnsen**	29 January 2002 (aged 17)	(Royal Spanish Football Federation) Real Madrid
10	MF	Davíð Snær Jóhannsson	15 June 2002 (aged 16)	(Football Association of Iceland) Keflavík
11	FW	**Mikael Egill Ellertsson**	11 March 2002 (aged 17)	(Italian Football Federation) SPAL
12	GK	Adam Ingi Benediktsson	28 January 2002 (aged 17)	(Football Association of Iceland) HK
13	GK	Helgi Bergmann Hermannsson	16 March 2002 (aged 17)	(Football Association of Iceland) Keflavík
14	MF	**Hákon Arnar Haraldsson**	10 April 2003 (aged 16)	(Football Association of Iceland) ÍA
15	DF	Elmar Þór Jónsson	10 May 2002 (aged 16)	(Football Association of Iceland) Þór
16	MF	**Andri Fannar Baldursson**	10 January 2002 (aged 17)	(Italian Football Federation) Bologna
17	MF	Orri Hrafn Kjartansson	5 February 2002 (aged 17)	(Royal Dutch Football Association) SC Heerenveen
18	FW	**Danijel Dejan Djuric**	5 January 2003 (aged 16)	(Danish Football Association) Midtjylland
19	FW	**Kristall Máni Ingason**	18 January 2002 (aged 17)	(Danish Football Association) Copenhagen
20	MF	Ólafur Guðmundsson	18 March 2002 (aged 17)	(Football Association of Iceland) Breiðablik

=== Portugal ===
Head coach: (Portugal) Emílio Peixe

No.	Pos.	Player	Date of birth (age)	Club
1	GK	Samuel Soares	15 June 2002 (aged 16)	(Portuguese Football Federation) Benfica
2	DF	Tomás Esteves	3 April 2002 (aged 17)	(Portuguese Football Federation) Porto
3	DF	Eduardo Quaresma	2 March 2002 (aged 17)	(Portuguese Football Federation) Sporting CP
4	DF	Tomás Araújo	16 May 2002 (aged 16)	(Portuguese Football Federation) Benfica
5	DF	Rafael Brito	19 January 2002 (aged 17)	(Portuguese Football Federation) Benfica
6	MF	João Daniel	28 June 2002 (aged 16)	(Portuguese Football Federation) Sporting CP
7	FW	Gerson Sousa	10 May 2002 (aged 16)	(Portuguese Football Federation) Benfica
8	MF	Tiago Ribeiro	14 March 2002 (aged 17)	(French Football Federation) Monaco
9	FW	Fábio Silva	19 July 2002 (aged 16)	(Portuguese Football Federation) Porto
10	MF	Paulo Bernardo	24 January 2002 (aged 17)	(Portuguese Football Federation) Benfica
11	MF	Pedro Brazão	18 February 2002 (aged 17)	(French Football Federation) Nice
12	GK	Diogo Almeida	30 January 2002 (aged 17)	(Portuguese Football Federation) Sporting CP
13	DF	Rodrigo Rêgo	26 March 2002 (aged 17)	(Portuguese Football Federation) Sporting CP
14	DF	Filipe Cruz	19 February 2002 (aged 17)	(Portuguese Football Federation) Benfica
15	MF	**Famana Quizera**	25 April 2002 (aged 17)	(German Football Association) Borussia Mönchengladbach
16	FW	Bruno Tavares	16 April 2002 (aged 17)	(Portuguese Football Federation) Sporting CP
17	FW	Henrique Pereira	15 February 2002 (aged 17)	(Portuguese Football Federation) Benfica
18	FW	Tiago Tomás	16 June 2002 (aged 16)	(Portuguese Football Federation) Sporting CP
19	MF	Gonçalo Batalha	18 February 2002 (aged 17)	(Portuguese Football Federation) Sporting CP
20	MF	Daniel Rodrigues	11 February 2002 (aged 17)	(Portuguese Football Federation) Sporting CP

=== Russia ===
Head coach: (Russia) Dmitri Khomukha

No.	Pos.	Player	Date of birth (age)	Club
1	GK	Aleksandr Alekseev	14 February 2002 (aged 17)	(Russian Football Union) Spartak Moscow
2	DF	Daniil Denisov	21 October 2002 (aged 16)	(Russian Football Union) Zenit Saint Petersburg
3	DF	Lev Ushakhin	21 February 2002 (aged 17)	(Russian Football Union) Lokomotiv Moscow
4	DF	Nikita Kotin	1 September 2002 (aged 16)	(Russian Football Union) Krylia Sovetov Samara
5	MF	Vadim Konyukhov	5 January 2002 (aged 17)	(Russian Football Union) CSKA Moscow
6	MF	Igor Vorobyev	13 January 2002 (aged 17)	(Russian Football Union) Zenit Saint Petersburg
7	MF	Islam-Bek Gubzhokov	25 January 2002 (aged 17)	(Russian Football Union) Krasnodar
8	MF	Daniil Shamkin	22 June 2002 (aged 16)	(Russian Football Union) Zenit Saint Petersburg
9	FW	Egor Shapovalov	9 January 2002 (aged 17)	(Russian Football Union) CSKA Moscow
10	FW	Andrei Savinov	14 May 2002 (aged 16)	(Russian Football Union) CSKA Moscow
11	MF	Kirill Shchetinin	17 January 2002 (aged 17)	(Russian Football Union) Lokomotiv Moscow
12	GK	Ilya Kuptsov	25 January 2002 (aged 17)	(Russian Football Union) Dynamo Moscow
13	MF	Stepan Melnikov	25 April 2002 (aged 17)	(Russian Football Union) Spartak Moscow
14	MF	Aslan Mutaliyev	10 February 2002 (aged 17)	(Russian Football Union) Spartak Moscow
15	DF	Dmitri Kratkov	15 January 2002 (aged 17)	(Russian Football Union) Krasnodar
16	DF	Bogdan Logachyov	19 March 2002 (aged 17)	(Russian Football Union) Krasnodar
17	FW	Ilya Golyatov	6 April 2002 (aged 17)	(Russian Football Union) Spartak Moscow
18	MF	**Tigran Avanesyan**	13 April 2002 (aged 17)	(Russian Football Union) CSKA Moscow
19	DF	Aleksandr Mukhin	29 April 2002 (aged 17)	(Russian Football Union) Lokomotiv Moscow
20	DF	Ivan Shmakov	24 February 2002 (aged 17)	(Russian Football Union) Lokomotiv Moscow

== Group D ==
=== Austria ===
Head coach: (Austria) Manfred Zsak

No.	Pos.	Player	Date of birth (age)	Club
1	GK	Nikolas Polster	7 July 2002 (aged 16)	(Austrian Football Association) Rapid Wien
2	DF	Felix Köchl	31 May 2002 (aged 16)	(Austrian Football Association) Wacker Innsbruck
3	DF	Simon Nelson	3 February 2002 (aged 17)	(Austrian Football Association) Sturm Graz
4	DF	Paul Koller	22 February 2002 (aged 17)	(Austrian Football Association) Admira Wacker Mödling
5	DF	Julian Selmeister	13 January 2002 (aged 17)	(Austrian Football Association) Admira Wacker Mödling
6	MF	Nicolas Zdichynec	28 January 2002 (aged 17)	(Austrian Football Association) Admira Wacker Mödling
7	MF	Josef Pross	12 January 2002 (aged 17)	(Austrian Football Association) Austria Wien
8	MF	Matthias Braunöder	27 March 2002 (aged 17)	(Austrian Football Association) Austria Wien
9	FW	Deniz Pehlivan	28 February 2002 (aged 17)	(Austrian Football Association) Rapid Wien
10	MF	Stefan Radulovic	1 January 2002 (aged 17)	(Austrian Football Association) Austria Wien
11	FW	**Thierno Ballo**	2 January 2002 (aged 17)	(The Football Association) Chelsea
12	MF	Johannes Schriebl	21 April 2002 (aged 17)	(Austrian Football Association) Mattersburg
13	DF	Berkay Dogan	18 May 2002 (aged 16)	(Austrian Football Association) Red Bull Salzburg
15	DF	Benjamin Böckle	17 June 2002 (aged 16)	(Austrian Football Association) Red Bull Salzburg
16	FW	Bernhard Zimmermann	15 February 2002 (aged 17)	(Austrian Football Association) St. Pölten
17	FW	Manuel Polster	23 December 2002 (aged 16)	(Austrian Football Association) St. Pölten
18	MF	Armand Smrcka	19 July 2002 (aged 16)	(Austrian Football Association) Austria Wien
19	MF	Pierre Nagler	9 February 2002 (aged 17)	(Austrian Football Association) LASK
20	DF	Kevin Sostarits	13 March 2002 (aged 17)	(Austrian Football Association) Admira Wacker Mödling
21	GK	Philipp Jorganovic	22 February 2002 (aged 17)	(German Football Association) Werder Bremen

=== Germany ===
Head coach: (Germany) Michael Feichtenbeiner

No.	Pos.	Player	Date of birth (age)	Club
1	GK	Tim Schreiber	24 April 2002 (aged 17)	(German Football Association) RB Leipzig
2	DF	Lasse Rosenboom	19 January 2002 (aged 17)	(German Football Association) Werder Bremen
3	DF	Jannis Lang	12 July 2002 (aged 16)	(German Football Association) VfL Wolfsburg
4	DF	**Marton Dárdai**	12 February 2002 (aged 17)	(German Football Association) Hertha BSC
5	DF	Adrien Koudelka	23 May 2002 (aged 16)	(German Football Association) FC Augsburg
6	MF	Jordan Meyer	26 March 2002 (aged 17)	(German Football Association) VfB Stuttgart
7	MF	Paul Nebel	10 October 2002 (aged 16)	(German Football Association) Mainz 05
8	MF	**Malik Tillman**	28 May 2002 (aged 16)	(German Football Association) Bayern Munich
9	FW	**Nick Woltemade**	14 February 2002 (aged 17)	(German Football Association) Werder Bremen
10	MF	**Lazar Samardzic**	24 February 2002 (aged 17)	(German Football Association) Hertha BSC
11	FW	Marco John	2 April 2002 (aged 17)	(German Football Association) 1899 Hoffenheim
12	GK	Noah Atubolu	25 May 2002 (aged 16)	(German Football Association) SC Freiburg
13	MF	Lars Kehl	8 April 2002 (aged 17)	(German Football Association) SC Freiburg
14	FW	Maximilian Beier	17 October 2002 (aged 16)	(German Football Association) 1899 Hoffenheim
17	MF	Marvin Obuz	25 January 2002 (aged 17)	(German Football Association) 1. FC Köln
18	DF	Kerim Calhanoglu	26 August 2002 (aged 16)	(German Football Association) 1899 Hoffenheim
19	MF	**Karim Adeyemi**	18 January 2002 (aged 17)	(Austrian Football Association) Liefering
20	FW	Marcel Beifus	27 October 2002 (aged 16)	(German Football Association) VfL Wolfsburg
21	DF	Luca Netz	15 May 2003 (aged 15)	(German Football Association) Hertha BSC
22	DF	Mehmet-Can Aydin	9 February 2002 (aged 17)	(German Football Association) Schalke 04

=== Italy ===
Head coach: (Italy) Carmine Nunziata

No.	Pos.	Player	Date of birth (age)	Club
1	GK	Manuel Gasparini	19 May 2002 (aged 16)	(Italian Football Federation) Udinese
2	DF	Francesco Lamanna	11 January 2002 (aged 17)	(Italian Football Federation) Juventus
3	DF	**Matteo Ruggeri**	11 July 2002 (aged 16)	(Italian Football Federation) Atalanta
4	MF	Simone Panada	2 June 2002 (aged 16)	(Italian Football Federation) Atalanta
5	DF	Lorenzo Moretti	26 February 2002 (aged 17)	(Italian Football Federation) Inter Milan
6	DF	Lorenzo Pirola	20 February 2002 (aged 17)	(Italian Football Federation) Inter Milan
7	MF	Franco Tongya	13 March 2002 (aged 17)	(Italian Football Federation) Juventus
8	MF	Nikola Sekulov	18 February 2002 (aged 17)	(Italian Football Federation) Juventus
9	FW	Lorenzo Colombo	8 March 2002 (aged 17)	(Italian Football Federation) Milan
10	FW	**Sebastiano Esposito**	2 July 2002 (aged 16)	(Italian Football Federation) Inter Milan
11	FW	Nicolò Cudrig	7 August 2002 (aged 16)	(Royal Belgian Football Association) Cercle Brugge
12	GK	Marco Molla	19 June 2002 (aged 16)	(Italian Football Federation) Bologna
13	DF	**Destiny Udogie**	28 November 2002 (aged 16)	(Italian Football Federation) Hellas Verona
14	MF	Michael Brentan	16 April 2002 (aged 17)	(Italian Football Federation) Juventus
15	DF	Christian Dalle Mura	2 February 2002 (aged 17)	(Italian Football Federation) Fiorentina
16	MF	Niccolò Squizzato	7 January 2002 (aged 17)	(Italian Football Federation) Inter Milan
17	DF	Alessandro Pio Riccio	6 February 2002 (aged 17)	(Italian Football Federation) Juventus
18	FW	Nicholas Bonfanti	28 March 2002 (aged 17)	(Italian Football Federation) Inter Milan
19	MF	Alessandro Arlotti	2 April 2002 (aged 17)	(French Football Federation) Monaco
20	MF	Samuel Giovane	28 March 2003 (aged 16)	(Italian Football Federation) Atalanta

=== Spain ===
Head coach: (Spain) David Gordo

No.	Pos.	Player	Date of birth (age)	Club
1	GK	Iván Martínez	19 February 2002 (aged 17)	(Royal Spanish Football Federation) Osasuna
2	DF	David López-Guerrero	6 July 2002 (aged 16)	(Royal Spanish Football Federation) Atlético Madrid
3	DF	Javier López	25 March 2002 (aged 17)	(Royal Spanish Football Federation) Alavés
4	DF	Rafael Marín	19 May 2002 (aged 16)	(Royal Spanish Football Federation) Real Madrid
5	DF	Álvaro Carrillo	6 April 2002 (aged 17)	(Royal Spanish Football Federation) Real Madrid
6	MF	Aitor Gelardo	26 June 2002 (aged 16)	(Royal Spanish Football Federation) Roda
7	FW	**Yeremy Pino**	20 October 2002 (aged 16)	(Royal Spanish Football Federation) Roda
8	MF	Beñat Turrientes	31 January 2002 (aged 17)	(Royal Spanish Football Federation) Real Sociedad
9	FW	Jordi Escobar	10 February 2002 (aged 17)	(Royal Spanish Football Federation) Valencia
10	FW	Germán Valera	16 March 2002 (aged 17)	(Royal Spanish Football Federation) Atlético Madrid
11	FW	Mario Soriano	22 April 2002 (aged 17)	(Royal Spanish Football Federation) Atlético Madrid
12	DF	Iván Muñoz	27 February 2002 (aged 17)	(Royal Spanish Football Federation) Valencia
13	GK	Eric Velasquez	3 November 2002 (aged 16)	(Royal Spanish Football Federation) Calavera
14	MF	Álex Rico	25 January 2002 (aged 17)	(Royal Spanish Football Federation) Barcelona
15	DF	Joseda	1 May 2002 (aged 17)	(Royal Spanish Football Federation) Valencia
16	DF	Adrián Gómez	2 August 2002 (aged 16)	(Royal Spanish Football Federation) Atlético Madrid
17	MF	Antonio Pacheco Ruiz	3 January 2002 (aged 17)	(Royal Spanish Football Federation) Roda
18	MF	Óscar Aranda Subiela	29 April 2002 (aged 17)	(Royal Spanish Football Federation) Real Madrid
19	FW	Pablo Moreno	3 May 2002 (aged 16)	(Italian Football Federation) Juventus
20	MF	Roberto Navarro	12 April 2002 (aged 17)	(French Football Federation) Monaco
