= Pedro Banga =

Angolan footballer (2003–2023)

Personal information
- Date of birth: 14 July 2003
- Place of birth: Cabinda, Angola
- Date of death: 31 December 2023 (aged 20)
- Place of death: Luanda, Angola
- Height: 1.76 m (5 ft 9 in)
- Position: Midfielder

Youth career
- –2019: A.F.A.
- 2019–2022: Mamelodi Sundowns
- 2022–2023: Marítimo

Senior career*
| Years | Team | Apps | (Gls) |
| 2022–2023 | Marítimo U23 | 15 | (0) |
| 2023 | Marítimo B | 16 | (0) |

International career
| 2019 | Angola U17 | 2 | (0) |
- * Club domestic league appearances and goals

Pedro Banga (14 July 2003 – 31 December 2023) was an Angolan footballer who played as a midfielder.

== Club career ==
Banga started his youth career at the Academia de Futebol de Angola, before joining the academy of Mamelodi Sundowns in 2019. In September 2022, he signed for Portuguese club Marítimo, where he played 15 matches for the club's under-23 team in the 2022–23 season. After the under-23 team folded at the end of the season, he began playing for Marítimo's B team, making 16 appearances.

== International career ==
In 2019, he represented the Angola under-17 national team at the 2019 FIFA U-17 World Cup in Brazil, where he made two appearances in the group stage against New Zealand and Brazil.

== Death ==
In December 2023, Banga travelled to his hometown of Luanda for both Christmas and New Years. On 31 December, while playing in a football match there, he collapsed on the field due to a cardiac arrest. He was taken to the nearby Hospital Do Prenda, where he died shortly after, at the age of 20.

The week after his death, his Marítimo B teammates paid tribute to him in their next match, a 1–1 draw against AD Camacha in the 2023–24 Campeonato de Portugal.
