= Abraham Flores =

Mexican footballer (born 2002)

Personal information
- Full name: Abraham Flores Cruz
- Date of birth: 14 July 2002 (age 24)
- Place of birth: Tijuana, Baja California, Mexico
- Height: 1.72 m (5 ft 8 in)
- Position: Centre-back

Team information
- Current team: Sinaloa (on loan from Tijuana)
- Number: 5

Youth career
- 2017–2022: Tijuana

Senior career*
Years	Team	Apps	(Gls)
2022–	Tijuana	4	(0)
2024–	→ Sinaloa (loan)	19	(0)

International career^{‡}
2019	Mexico U17	4	(0)
Medal record
Men's football
Representing Mexico
FIFA U-17 World Cup
Runner-up	2019 Brazil	Team
CONCACAF U-17 Championship
Winner	2019 United States
- * Club domestic league appearances and goals as of 29 March 2025 ‡ National team caps and goals as of 25 September 2022

Abraham Flores Cruz (born 14 July 2002) is a Mexican professional footballer who plays as a centre-back for Liga de Expansión MX club Sinaloa, on loan from Liga MX club Tijuana.

== Career statistics ==
=== Club ===
As of 7 July 2023

Club	Season	League			Cup		Continental		Other		Total	
Club	Season	Division	Apps	Goals	Apps	Goals	Apps	Goals	Apps	Goals	Apps	Goals
Tijuana	2022–23	Liga MX	3	0	—		—		—		3	0
Tijuana	2023–24	Liga MX	1	0	—		—		—		1	0
Career total			4	0	0	0	0	0	0	0	4	0

== Honours ==
Mexico U17

- CONCACAF U-17 Championship: 2019
- FIFA U-17 World Cup runner-up: 2019
