= Filippo Rinaldi (footballer) =

Italian footballer (born 2005)

Personal information
- Date of birth: 4 December 2002 (age 23)
- Place of birth: Montecchio Emilia, Italy
- Height: 1.88 m (6 ft 2 in)
- Position: Goalkeeper

Team information
- Current team: Catania (on loan from Parma)
- Number: 1

Youth career
- Celtic Boys Pratina
- 2016–2020: Parma

Senior career*
Years	Team	Apps	(Gls)
2020–	Parma	1	(0)
2021–2022	→ Montevarchi (loan)	8	(0)
2022–2023	→ Piacenza (loan)	20	(0)
2023–2024	→ Olbia (loan)	34	(0)
2024–2025	→ Feralpisalò (loan)	31	(0)
2026–	→ Catania (loan)	0	(0)

International career^{‡}
2019	Italy U17	1	(0)
2019–2020	Italy U18	4	(0)
2021	Italy U21	2	(0)
- * Club domestic league appearances and goals as of 24 May 2026 ‡ National team caps and goals as of 14:41, 16 March 2026 (UTC)

Filippo Rinaldi (born 4 December 2002) is an Italian professional footballer who plays as a goalkeeper for Serie C Group C club Catania, on loan from Parma.

== Club career ==
On 20 October 2020, Rinaldi signed his first professional contract with Parma for 3 seasons, which would automatically extend for 2 more seasons until 2025 when he turned 18. On 1 August 2021, he joined Montevarchi on loan in Serie C. On 9 July 2022, he moved to Piacenza on another year-long loan. The following season, on 23 August 2023, he went on another loan to Olbia. On 10 August 2024, he went on a fourth consecutive loan to Serie C, this time with Feralpisalò for another season.

On 1 June 2025, he returned to Parma and extended his contract until 2029. On 14 January 2026, he debuted with Parma in a 0–0 Serie A tie with Napoli. That remained his only first-team appearance in the 2025–26 season. On 23 July 2026, Rinaldi moved on yet another Serie C loan, joining Catania for a season, with an option to buy.

== International career ==
Rinaldi was called up to the Italy U17s for the 2019 FIFA U-17 World Cup. In October 2021, he was called up to the Italy U21s for a friendly tournament.
