= Konstantinos Balomenos =

Greek footballer (born 2002)

Personal information
- Date of birth: 11 March 2002 (age 24)
- Place of birth: Kilkis, Greece
- Height: 1.87 m (6 ft 2 in)
- Position: Goalkeeper

Team information
- Current team: PAOK
- Number: 54

Youth career
- 2011–2021: PAOK

Senior career*
Years	Team	Apps	(Gls)
2021–	PAOK B	38	(0)
2025–2026	→ Anagennisi Karditsa (loan)	22	(0)

International career^{‡}
2022–2024	Greece U21	5	(0)
- * Club domestic league appearances and goals as of 24 June 2026 ‡ National team caps and goals as of 15 October 2024

Konstantinos Balomenos (Greek: Κωνσταντίνος Μπαλωμένος; born 11 March 2002) is a Greek professional footballer who plays as a goalkeeper for Super League 2 club Anagennisi Karditsa, on loan from PAOK.

== Career statistics ==
As of 16 October 2026

Club	Season	League			Cup		Continental		Other		Total	
Club	Season	Division	Apps	Goals	Apps	Goals	Apps	Goals	Apps	Goals	Apps	Goals
PAOK B	2021–22	Superleague Greece 2	6	0	—		—		—		6	0
PAOK B	2022–23	Superleague Greece 2	13	0	—		—		—		13	0
PAOK B	2023–24	Superleague Greece 2	9	0	—		—		—		9	0
PAOK B	2024–25	Superleague Greece 2	10	0	—		—		—		10	0
PAOK B	Total		38	0	—		—		—		38	0
Anagennisi Karditsa (loan)	2025–26	Superleague Greece 2	22	0	0	0	—		—		22	0
Career total			60	0	0	0	0	0	0	0	60	0
