= João Daniel =

Portuguese missionary (1722–1776)

- Born: 24 July 1722; Travaçós, Diocese of Viseu
- Died: 19 January 1776 (aged 53); Fort of São Julião da Barra
- Occupation: Jesuit missionary
- Years active: 1739–1757
- Notable work: Tesouro descoberto no máximo rio Amazonas

João Daniel (24 July 1722 – 19 January 1776) was a Portuguese missionary, historian, and physiographer.

== Biography ==
João Daniel was born on 24 July 1722, in Travaçós, Diocese of Viseu. Daniel was the son of Manuel Francisco Canário and his wife Maria (or Maria Daniel). He joined the Society of Jesus in Lisbon on 17 December 1739, and embarked for the State of Grão-Pará and Maranhão in 1741. After completing his studies, including physics, he became a missionary in Cumaru and made his solemn profession at the Ibirajuba estate on 20 November 1757. However, just eight days later, despite being destined to become the chronicler of his vice-province, Daniel was exiled from Pará and sent back to Portugal by the governor and the bishop. The reason for this was a comment he had made a few months earlier: "Annas and Caiaphas did as they pleased, while Christ's apostles slept". He was confined in Cárquere and, two years later, in Almeida and São Julião da Barra. While imprisoned, he wrote a book to serve as "honest entertainment in such misery". João Daniel died on 19 January 1776.

== Tesouro descoberto no máximo rio Amazonas ==
Written while João Daniel was in prison, it is a comprehensive treatise in Portuguese, in six parts, namely,

1. "Descrição geográfico-histórica do rio Amazonas";
2. "Notícia geral dos índios seus naturais e de algumas nações em particular";
3. "Notícia da muita riqueza das suas minas, dos seus muitos e preciosos haveres e da muita fertilidade das suas margens";
4. "Da praxe da agricultura e usos dos naturais índios";
5. "Novo e fácil método da sua agricultura; o meio mais útil para extrair suas riquezas e o modo mais breve para desfrutar os seus haveres; para mais breve e mais facilmente se efetuar a sua povoação e comércio"; and
6. "Inventos de mecânica e hidráulica".

The first five parts are in manuscript form at the National Library of Rio de Janeiro, while the sixth is at the Évora Library. This sixth part was sent by Daniel to his brother, the father of librarian Frei Gregório, a member of the Third Order, who gave it to his master, Cenáculo, the Archbishop of Évora. Cenáculo, in turn, donated it to the Évora Library.

== See also ==
- Suppression of the Society of Jesus

== Bibliography ==
- Leite, Serafim (1949). História da Companhia de Jesus no Brasil [History of the Company of Jesus in Brazil] (in Portuguese). Vol. VIII. Rio de Janeiro: Instituto Nacional do Livro.
