= Csaba Mester =

Hungarian association football player

Personal information
- Full name: Csaba Mester
- Date of birth: 12 August 2002 (age 24)
- Height: 1.77 m (5 ft 10 in)
- Position: Forward

Team information
- Current team: FC Marchfeld Donauauen
- Number: 11

Youth career
- –2015: Győr
- 2015–2016: FV Austria XIII
- 2016–2018: Red Bull Salzburg
- 2018–: Austria Wien

Senior career*
Years	Team	Apps	(Gls)
2018–2021	Austria Wien	0	(0)
2018–2023	Austria Wien II	75	(10)
2024–2025	SV Oberwart	34	(11)
2025–	FC Marchfeld Donauauen	27	(18)

International career
2017–2018	Hungary U16	4	(2)
2018–2019	Hungary U17	5	(0)
- * Club domestic league appearances and goals as of 28 June 2026

Csaba Mester (born 12 August 2002) is a Hungarian footballer who currently plays as a forward for FC Marchfeld Donauauen. He was part of the Hungarian U-17 team at the 2019 FIFA U-17 World Cup,

== Career statistics ==
As of 15 December 2019

Club	Season	League			Cup		Other		Total	
Club	Season	Division	Apps	Goals	Apps	Goals	Apps	Goals	Apps	Goals
Austria Wien	2018–19	2. Liga	3	2	0	0	0	0	3	2
Austria Wien	2019–20	2. Liga	4	1	0	0	0	0	4	1
Career total			7	3	0	0	0	0	7	3
