= Nektarios Kotopoulos =

Greek footballer

Personal information
- Full name: Nektarios Kotopoulos
- Date of birth: 12 September 2002 (age 24)
- Place of birth: Xanthi, Greece
- Height: 1.81 m (5 ft 11 in)
- Position: Forward

Youth career
- Xanthi

Senior career*
Years	Team	Apps	(Gls)
2020–	Xanthi	3	(0)
2021	→ Ierapetra (loan)	2	(1)

International career^{‡}
2019	Greece U17	7	(0)
- * Club domestic league appearances and goals as of 28 November 2021 ‡ National team caps and goals as of 9 May 2019

Nektarios Kotopoulos (Greek: Νεκτάριος Κοτόπουλος; born 12 September 2002) is a Greek professional footballer who plays as a forward.
