= Nicolas Zdichynec =

Austrian association footballer

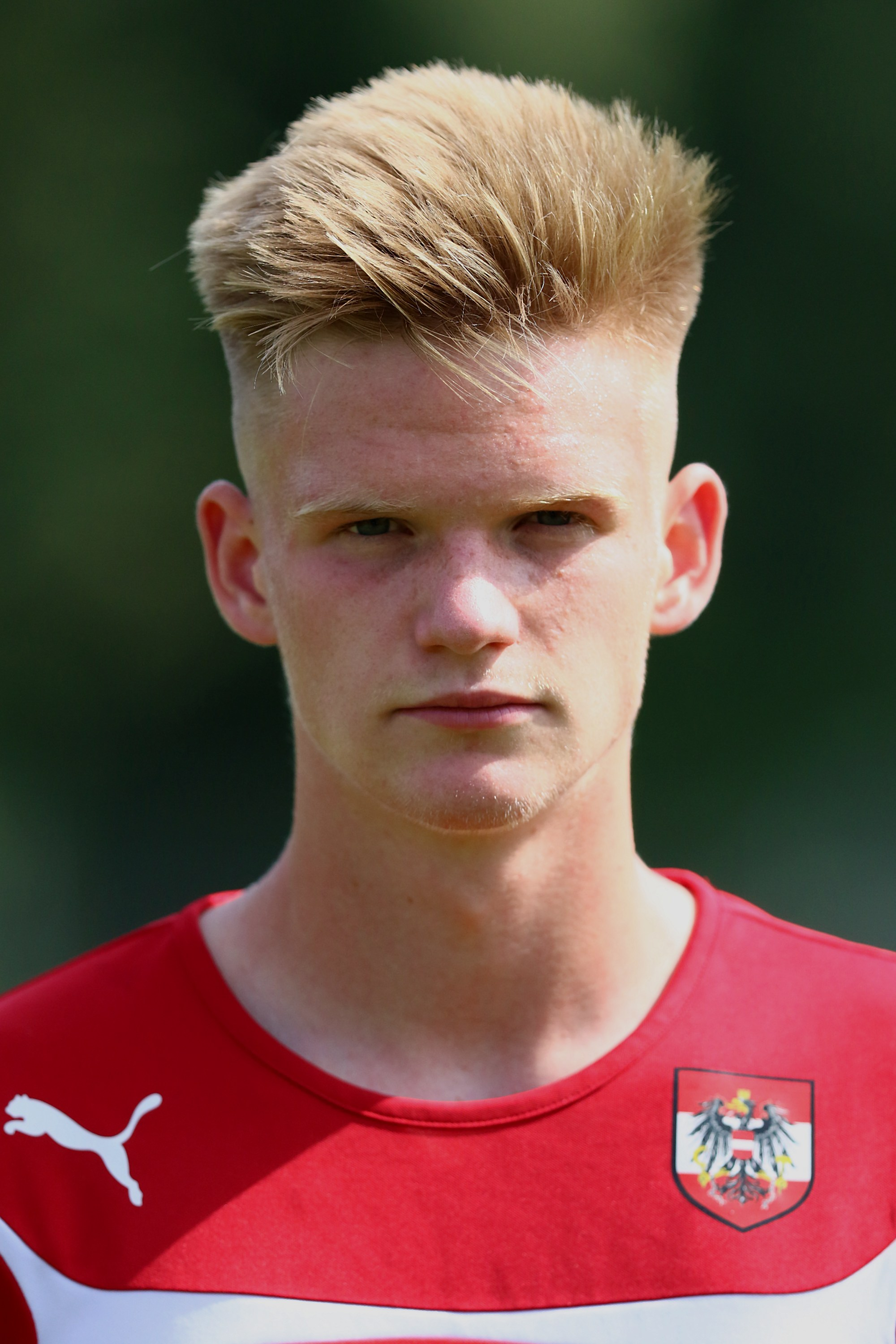
- Zdichynec in 2018

Personal information
- Date of birth: 22 January 2002 (age 24)
- Place of birth: Vienna, Austria
- Height: 1.86 m (6 ft 1 in)
- Position: Midfielder

Team information
- Current team: Young Violets
- Number: 26

Youth career
- 2006–2010: Ebreichsdorf
- 2010–2018: Admira Wacker

Senior career*
Years	Team	Apps	(Gls)
2018–2020	Admira Wacker II	20	(0)
2021	Admira Wacker	1	(0)
2021–2022	Ried II	18	(1)
2022–2023	Ried	0	(0)
2022–2023	→ Vorwärts Steyr (loan)	21	(0)
2023–2024	Traiskirchen	28	(2)
2024–2025	Admira Wacker	0	(0)
2025	→ Traiskirchen (loan)	14	(0)
2025–	Young Violets	7	(0)

International career^{‡}
2017	Austria U15	7	(0)
2021	Austria U16	4	(1)
2021	Austria U17	13	(0)
2021	Austria U18	4	(0)
- * Club domestic league appearances and goals as of 17 May 2026 ‡ National team caps and goals as of 18:46, 4 July 2022 (UTC)

Nicolas Zdichynec (born 22 January 2002) is an Austrian professional footballer who plays as a midfielder for Young Violets.

== Career ==
Zdichynec is a product of the youth academies of Ebreichsdorf and Ried. In 2018, he was promoted to the reserves of Admira Wacker, and then their senior team in 2021 where he made his professional appearance in the last game of the 2020–2021 season against Altach. On 9 June 2021, he transferred to Ried, initially playing with their reserves. He joined Vorwärts Steyr for the 2022–23 season in the 2. Liga on 13 June 2022.

== International career ==
Zdichynec is a youth international for Austria, having represented them from U15 to U18 levels.
