= Franco Herrera =

Argentine footballer

Personal information
- Date of birth: 19 September 2003 (age 23)
- Place of birth: Bandera, Argentina
- Height: 1.90 m (6 ft 3 in)
- Position: Goalkeeper

Team information
- Current team: Arsenal Sarandí

Youth career
- –2022: Newell's Old Boys

Senior career*
Years	Team	Apps	(Gls)
2022–2024	Newell's Old Boys	5	(0)
2023	→ Barracas Central (loan)	0	(0)
2024	→ San Martín de Tucumán (loan)	1	(0)
2025–	Arsenal Sarandí	3	(0)

International career^{‡}
2019	Argentina U16	1	(0)
2023	Argentina U20	2	(0)
- * Club domestic league appearances and goals as of 17:22, 29 December 2025 (UTC) ‡ National team caps and goals as of 13:14, 09 May 2023 (UTC)

Franco Herrera (born 19 September 2003) is an Argentine footballer who plays as a goalkeeper for Arsenal Sarandí.

== Early life ==
Herrera played more basketball than football as a youngster until he joined the academy at Newells.

== Club career ==
Herrera made his senior league debut in April 2022 for Newell's Old Boys, keeping a clean sheet in a 1–0 win against Club Atlético Patronato. He also received praise for his performance in a 0–0 draw with Racing Club at the Estadio Marcelo Bielsa a week later. In February 2023 he joined Barracas Central on loan.

== International career ==
In 2019 Herrera played for the Argentina under-16 team which won a UEFA development tournament in Portugal. He was named in the Argentina under-20 squad by Javier Mascherano for the 2023 South American U-20 Championship held in Colombia in January and February 2023.
