= Amjhad Nazih =

Moroccan footballer (born 2002)

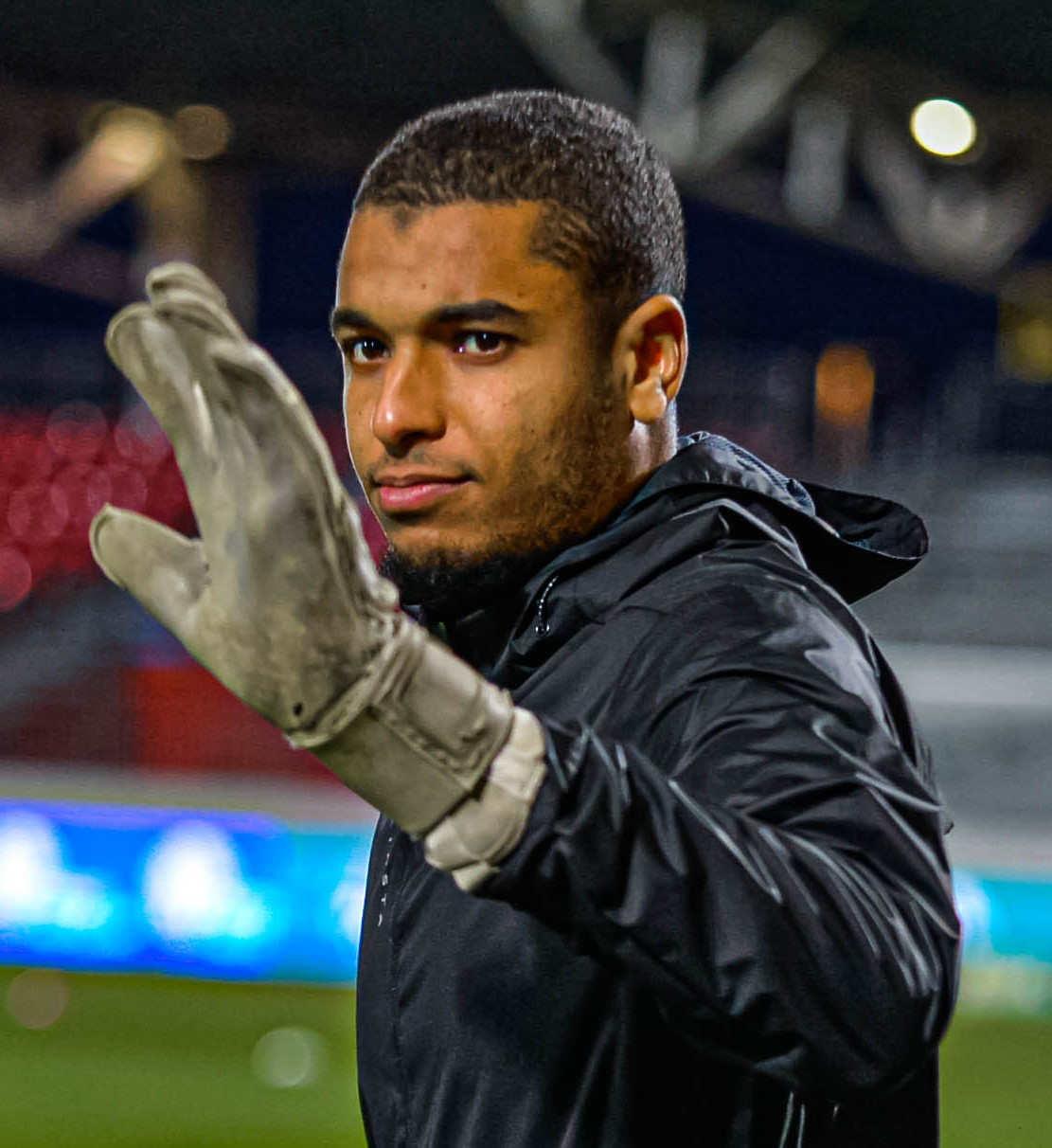
- Nazih in 2023

Personal information
- Full name: Amjhad Nazih
- Date of birth: 18 January 2002 (age 24)
- Place of birth: Sète, France
- Height: 1.92 m (6 ft 4 in)
- Position: Goalkeeper

Youth career
- 2009–2017: Sète 34
- 2017–2020: Nîmes

Senior career*
Years	Team	Apps	(Gls)
2019–2024	Nîmes II	17	(0)
2020–2024	Nîmes	1	(0)
2024–2025	Laval	0	(0)
2024–2025	Laval B	22	(0)

International career^{‡}
2019	France U17	5	(0)
2019	France U18	1	(0)
2023–	Morocco U23	1	(0)
Medal record
Men's football
Representing France
UEFA European Under-17 Championship
Bronze medal – third place	2019 Ireland
- * Club domestic league appearances and goals as of 11 May 2025 ‡ National team caps and goals as of 07:20, 31 March 2023 (UTC)

Amjhad Nazih (born 18 January 2002) is a professional footballer who plays as a goalkeeper. Born in France, he plays for the Morocco under-23 national team.

== Club career ==
Amjhad Nazih made his professional debut for Nîmes on the 10 February 2021, starting as a goalkeeper against Nice in Coupe de France.

== International career ==
Born in France, Nazih was born to a Moroccan father and Algerian mother. He is a youth international with France, taking part to the FIFA U-17 World Cup in 2019, were the French ended third.

Nazih also took part in a training session with Morocco's youth team. He was called up to the Morocco U23s in March 2023.
