= Alessandro Arlotti =

Italian footballer (born 2001)

Personal information
- Date of birth: April 2, 2002 (age 24)

Team information
- Current team: Harvard Crimson

College career
Years	Team	Apps	(Gls)
2021–2023	Harvard Crimson	50	(20)

International career
2019	Italy U19		

Alessandro Arlotti (born 2 April 2002) is a footballer who plays as a striker for Harvard Crimson. Born in France, he was an Italy youth international.

== Early life ==
Arlotti started football at the age of 4 at the La Turbie club.

== Club career ==
Arlotti joined the youth academy of Monaco at the age of 7, where he would be considered a "top student" at Monaco's educational system within their stadium. He then became captain of the Under 17 team. In 2020, he signed for Italian club Pescara.

== College career ==
In 2021, he joined Harvard Crimson in the United States.

== International career ==
Arlotti represented Italy at the 2019 FIFA U-17 World Cup.

== Style of play ==
Arlotti can operate as a striker or second striker.

== Personal life ==
Arlotti is the brother of footballer Gianluca Arlotti.
