= Academia de Futebol de Angola =

Angolan youth academy

- Founded: 28 August 2013; 13 years ago
- Website: https://afa.co.ao/
Home colours

Academia de Futebol de Angola or A.F.A. is an Angolan youth academy in Luanda, Angola.

A.F.A. has been sponsored by former Angolan president José Eduardo dos Santos and was founded on his 67th anniversary.

A.F.A. has been competing in all official provincial and national infant, youth and junior competitions as well as some international tournaments, while supplying players to the U17 and U20 national teams on a regular basis.
