= Manuel Gasparini =

Italian footballer

Personal information
- Date of birth: 19 May 2002 (age 24)
- Place of birth: San Daniele del Friuli, Italy
- Height: 1.86 m (6 ft 1 in)
- Position: Goalkeeper

Team information
- Current team: Mantova
- Number: 12

Youth career
- –2021: Udinese

Senior career*
Years	Team	Apps	(Gls)
2021–2022	Udinese	1	(0)
2021	→ Pro Vercelli (loan)	0	(0)
2021–2022	→ Legnago Salus (loan)	5	(0)
2022–2024	Potenza	52	(0)
2024	→ Pescara (loan)	0	(0)
2024–2025	Clodiense	30	(0)
2025–2026	Empoli	0	(0)
2026–	Mantova	0	(0)

International career^{‡}
2017	Italy U15	5	(0)
2017–2018	Italy U16	7	(0)
2018–2019	Italy U17	8	(0)
2019	Italy U18	2	(0)
- * Club domestic league appearances and goals as of 22 August 2026 ‡ National team caps and goals as of 18:04, 23 May 2021 (UTC)

Manuel Gasparini (born 19 May 2002) is an Italian footballer who plays as a goalkeeper for Serie B club Mantova.

== Club career ==
Gasparini was included in The Guardian's "Next Generation 2019".

On 9 July 2021, he joined Pro Vercelli on loan from Udinese.

On 26 August 2021, he was loaned to Legnago Salus. On 31 January 2022, the loan was terminated early.

On 26 July 2022, Gasparini moved to Potenza.

On 4 January 2024, he joined Pescara on loan.

On 25 August 2025, Gasparini signed with Empoli in Serie B.

== Club statistics ==
=== Club ===
As of match played 23 May 2021

Club	Season	League			Cup		Other		Total	
Club	Season	Division	Apps	Goals	Apps	Goals	Apps	Goals	Apps	Goals
Udinese	2020–21	Serie A	1	0	0	0	0	0	1	0
Career total			1	0	0	0	0	0	1	0
