= 2019 FIFA U-17 World Cup =

International football competition

Copa do Mundo Sub-17 da FIFA Brasil 2019

Tournament details
- Host country: Brazil
- Dates: 26 October – 17 November
- Teams: 24 (from 6 confederations)
- Venues: 4 (in 3 host cities)

Final positions
- Champions: Brazil (4th title)
- Runners-up: Mexico
- Third place: France
- Fourth place: Netherlands

Tournament statistics
- Matches played: 52
- Goals scored: 177 (3.4 per match)
- Attendance: 174,603 (3,358 per match)
- Top scorer: (Netherlands) Sontje Hansen (6 goals)
- Best player: (Brazil) Gabriel Veron
- Best goalkeeper: (Brazil) Matheus Donelli
- Fair play award: Ecuador

The 2019 FIFA U-17 World Cup was the 18th edition of the FIFA U-17 World Cup, the biennial international men's youth football championship contested by the under-17 national teams of the member associations of FIFA. It was hosted by Brazil between 26 October and 17 November 2019.

Originally, Peru was scheduled to host the tournament between 5 and 27 October 2019, however, it was announced in February 2019 that they would no longer host the tournament, following inspection of the facilities and concern over organizational challenges. A formal announcement on 15 March 2019 ratified the recommendation to move the tournament to Brazil. With the ratification to name Brazil as host, this marked the country's first time to host a FIFA youth competition, having previously hosted the senior World Cup twice as well as the 2000 FIFA Club World Championship, the 2008 FIFA Futsal World Cup, the 2013 FIFA Confederations Cup, and numerous editions of the FIFA Beach Soccer World Cup.

England were the defending champions, but unable to defend their title after being eliminated in the group stages at the 2019 UEFA European Under-17 Championship in the Republic of Ireland. England became the second consecutive title holders that failed to qualify. Brazil won their fourth U-17 World Cup title, winning 2–1 against Mexico in the final, which was also the first time in the history that Brazil won a FIFA World Cup tournament at home soil.

== Host selection ==
The bidding process to host the 2019 FIFA U-20 World Cup and the 2019 FIFA U-17 World Cup was launched by FIFA in June 2017. A member association may bid for both tournaments, but they would be awarded to different hosts.

=== Original round of bidding ===
Two countries publicly declared their formal bids to host the tournament.

- Peru
- Rwanda (withdrawn)

On 8 March 2018, Rwanda withdrew its bid to host the tournament due to time and logistic aspects. FIFA then unanimously announced Peru as the host country after the FIFA Council meeting on 16 March 2018 in Bogotá, Colombia.

=== Second round of bidding ===
On 22 February 2019, FIFA announced that the tournament would be moved to a yet-to-be-determined host after inspection visits found issues with the prepared infrastructure and organization in Peru. On the same day, FIFA Secretary-General Fatma Samoura sent a letter to the Brazilian Football Confederation to determine if the tournament could be held in that country, and the answer was positive. CONMEBOL reinforced the idea by claiming that, because of the preparation for the 2019 Copa América, which was scheduled to start in less than four months, Brazil would be the only one able to make the commitment in such a short time. With the change of venue, the tournament was delayed by three weeks. Brazil was confirmed as the new host by the FIFA Council on 15 March 2019. However, of all the stadiums that were chosen to host the Copa América 2019 games were not used as all the venues were used as training venues by the participant's national squads.

== Qualified teams ==
A total of 24 teams qualified for the final tournament. Brazil as host team along with 23 other teams qualified from six separate continental competitions. The slot allocation was approved by the FIFA Council on 10 June 2018.

Confederation	Qualifying tournament	Team	Appearance	Last appearance	Previous best performance
AFC (Asia)	2018 AFC U-16 Championship	Australia	13th	2015	Runners-up (1999)
AFC (Asia)	2018 AFC U-16 Championship	Japan	9th	2017	Quarter-finals (1993, 2011)
AFC (Asia)	2018 AFC U-16 Championship	South Korea	6th	2015	Quarter-finals (1987, 2009)
AFC (Asia)	2018 AFC U-16 Championship	Tajikistan	2nd	2007	Round of 16 (2007)
CAF (Africa)	2019 Africa U-17 Cup of Nations	Cameroon	2nd	2003	Group stage (2003)
CAF (Africa)	2019 Africa U-17 Cup of Nations	Nigeria	12th	2015	Champions (1985, 1993, 2007, 2013, 2015)
CAF (Africa)	2019 Africa U-17 Cup of Nations	Angola	1st	N/A	Debut
CAF (Africa)	2019 Africa U-17 Cup of Nations	Senegal (Note: Guinea originally qualified, but was ejected from the competition, with CAF ordering its results be deleted from the records, for age fabrication relating to two players. The CAF Executive Committee approved Senegal as their replacement.)	1st	N/A	Debut
CONCACAF (Central, North America and Caribbean)	2019 CONCACAF U-17 Championship	Canada	7th	2013	Group stage (1987, 1989, 1993, 1995, 2011, 2013)
CONCACAF (Central, North America and Caribbean)	2019 CONCACAF U-17 Championship	United States	17th	2017	Fourth place (1999)
CONCACAF (Central, North America and Caribbean)	2019 CONCACAF U-17 Championship	Mexico	14th	2017	Champions (2005, 2011)
CONCACAF (Central, North America and Caribbean)	2019 CONCACAF U-17 Championship	Haiti	2nd	2007	Group stage (2007)
CONMEBOL (South America)	Host nation	Brazil	17th	2017	Champions (1997, 1999, 2003)
CONMEBOL (South America)	2019 South American U-17 Championship	Argentina	14th	2015	Third place (1991, 1995, 2003)
CONMEBOL (South America)	2019 South American U-17 Championship	Chile	5th	2017	Third place (1993)
CONMEBOL (South America)	2019 South American U-17 Championship	Ecuador	5th	2015	Quarter-finals (1995, 2015)
CONMEBOL (South America)	2019 South American U-17 Championship	Paraguay	5th	2017	Quarter-finals (1999)
OFC (Oceania)	2018 OFC U-16 Championship	New Zealand	9th	2017	Round of 16 (2009, 2011, 2015)
OFC (Oceania)	2018 OFC U-16 Championship	Solomon Islands (Note: The Solomon Islands, which originally finished second in the 2018 OFC U-16 Championship, were found by the OFC to have deliberately fielded overage player Chris Satu during the tournament. As a result, they had forfeited all results and their place in the 2019 FIFA U-17 World Cup. The decision was appealed by the Solomon Islands Football Federation, and the OFC Executive Committee met to decide on their replacement after the appeal process has been concluded and decided to uphold the appeal, thus allowing Solomon Islands to take part in the tournament.)	1st	N/A	Debut
UEFA (Europe)	2019 UEFA European Under-17 Championship	France	7th	2017	Champions (2001)
UEFA (Europe)	2019 UEFA European Under-17 Championship	Netherlands	4th	2011	Third place (2005)
UEFA (Europe)	2019 UEFA European Under-17 Championship	Italy	8th	2013	Fourth place (1987)
UEFA (Europe)	2019 UEFA European Under-17 Championship	Spain	10th	2017	Runners-up (1991, 2003, 2007, 2017)
UEFA (Europe)	2019 UEFA European Under-17 Championship	Hungary	2nd	1985	Quarter-finals (1985)

== Venues ==
The tournament used four venues in three cities.

Goiânia		2019 FIFA U-17 World Cup is located in Brazil
Estádio da Serrinha	Estádio Olímpico	2019 FIFA U-17 World Cup is located in Brazil
Capacity: 9,900	Capacity: 13,500	2019 FIFA U-17 World Cup is located in Brazil
Gama (Brasília area)	Cariacica (Vitória area)	2019 FIFA U-17 World Cup is located in Brazil
Estádio Bezerrão	Estádio Kléber Andrade	2019 FIFA U-17 World Cup is located in Brazil
Capacity: 20,310	Capacity: 21,000	2019 FIFA U-17 World Cup is located in Brazil

== Organization ==
=== Emblem ===
The official emblem was unveiled on 10 July 2019 ahead of the draw. The emblem takes its inspiration from the country's rich history and diverse landscapes, with a variety of distinctive elements coming together to form the shape of the tournament trophy. The base evokes the lush green of Brazil's natural scenery. Sweeping vegetation leads the viewer's eye past the intense reds of the Brazilian soil and yellowy orange of the country's world-famous gemstones towards a celebratory figure. That figure, in turn, reaches towards a ball, the design of which is inspired by the iconic curved columns of Cathedral of Brasília, a masterpiece by renowned Brazilian architect Oscar Niemeyer.

== Draw and schedule ==
The match schedule was unveiled on 10 July 2019, the day before the final draw. The kick-off times were confirmed on 25 July 2019.

The final draw was held on 11 July 2019, 15:00 CEST (UTC+2), at the FIFA headquarters in Zürich, Switzerland. The draw ceremony was presented by Bruno Sassi and conducted by FIFA Director of Competitions Christian Unger, with the former U-17 World Cup champions Nigerian Celestine Babayaro and the former Brazilian footballer Sonny Anderson, acting as draw assistants. The ceremony was also attended by FIFA President Gianni Infantino and Brazilian Football Confederation President Rogério Caboclo.

The 24 teams were drawn into six groups of four teams with hosts Brazil being automatically seeded into Pot 1 and assigned to the first position of group A. The remaining teams were seeded into their respective pots based on their results in the last five FIFA U-17 World Cups (more recent tournaments weighted more heavily), and with five bonus points added to each of the 6 continental champions from the qualifying tournaments, as follows:

Pot	Team	Confederation	2009	2011	2013	2015	2017		
Pot	Team	Confederation	Points (20%)	Points (40%)	Points (60%)	Points (80%)	Points (100%)	Bonus (Note: Continental champions bonus points)	Total points
1	Brazil (H)	CONMEBOL	Host nation, automatically assigned to Pot 1						
1	Nigeria	CAF	3.2	DNQ	11.4	14.4	DNQ		29
1	France	UEFA	DNQ	3.2	DNQ	8	9		20.2
1	Japan	AFC	0	4	5.4	DNQ	5	+5	19.4
1	Spain	UEFA	3.2	DNQ	DNQ	DNQ	15		18.2
2	Argentina	CONMEBOL	1.2	1.6	7.8	0	DNQ	+5	15.6
2	United States	CONCACAF	1.2	1.6	DNQ	0.8	9		12.6
2	New Zealand	OFC	0.6	1.6	0	3.2	1	+5	11.4
2	Paraguay	CONMEBOL	DNQ	DNQ	DNQ	2.4	9		11.4
2	Ecuador	CONMEBOL	DNQ	2.4	DNQ	7.2	DNQ		9.6
2	South Korea	AFC	1.4	DNQ	DNQ	5.6	DNQ		7
3	Netherlands	UEFA	0.6	0.4	DNQ	DNQ	DNQ	+5	6
3	Italy	UEFA	2	DNQ	3.6	DNQ	DNQ		5.6
3	Cameroon	CAF	DNQ	DNQ	DNQ	DNQ	DNQ	+5	5
3	Australia	AFC	DNQ	1.6	DNQ	3.2	DNQ		4.8
3	Chile	CONMEBOL	DNQ	DNQ	DNQ	3.2	1		4.2
3	Canada	CONCACAF	DNQ	0.8	1.2	DNQ	DNQ		2
4	Angola	CAF	DNQ	DNQ	DNQ	DNQ	DNQ		0
4	Haiti	CONCACAF	DNQ	DNQ	DNQ	DNQ	DNQ		0
4	Hungary	UEFA	DNQ	DNQ	DNQ	DNQ	DNQ		0
4	Senegal	CAF	DNQ	DNQ	DNQ	DNQ	DNQ		0
4	Solomon Islands	OFC	DNQ	DNQ	DNQ	DNQ	DNQ		0
4	Tajikistan	AFC	DNQ	DNQ	DNQ	DNQ	DNQ		0

The draw started with the hosts Brazil being "drawn" to A1. Teams from Pot 1 were drawn first, followed by Pot 2, Pot 3, and finally Pot 4, with each team also drawn to one of the positions within their group. Teams from the same confederation could not be drawn within the same group.

The draw resulted in the following groups:

Group A
Pos	Team
A1	Brazil
A2	Canada
A3	New Zealand
A4	Angola

Group B
Pos	Team
B1	Nigeria
B2	Hungary
B3	Ecuador
B4	Australia

Group C
Pos	Team
C1	South Korea
C2	Haiti
C3	France
C4	Chile

Group D
Pos	Team
D1	United States
D2	Senegal
D3	Japan
D4	Netherlands

Group E
Pos	Team
E1	Spain
E2	Argentina
E3	Tajikistan
E4	Cameroon

Group F
Pos	Team
F1	Solomon Islands
F2	Italy
F3	Paraguay
F4	Mexico

== Match officials ==
A total of 20 refereeing trios (a referee and two assistant referees), 5 support referees, and 17 video assistant referees were appointed for the tournament.

Confederation	Referee	Assistant referees	Support referees	Video assistant referees
AFC	(Qatar) Khamis Al-Marri	(Qatar) Mohammad Dharman (Qatar) Ramzan Al-Naemi	(South Korea) Ko Hyung-jin	(United Arab Emirates) Yaqoub Al Hammadi (Qatar) Abdullah Ali Al Marri (Japan) Hiroyuki Kimura
AFC	(Australia) Chris Beath	(Australia) Anton Shchetinin (Australia) Ashley Beecham	(South Korea) Ko Hyung-jin	(United Arab Emirates) Yaqoub Al Hammadi (Qatar) Abdullah Ali Al Marri (Japan) Hiroyuki Kimura
AFC	(China) Ma Ning	(China) Shi Xiang (China) Cao Yi	(South Korea) Ko Hyung-jin	(United Arab Emirates) Yaqoub Al Hammadi (Qatar) Abdullah Ali Al Marri (Japan) Hiroyuki Kimura
CAF	(South Africa) Victor Gomes	(Lesotho) Souru Phatsoane (Madagascar) Lionel Hasinjarasoa Andrianantenaina	(Kenya) Peter Waweru	—
CAF	(Morocco) Redouane Jiyed	(Morocco) Lahcen Azgaou (Morocco) Mustaph Akerkad	(Kenya) Peter Waweru	—
CAF	(Egypt) Amin Mohamed Omar	(Libya) Attia Amsaeed (Sudan) Abdallah Ibrahim Mohammed	(Kenya) Peter Waweru	—
CONCACAF	(El Salvador) Iván Barton	(El Salvador) David Morán (Suriname) Zachari Zeegelaar	(Costa Rica) Juan Gabriel Calderón	(Mexico) Quetzalli Alvarado (Canada) Drew Fischer (United States) Armando Villarreal
CONCACAF	(Guatemala) Mario Escobar	(Guatemala) Humberto Noel Panjoj (Jamaica) Nicholas Andersson	(Costa Rica) Juan Gabriel Calderón	(Mexico) Quetzalli Alvarado (Canada) Drew Fischer (United States) Armando Villarreal
CONCACAF	(Mexico) Adonai Escobedo	(Costa Rica) William Andrés Arrieta (Canada) Micheal Barwegen	(Costa Rica) Juan Gabriel Calderón	(Mexico) Quetzalli Alvarado (Canada) Drew Fischer (United States) Armando Villarreal
CONMEBOL	(Paraguay) Mario Díaz De Vivar	(Paraguay) Milcíades Saldívar (Paraguay) Roberto Casiano Cañete	(Brazil) Edina Alves Batista (Bolivia) Ivo Méndez	(Argentina) Germán Delfino (Colombia) Nicolás Gallo (Chile) Piero Maza (Brazil) Bráulio da Silva Machado
CONMEBOL	(Ecuador) Guillermo Guerrero	(Ecuador) Juan Carlos Macías (Ecuador) Ricardo Baren	(Brazil) Edina Alves Batista (Bolivia) Ivo Méndez	(Argentina) Germán Delfino (Colombia) Nicolás Gallo (Chile) Piero Maza (Brazil) Bráulio da Silva Machado
CONMEBOL	(Peru) Diego Haro	(Peru) Víctor Ráez (Peru) Michael Orué	(Brazil) Edina Alves Batista (Bolivia) Ivo Méndez	(Argentina) Germán Delfino (Colombia) Nicolás Gallo (Chile) Piero Maza (Brazil) Bráulio da Silva Machado
CONMEBOL	(Colombia) Andrés Rojas	(Colombia) Dionisio Ruiz (Colombia) John Alexander León	(Brazil) Edina Alves Batista (Bolivia) Ivo Méndez	(Argentina) Germán Delfino (Colombia) Nicolás Gallo (Chile) Piero Maza (Brazil) Bráulio da Silva Machado
CONMEBOL	(Uruguay) Claudia Umpiérrez	(Uruguay) Luciana Mascaraña (Ecuador) Mónica Amboya	(Brazil) Edina Alves Batista (Bolivia) Ivo Méndez	(Argentina) Germán Delfino (Colombia) Nicolás Gallo (Chile) Piero Maza (Brazil) Bráulio da Silva Machado
OFC	(New Zealand) Nick Waldron	(New Zealand) Isaac Trevis (Vanuatu) Jeremy Garae	—	—
UEFA	(Sweden) Andreas Ekberg	(Sweden) Mehmet Culum (Sweden) Stefan Hallberg	—	(Portugal) Luís Godinho (Spain) Ricardo de Burgos Bengoetxea (Italy) Marco Di Bello (Poland) Bartosz Frankowski (Netherlands) Dennis Higler (England) Craig Pawson (Germany) Bibiana Steinhaus
UEFA	(Serbia) Srđan Jovanović	(Serbia) Uroš Stojković (Serbia) Milan Mihajlović	—	(Portugal) Luís Godinho (Spain) Ricardo de Burgos Bengoetxea (Italy) Marco Di Bello (Poland) Bartosz Frankowski (Netherlands) Dennis Higler (England) Craig Pawson (Germany) Bibiana Steinhaus
UEFA	(Bulgaria) Georgi Kabakov	(Bulgaria) Martin Margaritov (Bulgaria) Diyan Valkov	—	(Portugal) Luís Godinho (Spain) Ricardo de Burgos Bengoetxea (Italy) Marco Di Bello (Poland) Bartosz Frankowski (Netherlands) Dennis Higler (England) Craig Pawson (Germany) Bibiana Steinhaus
UEFA	(Romania) István Kovács	(Romania) Vasile Marinescu (Romania) Ovidiu Artene	—	(Portugal) Luís Godinho (Spain) Ricardo de Burgos Bengoetxea (Italy) Marco Di Bello (Poland) Bartosz Frankowski (Netherlands) Dennis Higler (England) Craig Pawson (Germany) Bibiana Steinhaus
UEFA	(Latvia) Andris Treimanis	(Latvia) Haralds Gudermanis (Latvia) Aleksejs Spasjonnikovs	—	(Portugal) Luís Godinho (Spain) Ricardo de Burgos Bengoetxea (Italy) Marco Di Bello (Poland) Bartosz Frankowski (Netherlands) Dennis Higler (England) Craig Pawson (Germany) Bibiana Steinhaus

== Squads ==
Players born on or after 1 January 2002 and on or before 31 December 2004 were eligible to compete in the tournament.

Each team had to name a preliminary squad of between 22 and 50 players. From the preliminary squad, the team had to name a final squad of 21 players (three of whom must be goalkeepers) by the FIFA deadline. Players in the final squad could be replaced by a player from the preliminary squad due to serious injury or illness up to 24 hours prior to kickoff of the team's first match.

== Group stage ==
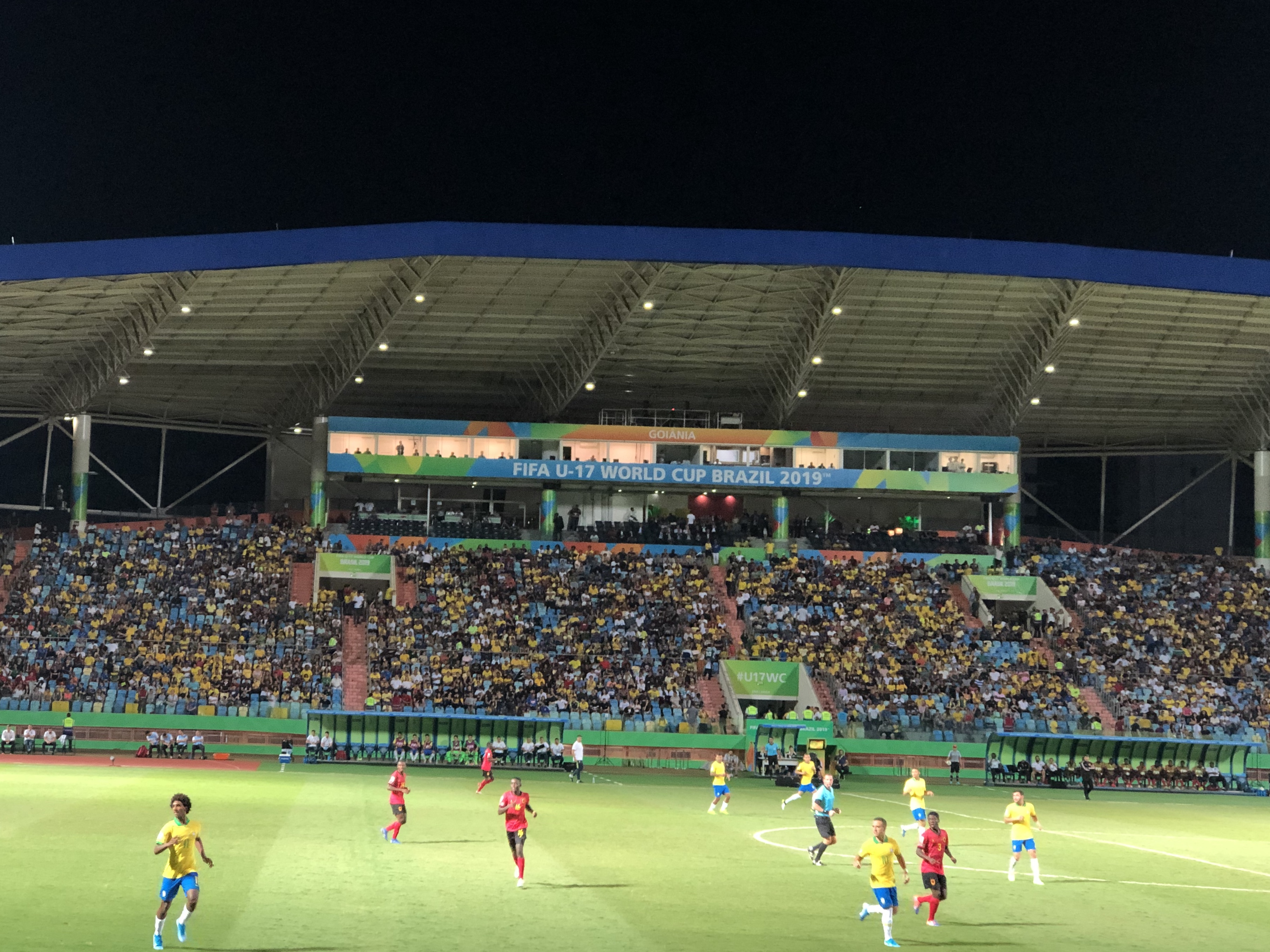
Brazil v Angola.

The top two teams of each group and the four best third-placed teams advanced to the round of 16.

All times are local, BRT (UTC−3).

=== Tiebreakers ===
The ranking of teams in the group stage was determined as follows:

1. Points obtained in all group matches (three points for a win, one for a draw, none for a defeat);
2. Goal difference in all group matches;
3. Number of goals scored in all group matches;
4. Points obtained in the matches played between the teams in question;
5. Goal difference in the matches played between the teams in question;
6. Number of goals scored in the matches played between the teams in question;
7. Fair play points in all group matches (only one deduction could be applied to a player in a single match):
  - Yellow card: −1 points;
  - Indirect red card (second yellow card): −3 points;
  - Direct red card: −4 points;
  - Yellow card and direct red card: −5 points;
8. Drawing of lots.

=== Group A ===
Pos	Team	Pld	W	D	L	GF	GA	GD	Pts	Qualification
1	Brazil (H)	3	3	0	0	9	1	+8	9	Advance to knockout stage
2	Angola	3	2	0	1	4	4	0	6	Advance to knockout stage
3	New Zealand	3	1	0	2	2	5	−3	3	
4	Canada	3	0	0	3	2	7	−5	0	

Source: FIFA
Rules for classification: Group stage tiebreakers
(H) Hosts
26 October 2019
17:00

Brazil	4–1	Canada
Peglow 17', 46'; Franklin 45+1' (o.g.); Veron 56'	Report	Russell-Rowe 86'

Estádio Bezerrão, Gama
Attendance: 11,468
Referee: Srđan Jovanović (Serbia)
26 October 2019
20:00

New Zealand	1–2	Angola
Garbett 54'	Report	Zini 6'; Bark 60' (o.g.)

Estádio Bezerrão, Gama
Attendance: 553
Referee: Ma Ning (China)

29 October 2019
17:00

Angola	2–1	Canada
Zini 31'; David 90+4'	Report	Russell-Rowe 49'

Estádio Bezerrão, Gama
Attendance: 1,232
Referee: Claudia Umpiérrez (Uruguay)
29 October 2019
20:00

Brazil	3–0	New Zealand
Kaio 20'; Talles 81'; Diego 90+1'	Report

Estádio Bezerrão, Gama
Attendance: 14,158
Referee: Mario Escobar (Guatemala)

1 November 2019
20:00

Angola	0–2	Brazil
	Report	Talles 68'; Veron 77'

Estádio Olímpico, Goiânia
Attendance: 8,203
Referee: Andreas Ekberg (Sweden)
1 November 2019
20:00

Canada	0–1	New Zealand
	Report	Garbett 27'

Estádio Bezerrão, Gama
Attendance: 1,154
Referee: Mario Díaz de Vivar (Paraguay)

=== Group B ===
Pos	Team	Pld	W	D	L	GF	GA	GD	Pts	Qualification
1	Nigeria	3	2	0	1	8	6	+2	6	Advance to knockout stage
2	Ecuador	3	2	0	1	7	6	+1	6	Advance to knockout stage
3	Australia	3	1	1	1	5	5	0	4	Advance to knockout stage
4	Hungary	3	0	1	2	6	9	−3	1	

Source: FIFA
Rules for classification: Group stage tiebreakers
26 October 2019
17:00

Nigeria	4–2	Hungary
Tijani 20' (pen.), 85'; Ibrahim 79'; Adeniyi 81'	Report	Komáromi 3'; Major 28'

Estádio Olímpico, Goiânia
Attendance: 944
Referee: Diego Haro (Peru)
26 October 2019
20:00

Ecuador	2–1	Australia
Plúas 4'; Mlinaric 9' (o.g.)	Report	Botic 90'

Estádio Olímpico, Goiânia
Attendance: 337
Referee: Andreas Ekberg (Sweden)

29 October 2019
17:00

Nigeria	3–2	Ecuador
Said 5', 85', 89'	Report	Jinadu 10' (o.g.); Mina 56' (pen.)

Estádio Olímpico, Goiânia
Attendance: 311
Referee: Khamis Al-Marri (Qatar)
29 October 2019
20:00

Australia	2–2	Hungary
Botic 69' (pen.); Watts 74'	Report	Baráth 14'; Zuigeber 20' (pen.)

Estádio Olímpico, Goiânia
Attendance: 233
Referee: Amin Mohamed Omar (Egypt)

1 November 2019
17:00

Australia	2–1	Nigeria
Botic 13', 54' (pen.)	Report	Olawale 21'

Estádio Bezerrão, Gama
Attendance: 851
Referee: István Kovács (Romania)
1 November 2019
17:00

Hungary	2–3	Ecuador
Németh 50', 73'	Report	Vite 66'; Mercado 68'; Mina 86'

Estádio Olímpico, Goiânia
Attendance: 890
Referee: Ma Ning (China)

=== Group C ===
Pos	Team	Pld	W	D	L	GF	GA	GD	Pts	Qualification
1	France	3	3	0	0	7	1	+6	9	Advance to knockout stage
2	South Korea	3	2	0	1	5	5	0	6	Advance to knockout stage
3	Chile	3	1	0	2	5	6	−1	3	Advance to knockout stage
4	Haiti	3	0	0	3	3	8	−5	0	

Source: FIFA
Rules for classification: Group stage tiebreakers
27 October 2019
17:00

France	2–0	Chile
Agoumé 63' (pen.); Lihadji 64'	Report

Estádio da Serrinha, Goiânia
Attendance: 1,469
Referee: Iván Barton (El Salvador)
27 October 2019
20:00

South Korea	2–1	Haiti
Eom Ji-sung 26'; Choi Min-seo 41'	Report	Sainte 88'

Estádio da Serrinha, Goiânia
Attendance: 1,433
Referee: Victor Gomes (South Africa)

30 October 2019
17:00

South Korea	1–3	France
Jeong Sang-bin 89'	Report	Kalimuendo 17'; Pembélé 42'; Lihadji 78'

Estádio da Serrinha, Goiânia
Attendance: 696
Referee: Adonai Escobedo (Mexico)
30 October 2019
20:00

Chile	4–2	Haiti
Rojas 11'; Ceneus 45' (o.g.); Tapia 52'; Tati 89'	Report	Jeanty 37' (pen.); Jolicoeur 55'

Estádio da Serrinha, Goiânia
Attendance: 759
Referee: Andris Treimanis (Latvia)

2 November 2019
17:00

Chile	1–2	South Korea
Oroz 41'	Report	Paik Sang-hoon 1'; Hong Sung-wook 30'

Estádio Kléber Andrade, Cariacica
Attendance: 4,686
Referee: Georgi Kabakov (Bulgaria)
2 November 2019
17:00

Haiti	0–2	France
	Report	Rutter 78' (pen.), 79'

Estádio da Serrinha, Goiânia
Attendance: 1,016
Referee: Nick Waldron (New Zealand)

=== Group D ===
Pos	Team	Pld	W	D	L	GF	GA	GD	Pts	Qualification
1	Japan	3	2	1	0	4	0	+4	7	Advance to knockout stage
2	Senegal	3	2	0	1	7	3	+4	6	Advance to knockout stage
3	Netherlands	3	1	0	2	5	6	−1	3	Advance to knockout stage
4	United States	3	0	1	2	1	8	−7	1	

Source: FIFA
Rules for classification: Group stage tiebreakers
27 October 2019
17:00

United States	1–4	Senegal
Busio 3'	Report	S. Faye 45+3'; Balde 72'; A. Faye 76'; Sarr 88'

Estádio Kléber Andrade, Cariacica
Attendance: 4,266
Referee: István Kovács (Romania)
27 October 2019
20:00

Japan	3–0	Netherlands
Wakatsuki 36', 69'; Nishikawa 77' (pen.)	Report

Estádio Kléber Andrade, Cariacica
Attendance: 5,125
Referee: Mario Díaz de Vivar (Paraguay)

30 October 2019
17:00

Netherlands	1–3	Senegal
Bannis 10'	Report	Sarr 46', 87' (pen.); Balde 90+5'

Estádio Kléber Andrade, Cariacica
Attendance: 2,492
Referee: Andrés Rojas (Colombia)
30 October 2019
20:00

United States	0–0	Japan
	Report

Estádio Kléber Andrade, Cariacica
Attendance: 3,878
Referee: Guillermo Guerrero (Ecuador)

2 November 2019
20:00

Netherlands	4–0	United States
Hansen 42', 51'; Taabouni 70'; Braaf 86'	Report

Estádio da Serrinha, Goiânia
Attendance: 1,305
Referee: Amin Mohamed Omar (Egypt)
2 November 2019
20:00

Senegal	0–1	Japan
	Report	Nishikawa 83'

Estádio Kléber Andrade, Cariacica
Attendance: 5,984
Referee: Claudia Umpiérrez (Uruguay)

=== Group E ===
Pos	Team	Pld	W	D	L	GF	GA	GD	Pts	Qualification
1	Spain	3	2	1	0	7	1	+6	7	Advance to knockout stage
2	Argentina	3	2	1	0	6	2	+4	7	Advance to knockout stage
3	Tajikistan	3	1	0	2	3	8	−5	3	
4	Cameroon	3	0	0	3	1	6	−5	0	

Source: FIFA
Rules for classification: Group stage tiebreakers
28 October 2019
17:00

Spain	0–0	Argentina
	Report

Estádio Kléber Andrade, Cariacica
Attendance: 6,845
Referee: Chris Beath (Australia)
28 October 2019
20:00

Tajikistan	1–0	Cameroon
Rahmatov 51' (pen.)	Report

Estádio Kléber Andrade, Cariacica
Attendance: 5,934
Referee: Nick Waldron (New Zealand)

31 October 2019
17:00

Spain	5–1	Tajikistan
Valera 4'; Navarro 20', 64'; Moreno 35'; Larrubia 45+1'	Report	Carrillo 37' (o.g.)

Estádio Kléber Andrade, Cariacica
Attendance: 1,589
Referee: Iván Barton (El Salvador)
31 October 2019
20:00

Cameroon	1–3	Argentina
Bere 10'	Report	Flores 58'; Krilanovich 63'; Godoy 88'

Estádio Kléber Andrade, Cariacica
Attendance: 3,521
Referee: Srđan Jovanović (Serbia)

3 November 2019
17:00

Cameroon	0–2	Spain
	Report	Escobar 21'; Moriba 42'

Estádio Bezerrão, Gama
Attendance: 1,415
Referee: Adonai Escobedo (Mexico)
3 November 2019
17:00

Argentina	3–1	Tajikistan
Orozco 38', 78'; Godoy 89'	Report	Soirov 81' (pen.)

Estádio Kléber Andrade, Cariacica
Attendance: 3,419
Referee: Redouane Jiyed (Morocco)

=== Group F ===
Pos	Team	Pld	W	D	L	GF	GA	GD	Pts	Qualification
1	Paraguay	3	2	1	0	9	1	+8	7	Advance to knockout stage
2	Italy	3	2	0	1	8	3	+5	6	Advance to knockout stage
3	Mexico	3	1	1	1	9	2	+7	4	Advance to knockout stage
4	Solomon Islands	3	0	0	3	0	20	−20	0	

Source: FIFA
Rules for classification: Group stage tiebreakers
28 October 2019
17:00

Solomon Islands	0–5	Italy
	Report	Gnonto 24', 34'; Cudrig 29'; Tongya 75'; Capone 81'

Estádio Bezerrão, Gama
Attendance: 859
Referee: Redouane Jiyed (Morocco)
28 October 2019
20:00

Paraguay	0–0	Mexico
	Report

Estádio Bezerrão, Gama
Attendance: 710
Referee: Georgi Kabakov (Bulgaria)

31 October 2019
17:00

Solomon Islands	0–7	Paraguay
	Report	Noguera 3'; Segovia 43'; Torres 65', 89'; Presentado 68'; Barrios 78'; D. Duarte 88'

Estádio Bezerrão, Gama
Attendance: 571
Referee: Victor Gomes (South Africa)
31 October 2019
20:00

Mexico	1–2	Italy
Álvarez 90+2'	Report	Gnonto 74'; Udogie 90+4'

Estádio Bezerrão, Gama
Attendance: 1,611
Referee: Diego Haro (Peru)

3 November 2019
20:00

Mexico	8–0	Solomon Islands
Álvarez 2', 63'; A. Gómez 33', 80'; Puente 44'; Luna 58', 90'; Ávila 72'	Report

Estádio Kléber Andrade, Cariacica
Attendance: 1,916
Referee: Andrés Rojas (Colombia)
3 November 2019
20:00

Italy	1–2	Paraguay
Pirola 3'	Report	D. Duarte 37'; Quiñónez 52'

Estádio Bezerrão, Gama
Attendance: 824
Referee: Khamis Al-Marri (Qatar)

=== Ranking of third-placed teams ===
The four best third-placed teams from the six groups advance to the knockout stage along with the six group winners and six runners-up.

Pos	Grp	Team	Pld	W	D	L	GF	GA	GD	Pts	Qualification
1	F	Mexico	3	1	1	1	9	2	+7	4	Advance to knockout stage
2	B	Australia	3	1	1	1	5	5	0	4	Advance to knockout stage
3	C	Chile	3	1	0	2	5	6	−1	3 (Note: Fair play points: Chile −4, Netherlands −9.)	Advance to knockout stage
4	D	Netherlands	3	1	0	2	5	6	−1	3	Advance to knockout stage
5	A	New Zealand	3	1	0	2	2	5	−3	3	
6	E	Tajikistan	3	1	0	2	3	8	−5	3	

Source: FIFA
Rules for classification: 1) Points; 2) Goal difference; 3) Goals scored; 4) Fair play points; 5) Drawing of lots.
Notes:

In the next stage the four third-placed teams will be matched with the winners of groups A, B, C, and D according to the tournament regulations.

== Knockout stage ==
In the knockout stage, if a match is level at the end of 90 minutes of normal playing time, the match would be directly decided by a penalty shoot-out to determine the winner; no extra time would be played.

In the round of 16, the four third-placed teams would be matched with the winners of groups A, B, C, and D. The specific match-ups involving the third-placed teams depend on which four third-placed teams qualified for the round of 16:

Combination according to the four qualified teams

Third-placed teams qualify from groups						1A vs	1B vs	1C vs	1D vs
A	B	C	D			3C	3D	3A	3B
A	B	C		E		3C	3A	3B	3E
A	B	C			F	3C	3A	3B	3F
A	B		D	E		3D	3A	3B	3E
A	B		D		F	3D	3A	3B	3F
A	B			E	F	3E	3A	3B	3F
A		C	D	E		3C	3D	3A	3E
A		C	D		F	3C	3D	3A	3F
A		C		E	F	3C	3A	3F	3E
A			D	E	F	3D	3A	3F	3E
	B	C	D	E		3C	3D	3B	3E
	B	C	D		F	3C	3D	3B	3F
	B	C		E	F	3E	3C	3B	3F
	B		D	E	F	3E	3D	3B	3F
		C	D	E	F	3C	3D	3F	3E

=== Bracket ===
Round of 16
5 November – Goiânia (Olímpico)
Angola	0
South Korea	1
6 November – Gama
Japan	0
Mexico	2
5 November – Goiânia (Olímpico)
Nigeria	1
Netherlands	3
7 November – Cariacica
Paraguay	3
Argentina	2
6 November – Goiânia (Serrinha)
Spain	2
Senegal	1
6 November – Goiânia (Serrinha)
France	4
Australia	0
7 November – Cariacica
Ecuador	0
Italy	1
6 November – Gama
Brazil	3
Chile	2

Quarter-finals
10 November – Cariacica
South Korea	0
Mexico	1
10 November – Cariacica
Netherlands	4
Paraguay	1
11 November – Goiânia (Olímpico)
Spain	1
France	6
11 November – Goiânia (Olímpico)
Italy	0
Brazil	2

Semi-finals
14 November – Gama
Mexico (p)	1 (4)
Netherlands	1 (3)
14 November – Gama
France	2
Brazil	3

Final
17 November – Gama
Mexico	1
Brazil	2
Third place match
17 November – Gama
Netherlands	1
France	3

=== Round of 16 ===
5 November 2019
16:30

Angola	0–1	South Korea
	Report	Choi Min-seo 33'

Estádio Olímpico, Goiânia
Attendance: 390
Referee: Srđan Jovanović (Serbia)

5 November 2019
20:00

Nigeria	1–3	Netherlands
Olusegun 12'	Report	Hansen 4', 15', 80' (pen.)

Estádio Olímpico, Goiânia
Attendance: 664
Referee: Mario Escobar (Guatemala)

6 November 2019
16:30

Spain	2–1	Senegal
Navarro 27'; Valera 59'	Report	S. Faye 85'

Estádio da Serrinha, Goiânia
Attendance: 483
Referee: Guillermo Guerrero (Ecuador)

6 November 2019
16:30

Japan	0–2	Mexico
	Report	Pizzuto 57'; Muñoz 74'

Estádio Bezerrão, Gama
Attendance: 545
Referee: Amin Mohamed Omar (Egypt)

6 November 2019
20:00

Brazil	3–2	Chile
Kaio 8', 45+2' (pen.); Diego 65'	Report	Cruz 25', 41'

Estádio Bezerrão, Gama
Attendance: 12,534
Referee: Andris Treimanis (Latvia)

6 November 2019
20:00

France	4–0	Australia
Mbuku 6', 74', 82'; Millot 87'	Report

Estádio da Serrinha, Goiânia
Attendance: 814
Referee: Claudia Umpiérrez (Uruguay)

7 November 2019
16:30

Ecuador	0–1	Italy
	Report	Oristanio 76'

Estádio Kléber Andrade, Cariacica
Attendance: 2,014
Referee: Chris Beath (Australia)

7 November 2019
20:00

Paraguay	3–2	Argentina
Cano 58' (o.g.); Torres 73'; D. Duarte 86'	Report	Zeballos 27'; Godoy 42'

Estádio Kléber Andrade, Cariacica
Attendance: 3,957
Referee: Georgi Kabakov (Bulgaria)

=== Quarter-finals ===
10 November 2019
16:30

Netherlands	4–1	Paraguay
Hoever 30'; Hansen 40'; Braaf 78'; Ünüvar 86'	Report	D. Duarte 45+1'

Estádio Kléber Andrade, Cariacica
Attendance: 5,882
Referee: Khamis Al-Marri (Qatar)

10 November 2019
20:00

South Korea	0–1	Mexico
	Report	Ávila 77'

Estádio Kléber Andrade, Cariacica
Attendance: 5,087
Referee: Diego Haro (Peru)

11 November 2019
16:30

Spain	1–6	France
Valera 9'	Report	Kouassi 21'; Mbuku 36'; Lihadji 46'; Pembélé 54'; Rutter 59'; Aouchiche 90+3'

Estádio Olímpico, Goiânia
Attendance: 1,049
Referee: István Kovács (Romania)

11 November 2019
20:00

Italy	0–2	Brazil
	Report	Patryck 6'; Peglow 40'

Estádio Olímpico, Goiânia
Attendance: 8,743
Referee: Adonai Escobedo (Mexico)

=== Semi-finals ===
14 November 2019
16:30

Mexico	1–1	Netherlands
Álvarez 79'	Report	Muñoz 74' (o.g.)
Penalties
Álvarez (penalty missed); Muñoz (penalty scored); A. Gómez (penalty scored); Pizzuto (penalty scored); J. Gómez (penalty missed); Guzmán (penalty scored)	4–3	(penalty scored) Maatsen; (penalty scored) Ünüvar; (penalty missed) Taabouni; (penalty missed) Braaf; (penalty scored) Hansen; (penalty missed) Regeer

Estádio Bezerrão, Gama
Attendance: 1,122
Referee: Guillermo Guerrero (Ecuador)

14 November 2019
20:00

France	2–3	Brazil
Kalimuendo 7'; Mbuku 13'	Report	Kaio 62'; Veron 76'; Lázaro 89'

Estádio Bezerrão, Gama
Attendance: 13,587
Referee: Iván Barton (El Salvador)

=== Third place match ===
17 November 2019
15:00

Netherlands	1–3	France
Taabouni 15'	Report	Kalimuendo 22', 54', 62'

Estádio Bezerrão, Gama
Attendance: 1,232
Referee: Andreas Ekberg (Sweden)

=== Final ===
17 November 2019
19:00

Mexico	1–2	Brazil
González 66'	Report	Kaio 84' (pen.); Lázaro 90+3'

Estádio Bezerrão, Gama
Attendance: 13,843
Referee: Andris Treimanis (Latvia)

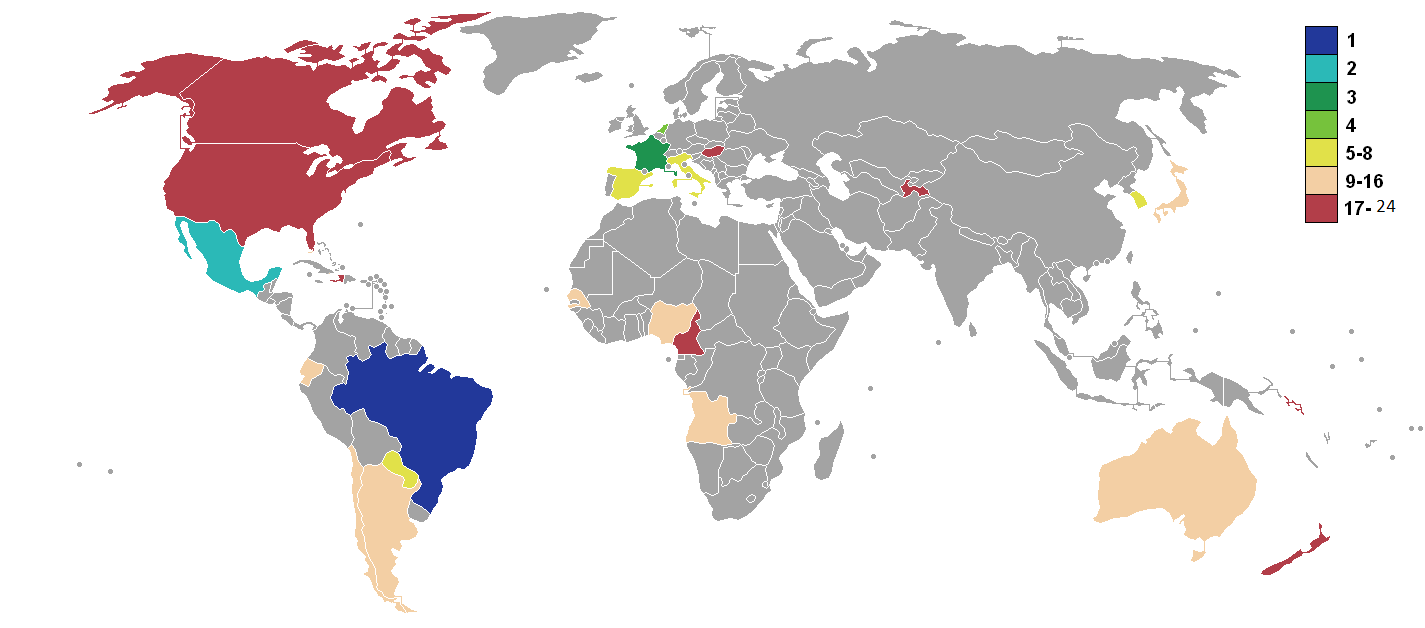
Results of the 2019 FIFA U-17 World Cup per country.

== Awards ==
The following awards were given at the conclusion of the tournament. They were all sponsored by Adidas, except for the FIFA Fair Play Trophy

Golden Ball	Silver Ball	Bronze Ball
(Brazil) Gabriel Veron	(France) Adil Aouchiche	(Mexico) Eugenio Pizzuto
Golden Boot	Silver Boot	Bronze Boot
(Netherlands) Sontje Hansen (6 goals, 3 assists, 528 minutes played)	(France) Nathanaël Mbuku (5 goals, 1 assist, 487 minutes played)	(Brazil) Kaio Jorge (5 goals, 1 assist, 559 minutes played)
Golden Glove
(Brazil) Matheus Donelli
FIFA Fair Play Trophy
Ecuador

== Final ranking ==
As per statistical convention in football, matches decided in extra time are counted as wins and losses, while matches decided by penalty shoot-outs are counted as draws.

Pos	Team	Pld	W	D	L	GF	GA	GD	Pts	Final result
1	Brazil	7	7	0	0	19	6	+13	21	Champions
2	Mexico	7	3	2	2	14	5	+9	11	Runners-up
3	France	7	6	0	1	22	6	+16	18	Third place
4	Netherlands	7	3	1	3	14	12	+2	10	Fourth place
5	Paraguay	5	3	1	1	13	7	+6	10	Eliminated in Quarter-finals
6	Spain	5	3	1	1	10	8	+2	10	Eliminated in Quarter-finals
7	Italy	5	3	0	2	9	5	+4	9	Eliminated in Quarter-finals
8	South Korea	5	3	0	2	6	6	0	9	Eliminated in Quarter-finals
9	Argentina	4	2	1	1	8	5	+3	7	Eliminated in Round of 16
10	Japan	4	2	1	1	4	2	+2	7	Eliminated in Round of 16
11	Senegal	4	2	0	2	8	5	+3	6	Eliminated in Round of 16
12	Nigeria	4	2	0	2	9	9	0	6	Eliminated in Round of 16
13	Angola	4	2	0	2	4	5	−1	6	Eliminated in Round of 16
14	Ecuador	4	2	0	2	6	9	−3	6	Eliminated in Round of 16
15	Australia	4	1	1	2	5	9	−4	4	Eliminated in Round of 16
16	Chile	4	1	0	3	7	9	−2	3	Eliminated in Round of 16
17	New Zealand	3	1	0	2	2	5	−3	3	Eliminated in Group stage
18	Tajikistan	3	1	0	2	3	8	−5	3	Eliminated in Group stage
19	Hungary	3	0	1	2	6	9	−3	1	Eliminated in Group stage
20	United States	3	0	1	2	1	8	−7	1	Eliminated in Group stage
21	Haiti	3	0	0	3	3	8	−5	0	Eliminated in Group stage
22	Canada	3	0	0	3	2	7	−5	0	Eliminated in Group stage
23	Cameroon	3	0	0	3	1	6	−5	0	Eliminated in Group stage
24	Solomon Islands	3	0	0	3	0	20	−20	0	Eliminated in Group stage

== Goalscorers ==
There were 177 goals scored in 52 matches, for an average of 3.4 goals per match.

6 goals

- (Netherlands) Sontje Hansen

5 goals

- (Brazil) Kaio Jorge
- (France) Arnaud Kalimuendo
- (France) Nathanaël Mbuku

4 goals

- (Australia) Noah Botic
- (Mexico) Efraín Álvarez
- (Paraguay) Diego Duarte

3 goals

- (Argentina) Matías Godoy
- (Brazil) João Peglow
- (Brazil) Gabriel Veron
- (France) Isaac Lihadji
- (France) Georginio Rutter
- (Italy) Wilfried Gnonto
- (Nigeria) Ibrahim Said
- (Paraguay) Diego Joel Torres
- (Senegal) Pape Sarr
- (Spain) Roberto Navarro
- (Spain) Germán Valera

2 goals

- (Angola) Zini
- (Argentina) Franco Orozco
- (Brazil) Lázaro
- (Brazil) Talles Magno
- (Brazil) Diego Rosa
- (Canada) Jacen Russell-Rowe
- (Chile) Joan Cruz
- (Ecuador) Johan Mina
- (France) Timothée Pembélé
- (Hungary) András Németh
- (Japan) Jun Nishikawa
- (Japan) Yamato Wakatsuki
- (Mexico) Alí Ávila
- (Mexico) Alejandro Gómez
- (Mexico) Israel Luna
- (Netherlands) Jayden Braaf
- (Netherlands) Mohamed Taabouni
- (New Zealand) Matthew Garbett
- (Nigeria) Samson Tijani
- (Senegal) Aliou Balde
- (Senegal) Souleymane Faye
- (South Korea) Choi Min-seo

1 goal

- (Angola) David
- (Argentina) Francisco Flores
- (Argentina) Juan Pablo Krilanovich
- (Argentina) Exequiel Zeballos
- (Australia) Caleb Watts
- (Brazil) Patryck
- (Cameroon) François Bere
- (Chile) Alexander Oroz
- (Chile) Luis Rojas
- (Chile) Gonzalo Tapia
- (Chile) David Tati
- (Ecuador) John Mercado
- (Ecuador) Erick Plúas
- (Ecuador) Pedro Vite
- (France) Lucien Agoumé
- (France) Adil Aouchiche
- (France) Tanguy Kouassi
- (France) Enzo Millot
- (Haiti) Samuel Jeanty
- (Haiti) Kervens Jolicoeur
- (Haiti) Carl Sainte
- (Hungary) Péter Baráth
- (Hungary) György Komáromi
- (Hungary) Sámuel Major
- (Hungary) Ákos Zuigéber
- (Italy) Andrea Capone
- (Italy) Nicolò Cudrig
- (Italy) Gaetano Oristanio
- (Italy) Lorenzo Pirola
- (Italy) Franco Tongya
- (Italy) Iyenoma Udogie
- (Mexico) Bryan González
- (Mexico) Santiago Muñoz
- (Mexico) Eugenio Pizzuto
- (Mexico) Luis Puente
- (Netherlands) Naoufal Bannis
- (Netherlands) Ki-Jana Hoever
- (Netherlands) Naci Ünüvar
- (Nigeria) Oluwatimilehin Adeniyi
- (Nigeria) Usman Ibrahim
- (Nigeria) Peter Olawale
- (Nigeria) Olakunle Olusegun
- (Paraguay) Fabio Barrios
- (Paraguay) Junior Noguera
- (Paraguay) Fernando Presentado
- (Paraguay) Júnior Quiñónez
- (Paraguay) Matías Segovia
- (Senegal) Amete Faye
- (South Korea) Eom Ji-sung
- (South Korea) Jeong Sang-bin
- (South Korea) Paik Sang-hoon
- (South Korea) Hong Sung-wook
- (Spain) Jordi Escobar
- (Spain) Ilaix Moriba
- (Spain) David Larrubia
- (Spain) Pablo Moreno
- (Tajikistan) Sharifbek Rahmatov
- (Tajikistan) Rustam Soirov
- (United States) Gianluca Busio

1 own goal

- (Argentina) Lautaro Cano (against Paraguay)
- (Australia) Anton Mlinaric (against Ecuador)
- (Canada) Kobe Franklin (against Brazil)
- (Haiti) Woodbens Ceneus (against Chile)
- (Mexico) Santiago Muñoz (against Netherlands)
- (New Zealand) Harry Bark (against Angola)
- (Nigeria) Daniel Jinadu (against Ecuador)
- (Spain) Álvaro Carrillo (against Tajikistan)

Source: FIFA

== Marketing ==
=== Sponsorships ===
FIFA partners	National Supporters
Adidas; Coca-Cola; Hyundai; Qatar Airways; Visa; Wanda Group	CIMED; Groupo Souza Lima; Semp

== See also ==
- 2019 Copa América
