= Coronel Nunes =

Brazilian sports executive

Coronel Nunes Antônio Carlos Nunes de Lima
- Coronel Nunes during a meeting of the CPI of Football in the Federal Senate, on 16 March 2016

President of the Brazilian Football Confederation
- In office 15 December 2017 – 9 April 2019
- Preceded by: Marco Polo Del Nero
- Succeeded by: Rogério Caboclo
- In office 6 June 2021 – 25 August 2021
- Preceded by: Rogério Caboclo
- Succeeded by: Ednaldo Rodrigues

Mayor of Monte Alegre
- In office November 1977 – September 1980

Personal details
- Born: 21 November 1938 Monte Allegre, Pará
- Died: 13 September 2026 (aged 87) Belém, Pará
- Party: ARENA

Military service
- Allegiance: Brazilian Air Force; Military Police of the State of Pará
- Years of service: 1957–1966 (FAB); 1967–1991 (PM)
- Rank: Corporal (FAB); Colonel (PM)

Antônio Carlos Nunes de Lima, commonly known as Coronel Nunes (21 November 1938 – 13 September 2026) was a Brazilian military officer, politician, and sports executive. He served twice as president of the Brazilian Football Confederation (CBF).

== Biography ==
Coronel Nunes served in the Brazilian Air Force from 1957 to 1966, when he was dismissed on suspicion of collaborating with opponents of the Military Dictatorship in Brazil. For this reason, in 2016, he received R$ 14,700 as a political amnesty recipient, in addition to monthly payments and a retroactive compensation of R$ 243,416.25. He joined the Military Police in 1967. In May 1971, he was appointed commander of the Independent Company of the Military Police of Santarém (CIPM, now the 3rd PM Battalion/PA), where he remained until April 1974. In 1977, he was appointed as an indirect mayor of the city of Monte Alegre in Pará. He retired as a colonel in February 1991.

He served as president of the Brazilian Football Confederation (CBF) from 2017 to 2019. As a representative of the CBF during the 2018 FIFA World Cup in Russia, Coronel Nunes caused controversy during the 2026 FIFA World Cup bid by being the only representative of the CONMEBOL to vote in favor of Morocco. This act created discomfort within the South American entity, as it contradicted an earlier promise to vote for the joint bid by Canada, United States, and Mexico, which ultimately won the bid. He justified his choice by stating that Morocco had never hosted a World Cup, whereas the United States (in 1994) and Mexico (in 1970 and 1986) had already hosted the tournament on other occasions. On 6 June 2021, he reassumed the presidency of the CBF after the removal of Rogério Caboclo.
