= 2027 FIFA Women's World Cup bids =

Football World Cup host nation bids

The 2027 FIFA Women's World Cup bidding process was the process used by FIFA to select the host for the 2027 FIFA Women's World Cup. Brazil won the hosting rights on 17 May 2024.

== Host selection ==
On 23 March 2023, FIFA launched the bidding process for the 2027 FIFA Women's World Cup. The key dates included:

- 21 April 2023: Member associations to submit their expressions of interest to host the 2027 Women's World Cup
- 19 May 2023: Member associations to confirm their interest in bidding to host the Women's World Cup by submitting the bidding agreement
- August 2023: Bid workshop and observer programme to take place during the 2023 FIFA Women's World Cup
- 8 December 2023: Member associations to submit their bids to FIFA
- February 2024: FIFA to organise on-site inspection visits to bidding countries
- 7 May 2024: Publication of FIFA's bid evaluation report
- 2nd quarter: Designation of bids by the FIFA Council
- 26 June 2024: Appointment of the 2027 Women's World Cup host(s) by the FIFA Congress in Bangkok

== Bids ==
FIFA received three bids to host the tournament upon their 8 December 2023 submission deadline: a joint bid from the German, Royal Belgian, and Royal Dutch Football Associations, a sole bid from the Brazilian Football Confederation, and a joint bid from the Mexican and United States Soccer Federations. The Mexico–United States bid was withdrawn prior to the appointment of host(s) on 17 May 2024.

=== Belgium–Germany–Netherlands ===
On 19 October 2020, the football associations of Belgium, Germany, and the Netherlands announced their intention to jointly bid for the 2027 FIFA Women's World Cup. The intention is for the three countries to make further agreements about the organization before the end of this year and to record this in a covenant. Belgium and the Netherlands jointly hosted the UEFA European Championship in 2000, with Belgium having previously hosted in 1972. Germany hosted the FIFA Women's World Cup in 2011 and the UEFA European Women's Championship in 2001. Germany also hosted the FIFA Men's World Cup in 1974 and 2006, the men's Euro in 1988, and will do so again in 2024. Germany and the Netherlands co-hosted several matches in the multi-national UEFA Euro 2020. The Netherlands hosted the Women's Euro in 2017. The host cities of Germany are Dortmund, Gelsenkirchen, Düsseldorf and Cologne, all in the state of North Rhine-Westphalia. The Dutch host cities are Amsterdam, Eindhoven, Enschede, Heerenveen and Rotterdam. The Belgian host cities are Genk, Anderlecht, Gent and Charleroi.

=== Brazil ===
Venues nominated in the Brazil's bid.

The Brazilian Football Confederation (CBF), along with Rio de Janeiro city, have expressed interest in participating in the election for the 2027 World Cup. The country was already one of the finalists for the 2023 edition, but had to withdraw its candidacy due to the lack of support from the federal government, in addition to the financial crisis caused by the COVID-19 pandemic. The project is part of a study carried out by the Rio Convention & Visitors Bureau (RCV), which also makes possible other events with Olympic sports and FIFA tournaments in Rio de Janeiro until 2033, including the 2031 Pan American Games, using the city again as host (since it hosted the competition in 2007), reusing the structures used in the 2016 Summer Olympics and Paralympics. The country has twice hosted the men's version of the World Cup, in 1950 and 2014, in addition to the 2013 Confederations Cup.

On 1 March 2023, the city of São Paulo expressed interest in participating in the election with Rio de Janeiro, offering the Arena Corinthians and Allianz Parque to receive the matches. The next day, CBF President Ednaldo Rodrigues sent a letter to FIFA, confirming the country's intention to compete in the 2027 World Cup. Other Brazilian cities can also participate in the project, as the event involves the entire country. On 7 March the Brazilian Minister of Sports, Ana Moser, confirmed the country's bid to host the tournament. Then, the cities of Salvador, Brasília, Cuiabá, Belém, Manaus and Fortaleza also offered to host the World Cup in an event on SAFs and the football capital market, organized by the Getúlio Vargas Foundation (FGV) on 11 March. Among the capitals that offered, only Belém did not host the last men's World Cup in the country in 2014, losing its place to Manaus.

On 28 September 2023, the CBF confirmed the cities of Belo Horizonte, Brasília, Cuiabá, Fortaleza, Manaus, Porto Alegre, Recife, Rio de Janeiro, São Paulo and Salvador as the capitals that will make up the official Brazilian candidacy document, with Belém leaving the project and the inclusion of the capital of Minas Gerais and Rio Grande do Sul, increasing the number of candidates for the World Cup to ten. The locations are similar to those of the 2014 men's edition, but without the inclusion of Curitiba and Natal. The plan also foresees the opening match at the Estádio Nacional Mané Garrincha and the final at Maracanã, while in the cities of Belo Horizonte, Porto Alegre and São Paulo, there was an uncertainty between two stadiums. In the capital of Minas Gerais, the dispute would be between Mineirão and Arena MRV, while in the capital of Rio Grande do Sul the dispute is between Estádio Beira-Rio and Arena do Grêmio and in the Brazilian megalopolis the dispute is between Neo Química Arena and Allianz Parque, with Mineirão, Beira Rio and Neo Química Arena being the favorite stadiums for having hosted the men's version games in 2014. A successful bid would be South America's first time hosting the Women's World Cup.

=== Evaluation report ===
On 7 May 2024, 10 days before the vote, the evaluation report was released. Brazil's bid was deemed to have better stadiums while the European bid promised a compact tournament. Overall, Brazil's bid scored higher than the European bid.

==== Evaluation score ====
2027 FIFA Women's World Cup evaluation report
Bidding nation(s)	Evaluation score
Brazil	4/5
Belgium, Germany and Netherlands	3.7/5

=== Host selection ===
On 17 May 2024 in Bangkok during the 74th FIFA Congress, FIFA announced that Brazil would become the 2027 Women's World Cup host, making this the first FIFA Women's World Cup in both South America and Latin America.

==== Voting ====
74th FIFA Congress vote
Nation	Vote
Nation	Round 1
Brazil	119
Belgium, Germany and Netherlands	78
None of the bids	3
Abstentions	7
Total votes	207
Majority required	104

=== 2027 Women's World Cup host election results ===
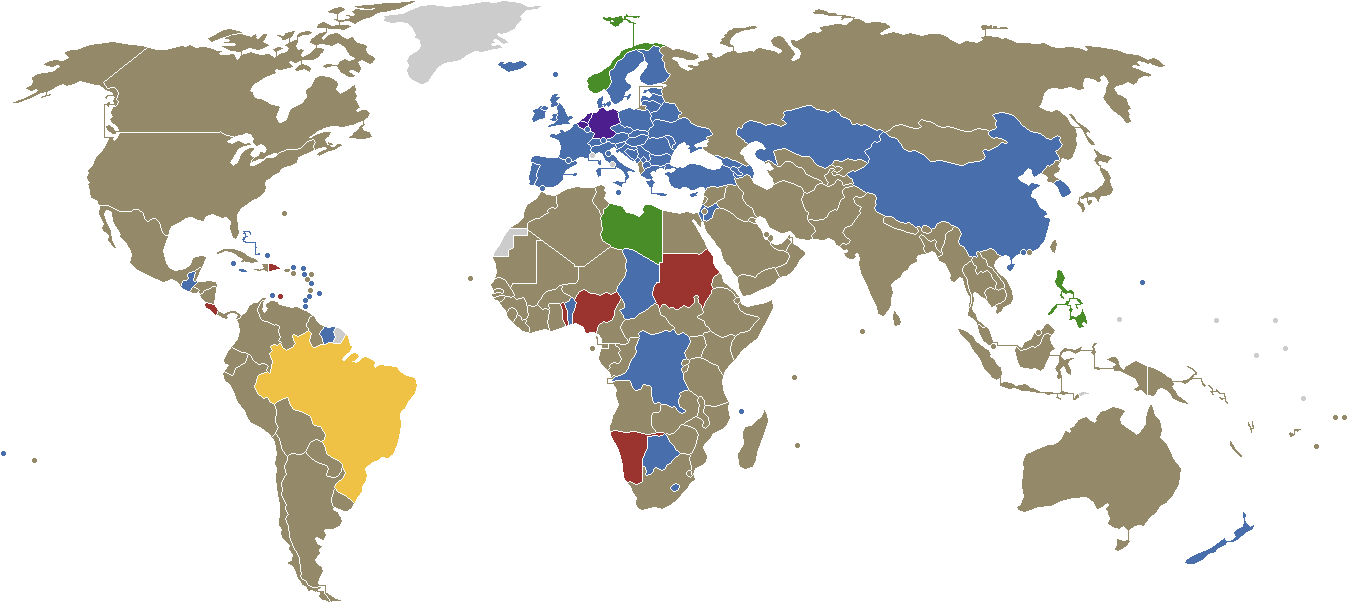
Voting results: Allowed to vote / Banned from voting; Voted for Brazilian bid / Brazil; Voted for BNG bid / Belgium–Germany–Netherlands; Voted for neither / Not a FIFA member; Abstained from voting

The voting took place on 17 May 2024, during the 74th FIFA Congress in Bangkok, and it was open to all 207 eligible members. (Note: The four bidding nations, Brazil, Belgium, Germany, and the Netherlands were ineligible to vote.)

The Brazil bid won receiving 119 votes, while the Belgium–Germany–Netherlands bid received 78 votes. No representative within their home confederation CONMEBOL voted against the Brazil bid whilst two representatives within their home confederation UEFA voted against the Belgium–Germany–Netherlands bid. Curaçao, Costa Rica, Dominican Republic, Namibia, Nigeria, Sudan, and Togo abstained while Norway and the Philippines were unable to vote due to technical difficulties and Libya did not vote for either bid.

=== Election results by association ===
Conf.	Football association	Vote			ABS
Conf.	Football association	BRA	BNG	NAN	ABS
AFC	Afghanistan	BRA			
AFC	Australia	BRA			
AFC	Bangladesh	BRA			
AFC	Bahrain	BRA			
AFC	Bhutan	BRA			
AFC	Brunei Darussalam	BRA			
AFC	Cambodia	BRA			
AFC	China		BNG		
AFC	Chinese Taipei	BRA			
AFC	(Timor-Leste) East Timor	BRA			
AFC	Guam		BNG		
AFC	Hong Kong	BRA			
AFC	India	BRA			
AFC	Indonesia	BRA			
AFC	Iran	BRA			
AFC	Iraq	BRA			
AFC	Japan	BRA			
AFC	Jordan		BNG		
AFC	Kuwait	BRA			
AFC	Kyrgyzstan	BRA			
AFC	Laos	BRA			
AFC	Lebanon	BRA			
AFC	Macau		BNG		
AFC	Malaysia	BRA			
AFC	Maldives	BRA			
AFC	Mongolia	BRA			
AFC	Myanmar	BRA			
AFC	Nepal	BRA			
AFC	North Korea	BRA			
AFC	Oman	BRA			
AFC	Pakistan	BRA			
AFC	Palestine	BRA			
AFC	Philippines			N (Note: A technical issue was experienced by the Philippines Football Federation that resulted in their inability to cast their vote)	
AFC	Qatar	BRA			
AFC	Saudi Arabia	BRA			
AFC	Singapore	BRA			
AFC	Sri Lanka	BRA			
AFC	South Korea		BNG		
AFC	Syria	BRA			
AFC	Tajikistan	BRA			
AFC	Thailand	BRA			
AFC	Turkmenistan	BRA			
AFC	United Arab Emirates	BRA			
AFC	Uzbekistan	BRA			
AFC	Vietnam	BRA			
AFC	Yemen	BRA			
AFC subtotal: 46 valid ballots		40	5	1	0
CAF	Algeria	BRA			
CAF	Angola	BRA			
CAF	Benin		BNG		
CAF	Botswana		BNG		
CAF	Burkina Faso	BRA			
CAF	Burundi	BRA			
CAF	Cameroon	BRA			
CAF	Cape Verde	BRA			
CAF	Central African Republic	BRA			
CAF	Chad		BNG		
CAF	Comoros		BNG		
CAF	(Republic of the Congo) Congo	BRA			
CAF	(Democratic Republic of the Congo) DR Congo		BNG		
CAF	Djibouti	BRA			
CAF	Egypt	BRA			
CAF	Equatorial Guinea	BRA			
CAF	Eritrea	BRA			
CAF	Eswatini	BRA			
CAF	Ethiopia	BRA			
CAF	Gabon	BRA			
CAF	(The Gambia) Gambia	BRA			
CAF	Ghana	BRA			
CAF	Guinea	BRA			
CAF	Guinea-Bissau	BRA			
CAF	Ivory Coast	BRA			
CAF	Kenya	BRA			
CAF	Lesotho		BNG		
CAF	Liberia	BRA			
CAF	Libya			N	
CAF	Madagascar	BRA			
CAF	Malawi	BRA			
CAF	Mali	BRA			
CAF	Mauritania	BRA			
CAF	Mauritius	BRA			
CAF	Morocco	BRA			
CAF	Mozambique	BRA			
CAF	Namibia				A
CAF	Niger	BRA			
CAF	Nigeria				A
CAF	Rwanda	BRA			
CAF	São Tomé and Príncipe	BRA			
CAF	Senegal	BRA			
CAF	Seychelles	BRA			
CAF	Sierra Leone	BRA			
CAF	Somalia	BRA			
CAF	South Africa	BRA			
CAF	South Sudan	BRA			
CAF	Sudan				A
CAF	Tanzania	BRA			
CAF	Togo				A
CAF	Tunisia	BRA			
CAF	Uganda	BRA			
CAF	Zambia	BRA			
CAF	Zimbabwe	BRA			
CAF subtotal: 54 valid ballots		43	6	1	4
CONCACAF	Anguilla		BNG		
CONCACAF	Antigua and Barbuda	BRA			
CONCACAF	Aruba		BNG		
CONCACAF	(The Bahamas) Bahamas		BNG		
CONCACAF	Barbados		BNG		
CONCACAF	Belize	BRA			
CONCACAF	Bermuda	BRA			
CONCACAF	British Virgin Islands		BNG		
CONCACAF	Canada	BRA			
CONCACAF	Cayman Islands		BNG		
CONCACAF	Costa Rica				A
CONCACAF	Cuba	BRA			
CONCACAF	Curaçao				A
CONCACAF	Dominica		BNG		
CONCACAF	Dominican Republic				A
CONCACAF	El Salvador	BRA			
CONCACAF	Grenada		BNG		
CONCACAF	Guatemala		BNG		
CONCACAF	Guyana	BRA			
CONCACAF	Haiti	BRA			
CONCACAF	Honduras	BRA			
CONCACAF	Jamaica		BNG		
CONCACAF	Mexico	BRA			
CONCACAF	Montserrat	BRA			
CONCACAF	Nicaragua	BRA			
CONCACAF	Panama	BRA			
CONCACAF	Puerto Rico	BRA			
CONCACAF	Saint Kitts and Nevis		BNG		
CONCACAF	Saint Lucia	BRA			
CONCACAF	Saint Vincent and the Grenadines		BNG		
CONCACAF	Suriname		BNG		
CONCACAF	Trinidad and Tobago		BNG		
CONCACAF	Turks and Caicos Islands		BNG		
CONCACAF	United States	BRA			
CONCACAF	(United States Virgin Islands) U.S. Virgin Islands	BRA			
CONCACAF subtotal: 35 valid ballots		17	15	0	3
CONMEBOL	Argentina	BRA			
CONMEBOL	Bolivia	BRA			
CONMEBOL	Chile	BRA			
CONMEBOL	Colombia	BRA			
CONMEBOL	Ecuador	BRA			
CONMEBOL	Paraguay	BRA			
CONMEBOL	Peru	BRA			
CONMEBOL	Uruguay	BRA			
CONMEBOL	Venezuela	BRA			
CONMEBOL subtotal: 9 valid ballots		9	0	0	0
OFC	American Samoa	BRA			
OFC	Cook Islands		BNG		
OFC	Fiji	BRA			
OFC	New Caledonia	BRA			
OFC	New Zealand		BNG		
OFC	Papua New Guinea	BRA			
OFC	Samoa	BRA			
OFC	Solomon Islands	BRA			
OFC	(French Polynesia) Tahiti	BRA			
OFC	Tonga	BRA			
OFC	Vanuatu	BRA			
OFC subtotal: 11 valid ballots		9	2	0	0
UEFA	Albania		BNG		
UEFA	Andorra		BNG		
UEFA	Armenia		BNG		
UEFA	Austria		BNG		
UEFA	Azerbaijan		BNG		
UEFA	Belarus		BNG		
UEFA	Bosnia and Herzegovina		BNG		
UEFA	Bulgaria		BNG		
UEFA	Croatia		BNG		
UEFA	Cyprus		BNG		
UEFA	(Czech Republic) Czechia		BNG		
UEFA	Denmark		BNG		
UEFA	England		BNG		
UEFA	Estonia		BNG		
UEFA	Faroe Islands		BNG		
UEFA	Finland		BNG		
UEFA	France		BNG		
UEFA	(Georgia (country)) Georgia		BNG		
UEFA	Gibraltar		BNG		
UEFA	Greece		BNG		
UEFA	Hungary		BNG		
UEFA	Iceland		BNG		
UEFA	Israel		BNG		
UEFA	Italy		BNG		
UEFA	Kazakhstan		BNG		
UEFA	Kosovo		BNG		
UEFA	Latvia		BNG		
UEFA	Liechtenstein		BNG		
UEFA	Lithuania		BNG		
UEFA	Luxembourg		BNG		
UEFA	Malta		BNG		
UEFA	Moldova		BNG		
UEFA	Montenegro		BNG		
UEFA	North Macedonia		BNG		
UEFA	Northern Ireland		BNG		
UEFA	Norway			N (Note: The Norwegian Football Federation experienced a technical issue that resulted in the inability to cast their vote, and had they been able to submit such vote, Norway would have submitted a vote for the BNG.)	
UEFA	Poland		BNG		
UEFA	Portugal		BNG		
UEFA	Republic of Ireland		BNG		
UEFA	Romania		BNG		
UEFA	Russia	BRA			
UEFA	San Marino		BNG		
UEFA	Scotland		BNG		
UEFA	Serbia		BNG		
UEFA	Slovakia		BNG		
UEFA	Slovenia		BNG		
UEFA	Spain		BNG		
UEFA	Sweden		BNG		
UEFA	Switzerland		BNG		
UEFA	Turkey		BNG		
UEFA	Ukraine		BNG		
UEFA	Wales		BNG		
UEFA subtotal: 52 valid ballots		1	50	1	0
Total: 207 valid ballots (100%)		119 (57.5%)	78 (37.7%)	3 (1.4%)	7 (3.3%)

== Withdrawn bids and other expressions of interest ==
=== Mexico–United States joint bid ===
U.S. Soccer presidents Carlos Cordeiro and Cindy Parlow Cone made hosting the FIFA Women's World Cup a priority during their respective administrations, focusing on potential bids for the 2027 and 2031 editions. Concurrently, the Mexican Football Federation (FMF) expressed an interest in hosting the 2027 edition. The two federations allied, announcing in April 2023 their intention to submit a join bid to host the 2027 edition.

Taking place after the 2026 Men's World Cup in Canada, Mexico, and the United States, they planned to host the tournament across sixteen venues: ten of the United States' eleven 2026 stadiums sans SoFi Stadium, which was replaced by the Rose Bowl, and all three of Mexico's 2026 stadiums in addition to the Estadio Corregidora and Estadio León. While the FMF and U.S. Soccer were one of three parties to submit a bid for the tournament, projecting revenues exceeding US$3 billion, they withdrew in April 2024, just weeks before the host selection, refocusing their efforts on a bid to host the 2031 edition instead.

=== Chile ===
After the successful participation at the 2019 FIFA Women's World Cup in France, then-sports minister Pauline Kantor, announced the intention to propose a bid for 2027 edition. To enhance the bid, Chile officially made its women's domestic league fully professional after 2022–23 season, with the first professional season played in 2023. Chile have hosted numerous FIFA tournaments, including: 1962 FIFA World Cup, 1987 FIFA World Youth Championship, 2008 FIFA U-20 Women's World Cup and the 2015 FIFA U-17 World Cup. Chile also hosted the 2023 Pan American Games in Santiago. Chile will host the 2025 FIFA U-20 World Cup.

=== Italy ===
On 17 February 2021, President of the Italian Football Federation, Gabriele Gravina, hinted that Italy might seek to host the 2027 Women's World Cup, and has underlined a prolonged plan to improve the status of women's football in Italy, including the professionalisation of the Serie A from autumn 2022 and finally making Italian female footballers full time professionals.

=== Nordic bid ===
The Nordic countries (Denmark, Faroe Islands, Finland, Iceland, Norway, and Sweden) once expressed interest in a combined bid to host the World Cup on 22 February 2019. Sweden is the only Nordic nation to host the senior World Cup, with the 1958 FIFA World Cup and the 1995 FIFA Women's World Cup being in Sweden, becoming the first country to host both men's and women's World Cups. In June 2019, the Nordic Council declared its support.

=== South Africa ===
Motivated by the success of the country's recent participation in FIFA women's tournaments, the South African Football Association (SAFA) previously submitted a bid for the 2023 FIFA Women's World Cup, but withdrew its bid in December 2019. SAFA CEO Hay Mokoena stated that South Africa would consider bidding for 2027 after the women's league and national team become more competitive. South Africa has hosted the 2009 FIFA Confederations Cup and the 2010 FIFA World Cup and could use the infrastructure that was built for the tournament. In September 2022, South Africa announced its bid to host the 2027 women's edition. A successful bid would be Africa's first time hosting the Women's World Cup. They sought to host the tournament in eight of the ten venues used for the 2010 FIFA World Cup, with the Ellis Park and Loftus Versfeld Stadium, being replaced by the Orlando Stadium and Griqua Park.

After violence and gunshots during the 2022–23 SAFA Second Division playoffs, SAFA expressed concern about the impact of the violence on the bid.

On 24 November 2023, SAFA decided to withdraw its bid to host the tournament and instead focus on submitting a bid for the 2031 tournament.
