= Samir Xaud =

Brazilian sports executive (born 1984)

26th President of the Brazilian Football Confederation
- Incumbent
- Assumed office 25 May 2025
- Preceded by: Ednaldo Rodrigues (as president); Fernando Sarney (as interim)

Personal details
- Born: Samir de Araújo Xaud; February 25, 1984 (age 42) Boa Vista, Roraima, Brazil

Samir de Araújo Xaud (born 25 February 1984) is a Brazilian doctor, businessman and sports executive. He is currently president of the Brazilian Football Confederation.

== Personal life ==
Born in Boa Vista in 1984, Xaud is the youngest of four children born to Ilma de Araujo Xaud and José Gama Xaud, a traditional middle-class family from Roraima. His mother was secretary of education for the Boa Vista city government during the Ottomar Pinto administration, between 1997 and 2000, and also for the state government during the same politician's term, between 2004 and 2007. She was also vice-rector of the Universidade Estadual de Roraima from 2007 to 2015. His father, better known as Zeca Xaud, presided over the Roraima Football Federation for decades and won, in an election in 2023, his 14th consecutive term as head of the local entity. In addition to his work as a sports director, Zeca is an accountant by training and was a civil servant for the Boa Vista city government.

== Career ==
During his adolescence, Xaud played soccer for local teams as a goalkeeper and even played professionally for Atlético Roraima in the early 2000s, but stopped playing to dedicate himself to his studies. He graduated in medicine from the Nilton Lins University and obtained a specialization in infectious diseases from the Federal University of Roraima and in sports medicine from the BWS Institute. He was the director of the General Hospital of Roraima. Also active as a businessman in various fields, he is the owner of a multi-sport training center. Since 2019, the professional has also provided active services as a doctor for local clubs, mainly São Raimundo, when they compete in national competitions. In 2023, after his father's re-election to the FRF, Samir Xaud became the entity's manager and, in practice, the de facto president of the Roraima federation.

Xaud attempted to enter politics on two occasions. In 2018, he ran for the Green Party for a seat as state deputy in the Legislative Assembly of Roraima in the 2018 elections, having obtained 2,069 votes and won the fourth alternate position. In the 2022 elections, this time running for federal deputy for the Brazilian Democratic Movement, he finished as first alternate with 4,816 votes.

In January 2025, Xaud was elected to preside over the FRF for the four-year period 2027–2031, succeeding his father, Zeca Xaud, a leader who had led the entity uninterruptedly for four decades. With the fall of Ednaldo Rodrigues from the presidency of the Brazilian Football Confederation in May 2025, he became the only candidate to take over the highest football organization in Brazil. Xaud was the first to register for the contest, having obtained the support of 25 federations and 10 clubs. As CBF rules require the endorsement of at least eight state federations for registration, Xaud's ticket made any other candidacy unfeasible, as only the São Paulo Football Federation and the Mato Grosso Football Federation did not endorse it. Thus, the doctor was elected as the 26th president of the CBF for a term until 2029. Although he was the only candidate, Xaud did not achieve unanimous votes, due to the boycott of 20 clubs and the São Paulo Federation of the election.

== Controversies ==
Between 2016 and 2017, Xaud was the target of labor lawsuits in Boa Vista related to Difratelli Móveis, a furniture store in the capital of Roraima in which he was a partner with his wife Natalia. In the lawsuits, company employees claim that their salaries and proportional severance payments (such as vacation pay and 13th salary) were not paid in full and also report failure to pay the Severance Pay Fund and retention of work cards. Because of this, the court ordered the seizure of vehicles and properties and the search for bank balances in Xaud's name until at least R$24,000 in compensation was paid, through an agreement.

In September 2020, Samir Xaud was suspended for two years from his role as a medical expert at the Court of Justice of the State of Roraima for medical error. In 2017, the doctor had only examined the arm of a motorcyclist who was requesting mandatory insurance compensation for permanent leg injury after an accident in Boa Vista. Xaud ignored successive requests from the local Public Defender's Office to clarify the case, which led the TJRR to decide to exclude Samir from the court's general registry of experts for a period of two years. Xaud denies that the error occurred.

In March 2021, Xaud attempted to regularize land ownership on a plot of land located in an environmental area in Rorainópolis. Claiming to have owned the land since 2008, Xaud registered the deed of ownership of the Paraíso Perdido Farm at the notary's office, approximately 13 years after obtaining ownership. Days after the application, the farm was registered in the Rural Environmental Registry and, in May of that year, Xaud himself filed a request with the superintendence of the National Institute of Colonization and Agrarian Reform for land regularization of the farm. However, a technical opinion from the Roraima State Environmental Foundation canceled the registration for invading the Itapará-Boiaçu Reserve in 2023, as it had been created before Xaud's alleged ownership. Since the setback, Xaud has denied owning the farm.

In late 2023, the Public Prosecutor's Office of Roraima filed a lawsuit for administrative misconduct against Xaud, based on an investigation by the State Court of Auditors regarding the time when he was general director of the General Hospital of Roraima, from 2017 to 2020. The MP-RR pointed out a “fraudulent procedure” by managers of the public hospital – Xaud and six other managers would have simulated services to justify payments to the company Coopebras, through false documents, causing losses of R$1.38 million to the public coffers. The lawsuit is still ongoing and Xaud claims that the process does not show any evidence of wrongdoing on his part.

The doctor is also suspected of having covered up for ghost employees when he was deputy secretary of Health of Boa Vista, between May 2024 and March 2025. The Health Prosecutor's Office of the MP-RR states that, during the period in which Xaud was deputy secretary, there was no institutional contact with him, neither in person nor through official communications. In early 2025, after receiving an anonymous complaint that there were doctors receiving pay without working at the Santo Antônio Children's Hospital, part of the Boa Vista municipal network, the Health Prosecutor's Office notified the department, which promised to investigate the case and ensure the replacement of the hours not worked. However, both the incumbent secretary and Xaud, deputy secretary, left the department, and no investigation was opened.
