= Jesús Gil Manzano =

Spanish football referee (born 1984)

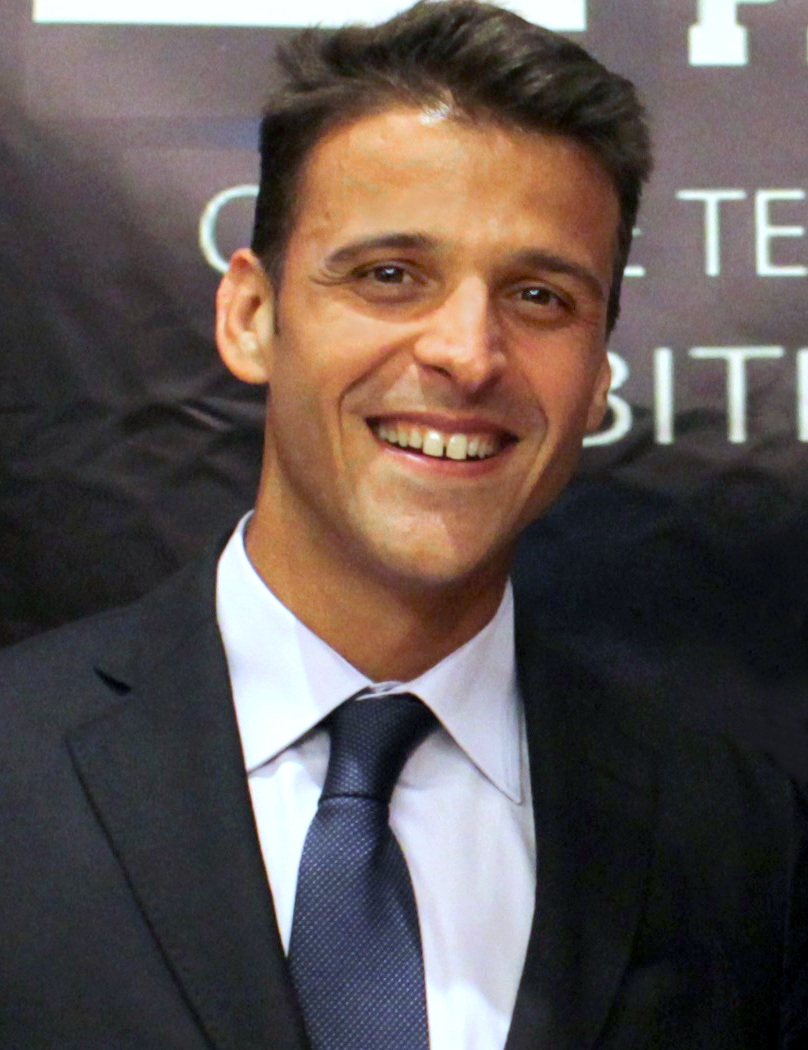
- Gil Manzano in 2017
- Full name: Jesús Gil Manzano
- Born: 4 February 1984 (age 42); Don Benito, Spain

Domestic
Years	League	Role
2001–2006	Tercera	Referee
2006–2009	Segunda B	Referee
2009–2012	Segunda	Referee
2012–	La Liga	Referee

International
Years	League	Role
2014–	FIFA listed	Referee

Jesús Gil Manzano (Spanish pronunciation: [xeˈsus ˈxil manˈθano]; born 4 February 1984) is a Spanish football referee. He officiates in the Spanish Primera División. He made his La Liga debut on 25 August 2012 in a game between Málaga and Mallorca. Gil Manzano also appeared in the 2013–14 Copa del Rey quarterfinals game between Racing de Santander and Real Sociedad, where Racing refused to play after one minute.

Following the game between Barcelona and Girona on 23 September 2018, that ended 2–2, Lionel Messi refused to shake his hand after the match. He has also refereed in top league matches of various countries, such as on 10 February 2019, in the derby PAOK - Olympiacos 3–1.

== Honours ==
- Vicente Acebedo Trophy (2017–18)

== Record ==
2021 Copa América – Brazil
Date	Match	Venue	Round
18 June 2021	Chile – Bolivia	Cuiabá	Group stage
23 June 2021	Ecuador – Peru	Goiânia	Group stage
3 July 2021	Uruguay – Colombia	Brasília	Quarter-finals
