= Bezerrão =

Brazilian football stadium

Estádio Walmir Campelo Bezerra
- Bezerrão
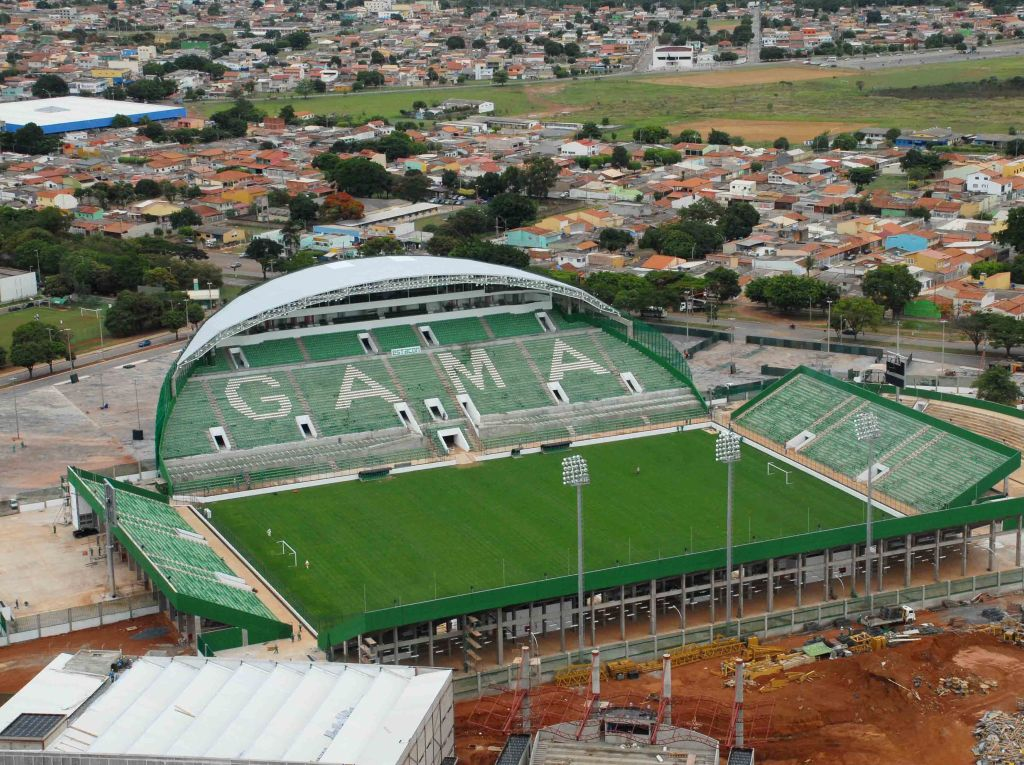
- Sisbrace
- Interactive map of Estádio Walmir Campelo Bezerra
- Full name: Estádio Walmir Campelo Bezerra
- Location: Gama, DF, Brazil
- Coordinates: 16°00′45″S 48°03′44″W
- Owner: Distrito Federal
- Capacity: 20,310
- Field size: 100 x 75 m

Construction
- Built: 1977
- Opened: October 9, 1977
- Architect: Ruy Ohtake

Tenant
- Sociedade Esportiva do Gama

Estádio Walmir Campelo Bezerra, usually known as Bezerrão, is a Brazilian football stadium, located at administrative region of Gama, in the Distrito Federal. It is currently used mostly for football matches. The stadium has a capacity of 20,000 people.

Bezerrão is owned by the Government of the Federal District and it is the stadium where Sociedade Esportiva do Gama sometimes plays its home matches. The stadium is named after Antônio Walmir Campelo Bezerra, who was the regional administrator of Gama during the stadium construction.

== History ==
In 1977, construction work on Bezerrão was completed. The inaugural match was played on October 9 of that year, when Botafogo beat Gama 3–1. The first goal of the stadium was scored by Botafogo's Gil.

The stadium's attendance record currently stands at 19,157, set on November 19, 2008 when Brazil beat Portugal 6–2.

The stadium also hosted a total of 18 matches in the 2019 FIFA U-17 World Cup, including the opening match, both semifinals, the third-place match, and the final.

| Preceded by Salt Lake Stadium; Kolkata | FIFA U-17 World Cup; Final venue 2019 | Succeeded by Manahan Stadium; Surakarta |
