= Brazilian Football Confederation =

Governing body of association football in Brazil

CONMEBOL
- Short name: CBF
- Founded: 8 June 1914; 112 years ago
- Headquarters: Rio de Janeiro
- FIFA affiliation: 1923
- CONMEBOL affiliation: 1916
- President: Samir Xaud
- Website: cbf.com.br

The Brazilian Football Confederation (Portuguese: Confederação Brasileira de Futebol; Portuguese pronunciation: [kõfedeɾaˈsɐ̃w bɾaziˈlejɾɐ dʒi futʃiˈbɔw], abbreviated as CBF, pronounced Portuguese pronunciation: [se.beˈɛfi]) is the governing body of football in Brazil.

It was founded on 8 June 1914 as Federação Brasileira de Sports, and renamed Confederação Brasileira de Desportos in 1916. The CBD, in addition to governing football, also governed other sports practiced in Brazil. The football confederation, as known today, separated from other sports associations on 24 September 1979.

The CBF is responsible for organizing national championships including the Campeonato Brasileiro and the Copa do Brasil. It also manages the Brazil national football team, which has won the FIFA World Cup in 1958, 1962, 1970, 1994 and 2002, and the Brazil women's national football team, who were runners-up in the 2007 FIFA Women's World Cup, as well as the youth teams, both men and women.

The CBF has its headquarters in Rio de Janeiro. The confederation owns a training center, named Granja Comary, located in Teresópolis. The confederation reported a budget of $265.6 million (R$1.5 billion) for 2024, and a projection of $398.4 million (R$2.25 billion) for 2025. Its current president is Samir Xaud.

== History ==
=== From 1914 to 1979, as the CBD ===
The logo of the CBD, used until 1979.

The origins of the current CBF date back to 8 June 1914, when the Rio de Janeiro Metropolitan Athletic Sports League (LMEA) and the São Paulo Athletic Sports Association (APEA) founded the Brazilian Sports Federation (FBS), an entity created with the goal of governing not only football but also all Brazilian sports. On 3 March 1915, the São Paulo Foot-Ball League (LPF), a rival of the APEA, founded the Brazilian Football Federation (FBF), aiming to challenge the FBS and become the governing body of Brazilian football.

In 1916, Argentina decided to host the first South American Football Championship, now the Copa América, but a problem arose regarding which entity would represent Brazil in the competition. To remedy this situation, on 19 June 1916, the then Minister of Foreign Affairs, Lauro Müller, took the initiative to meet with the presidents of the FBS, FBF, and LMEA at his residence. After several hours of debate, the creation of the Brazilian Sports Confederation (CBD) was proposed. This culminated in the signing, on 21 June 1916, of an agreement between the entities to merge the FBS and FBF and to create the CBD.

On 24 September 1979, the CBD became the Brazilian Football Confederation (CBF), due to a FIFA decree requiring all national football entities to be solely dedicated to football. This was not the case with the CBD, which, at the time, was responsible for promoting all Olympic sports, including football.

=== As CBF (1979-present) ===
==== From 1979 to 1989 ====
Giulite Coutinho assumed the presidency of the Brazilian Football Confederation during a period of transition in national football. During his tenure, the Brazilian national team competed in two World Cups. In the 1982 tournament held in Spain, the team managed by Telê Santana was eliminated in the second round by Italy, and in the 1986 edition played in Mexico, again under Telê Santana, Brazil was eliminated in the quarterfinals by France on penalties.

In the same year, Octavio Pinto Guimarães succeeded Coutinho at the helm of the CBF. Due to the confederation's financial troubles, the confederation couldn't organize the 1987 edition of the Campeonato Brasileiro, and the Copa União, organized by the Clube dos 13, was played instead, to great controversy. The 1988 edition, won by Bahia, was played normally.

==== Under Ricardo Teixeira (1989-2012) ====
On 16 January 1989, Ricardo Teixeira, then son-in-law of João Havelange, another Brazilian who was at the time the president of FIFA, assumed the presidency of the CBF. His tenure, which lasted 23 years, was marked by sporting achievements and corruption scandals.

Teixeira introduced the Copa do Brasil, a knockout competition played along the lines of the FA Cup that same year. Meanwhile, the Campeonato Brasileiro continued to be embroiled in confusion, when the regulations kept being changed many times, especially in 1993, when the competition was expanded to 32 teams, and also with the annulment of relegation in 1996, and the relegation system adopted in 1999, which led to lawsuits that ultimately led to the Copa João Havelange in 2000, a tournament with 116 teams that only ended in January 2001. After that, the league became stable, and in 2003, a round-robin format was introduced, a model which continues to this day.

Meanwhile, the Brazilian national team won the 1994 FIFA World Cup in the United States after defeating Italy on penalties, and the 2002 tournament after winning the final against Germany, in addition to winning five Copa América titles during the period: 1989, 1997, 1999, 2004 and 2007.

Off the field, the Brazilian national team's value as a product was further explored commercially, with substantial contracts for the CBF. When Teixeira took office, the CBF had only two sponsors including the jersey supplier. However, several scandals plagued Ricardo Teixeira's tenure, including bringing undeclared items from the US after winning the 1994 World Cup, and a controversial 1996 deal with Nike.

On 30 October 2007, Brazil was chosen by FIFA to host the 2014 FIFA World Cup. And on 12 March 2012, Teixeira stepped down as president of the CBF, alleging health reasons, amid scandals.

==== Since 2012 ====
José Maria Marin succeeded Teixeira, and was president of the CBF during the 2014 FIFA World Cup, where Brazil lost 7-1 to Germany in the semifinals, with this being the worst defeat of the national team in its history. Marin was succeeded on 16 April 2015 by Marco Polo Del Nero, and Marin was arrested on 27 May 2015 in Switzerland along with other football officials. Del Nero left office on 15 December 2017 and was banned from football by FIFA in 2018. From 2017 to 2021, the CBF was presided by Antônio Carlos Nunes Lima (known as Coronel Nunes), then followed by Rogério Caboclo, who was removed after accusations of sexual and moral harassment. Afterwards, Ednaldo Rodrigues took over, an office he held until 15 May 2025, when he was removed after falsifying a signature. Samir Xaud succeeded Rodrigues and is the current president.

== Women's football ==
It was announced on 29 September 2007 that the CBF would launch a women's league and cup competition in October 2007 following pressure from FIFA president Sepp Blatter during the 2007 FIFA Women's World Cup in China. The CBF launched the Women's Copa do Brasil in 2007 and the women's Campeonato Brasileiro in 2013.

== Association staff ==
| Name | Position | Ref. |
|---|---|---|
| (Brazil) Samir Xaud | President | |
| (Brazil) Ednailson Rozenha | Vice-president | |
| (Brazil) Fernando Sarney | 2nd Vice-president | |
| (Brazil) Flavio Zveiter | 3rd Vice-president | |
| (Brazil) Gustavo Henrique | 4th Vice-president | |
| (Brazil) José Vanildo da Silva | 5th Vice-president | |
| (Brazil) Michelle Ramalho | 6th Vice-president | |
| (Brazil) Ricardo Lobo | 7th Vice-president | |
| (Brazil) Rubens Angelotti | 8th Vice-president | |
| (Brazil) Alcino Reis Rocha | General Secretary | |
| (Brazil) Valdecir de Souza | Treasurer | |
| (Brazil) Ricardo Leão | Technical Director | |
| (Italy) Carlo Ancelotti | Team coach (men's) | |
| (Brazil) Arthur Elias | Team coach (women's) | |
| (Brazil) Alicio Pena Junior | Referee Chairperson | |
| (Brazil) Rodrigo Martins | Referees Department Director | |
| (Brazil) Marcel Van Gasse | Referee Coordinator | |
| (Brazil) Lavoisier Freire | Futsal Coordinator | |
