= Hong Sung-wook =

Korean association football player

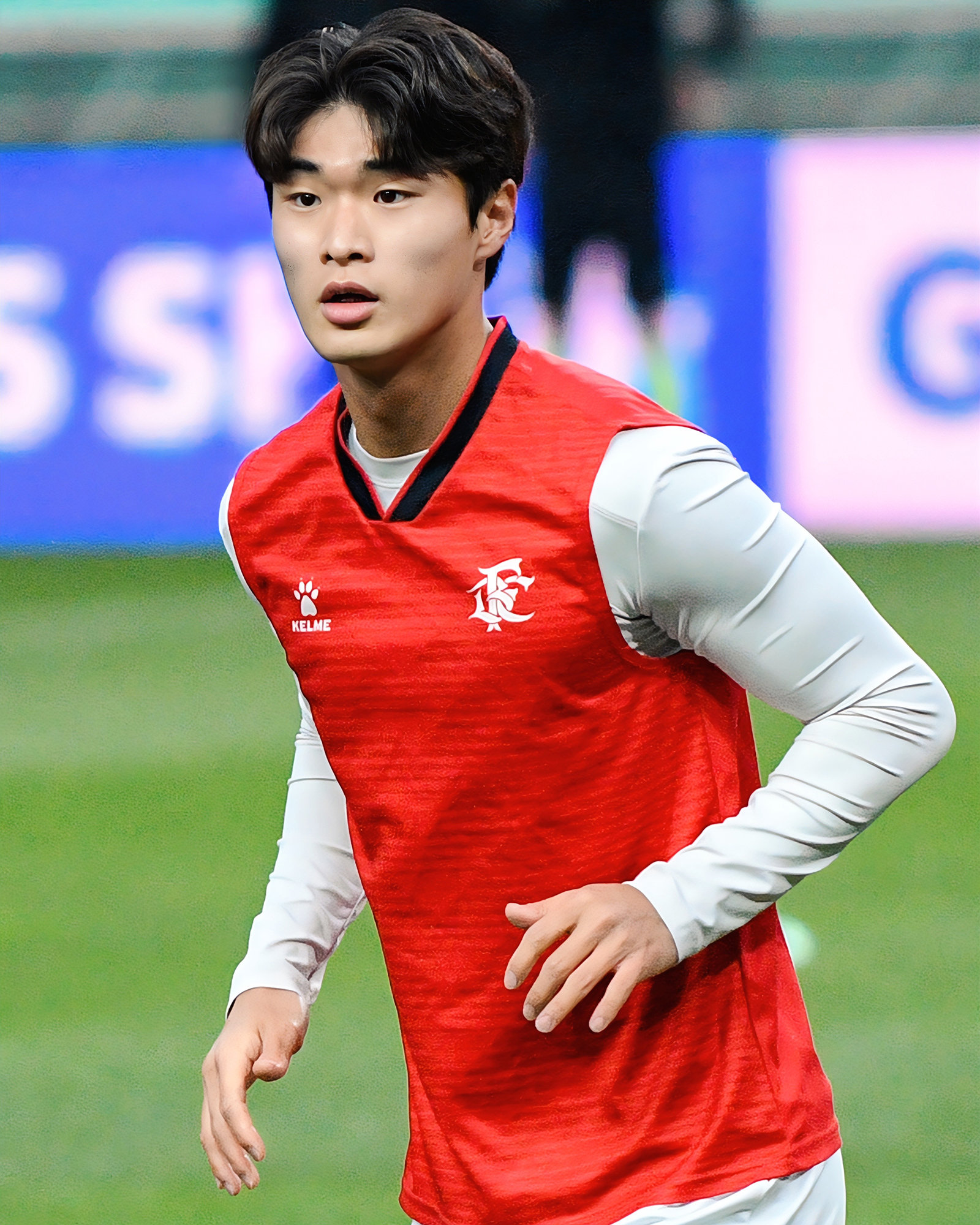
- Hong in 2026

Personal information
- Date of birth: 17 September 2002 (age 24)
- Place of birth: South Korea
- Height: 1.86 m (6 ft 1 in)
- Position: Centre back

Team information
- Current team: Bucheon FC 1995
- Number: 20

Youth career
- 2012–2014: Haedong Elementary School
- 2015–2017: Saha Middle School
- 2018–2020: Busan BuGyeong High School

Senior career*
Years	Team	Apps	(Gls)
2021–2022	Jeju United	8	(0)
2022	→ Muangthong United (loan)	3	(0)
2023–	Bucheon FC 1995	68	(2)

International career^{‡}
2018	South Korea U16	5	(0)
2019	South Korea U17	7	(2)
2019	South Korea U18	1	(0)
Korean name
Hangul	홍성욱
RR	Hong Seonguk
MR	Hong Sŏnguk
- * Club domestic league appearances and goals as of 4 August 2026 ‡ National team caps and goals as of 14:18, 3 June 2021 (UTC)

Hong Sung-wook (Korean: 홍성욱; born 17 September 2002) is a South Korean footballer currently playing as a centre back for K League 1 club Bucheon FC 1995.

== Career statistics ==
=== Club ===
As of 3 June 2021.

Club	Season	League			Cup		Continental		Other		Total	
Club	Season	Division	Apps	Goals	Apps	Goals	Apps	Goals	Apps	Goals	Apps	Goals
Jeju United	2021	K League 1	3	0	0	0	0	0	0	0	3	0
Career total			3	0	0	0	0	0	0	0	3	0
