= Ednaldo Rodrigues =

Brazilian sports executive (born 1954)

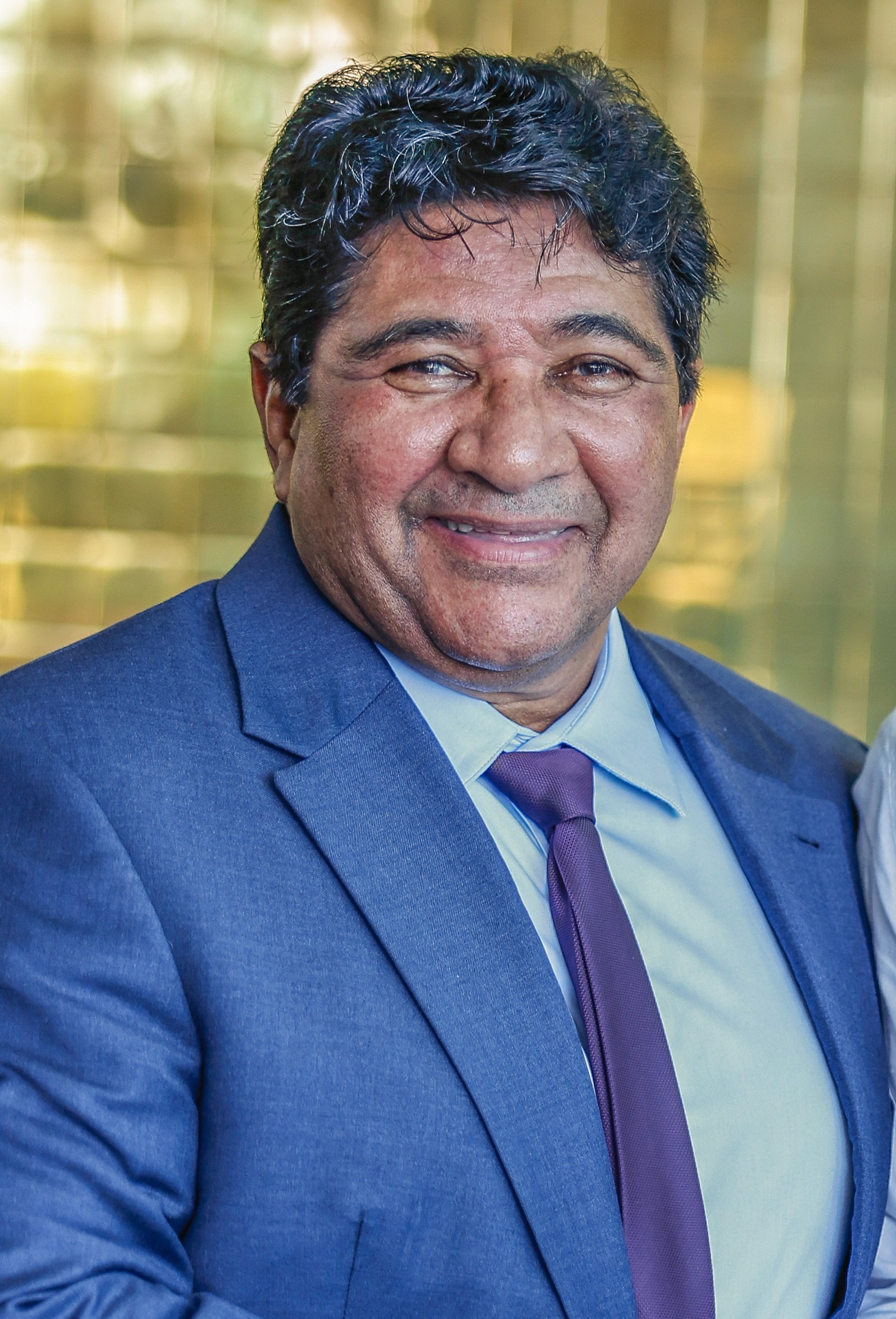
- Rodrigues in 2023

24th President of Brazilian Football Confederation
- In office 23 March 2022 – 15 May 2025
- Preceded by: Coronel Nunes
- Succeeded by: Fernando Sarney (as interim); Samir Xaud (as president-elect)

President of Federação Bahiana de Futebol
- In office 2001–2018

Personal details
- Born: 27 January 1954 (age 72) Vitória da Conquista, Bahia, Brazil

Ednaldo Rodrigues Gomes (born 27 January 1954) is a Brazilian accountant, politician and sports executive, who has served as the 24th president of the Brazilian Football Confederation (CBF) from 2022 until 2025.

== Biography ==
Rodrigues was an amateur soccer player in the 1970s and 1980s. He obtained a degree in Accounting from Faculdade Visconde de Cairu in Salvador in 1991, while earning similar credentials in Financial Auditing at the same college, and administrative management by Fundação Getúlio Vargas. He was president of the Liga Conquistense de Desportes Terrestres. He was also director of the Interior Department of the Federação Bahiana de Futebol (FBF), from 1992 to 2000, he was elected president of the FBF and re-elected twice more, from 2001 to 2018, and vice president of the CBF from 2018 to 2021.

He was interim president of the Confederação Brasileira de Futebol between 2021 and 2022. On 23 March 2022, he was elected president of the CBF. In December 2023, the Court of Justice of Rio de Janeiro invalidated an agreement with the Public Prosecutor's Office that made his election possible. The decision was suspended by an injunction from Minister Gilmar Mendes, of the Supreme Federal Court, in January 2024.

On 24 March 2025, he was re-elected with 100% of the votes. Ednaldo was again removed from his position as president of the CBF on 15 May 2025 after a court in Rio de Janeiro found "possible forgery" in his employment contract upon discovering that one of its signatories was mentally unfit to do so.

During his term, he recognized a request from Clube Atlético Mineiro, making the 1937 Brazilian Football Championship, won by the team from Belo Horizonte, official as the first edition of the Brazilian Championship.

== Controversies ==
=== Piauí's allegations ===
In April 2025, the magazine Piauí made a series of allegations about Ednaldo's management of the CBF. Critics compared his management style to a closed regime, citing the dismissal of employees who opposed his decisions, such as the departure of coach Tite after the 2022 World Cup, and the imposition of changes without consultation, including the hiring of foreigners for key positions. In addition, reports of moral harassment and a climate of intimidation within the entity raise concerns about respect for democratic principles.

Another controversial point is the CBF's close relationship with the Brazilian government, especially during Lula's presidency, including the political appointment of the then Minister of Sports, André Fufuca, and allegations that former player Romário had been pressured to join the Liberal Party in exchange for support for his candidacy for the Senate.

=== Accusation of censorship ===
On April 7, 2025, on ESPN's Linha de Passe program, journalists Dimas Coppede, Gian Oddi, Paulo Calçade, Pedro Ivo Almeida, Victor Birner and William Tavares criticized Ednaldo's management at the CBF, after commenting on the series of complaints published by piauí. After this episode, the journalists were removed by ESPN, which was criticized for allegedly being submissive to Ednaldo. The case was also judged by the media as an act of censorship, due to the lack of freedom of expression. In addition to the Linha de Passe program, Ednaldo was also criticized by Galvão Bueno, on his program on Band. The iconic narrator even made a request to the Public Prosecutor's Office: "The Public Prosecutor's Office has an obligation to open an investigation into this. Public Prosecutor's Office, please, in the name of Brazilian football!"
