= Jayden Braaf =

Dutch footballer (born 2002)

Personal information
- Full name: Jayden Jezairo Braaf
- Date of birth: 31 August 2002 (age 24)
- Place of birth: Amsterdam, Netherlands
- Height: 1.80 m (5 ft 11 in)
- Position: Forward

Team information
- Current team: Lierse
- Number: 73

Youth career
- 2009–2010: ASV Fortius
- 2010–2013: Ajax
- 2013–2014: AFC
- 2014–2018: PSV
- 2018–2022: Manchester City

Senior career*
Years	Team	Apps	(Gls)
2021–2022	Manchester City	0	(0)
2021	→ Udinese (loan)	4	(1)
2022–2023	Borussia Dortmund II	7	(0)
2023	→ Hellas Verona (loan)	6	(0)
2023–2025	Hellas Verona	0	(0)
2024	→ Fortuna Sittard (loan)	6	(0)
2024–2025	→ Salernitana (loan)	16	(2)
2026–	Lierse	2	(0)

International career
2017	Netherlands U15	6	(1)
2018–2019	Netherlands U17	12	(4)
2019	Netherlands U18	3	(2)
Medal record
Representing Netherlands
UEFA European Under-17 Championship
Winner	Ireland 2019	U-17 Team
- * Club domestic league appearances and goals as of 11 September 2026

Jayden Jezairo Braaf (born 31 August 2002) is a Dutch professional footballer who plays as a forward for Challenger Pro League club Lierse in Belgium.

== Club career ==
A youth product of Ajax, PSV Eindhoven and Manchester City, on 1 February 2021, Braaf joined Italian side Udinese on loan until the end of the season. He made his debut with the club in a 1–0 Serie A win over Fiorentina on 28 February 2021, and scored his first goal in Serie A in a 4–2 win over Benevento on 25 April 2021.

On 27 May 2022, Braaf joined Borussia Dortmund on a free transfer.

On 16 January 2023, he joined Serie A side Hellas Verona on loan until the end of the season, with an option to buy.

On 2 July 2023, he joined Hellas Verona for an amount of €1M, with his contract lasting until 2026. In January 2024, he joined Eredivisie club Fortuna Sittard on loan until the end of the season.

On 11 August 2024, Braaf joined Salernitana on loan from Verona.

On 1 September 2025, Braaf's contract with Hellas Verona was terminated by mutual consent.

On 28 August 2026, Braaf joined Belgian Challenger Pro League side Lierse, signing a one-year contract.

== International career ==
Born in the Netherlands, Braaf is of Surinamese descent. He has played internationally for Netherlands at under-15, under-17 and under-18 levels.

== Honours ==
=== Club ===
Netherlands U17

- UEFA European Under-17 Championship: 2019

=== Individual ===
- Man City EDS Players Player of the Year: 2019-20
