= Andrea Capone (footballer, born 2002) =

Italian footballer (born 2002)

Personal information
- Date of birth: 18 March 2002 (age 24)
- Place of birth: Vigevano, Italy
- Height: 1.80 m (5 ft 11 in)
- Position: Attacking midfielder

Team information
- Current team: Club Milano

Youth career
- –2023: AC Milan

Senior career*
Years	Team	Apps	(Gls)
2023–2024	NK Varaždin	1	(0)
2024	Pescara	6	(0)
2024–	Club Milano	3	(1)
- * Club domestic league appearances and goals as of 17 November 2024

Andrea Capone (born 18 March 2002) is an Italian professional footballer who plays as an attacking midfielder for Serie D club Club Milano.

== Early life ==
Capone was born to parents who spent time in Abbiategrasso, Italy.

== Career ==
Before signing for Croatian side NK Varaždin, Capone suffered an injury which sidelined him for a year and a half.

On 1 February 2024, Capone signed with Serie C club Pescara.

== Style of play ==
Capone mainly operates as a midfielder and has been described as a "pure attacking midfielder, a footballer who loves to play close to the striker (or strikers), also to take advantage of his skills in insertion".

== Personal life ==
Capone is the brother of Italian footballer Christian Capone.
