= Estádio Olímpico Pedro Ludovico =

Football stadium in Goiânia, Brazil

Coordinates: 16°40′15″S 49°15′45″W

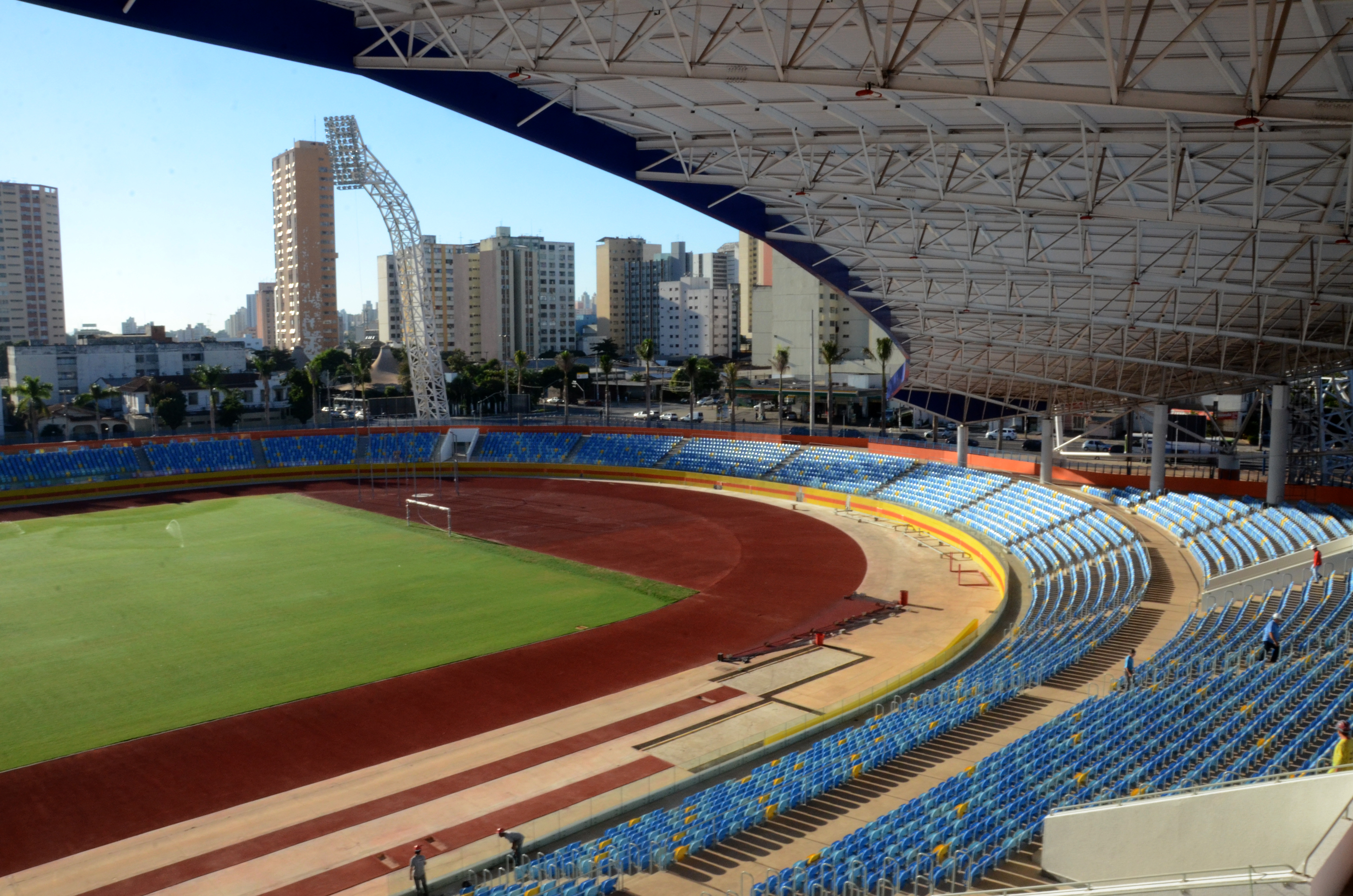
- Interactive map of Estádio Olímpico Pedro Ludovico
- Full name: Estádio Olímpico Pedro Ludovico Teixeira
- Location: Goiânia, Goiás, Brazil
- Capacity: 13,500
- Surface: Grass

Construction
- Opened: 1941

Tenant
- Goiânia

Estádio Olímpico Pedro Ludovico is a stadium in Goiânia, Brazil. It has a capacity of 13,500 spectators. It is the home of Goiânia. It was one of the stadiums that hosted matches during the 2019 FIFA U-17 World Cup and the 2021 Copa América.

The site dates from the 1940s when it was not in the city. It now is and the building was replaced in 2016.
