= Rogério Caboclo =

President of the Brazilian Football Confederation

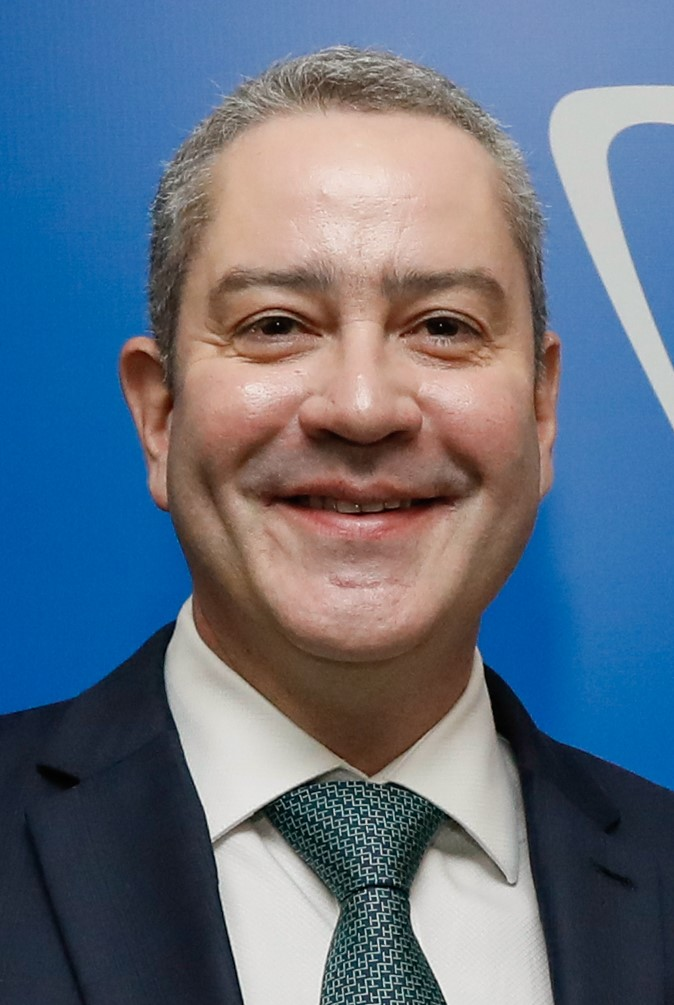
- Caboclo in 2020

President of the Confederação Brasileira de Futebol
- In office 9 April 2019 – 6 June 2021
- Preceded by: Antônio Carlos Nunes de Lima
- Succeeded by: Coronel Nunes

Personal details
- Born: Rogério Langanke Caboclo; 1973 (age 52–53) São Paulo, Brazil

Rogério Langanke Caboclo (born 1973 in São Paulo) is a Brazilian football executive who was the president of the Brazilian Football Confederation from 2019 to July 2021.

== Career ==
Rogério Caboclo was elected on 17 April 2018 as the only candidate with 135 votes of 141 possible, to command the highest authority of the Brazilian football for four years, between April 2019 and April 2023. On 6 June 2021, he was dismissed for 30 days, due to reported sexual harassment.
