= Fernando Sarney =

Brazilian football administrator

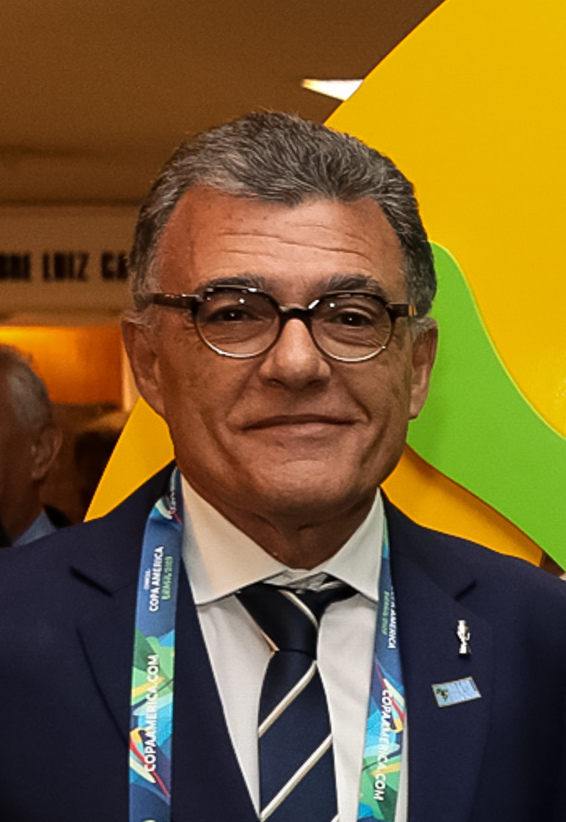
- Sarney in 2019
- Born: Fernando José Macieira Ferreira Araújo da Costa Sarney; 7 January 1956 (age 70); São Luís, Maranhão, Brazil
- Occupations: Member, FIFA Council
- Spouse: Teresa Sarney
- Children: 3
- Parent(s): José Sarney; Marly Sarney

Fernando José Macieira Ferreira Araújo da Costa Sarney (born 7 January 1956) is a Brazilian football administrator and a member of the FIFA Council.

== Personal life and career ==
He is a son of the former President of Brazil José Sarney.

In 2009, Sarney won a court injunction, preventing the newspaper O Estado de São Paulo from publishing "his indictment on corruption charges". The newspaper published an article linking Sarney to a political scandal, Senate Secret Acts.

Sarney has been a FIFA Council member since 2015.
