= 2026 South American U-17 Championship squads =

International football tournament

The 2026 South American U-17 Championship was an international football tournament held in Paraguay from 3 to 19 April 2026. The ten CONMEBOL national teams involved in the tournament were required to register a squad of a minimum of 19 and a maximum of 23 players, including at least three goalkeepers. Players born between 1 January 2009 and 31 December 2011 (ages 15 to 17) were eligible to compete in the tournament (Regulations Articles 47 and 50).

The age listed for each player is as of 3 April 2026, the first day of the tournament. A flag is included for coaches who are of a different nationality than their own national team.

== Group A ==
=== Chile ===
The squad was announced on 27 March 2026.

Head coach: Ariel Leporati

No.	Pos.	Player	Date of birth (age)	Club
1	GK	Vicente Villegas	23 August 2009 (aged 16)	(Football Federation of Chile) Coquimbo Unido
12	GK	Cristóbal del Río	9 February 2010 (aged 16)	(Football Federation of Chile) Universidad Católica
23	GK	Amaro Contreras	5 January 2011 (aged 15)	(Football Federation of Chile) Colo-Colo
2	DF	Dylan Erazo	5 July 2009 (aged 16)	(Football Federation of Chile) Universidad de Chile
3	DF	Esteban Páez	2 April 2009 (aged 17)	(Football Federation of Chile) Universidad de Concepción
4	DF	Baltazar Oróstica	30 September 2010 (aged 15)	(Football Federation of Chile) O'Higgins
5	DF	Lucas López	3 April 2009 (aged 17)	(Football Federation of Chile) Curicó Unido
13	DF	Tomás González	28 January 2010 (aged 16)	(Football Federation of Chile) Audax Italiano
16	DF	Martín Barrios	14 September 2009 (aged 16)	(Football Federation of Chile) Universidad Católica
17	DF	Antonio Cannoni	2 October 2009 (aged 16)	(Football Federation of Chile) Universidad Católica
21	DF	León Palma	6 June 2010 (aged 15)	(Football Federation of Chile) Universidad Católica
6	MF	Sebastián Melgarejo	1 April 2009 (aged 17)	(Football Federation of Chile) Huachipato
8	MF	Joaquín Muñoz	7 June 2009 (aged 16)	(Football Federation of Chile) O'Higgins
14	MF	Nicolás Marinetti	11 August 2009 (aged 16)	(Football Federation of Chile) Universidad de Chile
15	MF	Renato Vera	28 November 2009 (aged 16)	(Football Federation of Chile) Everton
20	MF	Ignacio Cerda	19 August 2009 (aged 16)	(Football Federation of Chile) O'Higgins
7	FW	Jonathan Guerrero	9 April 2009 (aged 16)	(Argentine Football Association) Independiente
9	FW	Amaro Pérez	2 September 2009 (aged 16)	(Football Federation of Chile) Universidad Católica
10	FW	Bayron Barrera	5 January 2009 (aged 17)	(Football Federation of Chile) Deportes Iquique
11	FW	Bayron Lizama	23 February 2009 (aged 17)	(Football Federation of Chile) Universidad Católica
18	FW	Amaro Riveros	21 December 2010 (aged 15)	(Football Federation of Chile) Universidad Católica
19	FW	Fabián Donoso	26 January 2009 (aged 17)	(Football Federation of Chile) Universidad de Chile
22	FW	Diego Avendaño	27 May 2009 (aged 16)	(Football Federation of Chile) Curicó Unido

=== Colombia ===
The squad was announced on 30 March 2026.

Head coach: Freddy Hurtado

No.	Pos.	Player	Date of birth (age)	Club
1	GK	Luigi Ortiz	10 February 2009 (aged 17)	(Colombian Football Federation) Deportivo Cali
12	GK	Camilo Blandón	17 April 2009 (aged 16)	(Colombian Football Federation) Estudiantil
22	GK	Freyder Celis	5 February 2009 (aged 17)	(Colombian Football Federation) Millonarios
2	DF	Álex Gómez	27 April 2009 (aged 16)	(United States Soccer Federation) New York Red Bulls
3	DF	Santiago Vallecilla	17 March 2009 (aged 17)	(Colombian Football Federation) Deportivo Cali
4	DF	Jerson Balanta	27 January 2009 (aged 17)	(Colombian Football Federation) Orsomarso
8	DF	Luis Maturana	20 July 2009 (aged 16)	(Colombian Football Federation) Independiente Medellín
9	DF	Adrián Mosquera	9 April 2009 (aged 16)	(Colombian Football Federation) Independiente Medellín
18	DF	Edwin Estrella	20 May 2009 (aged 16)	(Colombian Football Federation) Belén La Nubia
23	DF	Juan Fori	30 January 2009 (aged 17)	(Colombian Football Federation) Estudiantil
5	MF	Simón Rojas	14 April 2009 (aged 16)	(Colombian Football Federation) Atlético Nacional
6	MF	Eíder Carrillo	12 January 2009 (aged 17)	(Colombian Football Federation) Independiente Medellín
13	MF	Anderson Murillo	15 April 2009 (aged 16)	(Colombian Football Federation) Independiente Medellín
14	MF	Gilberto Saavedra	2 February 2009 (aged 17)	(Colombian Football Federation) Real Cundinamarca
15	MF	Julio Sinisterra	11 January 2009 (aged 17)	(Colombian Football Federation) Fortaleza
16	MF	Miguel Agámez	15 May 2009 (aged 16)	(Colombian Football Federation) Barranquilla
17	MF	Jhon Maturana	26 November 2009 (aged 16)	(Colombian Football Federation) Internacional de Palmira
20	MF	Jean Rojas	12 July 2009 (aged 16)	(Colombian Football Federation) Alianza Valledupar
21	MF	Carlos Rodríiguez	10 February 2009 (aged 17)	(Colombian Football Federation) Junior
7	FW	Matías Caicedo	25 December 2009 (aged 16)	(Colombian Football Federation) Independiente Yumbo
10	FW	Samuel Martínez	5 April 2009 (aged 16)	(Colombian Football Federation) Atlético Nacional
11	FW	Dilan Bonilla	27 August 2009 (aged 16)	(Colombian Football Federation) Academia Alemana Popayán
19	FW	José Escorcia	4 July 2009 (aged 16)	(Colombian Football Federation) Atlético Nacional

=== Ecuador ===
The squad was announced on 2 April 2026.

Head coach: (Argentina) Gonzalo Ferrea

No.	Pos.	Player	Date of birth (age)	Club
1	GK	Jefferson Camacho	10 January 2010 (aged 16)	(Ecuadorian Football Federation) Independiente del Valle
2	DF	Deinner Ordóñez	29 October 2009 (aged 16)	(Ecuadorian Football Federation) Independiente del Valle
3	MF	Jefferson Medina	4 February 2010 (aged 16)	(Ecuadorian Football Federation) LDU Quito
4	MF	Nicolás Sotomayor	15 June 2009 (aged 16)	(Ecuadorian Football Federation) Aucas
5	MF	Adrián Cuadrado	10 March 2009 (aged 17)	(Royal Spanish Football Federation) Barcelona
6	DF	Jhon Chica	16 October 2009 (aged 16)	(Ecuadorian Football Federation) Emelec
7	MF	Edwin Quintero	15 August 2009 (aged 16)	(Ecuadorian Football Federation) Independiente del Valle
8	MF	Brayson Zamora	15 November 2009 (aged 16)	(Ecuadorian Football Federation) Independiente del Valle
9	FW	Jhon Guerrero	14 March 2009 (aged 17)	(Ecuadorian Football Federation) Deportivo Santo Domingo
10	MF	Jandry Calle	17 June 2009 (aged 16)	(Ecuadorian Football Federation) LDU Quito
11	MF	Holger Quintero	15 August 2009 (aged 16)	(Ecuadorian Football Federation) Independiente del Valle
12	GK	Mijaíl Vaca	16 November 2009 (aged 16)	(Ecuadorian Football Federation) El Nacional
13	MF	Sergio González	16 November 2009 (aged 16)	(Ecuadorian Football Federation) Emelec
14	FW	Janer Mina	9 January 2009 (aged 17)	(Ecuadorian Football Federation) LDU Quito
15	MF	Nixon Ayoví	18 July 2009 (aged 16)	(Ecuadorian Football Federation) Independiente del Valle
16	MF	Mathews Soto	28 June 2010 (aged 15)	(Ecuadorian Football Federation) Orense
17	MF	Adonys Quiñónez	9 August 2009 (aged 16)	(Ecuadorian Football Federation) Aucas
18	MF	Jefri Mina	14 March 2009 (aged 17)	(Ecuadorian Football Federation) Guayas
19	FW	Derick Pabón	19 September 2009 (aged 16)	(Ecuadorian Football Federation) Universidad Católica
20	FW	Luis Fragozo	8 April 2010 (aged 15)	(Ecuadorian Football Federation) Emelec
21	MF	Iker Mantilla	6 February 2009 (aged 17)	(Royal Spanish Football Federation) Mallorca
22	GK	Crixson Rodríguez	17 April 2009 (aged 16)	(Ecuadorian Football Federation) Universidad Católica
23	FW	Johan Martínez	10 May 2009 (aged 16)	(Ecuadorian Football Federation) Independiente del Valle

=== Paraguay ===
The squad was announced on 2 April 2026.

Head coach: (Argentina) Mariano Uglessich

No.	Pos.	Player	Date of birth (age)	Club
1	GK	Matías Fernández	10 June 2009 (aged 16)	(Paraguayan Football Association) Olimpia
12	GK	Lucas Silvero	26 February 2010 (aged 16)	(Paraguayan Football Association) Libertad
23	GK	Armando González	19 August 2009 (aged 16)	(Paraguayan Football Association) Libertad
2	DF	Mateo Giménez	25 October 2009 (aged 16)	(Paraguayan Football Association) Libertad
3	DF	Kevin Amarilla	22 September 2009 (aged 16)	(Paraguayan Football Association) Olimpia
4	DF	Lautaro Vera	9 February 2009 (aged 17)	(Argentine Football Association) River Plate
5	DF	Elías Díaz	20 January 2009 (aged 17)	(Paraguayan Football Association) Libertad
6	DF	Leo Cristaldo	12 January 2009 (aged 17)	(Argentine Football Association) Vélez Sarsfield
13	DF	Yago Portillo	3 January 2009 (aged 17)	(Paraguayan Football Association) Olimpia
17	DF	César Recalde	5 January 2009 (aged 17)	(Paraguayan Football Association) Libertad
7	MF	Mathías Cabrera	24 July 2009 (aged 16)	(Paraguayan Football Association) Olimpia
8	MF	Eduardo Salinas	12 January 2009 (aged 17)	(Paraguayan Football Association) Olimpia
10	MF	Lucas Romañach	5 January 2009 (aged 17)	(Paraguayan Football Association) Guaraní
14	MF	Alam Fernández	10 September 2009 (aged 16)	(Paraguayan Football Association) Olimpia
15	MF	Manuel Cáceres	13 February 2009 (aged 17)	(Paraguayan Football Association) Guaraní
16	MF	Óscar Ramírez	22 March 2009 (aged 17)	(Paraguayan Football Association) Cerro Porteño
9	FW	Giovanni López	8 August 2009 (aged 16)	(Paraguayan Football Association) Cerro Porteño
11	FW	Tobías Jara	6 May 2009 (aged 16)	(Paraguayan Football Association) Sportivo San Lorenzo
18	FW	Jonathan Rolón	18 March 2009 (aged 17)	(Paraguayan Football Association) Olimpia
19	FW	Éver López	14 June 2009 (aged 16)	(Paraguayan Football Association) Libertad
20	FW	Mizael Alcaraz	18 February 2009 (aged 17)	(Paraguayan Football Association) Cerro Porteño
21	FW	Axel Gómez	13 August 2009 (aged 16)	(Paraguayan Football Association) Cerro Porteño
22	FW	Axel Rodríguez	26 January 2009 (aged 17)	(Paraguayan Football Association) Guaraní

=== Uruguay ===
The squad was announced on 17 March 2026.

Head coach: Ignacio González

No.	Pos.	Player	Date of birth (age)	Club
1	GK	Luis Machín	6 February 2010 (aged 16)	(Uruguayan Football Association) Nacional
12	GK	Augusto Sánchez	8 February 2009 (aged 17)	(Uruguayan Football Association) Nacional
23	GK	Mateo Díaz	12 July 2009 (aged 16)	(Uruguayan Football Association) Peñarol
2	DF	Gabriel Da Silva	13 January 2009 (aged 17)	(Uruguayan Football Association) Peñarol
3	DF	Lautaro Muñiz	26 March 2009 (aged 17)	(Uruguayan Football Association) Nacional
13	DF	Dylan Mora	22 May 2010 (aged 15)	(Uruguayan Football Association) Nacional
17	DF	Ezequiel Fernández	31 October 2010 (aged 15)	(Uruguayan Football Association) Peñarol
4	MF	Anderson Luz	19 September 2009 (aged 16)	(Uruguayan Football Association) Montevideo City Torque
5	MF	Pablo Barreiro	7 January 2009 (aged 17)	(Uruguayan Football Association) Liverpool
6	MF	Felipe De León	20 April 2009 (aged 16)	(Uruguayan Football Association) Nacional
8	MF	Ramiro García	6 June 2009 (aged 16)	(Uruguayan Football Association) Nacional
10	MF	Thiago Brizuela	26 February 2009 (aged 17)	(Uruguayan Football Association) Liverpool
11	MF	Facundo Saldaña	4 April 2009 (aged 16)	(Uruguayan Football Association) Boston River
14	MF	Dahel Guedes	8 September 2009 (aged 16)	(Uruguayan Football Association) Peñarol
15	MF	Bruno Bueno	3 January 2009 (aged 17)	(Uruguayan Football Association) Nacional
16	MF	Dante Rodella	5 March 2010 (aged 16)	(Uruguayan Football Association) Nacional
18	MF	Facundo Rodríguez	12 January 2010 (aged 16)	(Uruguayan Football Association) Montevideo City Torque
7	FW	Nicolás Scotti	26 November 2009 (aged 16)	(Uruguayan Football Association) Defensor Sporting
9	FW	Juan Gancheff	20 April 2009 (aged 16)	(Uruguayan Football Association) Boston River
19	FW	Thiago Mora	4 November 2009 (aged 16)	(Uruguayan Football Association) Boston River
20	FW	Vicente Pesce	18 May 2011 (aged 14)	(Uruguayan Football Association) Paysandú
21	FW	Lautaro Blengio	14 August 2009 (aged 16)	(Uruguayan Football Association) Montevideo Wanderers
22	FW	Alan Soares de Lima	16 January 2010 (aged 16)	(Uruguayan Football Association) Defensor Sporting

== Group B ==
=== Argentina ===
The squad was announced on 30 March 2026.

Head coach: Diego Placente

No.	Pos.	Player	Date of birth (age)	Club
1	GK	Valentín Reigia	30 September 2009 (aged 16)	(Argentine Football Association) Argentinos Juniors
12	GK	Thiago Parga	24 March 2009 (aged 17)	(Argentine Football Association) Huracán
23	GK	Facundo Ortellado	1 June 2009 (aged 16)	(Argentine Football Association) Banfield
2	DF	Álvaro Güich	23 March 2009 (aged 17)	(Argentine Football Association) Rosario Central
3	DF	Simón Escobar	17 July 2009 (aged 16)	(Argentine Football Association) Vélez Sarsfield
4	DF	Thiago Pérez	25 March 2009 (aged 17)	(Argentine Football Association) Huracán
6	DF	Julio Coria	15 May 2009 (aged 16)	(Argentine Football Association) Boca Juniors
13	DF	Mateo Mendizabal	14 September 2009 (aged 16)	(Argentine Football Association) Banfield
14	DF	Benjamín Salinas	29 May 2009 (aged 16)	(Argentine Football Association) Boca Juniors
16	DF	Felipe Echenique	10 March 2009 (aged 17)	(Argentine Football Association) Lanús
17	DF	Alex Cardozo	16 January 2009 (aged 17)	(Argentine Football Association) Lanús
5	MF	Matheo Machuca	26 January 2009 (aged 17)	(Argentine Football Association) Independiente
8	MF	Marcos Ortiz	5 March 2009 (aged 17)	(Argentine Football Association) Belgrano
10	MF	Giovanni Baroni	21 January 2009 (aged 17)	(Argentine Football Association) Talleres
15	MF	Santino Mambrín	25 May 2009 (aged 16)	(Argentine Football Association) Lanús
18	MF	Galo Escobar	8 December 2009 (aged 16)	(Argentine Football Association) River Plate
20	MF	Thiago Domínguez	1 March 2009 (aged 17)	(Argentine Football Association) Lanús
7	FW	Tobias Goytia	14 April 2009 (aged 16)	(Argentine Football Association) River Plate
9	FW	Alan Alcaraz	11 July 2009 (aged 16)	(Argentine Football Association) Argentinos Juniors
11	FW	Juan Policella	3 August 2009 (aged 16)	(Argentine Football Association) Vélez Sarsfield
19	FW	Facundo Salinas	29 January 2009 (aged 17)	(Argentine Football Association) Vélez Sarsfield
21	FW	Emiliano Barrionuevo	2 January 2009 (aged 17)	(Argentine Football Association) Boca Juniors
22	FW	Benjamín Tapia	4 February 2009 (aged 17)	(Argentine Football Association) Belgrano

=== Bolivia ===
The squad was announced on 3 April 2026.

Head coach: Bernardo Aguirre

No.	Pos.	Player	Date of birth (age)	Club
1	GK	Carlos Borda	11 March 2009 (aged 17)	(Argentine Football Association) Atlético Tucumán
12	GK	Ronald Taborga	31 January 2009 (aged 17)	(Bolivian Football Federation) Always Ready
23	GK	Luis Zambrano	15 June 2009 (aged 16)	(Bolivian Football Federation) San Antonio Bulo Bulo
2	DF	Jefer Ortega	13 September 2009 (aged 16)	(Bolivian Football Federation) Tahuichi
3	DF	Matias Cuellar	22 May 2009 (aged 16)	(Bolivian Football Federation) Always Ready
4	DF	Lysander Lucas	13 January 2009 (aged 17)	(Brazilian Football Confederation) São Paulo
5	DF	Roberto Barbery	23 May 2009 (aged 16)	(Bolivian Football Federation) Bolívar
13	DF	Erick Justiniano	26 January 2009 (aged 17)	(Bolivian Football Federation) Planeta
14	DF	Pablo Lanz	13 September 2009 (aged 16)	(Argentine Football Association) Atlético Tucumán
22	DF	Ian Rodriguez	22 January 2009 (aged 17)	(Bolivian Football Federation) Wilstermann
6	MF	Bruno Nuñez	24 January 2009 (aged 17)	(Bolivian Football Federation) Bolívar
8	MF	Quimey Vasco	23 January 2009 (aged 17)	(Argentine Football Association) Gimnasia de la Plata
15	MF	Santiago Somoya	30 March 2009 (aged 17)	(Bolivian Football Federation) Always Ready
16	MF	Matias Medrano	25 February 2009 (aged 17)	No club
19	MF	Said Mabrook	10 July 2009 (aged 16)	(Bolivian Football Federation) Bolívar
20	MF	Roberto Perez	21 May 2010 (aged 15)	(Bolivian Football Federation) Always Ready
21	MF	Juan Carniellio	21 April 2009 (aged 16)	(Argentine Football Association) Ferro Carril Oeste
7	FW	Jhassir Guerra	25 February 2009 (aged 17)	(Argentine Football Association) Sportivo Pocitos
9	FW	Nabil Nacif	19 September 2009 (aged 16)	(Bolivian Football Federation) Oriente Petrolero
10	FW	Carlos Collazo	17 February 2009 (aged 17)	(Bolivian Football Federation) Always Ready
11	FW	Leonel Rocha	9 July 2009 (aged 16)	(Argentine Football Association) Banfield
17	FW	Alejandro Ortiz	9 January 2009 (aged 17)	(Mexican Football Federation) Diablos Tesistán
18	FW	Benjamin Chavez	4 February 2010 (aged 16)	(Argentine Football Association) Vélez Sarsfield

=== Brazil ===
The squad was announced on 11 March 2026.

Head coach: Dudu Patetuci

No.	Pos.	Player	Date of birth (age)	Club
1	GK	Vitor Wachter	20 January 2009 (aged 17)	(Brazilian Football Confederation) Grêmio
12	GK	Gustavo Milani	2 March 2009 (aged 17)	(Brazilian Football Confederation) Corinthians
22	GK	Arthur Vale	28 January 2009 (aged 17)	(Brazilian Football Confederation) Santos
2	DF	Samuel Almeida	16 January 2009 (aged 17)	(Brazilian Football Confederation) Atlético Mineiro
3	DF	David Brendo	15 January 2009 (aged 17)	(Brazilian Football Confederation) Grêmio
4	DF	Breno Sales	6 November 2009 (aged 16)	(Brazilian Football Confederation) Vasco
6	DF	Arthur Monteiro	10 September 2009 (aged 16)	(Brazilian Football Confederation) Athletico Paranaense
13	DF	Guilherme Lira	6 January 2009 (aged 17)	(Brazilian Football Confederation) Palmeiras
14	DF	João Sá	9 January 2009 (aged 17)	(Brazilian Football Confederation) Santos
16	DF	Richard Wendel	25 March 2009 (aged 17)	(Brazilian Football Confederation) Fluminense
23	DF	Danylo do Amaral	31 January 2009 (aged 17)	(Brazilian Football Confederation) Fluminense
5	MF	Vinicius Rocha	3 March 2009 (aged 17)	(Brazilian Football Confederation) Santos
8	MF	Eduardo Pape	20 March 2009 (aged 17)	(Brazilian Football Confederation) Cruzeiro
10	MF	Eduardo Conceição	7 December 2009 (aged 16)	(Brazilian Football Confederation) Palmeiras
15	MF	Leonardo Cerci	5 May 2009 (aged 16)	(Brazilian Football Confederation) Athletico Paranaense
18	MF	Ruan Yago	16 January 2009 (aged 17)	(Brazilian Football Confederation) Palmeiras
20	MF	Robert William	30 December 2009 (aged 16)	(Brazilian Football Confederation) São Paulo
7	FW	Kauê Furquim	27 February 2009 (aged 17)	(Brazilian Football Confederation) Bahia
9	FW	João Bezerra	29 June 2009 (aged 16)	(Brazilian Football Confederation) Internacional
11	FW	Riquelme Henrique	17 January 2009 (aged 17)	(Brazilian Football Confederation) Atlético Mineiro
17	FW	Bryan Lima	18 November 2009 (aged 16)	(Brazilian Football Confederation) Athletico Paranaense
19	FW	David Nogueira	21 January 2009 (aged 17)	(Brazilian Football Confederation) Santos
21	FW	Lyan Araújo	17 February 2009 (aged 17)	(Brazilian Football Confederation) Bahia

=== Peru ===
The squad was announced on 3 April 2026.

Head coach: Renzo Revoredo

No.	Pos.	Player	Date of birth (age)	Club
1	GK	Matteo Tassara	2 January 2009 (aged 17)	(Italian Football Federation) Virtus Entella
12	GK	Fernando Lasanta	14 September 2009 (aged 16)	(Argentine Football Association) Vélez Sarsfield
21	GK	Daniel Recavarren	11 August 2009 (aged 16)	(Peruvian Football Federation) Alianza Lima
2	DF	Cristóbal Gutiérrez	5 June 2009 (aged 16)	(Peruvian Football Federation) Universitario
3	DF	Carlos Altez	24 May 2009 (aged 16)	(Peruvian Football Federation) Sporting Cristal
4	DF	Adriano Ortega	11 February 2009 (aged 17)	(Peruvian Football Federation) Sporting Cristal
6	DF	Fabio Vásquez	18 February 2009 (aged 17)	(Peruvian Football Federation) Sporting Cristal
7	DF	Sebastián Ortega	12 February 2009 (aged 17)	(Peruvian Football Federation) Alianza Lima
13	DF	Robert La Madrid	30 July 2009 (aged 16)	(Peruvian Football Federation) Universitario
15	DF	Alessandro Marsano	22 July 2009 (aged 16)	(Peruvian Football Federation) Sporting Cristal
16	DF	Ángel Villalta	1 July 2009 (aged 16)	(Peruvian Football Federation) Sporting Cristal
18	DF	Jhairo Reyna	19 August 2009 (aged 16)	(Peruvian Football Federation) Universidad César Vallejo
22	DF	Dayron Castillo	9 May 2010 (aged 15)	(Peruvian Football Federation) Universitario
5	MF	Sean Gormley	13 March 2009 (aged 17)	(United States Soccer Federation) Inter Miami
8	MF	Robinho Ormeño	28 April 2009 (aged 16)	(Peruvian Football Federation) Universitario
14	MF	Franco Giambavicchio	3 February 2009 (aged 17)	(Italian Football Federation) Juventus
23	MF	Rodrigo Vega	18 November 2009 (aged 16)	(Peruvian Football Federation) Universidad César Vallejo
9	FW	Sandro Cometivos	18 May 2009 (aged 16)	(Peruvian Football Federation) Universitario
10	FW	Eystin Córdova	1 July 2009 (aged 16)	(Peruvian Football Federation) Universitario
11	FW	Gonzalo Álvarez	26 June 2009 (aged 16)	(Peruvian Football Federation) Universitario
17	FW	José Aranda	22 October 2009 (aged 16)	(Peruvian Football Federation) Alianza Lima
19	FW	Carlos Alvarado	7 January 2009 (aged 17)	(Peruvian Football Federation) Alianza Lima
20	FW	Geray Motta	21 February 2009 (aged 17)	(Peruvian Football Federation) Alianza Lima

=== Venezuela ===
The squad was announced on 3 April 2026.

Head coach: Jhonny Ferreira

No.	Pos.	Player	Date of birth (age)	Club
1	GK	Sebastián Angulo	22 January 2009 (aged 17)	(Venezuelan Football Federation) Academia Puerto Cabello
12	GK	Daniel Cabrera	16 March 2009 (aged 17)	(Venezuelan Football Federation) Carabobo
23	GK	Víctor Rodríguez	11 April 2009 (aged 16)	(Venezuelan Football Federation) Deportivo Rayo Zuliano
2	DF	Kendys Jiménez	7 February 2009 (aged 17)	(Venezuelan Football Federation) Universidad Central
3	DF	Diego Sánchez	30 November 2009 (aged 16)	(Venezuelan Football Federation) Deportivo La Guaira
4	DF	Enmanuel Brito	25 February 2009 (aged 17)	(Venezuelan Football Federation) Monagas
6	DF	Ángel López	17 February 2010 (aged 16)	(Venezuelan Football Federation) Caracas
13	DF	Ángel Mota	28 April 2009 (aged 16)	(Venezuelan Football Federation) Monagas
14	DF	Andrew Rasquín	20 February 2009 (aged 17)	(Venezuelan Football Federation) Metropolitanos
15	DF	Alessandro Boada	21 January 2009 (aged 17)	(Venezuelan Football Federation) Metropolitanos
18	DF	Diego López	11 June 2009 (aged 16)	(Royal Spanish Football Federation) Celta Vigo
5	MF	Piero García	19 March 2009 (aged 17)	(Venezuelan Football Federation) Caracas
7	MF	Gregory Molina	1 June 2009 (aged 16)	(Venezuelan Football Federation) Carabobo
8	MF	Román Lozada	31 January 2009 (aged 17)	(Argentine Football Association) Vélez Sarsfield
10	MF	Junior Araujo	11 June 2009 (aged 16)	(Venezuelan Football Federation) Universidad Central
11	MF	José Gamboa	28 May 2010 (aged 15)	(Venezuelan Football Federation) Deportivo Miranda
16	MF	Marco Riera	10 March 2010 (aged 16)	(Venezuelan Football Federation) Monagas
17	MF	Andy Saavedra	9 January 2009 (aged 17)	(Venezuelan Football Federation) Caracas
19	MF	Jesús Barrios	17 August 2009 (aged 16)	(Venezuelan Football Federation) Deportivo Rayo Zuliano
20	MF	Kevin Guzmán	28 July 2009 (aged 16)	(Venezuelan Football Federation) Universidad Central
9	FW	Luis Flores	2 February 2009 (aged 17)	(Venezuelan Football Federation) Metropolitanos
21	FW	Sebastían Azuaje	24 May 2009 (aged 16)	(Venezuelan Football Federation) Caracas
22	FW	Santiago Sánchez	22 April 2009 (aged 16)	(Venezuelan Football Federation) Carabobo
