= Samuel Martínez =

Colombian footballer (born 2009)

Personal information
- Full name: Samuel Martínez Valencia
- Date of birth: 5 April 2009 (age 17)
- Place of birth: Tuluá, Colombia
- Height: 1.84 m (6 ft 1/2 in)
- Position: Attacking midfielder

Team information
- Current team: Atlético Nacional

Youth career
- Talentos GV
- Atlético Nacional

International career^{‡}
Years	Team	Apps	(Gls)
2026–	Colombia U17	6	(0)
Medal record
Representing Colombia
South American U-17 Championship
Winner	2026 Paraguay
- ‡ National team caps and goals as of 20 April 2026

Samuel Martínez Valencia (born 5 April 2009) is a Colombian footballer who plays as an attacking midfielder in the academy of Atlético Nacional. He has agreed to join Premier League club Liverpool on 1 July 2027.

A native of Tuluá and the son of a former professional footballer, Martínez began playing at the Talentos GV school in his hometown before settling in Atlético Nacional's youth system in Medellín. In July 2026, Liverpool announced that it had agreed a deal to sign him, with the move to take effect for the 2027–28 season once he turns 18.

Martínez is a Colombia youth international. He wore the number 10 shirt for the under-17 side that won the 2026 South American U-17 Championship in Paraguay, Colombia's first title in the competition since 1993, and which qualified for the 2026 FIFA U-17 World Cup.

== Early life ==
Martínez comes from Tuluá, in the department of Valle del Cauca. His father, Jairo Martínez, known as "El Indio", was a professional footballer who played for clubs including Independiente Santa Fe and Cortuluá. Martínez has said that his love of the game came from his father but that he chose the sport himself, and that he has never felt pressured to succeed in it. He has named Lionel Messi and Luis Díaz as his idols.

== Youth career ==
Martínez took his first steps in organized football at Club Deportivo Talentos GV in Tuluá, a school founded by former Colombia youth international Gustavo Victoria. He then spent a period playing in Miami before returning to Colombia. At 12, he presented himself at Atlético Nacional and played for the club in the Babyfútbol and the national under-13 tournament, before going back to Talentos GV; he rejoined Nacional permanently at 14. Along with José Escorcia and Simón Rojas, he was one of three players recruited through the scouting network led by Camilo Pérez whom Nacional's academy supplied to Colombia's under-17 squad in 2026.

In Medellín, Martínez lived in one of the club's residences for academy players and trained with Nacional's under-20 side under coach Sebastián Zapata. Although he was registered as a Nacional player, he had not signed a professional contract with the club; Victoria, his mentor, explained in April 2026 that an agreement existed between Nacional and Talentos GV but that Martínez himself was not under contract. As of July 2026, he had yet to make his professional debut.

== Club career ==
Martínez's performances at the 2026 South American U-17 Championship drew reported interest from several European clubs, including Liverpool, Manchester City, Bayern Munich and Borussia Dortmund. In May 2026, Colombian media reported that Liverpool had reached an agreement with Nacional worth around one million euros, with Nacional retaining a percentage of any future sale.

On 21 July 2026, Liverpool announced that it had agreed a deal to sign Martínez from Nacional, and that he would join the club's academy ahead of the 2027–28 season. Because he was still a minor, Martínez was to remain with Nacional until he turned 18 in April 2027; the contract was reported to run for five years. According to Agence France-Presse, he became the third Colombian player signed by Liverpool, after Alessandro Frigerio in 1933 and Luis Díaz in 2022.

== International career ==
Martínez was considered for Colombia's squad at the 2025 South American U-17 Championship, held in Cartagena and Montería, but was not selected. He was named for the 2026 South American U-17 Championship in Paraguay, where he wore the number 10 shirt under head coach Freddy Hurtado. Martínez played in all six of Colombia's matches and provided three assists, including one in the 3–0 semi-final win over Brazil and another in the 4–0 victory over Argentina in the final in Luque on 19 April. The title was Colombia's second in the competition and its first since 1993, and the team's run to the final secured qualification for the 2026 FIFA U-17 World Cup in Qatar.

Martínez remained part of the under-17 squad during its preparations for the World Cup. He was called up for a training camp in Bogotá in July 2026, followed by two friendlies against Chile, and in September he was named for the UEFA Friendship Cup, an under-18 invitational tournament in Nyon, Switzerland. He started in midfield in Colombia's opening match of the tournament, a 3–2 defeat to England on 24 September.

== Style of play ==
Martínez is an attacking midfielder who can also play as a central playmaker or as an advanced interior midfielder, and is comfortable in both a 4–3–3 and a 4–2–3–1. He combines refined technique with a box-to-box work rate, and is known for his vision and ability to break lines with through balls, his dribbling and acceleration, and his long-range shooting. His coaches have also highlighted his discipline and tactical intelligence. Martínez has described himself as a player who likes to change the tempo of play going forward and take on opponents, while also keeping possession and contributing defensively.

His slim build, upright running style and deceptive speed over short distances led to comparisons with the Brazilian playmaker Kaká, and he has been nicknamed the "Colombian Kaká" in the press. The Athletic placed him in Colombia's tradition of number 10s, a role previously associated with Carlos Valderrama, James Rodríguez and Juan Fernando Quintero.

== Honours ==
Colombia U17

- South American U-17 Championship: 2026
