= Colombia national under-17 football team =

Colombian national under-17 association football team

Colombia
- Nickname(s): Los Cafeteros (The Coffee Growers); La Tricolor (The Tricolour)
- Association: Federación Colombiana de Fútbol (FCF)
- Confederation: CONMEBOL (South America)
- Head coach: Freddy Hurtado
- FIFA code: COL
First colours	Second colours

First international
- Colombia 0–2 Peru (Buenos Aires, Argentina; 1 April 1985)

Biggest win
- Colombia 9–1 Finland (Helsinki, Finland; 19 August 2003); Colombia 8–0 Bolivia (Asunción, Paraguay; 5 May 1991)

Biggest defeat
- Colombia 0–4 Switzerland (Lagos, Nigeria; 12 November 2009); Brazil 5–1 Colombia (Ibarra, Ecuador; 25 March 2011); Paraguay 4–0 Colombia (Luque, Paraguay; 17 March 2015); Colombia 0–4 Germany (New Delhi, India; 16 October 2017)

FIFA U-17 World Cup
- Appearances: 8 (first in 1989)
- Best result: Fourth place (2003, 2009)

South American U-17 Championship
- Appearances: 22 (first in 1985)
- Best result: Winners (1993, 2026)
Medal record
Bolivarian Games
Gold medal – first place	1997 Arequipa	Team
Gold medal – first place	2005 Colombia	Team
Gold medal – first place	2013 Trujillo	Team
Gold medal – first place	2017 Santa Marta	Team
Silver medal – second place	1993 Bolivia	Team
Silver medal – second place	2001 Ambato	Team
Bronze medal – third place	2022 Valledupar	Team
South American Games
Gold medal – first place	1994 Valencia	Team
Gold medal – first place	2010 Medellín	Team
Gold medal – first place	2014 Santiago	Team

The Colombia national under-17 football team represents Colombia in international under-17 association football competitions and is administered by the Colombian Football Federation (FCF).

The team competes in the South American U-17 Championship, which serves as South America's qualifying competition for the FIFA U-17 World Cup. Colombia has won the South American championship twice, in 1993 and 2026. Its best performances at the FIFA U-17 World Cup came in 2003 and 2009, when it finished fourth.

== History ==
=== Early years ===
Colombia first competed in the South American under-17 championship in 1985, when the competition was known as the South American Under-16 Championship. The tournament later became the principal South American qualifying competition for the FIFA U-17 World Cup. Colombia finished sixth in its first appearance and did not qualify for the 1985 or 1987 FIFA world championships.

Colombia reached the continental podium for the first time at the 1988 South American Under-16 Football Championship, finishing third. The result qualified the team for the 1989 FIFA U-16 World Championship in Scotland, where Colombia made its debut at a world championship in the age category. It finished third in its group and did not advance to the knockout stage.

=== First continental title ===
Colombia won its first South American under-17 title at the 1993 South American Under-17 Football Championship, which it hosted. The team finished unbeaten and secured first place in the final standings. The title qualified Colombia for the 1993 FIFA U-17 World Championship in Australia.

At the 1993 world championship, Colombia defeated Cameroon but lost to Russia and Australia in the group stage. It therefore did not advance to the knockout phase.

Colombia did not qualify for the 1995, 1997, 1999 or 2001 FIFA under-17 world championships. It returned to the continental podium at the 2003 South American Under-17 Football Championship, finishing third and qualifying for the FIFA tournament in Finland.

=== World Cup breakthroughs ===
Colombia's first major success at the FIFA U-17 World Cup came at the 2003 FIFA U-17 World Championship in Finland. The team advanced from its group after recording three victories, including a 9–1 win over the hosts. It defeated Costa Rica in the quarter-finals before losing to Brazil in the semi-finals. Colombia finished fourth after losing the third-place match to Argentina.

The fourth-place finish was Colombia's best result at the FIFA U-17 World Cup at the time. Several members of the 2003 squad later established professional careers in Colombia and abroad, contributing to the team's reputation as an important pathway into the senior national team.

Colombia did not qualify for the 2005 FIFA U-17 World Championship, but returned to the tournament at the 2007 FIFA U-17 World Cup in South Korea. It reached the round of 16 before being eliminated.

Colombia reached the semi-finals again at the 2009 FIFA U-17 World Cup in Nigeria. After advancing from the group stage, it defeated Turkey and Argentina before losing to Spain in the semi-final. Colombia finished fourth after losing the third-place match to Switzerland.

The result equalled Colombia's fourth-place finish from 2003 and remains one of the team's two best performances at the FIFA U-17 World Cup.

=== 2011–2019 ===
Colombia did not qualify for the 2011 FIFA U-17 World Cup, 2013 FIFA U-17 World Cup or 2015 FIFA U-17 World Cup. Its strongest result during this period came at the 2013 South American U-17 Championship, where it finished third in the final group.

The team returned to the FIFA U-17 World Cup at the 2017 FIFA U-17 World Cup in India. Colombia advanced from the group stage and defeated Germany in the round of 16 before losing to Spain in the quarter-finals.

Colombia failed to qualify for the 2019 FIFA U-17 World Cup after finishing in the first round of the 2019 South American U-17 Championship. It was also eliminated in the first round of the 2023 South American U-17 Championship and consequently did not qualify for the 2023 FIFA U-17 World Cup.

=== 2025–present ===
Colombia qualified for the 2025 FIFA U-17 World Cup in Qatar after finishing second at the 2025 South American U-17 Championship. In the World Cup group stage, Colombia drew with Germany and El Salvador before defeating North Korea 2–0. The result placed Colombia second in Group G and sent it to the round of 32, where it lost 2–0 to France.

Colombia won the 2026 South American U-17 Championship in Paraguay. It defeated Argentina 4–0 in the final at the Cancha CONMEBOL in Luque to claim its second title in the competition, following its first championship in 1993. Miguel Agámez scored twice in the final, while Matías Caicedo and José Escorcia also scored.

The 2026 championship was Colombia's first South American under-17 title won outside the country. Escorcia finished as the tournament's leading scorer and was one of the principal figures in Colombia's successful campaign.

== Competitive record ==
*Draws include knockout matches decided by a penalty shoot-out. **Gold background indicates that the tournament was won. ***Red border indicates that the tournament was held in Colombia.

Champions Runners-up Third place Fourth place

=== FIFA U-17 World Cup ===
Year	Round	Position	Pld	W	D*	L	GF	GA
(China) 1985	Did not Qualify							
(Canada) 1987	Did not Qualify							
(Scotland) 1989	Group stage	15th	3	0	1	2	3	5
(Italy) 1991	Did not Qualify							
(Japan) 1993	Group stage	14th	3	1	0	2	3	6
(Ecuador) 1995	Did not Qualify							
(Egypt) 1997	Did not Qualify							
(New Zealand) 1999	Did not Qualify							
(Trinidad and Tobago) 2001	Did not Qualify							
(Finland) 2003	Fourth Place	4th	6	3	2	1	14	5
(Peru) 2005	Did not Qualify							
(South Korea) 2007	Round of 16	13th	4	1	1	2	10	7
(Nigeria) 2009	Fourth Place	4th	7	2	3	2	8	11
(Mexico) 2011	Did not Qualify							
(United Arab Emirates) 2013	Did not Qualify							
(Chile) 2015	Did not Qualify							
(India) 2017	Round of 16	11th	4	2	0	2	5	7
(Brazil) 2019	Did not Qualify							
(Indonesia) 2023	Did not Qualify							
(Qatar) 2025	Round of 32	26th	4	1	2	1	3	3
(Qatar) 2026	In progress	TBD	1	1	0	0	2	1
Total:8/21	Fourth place	4th	32	11	9	12	48	45

=== South American U-17 Championship ===
The South American U-17 Championship is CONMEBOL's principal competition for men's under-17 national teams and serves as the region's qualifying competition for the FIFA U-17 World Cup.

Year	Round	Position	Pld	W	D	L	GF	GA
(Argentina) 1985	Round-robin	6th	8	3	1	4	9	12
(Peru) 1986	First round	8th	4	1	1	2	3	5
(Ecuador) 1988	Third place	3rd	7	2	3	2	7	6
(Paraguay) 1991	First round	5th	4	2	1	1	10	4
(Colombia) 1993	Champions	1st	7	5	2	0	14	4
(Peru) 1995	First round	5th	4	1	1	2	6	6
(Paraguay) 1997	First round	5th	4	2	1	1	5	2
(Uruguay) 1999	First round	8th	4	1	1	2	6	8
(Peru) 2001	First round	5th	4	2	1	1	7	7
(Bolivia) 2003	Third place	3rd	7	3	3	1	11	10
(Venezuela) 2005	Fourth place	4th	7	2	1	4	6	8
(Ecuador) 2007	Runners-up	2nd	9	5	3	1	16	5
(Chile) 2009	Fourth place	4th	7	4	2	1	11	6
(Ecuador) 2011	Fifth place	5th	9	3	2	4	12	15
(Argentina) 2013	First round	8th	4	0	3	1	3	4
(Paraguay) 2015	Sixth place	6th	9	2	3	4	11	15
(Chile) 2017	Fourth place	4th	9	4	2	3	12	12
(Peru) 2019	First round	9th	4	0	0	4	4	8
(Ecuador) 2023	First round	9th	4	0	1	3	1	9
(Colombia) 2025	Runners-up	2nd	6	4	1	1	11	4
(Paraguay) 2026	Champions	1st	6	4	1	1	10	2

== Other competitions ==
=== Bolivarian Games ===
Year	Result
1993	Runners-up
1997	Champions
2001	Runners-up
2005	Champions
2013	Champions
2017	Champions
2022	Third place

=== South American Games ===
Year	Host city	Result
1994	Valencia	Champions
2010	Medellín	Champions
2014	Santiago	Champions

== Head-to-head record ==
=== FIFA U-17 World Cup record ===
The following table shows Colombia's head-to-head record in the FIFA U-17 World Cup.

Opponent	Pld	W	D	L	GF	GA	GD	Win %
Argentina	2	1	1	0	4	3	+1	50.00
Brazil	1	0	0	1	0	2	−2	0.00
China	1	1	0	0	2	1	+1	100.00
Costa Rica	1	1	0	0	2	0	+2	100.00
Czech Republic	1	0	0	1	1	3	−2	0.00
Finland	1	1	0	0	9	1	+8	100.00
Gambia	1	0	1	0	2	2	+0	0.00
Germany	2	0	1	1	3	7	−4	0.00
Ghana	2	0	0	2	1	3	−2	0.00
Guinea	1	0	1	0	1	1	+0	0.00
India	1	1	0	0	2	1	+1	100.00
Iran	1	0	1	0	0	0	+0	0.00
Mexico	1	0	1	0	0	0	+0	0.00
Netherlands	1	1	0	0	2	1	+1	100.00
Nigeria	1	0	0	1	1	2	−1	0.00
Portugal	1	0	0	1	2	3	−1	0.00
Qatar	1	0	0	1	0	2	−2	0.00
Saudi Arabia	1	0	0	1	0	1	−1	0.00
Spain	1	0	0	1	0	1	−1	0.00
Switzerland	1	0	0	1	0	4	−4	0.00
Trinidad and Tobago	1	1	0	0	5	0	+5	100.00
Turkey	1	0	1	0	1	1	+0	0.00
United States	2	2	0	0	5	2	+3	100.00
Total	27	9	7	11	43	41	+2	33.33

=== Current squad ===
The following players were called up to the squad for the 2026 South American U-17 Championship, which was held in Paraguay from 3 April to 19 April 2026.

No.	Pos.	Player	Date of birth (age)	Club
1	GK	Luigi Ortiz	10 February 2009 (aged 17)	(Colombian Football Federation) Deportivo Cali
12	GK	Camilo Blandón	17 April 2009 (aged 16)	(Colombian Football Federation) Estudiantil
22	GK	Freyder Celis	5 February 2009 (aged 17)	(Colombian Football Federation) Millonarios
2	DF	Álex Gómez	27 April 2009 (aged 16)	(United States Soccer Federation) New York Red Bulls
3	DF	Santiago Vallecilla	17 March 2009 (aged 17)	(Colombian Football Federation) Deportivo Cali
4	DF	Jerson Balanta	27 January 2009 (aged 17)	(Colombian Football Federation) Orsomarso
8	DF	Luis Maturana	20 July 2009 (aged 16)	(Colombian Football Federation) Independiente Medellín
9	DF	Adrián Mosquera	9 April 2009 (aged 16)	(Colombian Football Federation) Independiente Medellín
18	DF	Edwin Estrella	20 May 2009 (aged 16)	(Colombian Football Federation) Belén La Nubia
23	DF	Juan Fori	30 January 2009 (aged 17)	(Colombian Football Federation) Estudiantil
5	MF	Simón Rojas	14 April 2009 (aged 16)	(Colombian Football Federation) Atlético Nacional
6	MF	Eíder Carrillo	12 January 2009 (aged 17)	(Colombian Football Federation) Independiente Medellín
13	MF	Anderson Murillo	15 April 2009 (aged 16)	(Colombian Football Federation) Independiente Medellín
14	MF	Gilberto Saavedra	2 February 2009 (aged 17)	(Colombian Football Federation) Real Cundinamarca
15	MF	Julio Sinisterra	11 January 2009 (aged 17)	(Colombian Football Federation) Fortaleza
16	MF	Miguel Agámez	15 May 2009 (aged 16)	(Colombian Football Federation) Barranquilla
17	MF	Jhon Maturana	26 November 2009 (aged 16)	(Colombian Football Federation) Internacional de Palmira
20	MF	Jean Rojas	12 July 2009 (aged 16)	(Colombian Football Federation) Alianza Valledupar
21	MF	Carlos Rodríguez	10 February 2009 (aged 17)	(Colombian Football Federation) Junior
7	FW	Matías Caicedo	25 December 2009 (aged 16)	(Colombian Football Federation) Independiente Yumbo
10	FW	Samuel Martínez	5 April 2009 (aged 16)	(Colombian Football Federation) Atlético Nacional
11	FW	Dilan Bonilla	27 August 2009 (aged 16)	(Colombian Football Federation) Academia Alemana Popayán
19	FW	José Escorcia	4 July 2009 (aged 16)	(Colombian Football Federation) Atlético Nacional

== Honours ==
- FIFA U-17 World Cup
  - Fourth place (2): 2003, 2009
- South American U-17 Championship
  - Winners (2): 1993, 2026
  - Runners-up (2): 2007, 2025
  - Third place (2): 1988, 2003
  - Fourth place (2): 2005, 2009
- Bolivarian Games
  - Champions (4): 1997, 2005, 2013, 2017
  - Runners-up (2): 1993, 2001
  - Third place (1): 2022
- South American Games
  - Champions (3): 1994, 2010, 2014

== See also ==
- Colombia national football team
- Colombia national under-20 football team
- Colombia national under-15 football team
- Colombia Olympic football team
- Colombia national futsal team
