= Uruguay national under-17 football team =

Uruguay Under 17
- Nickname(s): Charrúas; Gorriones Celestes (Sky Blue Sparrows); La Celeste (The Sky Blue)
- Association: Asociación Uruguaya de Fútbol (Uruguayan Football Association)
- Confederation: CONMEBOL (South America)
- Head coach: Ignacio González
- FIFA code: URU
First colours	Second colours

FIFA U-17 World Cup
- Appearances: 6 (first in 1991)
- Best result: Runners-up (2011)

South American U-17 Championship
- Appearances: 20 (first in 1985)
- Best result: Runners-up (1991, 2005, and 2011)

The Uruguay national under-17 football team is the representative of Uruguay within all FIFA sponsored tournaments that pertain to that age level. Uruguay has participated in six of 17 FIFA U-17 World Cup events.

== Results and fixtures ==
The following is a list of match results in the last 12 months, as well as any future matches that have been scheduled.

Win Draw Loss

=== 2026 ===
9 February Torneo Jóvenes Promesas Group stage	Uruguay	2–1	Bolivia	Córdoba
		Report		Stadium: CARD Amadeo Nuccetelli

10 February Torneo Jóvenes Promesas Group stage	Uruguay	3–2	Peru	Córdoba
		Report		Stadium: CARD Amadeo Nuccetelli

11 February Torneo Jóvenes Promesas Group stage	(Brazil) Athletico Paranaense U17	2–1	Uruguay	Córdoba
		Report		Stadium: Estadio La Boutique

13 February Torneo Jóvenes Promesas Group stage	Uruguay	2–1	Paraguay	Córdoba
		Report		Stadium: CARD Amadeo Nuccetelli

14 February Torneo Jóvenes Promesas Third-place match	Argentina	1–0	Uruguay	Córdoba
		Report		Stadium: Estadio La Boutique

23 February Friendly	Uruguay	0–1	Venezuela	Barros Blancos
		Report		Stadium: Complejo Celeste

24 February Friendly	Uruguay	1–0	Venezuela	Barros Blancos
		Report		Stadium: Complejo Celeste

3 March Friendly	Uruguay	1–2	Argentina	Montevideo
		Report		Stadium: Estadio Saroldi

5 March Friendly	Uruguay	1–2	Argentina	Barros Blancos
		Report		Stadium: Complejo Celeste

7 March Friendly	Uruguay	0–1	Ecuador	Montevideo
		Report		Stadium: JDH María Mincheff

10 March Friendly	Uruguay	1–0	Ecuador	Montevideo
		Report		Stadium: Estadio Luis Franzini

3 April 2026 South American U-17 Championship Group A	Uruguay	1–1	Chile	Ypané
		Report		Stadium: Estadio Ypané

5 April 2026 South American U-17 Championship Group A	Uruguay	1–1	Paraguay	Ypané
		Report		Stadium: Estadio Ypané

7 April 2026 South American U-17 Championship Group A	Ecuador	2–1	Uruguay	Ypané
		Report		Stadium: Estadio Ypané

9 April 2026 South American U-17 Championship Group A	Colombia	0–2	Uruguay	Ypané
		Report		Stadium: Estadio Ypané

16 April 2026 South American U-17 Championship 5th–8th semi-finals	Uruguay	3–0	Venezuela	Villeta
		Report		Stadium: Estadio Ameliano Villeta

18 April 2026 South American U-17 Championship Fifth-place match	Uruguay	2–3	Chile	Villeta
		Report		Stadium: Estadio Ameliano Villeta

25 August Friendly	Uruguay	3–0	Uzbekistan	Alicante
		Report		Stadium: Albir Garden Sports

27 August Friendly	Uruguay	4–0	Saudi Arabia	Alicante
		Report		Stadium: Albir Garden Sports

29 August Friendly	Spain U18	3–0	Uruguay	Alicante
		Report		Stadium: Albir Garden Sports

1 October Friendly	Uruguay	2–1	Sweden	Valencia
		Report		Stadium: Oliva Nova Sports Center

3 October Friendly	Uruguay	1–0	Belgium	Valencia
		Report		Stadium: Oliva Nova Sports Center

6 October Friendly	Uruguay	1–0	Poland	Valencia
		Report		Stadium: Oliva Nova Sports Center

29 October Friendly	Chile	2–2	Uruguay	Santiago
		Report

31 October Friendly	Chile	1–1	Uruguay	Santiago
		Report

19 November 2026 FIFA U-17 World Cup Group D	Saudi Arabia	2–3	Uruguay	Al Rayyan
	Faris Bu Shaqraa 38' (pen.), 58' (pen.)	Report	Pablo Barreiro 44'; Jawad Al-Hashim Al-Sayed 69' (o.g.); Facundo Rodríguez 86'	Stadium: Aspire Zone; Referee: Miloš Milanović (Serbia)

22 November 2026 FIFA U-17 World Cup Group D	Uruguay	4–1	Haiti	Al Rayyan
	Lautaro Muñiz 32'; Pablo Barreiro 39'; Nicolás Rodríguez 76'; Alan Soares de Lima 82'	Report	Marvenly Exilas 21'	Stadium: Aspire Zone; Referee: Asker Nadjafaliev (Uzbekistan)

25 November 2026 FIFA U-17 World Cup Group D	Uruguay	v	France	Al Rayyan
				Stadium: Aspire Zone

== Coaching staff ==
=== Current personnel ===
As of 18 April 2026

Position	Name
Head coach	(Uruguay) Ignacio González

== Players ==
=== Current squad ===
The following 21 players were named in the squad for the 2026 FIFA U-17 World Cup.

No.	Pos.	Player	Date of birth (age)	Club
1	GK	Luis Machín	6 February 2010 (age 16)	(Uruguayan Football Association) Nacional
12	GK	Mateo Díaz	12 July 2009 (age 17)	(Uruguayan Football Association) Peñarol
21	GK	Bautista Gavary	28 December 2009 (age 16)	(Uruguayan Football Association) Paysandú
2	DF	Gabriel Da Silva	13 January 2009 (age 17)	(Uruguayan Football Association) Peñarol
3	DF	Lautaro Muñiz	26 March 2009 (age 17)	(Uruguayan Football Association) Nacional
4	DF	Dahel Guedes	8 September 2009 (age 17)	(Uruguayan Football Association) Peñarol
6	DF	Felipe De León	20 April 2009 (age 17)	(Uruguayan Football Association) Nacional
14	DF	Johel Farías	16 September 2010 (age 16)	(Uruguayan Football Association) Nacional
16	DF	Dante Rodella	5 March 2010 (age 16)	(Uruguayan Football Association) Nacional
5	MF	Pablo Barreiro	7 January 2009 (age 17)	(Uruguayan Football Association) Liverpool Montevideo
8	MF	Ramiro García	6 June 2009 (age 17)	(Uruguayan Football Association) Nacional
10	MF	Thiago Brizuela	26 February 2009 (age 17)	(Uruguayan Football Association) Liverpool Montevideo
13	MF	Johann Fernández	13 February 2011 (age 15)	(Uruguayan Football Association) Boston River
15	MF	Bruno Bueno	3 January 2009 (age 17)	(Uruguayan Football Association) Nacional
18	MF	Facundo Rodríguez	12 January 2010 (age 16)	(Uruguayan Football Association) Montevideo City Torque
20	MF	Nicolás Rodríguez	24 March 2009 (age 17)	(Royal Spanish Football Federation) Atlético Madrid
7	FW	Nicolás Scotti	26 November 2009 (age 16)	(Uruguayan Football Association) Defensor Sporting
9	FW	Juan Gancheff	20 April 2009 (age 17)	(Uruguayan Football Association) Boston River
11	FW	Alan Soares de Lima	16 January 2010 (age 16)	(Uruguayan Football Association) Defensor Sporting
17	FW	Facundo Saldaña	4 April 2009 (age 17)	(Uruguayan Football Association) Boston River
19	FW	Matteo Correia	9 January 2009 (age 17)	(Uruguayan Football Association) Defensor Sporting

== Competitive record ==
=== FIFA U-17 World Cup ===
FIFA U-17 World Cup record
Year	Round	Position	GP	W	D*	L	GS	GA
(China) 1985	Did not qualify							
(Canada) 1987	Did not qualify							
(Scotland) 1989	Did not qualify							
(Italy) 1991	Group Stage	12th	3	1	0	2	1	3
(Japan) 1993	Did not qualify							
(Ecuador) 1995	Did not qualify							
(Egypt) 1997	Did not qualify							
(New Zealand) 1999	Quarter-finals	8th	4	1	1	2	8	5
(Trinidad and Tobago) 2001	Did not qualify							
(Finland) 2003	Did not qualify							
(Peru) 2005	Group Stage	15th	3	0	0	3	3	7
(South Korea) 2007	Did not qualify							
(Nigeria) 2009	Quarter-finals	7th	5	2	2	1	8	7
(Mexico) 2011	Runners-up	2nd	7	5	0	2	11	5
(United Arab Emirates) 2013	Quarter-finals	6th	5	3	1	1	14	6
(Chile) 2015	Did not qualify							
(India) 2017	Did not qualify							
(Brazil) 2019	Did not qualify							
(Peru) ~~2021~~	Cancelled							
(Indonesia) 2023	Did not qualify							
(Qatar) 2025	Did not qualify							
(Qatar) 2026	In progress	TBD	1	1	0	0	3	2
Total:7/21	Runners-up	2nd	28	13	4	11	48	35

=== South American Under-17 Football Championship ===
South American Under-17 Football Championship record
Year	Round	GP	W	D*	L	GS	GA
(Argentina) 1985	Fifth Place	8	3	1	4	11	13
(Peru) 1986	Group Stage	4	2	1	1	4	3
(Ecuador) 1988	Group Stage	4	1	1	2	5	6
(Paraguay) 1991	Runners-up	7	3	3	1	19	4
(Colombia) 1993	Group Stage	4	2	0	2	10	3
(Peru) 1995	Third Place	6	2	2	2	13	8
(Paraguay) 1997	Group Stage	4	2	0	2	4	4
(Uruguay) 1999	Third Place	6	4	1	1	14	6
(Peru) 2001	Group Stage	4	2	0	2	8	7
(Bolivia) 2003	Fourth Place	7	4	0	3	14	10
(Venezuela) 2005	Runners-up	7	5	1	1	15	5
(Ecuador) 2007	Group Stage	4	1	1	2	7	6
(Chile) 2009	Third Place	7	4	2	1	11	6
(Ecuador) 2011	Runners-up	9	4	3	2	12	10
(Argentina) 2013	Fourth Place	9	4	4	1	20	12
(Paraguay) 2015	Fifth Place	9	6	0	3	17	10
(Chile) 2017	Group Stage	4	1	1	2	4	5
(Peru) 2019	Sixth Place	4	3	2	4	18	16
(Ecuador) 2023	Group Stage	4	1	1	2	2	5
(Colombia) 2025	Group Stage	4	0	2	2	3	8
Total	20/20	120	54	26	42	211	147

* Draws include knockout matches decided on penalty kicks.

== Head-to-head record ==
The following table shows Uruguay's head-to-head record in the FIFA U-17 World Cup.

Opponent	Pld	W	D	L	GF	GA	GD	Win %
Algeria	1	1	0	0	2	0	+2	100.00
Australia	1	0	0	1	1	2	−1	0.00
Brazil	1	1	0	0	3	0	+3	100.00
Canada	1	1	0	0	3	0	+3	100.00
Congo	1	1	0	0	2	1	+1	100.00
Cuba	1	1	0	0	1	0	+1	100.00
England	1	0	0	1	0	2	−2	0.00
Ghana	2	0	0	2	2	5	−3	0.00
Iran	1	1	0	0	2	1	+1	100.00
Italy	2	1	1	0	2	1	+1	50.00
Ivory Coast	1	0	1	0	1	1	+0	0.00
Mexico	2	0	0	2	0	4	−4	0.00
New Zealand	2	2	0	0	12	0	+12	100.00
Nigeria	1	0	0	1	0	2	−2	0.00
Poland	1	0	1	0	1	1	+0	0.00
Rwanda	1	1	0	0	1	0	+1	100.00
Slovakia	1	1	0	0	4	2	+2	100.00
South Korea	1	0	0	1	1	3	−2	0.00
Spain	2	0	1	1	3	4	−1	0.00
Turkey	1	0	0	1	2	3	−1	0.00
United States	1	0	0	1	0	1	−1	0.00
Uzbekistan	1	1	0	0	2	0	+2	100.00
Total	27	12	4	11	45	33	+12	44.44

== Honours ==
- FIFA U-17 World Cup

- Runner-up (1): 2011

- South American Under-17 Football Championship

- Runner-up (3): 1991, 2005, 2011.

== Individual awards ==
In addition to team victories, Uruguayans players have won individual awards at FIFA U-17 World Cups.

Year	Award	Player
1999	Bronze Ball	Alvaro Meneses
2009	Bronze Boot	Sebastián Gallegos
2011	Golden Glove	Mathías Cubero

== See also ==
- Uruguay national football team
- Uruguay local national football team
- Uruguay national under-23 football team
- Uruguay national under-20 football team
- Uruguay national under-18 football team
- Uruguay national under-15 football team
- South American Under-17 Football Championship
