= Miguel Agámez =

Colombian footballer (born 2009)

Personal information
- Full name: Miguel Ángel Agámez Cabarcas
- Date of birth: 15 May 2009 (age 17)
- Place of birth: Cartagena, Colombia
- Position: Midfielder

Team information
- Current team: Junior
- Number: 24

Youth career
- –2017: Talentos Cartageneros
- 2017–: Junior

Senior career*
Years	Team	Apps	(Gls)
2024	→ Barranquilla F.C. (loan)	10	(0)
2025	Junior	6	(0)
2026–	→ Barranquilla F.C. (loan)	15	(1)

International career^{‡}
2025–	Colombia U17		
- * Club domestic league appearances and goals as of 5 October 2026 ‡ National team caps and goals as of 3 October 2026

Miguel Ángel Agámez Cabarcas (born 15 May 2009) is a Colombian professional association football player who plays as a midfielder for Junior.

A product of the Cartagena-based Talentos Cartageneros academy, Agámez joined Junior's youth system before beginning his senior career with Barranquilla. He became Barranquilla's youngest debutant in 2024 and later made his Categoría Primera A debut for Junior in 2025. At international level, he represented Colombia at under-15, under-16 and under-17 level and was part of the team that won the 2026 South American U-17 Championship.

== Club career ==
=== Youth career ===
Agámez began playing football with Talentos Cartageneros, a youth club in Cartagena, where he remained until the age of eight. He was subsequently recruited by Junior and entered the club's youth system.

=== Barranquilla ===
Junior sent Agámez on loan to its affiliated club Barranquilla for the 2024 Categoría Primera B season. He made his senior debut on 21 July 2024 in a 1–1 draw against Tigres F.C. in Bogotá. Agámez assisted Barranquilla's goal and, aged 15, became the youngest player to appear for the club.

During the 2024 season, Agámez made ten appearances for Barranquilla in the Categoría Primera B. His performances led to his return to Junior's first-team group for the following season.

=== Junior ===
Agámez returned to Junior for the 2025 season. He made his professional debut for the club on 10 May 2025, entering as a substitute in a 2–1 defeat against Independiente Santa Fe in the Categoría Primera A. He came on in the 86th minute, aged 15.

=== Return to Barranquilla ===
Agámez was listed with Barranquilla during the 2026 season while continuing to be contracted to Junior. He appeared in the Categoría Primera B, including a 2–1 victory over Unión Magdalena.

== International career ==
Agámez represented Colombia at under-15, under-16 and under-17 level. He was first involved with the under-17 team during the 2025 South American U-17 Championship.

=== 2026 South American U-17 Championship ===
Agámez was included in Colombia's squad for the 2026 South American U-17 Championship, held in Paraguay in April 2026. Colombia reached the final against Argentina after defeating Brazil in the semi-final. Agámez finished the tournament with four goals. He scored once against Paraguay during the group stage, once against Brazil in Colombia's 3–0 semi-final victory, and twice against Argentina in the final. In the final, he opened the scoring with a powerful long-range shot in first-half stoppage time before adding Colombia's third goal in the 58th minute with a header following a cross from José Escorcia. Colombia won 4–0, with Agámez's two goals complemented by goals from Matías Caicedo and Escorcia.

Following the final, Agámez was described by ESPN as one of the leading figures of Colombia's championship-winning team. His two goals made him the decisive scorer in the final, while his performances in midfield earned him wider attention during the tournament.

=== UEFA Friendship Cup ===
In September 2026, Agámez was selected for Colombia's squad at the UEFA Friendship Cup, held in Switzerland. The Colombian Football Federation listed him among the players called up by head coach Fredy Hurtado for the tournament, where Colombia's group included England, Egypt and South Korea. In Colombia's opening match, a 3–2 defeat against England on 24 September, Agámez scored Colombia's second goal in the 76th minute.

== Honours ==
Colombia U17

- South American U-17 Championship: 2026

== Career statistics ==
Appearances and goals by club, season and competition
Club	Season	League			Total	
Club	Season	Division	Apps	Goals	Apps	Goals
Barranquilla	2024	Categoría Primera B	10	0	10	0
Junior	2025	Categoría Primera A	2	0	2	0
Career total			12	0	12	0

As of match played 3 October 2026
