= 1985 South American U-16 Championship =

1985 South American U-16 Football Championship
Tournament details
- Host country: Argentina
- Dates: 1–22 April
- Teams: 9 (from 1 confederation)
- Venue: (in 2 host cities)

Final positions
- Champions: Argentina (1st title)
- Runners-up: Brazil
- Third place: Ecuador
- Fourth place: Chile

Tournament statistics
- Matches played: 36
- Goals scored: 113 (3.14 per match)

The 1985 South American Under-16 Football Championship (Spanish: Campeonato Sudamericano Sub-16 Argentina 1985, Brazilian Portuguese: Campeonato Sul-Americano Sub-16 Argentina 1985) was the inaugural edition of the South American Under-17 Football Championship, a football competition for the under-16 national teams in South America organized by CONMEBOL. It was held in Argentina from 1–22 April 1985.

Argentina were crowned champions, and together with Brazil, which were the top two teams of this tournament, alongside invitee Bolivia, qualified for the 1985 FIFA U-16 World Championship in China.

== Teams ==
- Argentina (hosts)
- Bolivia
- Brazil
- Chile
- Colombia
- Ecuador
- Peru
- Uruguay
- Venezuela

== Venues ==
The venues were José Amalfitani Stadium, and Estadio Arquitecto Ricardo Etcheverry, Buenos Aires and Estadio Jorge Luis Hirschi, La Plata.

Buenos Aires		La Plata
José Amalfitani Stadium	Estadio Arquitecto Ricardo Etcheverry	Estadio Jorge Luis Hirschi
34.635375°S 58.520711°W	34.6185°S 58.447639°W	34.911925°S 57.938794°W
Capacity:49,540 Stadium Club Atletico Velez Sarsfield	Capacity:24.442 Stadium Club Atletico Ferrocarril Oeste	Capacity:23,000 Stadium Club Atletico Estudiantes de La Plata Bs.As.

== The tournament ==
The top two teams qualified to the 1985 FIFA U-16 World Championship.

Tiebreakers

When teams finished level of points, the final rankings were determined according to:

1. goal difference
2. goals scored
3. head-to-head result between tied teams (two teams only)
4. drawing of lots

All times local, UTC−3.

Pos	Team	Pld	W	D	L	GF	GA	GD	Pts	Qualification
1	Argentina (H)	8	8	0	0	32	5	+27	16	1985 FIFA U-16 World Championship
2	Brazil	8	7	0	1	25	7	+18	14	1985 FIFA U-16 World Championship
3	Ecuador	8	4	0	4	13	13	0	8	
4	Chile	8	3	1	4	11	11	0	7	
5	Uruguay	8	3	1	4	11	13	−2	7	
6	Colombia	8	3	1	4	9	12	−3	7	
7	Peru	8	3	0	5	10	14	−4	6	
8	Bolivia	8	2	1	5	10	24	−14	5	
9	Venezuela	8	0	2	6	2	24	−22	2	

Source: RSSSF
(H) Hosts

=== Matchday 1 ===
1 April 1985	Uruguay	4–2	Bolivia
	Generali ??', ??'; Suárez ??'; Cigliutti ??'

Argentina	5–0	Venezuela

Peru	0–2	Colombia

1 April 1985	Brazil	2–1	Chile

=== Matchday 2 ===
4 April 1985	Brazil	4–0	Bolivia

Argentina	4–0	Ecuador

Peru	2–0	Chile

4 April 1985	Uruguay	2–0	Venezuela

=== Matchday 3 ===
Ecuador	4–0	Chile

Argentina	4–0	Colombia

Bolivia	1–1	Venezuela

8 April 1985	Uruguay	1–0	Peru

=== Matchday 4 ===
10 April 1985	Colombia	1–1	Uruguay
			Borges ??'

Argentina	3–1	Chile

Bolivia	3–2	Ecuador

10 April 1985	Brazil	4–1	Peru

=== Matchday 5 ===
Ecuador	0–1	Colombia

12 April 1985	Uruguay	2–3	Brazil
	Baltierra ??'; Chenlo ??'

Chile	0–0	Venezuela

Argentina	3–0	Peru

=== Matchday 6 ===
Bolivia	1–3	Peru

15 April 1985	Brazil	7–0	Venezuela

Colombia	0–4	Chile

15 April 1985	Ecuador	1–0	Uruguay

=== Matchday 7 ===
Venezuela	0–2	Peru

17 April 1985	Argentina	5–1	Uruguay
			Kalenkerián ??'

Colombia	1–2	Bolivia

17 April 1985	Brazil	2–0	Ecuador

=== Matchday 8 ===
Ecuador	3–1	Venezuela

20 April 1985	Brazil	1–0	Colombia

19 April 1985	Uruguay	0–1	Chile

Argentina	5–1	Bolivia

=== Matchday 9 ===
Peru	2–3	Ecuador

Venezuela	0–4	Colombia

Chile	4–0	Bolivia

22 April 1985	Argentina	3–2	Brazil
	Maradona 11', 67'; Frutos 54'	Report	Natalio 9'; William 19'

== Winners ==
1985 South American Under-16 Football champions

Argentina
1st title

== Qualified teams for FIFA U-16 World Championship ==
The following three teams from CONMEBOL qualified for the 1985 FIFA U-16 World Championship.

Team	Qualified on	Previous appearances in tournament
Argentina	17 April 1985	0
Brazil	17 April 1985	0
Bolivia (Invited)	17 April 1985	0
