= Matías Caicedo =

Colombian footballer (born 2009)

Personal information
- Full name: Matías Caicedo Sinisterra
- Date of birth: 25 December 2009 (age 16)
- Place of birth: Colombia
- Height: 1.82 m (6 ft 0 in)
- Position: Forward

Team information
- Current team: Independiente Yumbo
- Number: 7

Senior career*
Years	Team	Apps	(Gls)
2026–	Independiente Yumbo		

International career^{‡}
2026–	Colombia U17		
- * Club domestic league appearances and goals ‡ National team caps and goals as of 3 October 2026

Matías Caicedo Sinisterra (born 25 December 2009) is a Colombian association football player who plays as a forward for Independiente Yumbo and the Colombia under-17 national team.

He represented Colombia at the 2026 South American U-17 Championship, scoring in the final as Colombia won the tournament for the second time.

== Club career ==
=== Independiente Yumbo ===
Caicedo played for Independiente Yumbo, a club based in Yumbo, Valle del Cauca, during the 2026 Categoría Primera B season. He made his league debut during the Clausura phase and appeared in matches against Envigado and Real Cartagena. He made two league appearances during the season and did not score. On 3 August, he started in a 1–1 draw against Envigado, before appearing as a substitute in a 2–0 victory over Real Cartagena four days later.

== International career ==
=== 2026 South American U-17 Championship ===
Caicedo was selected for Colombia's 23-player squad at the 2026 South American U-17 Championship, held in Paraguay in April 2026. The tournament also served as the South American qualifying competition for the 2026 FIFA U-17 World Cup. In Colombia's final group-stage match against Paraguay on 12 April, Caicedo opened the scoring in Colombia's 2–0 victory. The result secured Colombia's qualification for the World Cup and place in the semi-finals. Colombia defeated Brazil in the semi-final and advanced to the final against Argentina. In the final, played at the CONMEBOL training complex in Luque, Caicedo scored Colombia's second goal in the 54th minute with a header. Colombia went on to win 4–0. The victory gave Colombia its second South American under-17 title, following its previous championship in 1993. ESPN subsequently described Caicedo as one of the decisive players in the final and reported that he was already looking ahead to the World Cup.

=== 2026 FIFA U-17 World Cup preparation ===
After Colombia won the South American championship, Caicedo remained involved with the under-17 national team during its preparation for the 2026 FIFA U-17 World Cup. In August 2026, he was included in a Colombia preparation squad alongside other players from clubs in the Valle del Cauca region.

In September, Colombia U17 coach Freddy Hurtado selected Caicedo for the squad that competed in the UEFA Friendship Cup, held in Switzerland from 24 September to 3 October. On 24 September 2026, Caicedo scored for Colombia in a 3–2 defeat against England under-18 in the opening match of the UEFA Friendship Cup at the Centre Sportif de Colovray in Nyon, Switzerland. With Colombia trailing 1–0, he equalized in the 31st minute with an exceptional long-range strike from just in front of the halfway line. The attempt travelled from deep inside Colombia's attacking half and found the net from a distance rarely associated with a conventional forward's finish, giving Colombia momentum against the English side. Miguel Agámez later scored Colombia's second goal, but England held on to win 3–2.

== Honours ==
Colombia U17

- South American U-17 Championship: 2026
