= 2003 South American U-17 Championship =

2003 South American Under 17 Football Championship
2003 Sudamericano Sub-17

Tournament details
- Host country: Bolivia
- Dates: 1–18 May 2003
- Teams: 10 (from 1 confederation)
- Venues: 2 (in 2 host cities)

Final positions
- Champions: Argentina (2nd title)
- Runners-up: Brazil
- Third place: Colombia
- Fourth place: Brazil

Tournament statistics
- Matches played: 26
- Goals scored: 83 (3.19 per match)
- Top scorer(s): (Argentina) Hernán Peirone (5 goals)

The 2003 South American Under-17 Football Championship was played in Bolivia from 1 to 18 May 2003. The competition was originally scheduled for 28 February – 16 March in Maracay, Venezuela - it was postponed to May and moved to Bolivia due to social unrest in Venezuela; Venezuela were awarded the organisation of the 2005 edition instead.

The host of the competition were the cities of Santa Cruz de la Sierra and Montero.

== First round ==
The 10 national teams were drawn into 2 groups of 5 teams each. The top 2 teams from each group qualified for the final round.

=== Group A ===
Team	Pts	M	W	D	L	GF	GC
Brazil	12	4	4	0	0	10	2
Uruguay	9	4	3	0	1	10	3
Chile	3	4	1	0	3	4	7
Ecuador	3	4	1	0	3	4	9
Venezuela	3	4	1	0	3	5	12

1 May 2003
Brazil	2:0	Ecuador	Santa Cruz
Chile	0:2	Uruguay	Santa Cruz
3 May 2003
Chile	1:2	Ecuador	Montero
Venezuela	0:4	Uruguay	Montero
5 May 2003
Venezuela	3:2	Ecuador	Santa Cruz
Chile	0:2	Brazil	Santa Cruz
8 May 2003
Uruguay	3:0	Ecuador	Santa Cruz
Venezuela	1:3	Brazil	Santa Cruz
10 May 2003
Venezuela	1:3	Chile	Montero
Uruguay	1:3	Brazil	Montero

=== Group B ===
Team	Pts	M	W	D	L	GF	GC
Argentina	10	4	3	1	0	14	1
Colombia	8	4	2	2	0	7	5
Paraguay	6	4	2	0	2	7	10
Peru	2	4	0	2	2	2	7
Bolivia	1	4	0	1	3	2	9

2 May 2003
Paraguay	0:5	Argentina	Santa Cruz
Peru	1:1	Bolivia	Santa Cruz
4 May 2003
Peru	0:2	Paraguay	Santa Cruz
Bolivia	0:1	Colombia	Santa Cruz
6 May 2003
Paraguay	3:4	Colombia	Montero
Argentina	3:0	Peru	Montero
9 May 2003
Argentina	1:1	Colombia	Santa Cruz
Paraguay	2:1	Bolivia	Santa Cruz
11 May 2003
Colombia	1:1	Peru	Santa Cruz
Bolivia	0:5	Argentina	Santa Cruz

== Final round ==
The final round was played in the same system that the first round, with the best 4 teams.

Equipo	Pts	PJ	PG	PE	PP	GF	GC
Argentina	5	3	1	2	0	5	4
Brazil	4	3	1	1	1	5	2
Colombia	4	3	1	1	1	4	5
Uruguay	3	3	1	0	2	4	7

14 May 2003
Brazil	0:1	Colombia	Santa Cruz
Argentina	2:1	Uruguay	Santa Cruz
16 May 2003
Argentina	2:2	Colombia	Santa Cruz
Brazil	4:0	Uruguay	Santa Cruz
18 May 2003
Uruguay	3:1	Colombia	Santa Cruz
Brazil	1:1	Argentina	Santa Cruz

- Argentina, Brazil and Colombia qualified for the 2003 FIFA U-17 World Championship.

2003 South American Under-17 Football champions

Argentina
Second title

== Top goalscorers ==
Team	Players	Goals
(Argentina)	Hernán Peirone	5
