= Adrián Cuadrado =

Ecuadorian footballer (born 2009)

Personal information
- Full name: Adrián Cuadrado Sal
- Date of birth: 10 March 2009 (age 17)
- Place of birth: Barcelona, Spain
- Height: 1.78 m (5 ft 10 in)
- Position: Defender

Team information
- Current team: Sabadell B (on loan from Barcelona)

Youth career
- –2023: Cornellà
- 2023–: Barcelona
- 2026–: → Sabadell (loan)

Senior career*
Years	Team	Apps	(Gls)
2026–	Barcelona	0	(0)
2026–	→ Sabadell B (loan)	0	(0)

International career^{‡}
2025–	Ecuador U17	12	(0)
- * Club domestic league appearances and goals ‡ National team caps and goals as of 19 April 2026

Adrián Cuadrado Sal (born 10 March 2009) is a footballer who plays as a defender for Sabadell B on loan from Barcelona. Born in Spain, he is an Ecuador youth international.

== Early life ==
Cuadrado was born on 10 March 2009. Born in Barcelona, Spain, he was born to an Ecuadorian father and a Spanish mother.

== Club career ==
As a youth player, Cuadrado joined the youth academy of Spanish side Cornellà. Following his stint there, he joined the youth academy of Barcelona in the Spanish La Liga ahead of the 2023–24 season.

Subsequently, he was sent on loan to the youth academy of Spanish outfit Sabadell in 2026 and was promoted to the club's reserve team the same year.

== International career ==
Cuadrado is an Ecuador youth international and has represented the country internationally at under-17 level and is eligible to represent Spain internationally, having been born in the country.

During the spring of 2025, he played for the Ecuador national under-17 football team at the 2025 South American U-17 Championship. One year later, he played for the Ecuador national under-17 football team at the 2026 South American U-17 Championship.

== Style of play ==
Cuadrado plays as a defender and has received comparisons to Netherlands international Virgil van Dijk.

Spanish newspaper Sport wrote in 2026 that "his main strengths are his concentration and effectiveness in marking".
