= Hernán Peirone =

Argentine footballer

Personal information
- Full name: Hernán Gastón Peirone
- Date of birth: May 28, 1986 (age 40)
- Place of birth: Villa del Rosario, Argentina
- Height: 1.74 m (5 ft 9 in)
- Position: Striker

Team information
- Current team: Luque

Youth career
- San Lorenzo

Senior career*
Years	Team	Apps	(Gls)
2003–2009	San Lorenzo	47	(12)
2009–2010	Emelec	10	(2)
2010	→ San Luis (loan)	15	(6)
2011	Alianza Lima	11	(2)
2012	→ Unión Temuco (loan)	29	(11)
2013	Brasil de Farroupilha	17	(14)
2013	Estudiantes RC	?	(?)
2014	Unión San Felipe	9	(4)
2014–2015	Estudiantes RC	?	(?)
2015	→ Unión de Sunchales (loan)	5	(0)
2016	Racing de Córdoba	10	(2)
2016	Deportivo Español	0	(0)
2019–2020	Atlético Carcarañá	?	(?)
2022–	Luque	?	(?)

International career
2003	Argentina U17	7	(5)
- * Club domestic league appearances and goals as of 22:35, 29 March 2009 (UTC)

Hernán Gastón Peirone (born 28 May 1986 in Villa del Rosario, Córdoba) is an Argentine football striker who plays for Argentine amateur club Luque.

Peirone has played for San Lorenzo since he came through the youth system in 2003.

Peirone has not played any first team games for San Lorenzo since 2006, he had the opportunity to sign on loan for Racing Club de Avellaneda in August 2008, but he did not sign his contract.

In 2009, he signed for the Ecuadorian Club Emelec. At his arrival in Ecuador he immediately became a solution for Emelec's scoring problems and scored some goals in both the Copa Sudamericana and the Ecuadorian championship. However, Emelec could not qualify for the final of the Ecuadorian championship and was eliminated in the second round of Copa Sudamericana.

Peirone's performances did not fully satisfy Emelec's fans expectations and he was considered one of the players to be released from the club for the 2010 season. Despite this he was given a vote of confidence by both the team's administrators and the manager and he remains in Emelec for another season.

== International career ==
Peirone has played for the Argentina under-17 and under-20 squads. He was the top scorer (5 goals) of the 2003 South American Under-17 Football Championship.

== Titles ==
Season	Club	Title
Clausura 2007	San Lorenzo	Primera Division Argentina
