= Nabil Nacif =

Bolivian footballer (born 2009)

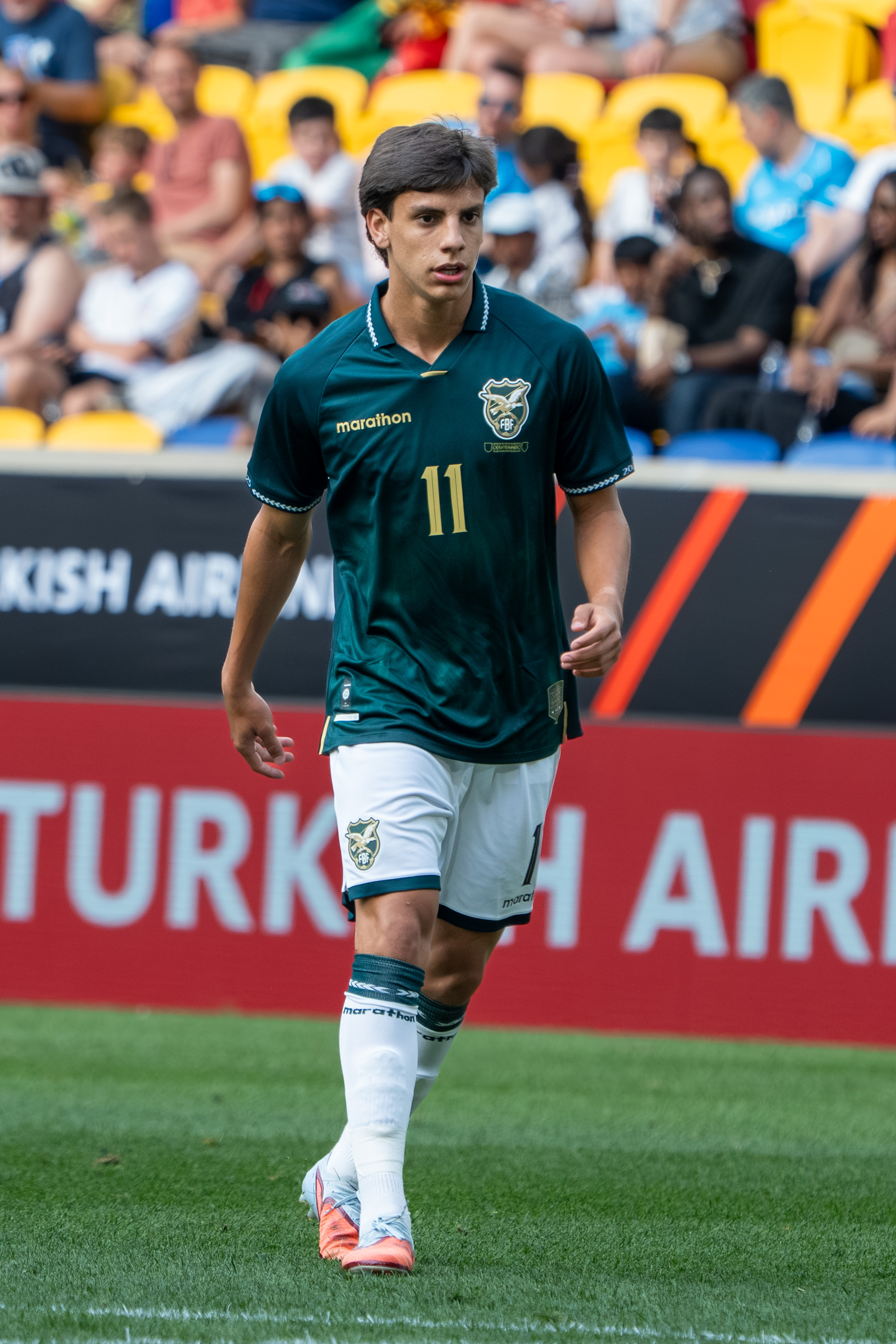
- Nacif with Bolivia in 2026

Personal information
- Full name: Nabil Nacif Joffre
- Date of birth: 19 September 2009 (age 17)
- Place of birth: Santa Cruz de la Sierra, Bolivia
- Height: 1.77 m (5 ft 10 in)
- Position: Striker

Team information
- Current team: Oriente Petrolero
- Number: 91

Youth career
- JMP Soccer School

Senior career*
| Years | Team | Apps | (Gls) |
| 2026– | Oriente Petrolero | 16 | (5) |

International career^{‡}
| 2025–2026 | Bolivia U17 | 21 | (5) |
| 2026– | Bolivia | 3 | (0) |
- * Club domestic league appearances and goals as of 9 November 2026 ‡ National team caps and goals as of 18 November 2026

Nabil Nacif Joffre (born 19 September 2009) is a Bolivian professional footballer who plays as a striker for FBF División Profesional club Oriente Petrolero and the Bolivia national team.

== Club career ==
Nacif is a graduate of JMP Soccer School. In January 2026, he joined FBF División Profesional club Oriente Petrolero. On 1 March 2026, he scored his first goal for the club in a 5–1 friendly win against Real Tomayapo. He made his professional debut on 26 April 2026 in a 2–0 league win against Real Potosí.

== International career ==
=== Youth ===
Nacif has represented Bolivia at the under-17 level. As an under-17 international, he was part of Bolivia's squads for the 2025 South American U-17 Championship, 2025 FIFA U-17 World Cup and the 2026 South American U-17 Championship. With four goals, he finished as the joint top scorer in the latter tournament.

=== Senior ===
In March 2026, Nacif received his first call-up to the Bolivia national team for a friendly match against Trinidad and Tobago. He made his debut on 6 June 2026 in a 4–0 loss to Scotland.

== Personal life ==
Nacif is of Lebanese descent. He is the youngest of six siblings. His older brother, Rashid Nacif, is also a footballer.

== Career statistics ==
=== Club ===
As of match played 8 November 2026

Appearances and goals by club, season and competition
| Club | Season | League | | | National cup | | League cup | | Continental | | Total | |
| Club | Season | Division | Apps | Goals | Apps | Goals | Apps | Goals | Apps | Goals | Apps | Goals |
|---|---|---|---|---|---|---|---|---|---|---|---|---|
| Oriente Petrolero | 2026 | FBF División Profesional | 16 | 5 | — | | 8 | 3 | — | | 24 | 8 |
| Career total | | | 16 | 5 | 0 | 0 | 8 | 3 | 0 | 0 | 24 | 8 |

=== International ===
As of match played 17 November 2026

Appearances and goals by national team and year
| National team | Year | Apps | Goals |
|---|---|---|---|
| Bolivia | 2026 | 3 | 0 |
| Total | | 3 | 0 |

== Honours ==
Individual

- South American U-17 Championship top scorer: 2026
