= Antonio Cannoni =

Chilean footballer (born 2005

Personal information
- Full name: Antonio Rubén Cannoni Miranda
- Date of birth: 2 October 2009 (age 17)
- Place of birth: Molina, Chile
- Height: 1.87 m (6 ft 2 in)
- Position: Defender

Team information
- Current team: Modena
- Number: 24

Youth career
- –2026: UC
- 2026–: Modena

Senior career*
Years	Team	Apps	(Gls)
2026–	Modena	0	(0)

International career^{‡}
2026–	Chile U17	4	(0)
- * Club domestic league appearances and goals ‡ National team caps and goals as of 21:32, 20 November 2026 (UTC)

Antonio Rubén Cannoni Miranda (born 2 October 2009) is a Chilean footballer who plays as a defender for Serie B club Modena.

== Early life ==
Cannoni was born on 4 October 2009 in Chile. The son of Chilean tennis player Macarena Miranda, he obtained an Italian passport and can speak Italian. Growing up, he regarded Chile international Gary Medel as his football idol.

== Club career ==
As a youth player, Cannoni joined the youth academy of UC. Following his stint there, he joined the youth academy of Italian side Modena in 2026 and was promoted to the club's senior team the same year. On 31 October 2026, he was first called up to them during a 1–1 home draw with Mantova in the league.

== International career ==
Cannoni is a Chile youth international and has represented the country internationally at under-17 level and is eligible to represent Italy internationally, having obtained an Italian passport.

During the spring of 2026, he played for the Chile national under-17 football team at the 2026 South American U-17 Championship. The same year, he played for the Chile national under-17 football team at the 2026 FIFA U-17 World Cup.
