= 1988 South American U-16 Championship =

Campeonato Sudamericano Sub-16 Ecuador 1988

Tournament details
- Host country: Ecuador
- City: Ibarra
- Dates: 15–30 October
- Teams: 10 (from 1 confederation)
- Venue: 3 (in 3 host cities)

Final positions
- Champions: Brazil (1st title)
- Runners-up: Argentina
- Third place: Colombia
- Fourth place: Paraguay

Tournament statistics
- Matches played: 26
- Goals scored: 69 (2.65 per match)

The 1988 South American Under-16 Football Championship (Spanish: Campeonato Sudamericano Sub-16 Ecuador 1988, Brazilian Portuguese: Campeonato Sul-Americano Sub-16 Ecuador 1988) was the 3rd edition of the South American Under-17 Football Championship, a football competition for the under-16 national teams in South America organized by CONMEBOL. It was held in Ecuador from 15 to 30 October 1988.

Brazil were crowned champions, and together with Argentina and Colombia, which were the top three teams of this tournament, qualified for the 1989 FIFA U-16 World Championship in Scotland.

== Teams ==
- Argentina
- Bolivia (title holders)
- Brazil
- Chile
- Colombia
- Ecuador (hosts)
- Paraguay
- Peru
- Uruguay
- Venezuela

== Venues ==
The venues were Estadio Olímpico, Ibarra, Cotacachi and Atuntaqui.

Ibarra	1988 South American U-16 Championship is located in Ecuador
Estadio Olímpico Municipal (Ibarra)	1988 South American U-16 Championship is located in Ecuador
Capacity: 10,000	1988 South American U-16 Championship is located in Ecuador
Cotacachi	1988 South American U-16 Championship is located in Ecuador
Estadio Olímpico Municipal (Cotacachi)	1988 South American U-16 Championship is located in Ecuador
Capacity: 10,000	1988 South American U-16 Championship is located in Ecuador
Atuntaqui	1988 South American U-16 Championship is located in Ecuador
Estadio Olímpico Jaime Terán	1988 South American U-16 Championship is located in Ecuador
Capacity: 10,000	1988 South American U-16 Championship is located in Ecuador

== First stage ==
The top two teams in each group advanced to the final stage.

Tiebreakers

When teams finished level of points, the final rankings were determined according to:

1. goal difference
2. goals scored
3. head-to-head result between tied teams (two teams only)
4. drawing of lots

All times local, ECT (UTC−5).

=== Group A ===
Pos	Team	Pld	W	D	L	GF	GA	GD	Pts	Qualification
1	Argentina	4	4	0	0	10	3	+7	8	Final stage
2	Colombia	4	1	2	1	5	4	+1	4	Final stage
3	Uruguay	4	1	1	2	5	6	−1	3	
4	Peru	4	1	1	2	5	8	−3	3	
5	Bolivia	4	0	2	2	4	8	−4	2	

Source: RSSSF

15 October 1988	Argentina	3–2	Peru

15 October 1988	Colombia	2–2	Bolivia

17 October 1988	Uruguay	3–0	Peru
	Rehermann ??', ??'; Tejera ??'

17 October 1988	Argentina	1–0	Colombia

19 October 1988	Colombia	1–1	Peru

19 October 1988	Uruguay	1–1	Bolivia
	Canobbio ??'

21 October 1988	Argentina	3–0	Bolivia

21 October 1988	Colombia	2–0	Uruguay

23 October 1988	Peru	2–1	Bolivia

23 October 1988	Argentina	3–1	Uruguay
			Rehermann ??'

=== Group B ===
Pos	Team	Pld	W	D	L	GF	GA	GD	Pts	Qualification
1	Brazil	4	4	0	0	10	1	+9	8	Final stage
2	Paraguay	4	3	0	1	5	4	+1	6	Final stage
3	Chile	4	2	0	2	8	5	+3	4	
4	Ecuador (H)	4	1	0	3	3	6	−3	2	
5	Venezuela	4	0	0	4	1	11	−10	0	

Source: RSSSF
(H) Hosts

14 October 1988	Brazil	2–0	Paraguay

14 October 1988	Ecuador	1–0	Venezuela

16 October 1988	Chile	4–0	Venezuela
	Loyola ??', ??'; Ahumada ??'; Jorquera ??'

16 October 1988	Paraguay	2–1	Ecuador

18 October 1988	Brazil	5–1	Venezuela

18 October 1988	Chile	3–1	Ecuador
	Pinto ??'; Lira ??'; Yáñez ??'

20 October 1988	Brazil	2–0	Chile

20 October 1988	Paraguay	1–0	Venezuela

22 October 1988	Paraguay	2–1	Chile
			Jara ??'

22 October 1988	Brazil	1–0	Ecuador

== Final stage ==
When teams finished level of points, the final rankings were determined according to the same criteria as the first stage, taking into account only matches in the final stage.

Pos	Team	Pld	W	D	L	GF	GA	GD	Pts	Qualification
1	Brazil	3	2	1	0	4	0	+4	5	1989 FIFA U-16 World Championship
2	Argentina	3	2	0	1	3	1	+2	4	1989 FIFA U-16 World Championship
3	Colombia	3	1	1	1	2	2	0	3	1989 FIFA U-16 World Championship
4	Paraguay	3	0	0	3	1	7	−6	0	

Source: RSSSF

26 October 1988	Brazil	0–0	Colombia

26 October 1988	Argentina	2–0	Paraguay

28 October 1988	Brazil	3–0	Paraguay

28 October 1988	Argentina	1–0	Colombia

30 October 1988	Colombia	2–1	Paraguay

30 October 1988	Brazil	1–0	Argentina

== Winners ==
1988 South American Under-16 Football champions

Brazil
1st title

== Qualified teams for FIFA U-16 World Championship ==
The following three teams from CONMEBOL qualified for the 1989 FIFA U-16 World Championship.

Team	Qualified on	Previous appearances in tournament^{1}
Argentina	28 October 1988	1 (1985)
Brazil	28 October 1988	2 (1985, 1987)
Colombia	30 October 1988	0
