= Johan Martínez =

Ecuadorian footballer (born 2007)

Personal information
- Full name: Johan Andrés Martínez Briones
- Date of birth: 10 May 2009 (age 17)
- Place of birth: Esmeraldas Province, Ecuador
- Height: 1.73 m (5 ft 8 in)
- Position: Winger

Team information
- Current team: Newcastle United FC

Youth career
- –2027: Independiente del Valle
- 2027–: Newcastle United FC

International career^{‡}
Years	Team	Apps	(Gls)
2026–	Ecuador U17	3	(0)
- ‡ National team caps and goals as of 7 April 2026

Johan Andrés Martínez Briones (born 10 May 2009) is an Ecuadorian professional footballer who plays as a winger for Newcastle United FC.

== Early life ==
Martínez was born on 10 May 2009. Born in Esmeraldas Province, Ecuador, he is of Colombian descent through his parents.

== Club career ==
As a youth player, Martínez joined the youth academy of Ecuadorian side Independiente del Valle, helping the club's under-17 team win the league title. During the summer of 2027, he will join the youth academy of English Premier League side Newcastle United FC.

== International career ==
Martínez is an Ecuador youth international. During the spring of 2026, he played for the Ecuador national under-17 football team at the 2026 South American U-17 Championship.

== Style of play ==
Martínez plays as a winger. Ecuadorian news website wrote in 2026 that he is "known for his speed, dribbling skills, and ability to unbalance defenses in one-on-one situations . He is left-footed but comfortable using both feet".
