= 2026 South American U-17 Championship =

CONMEBOL Sudamericano Sub-17 Paraguay 2026

Tournament details
- Host country: Paraguay
- Dates: 3–19 April
- Teams: 10 (from 1 confederation)
- Venues: 4 (in 4 host cities)

Final positions
- Champions: Colombia (2nd title)
- Runners-up: Argentina
- Third place: Brazil
- Fourth place: Ecuador

Tournament statistics
- Matches played: 28
- Goals scored: 78 (2.79 per match)
- Top scorer(s): (Bolivia) Nabil Nacif (Brazil) Eduardo Pape (Colombia) José Escorcia (4 goals each)

The 2026 South American U-17 Championship was the 21st edition of the South American U-17 Championship (Spanish: CONMEBOL Sudamericano Sub-17, Portuguese: CONMEBOL Sul-Americano Sub-17), the annual international youth football championship organised by CONMEBOL for the men's under-17 national teams of South America. It was held in Paraguay from 3 to 19 April 2026.

As in the previous edition, the tournament served as the CONMEBOL qualifiers for the FIFA U-17 World Cup. The top seven teams qualified for the 2026 FIFA U-17 World Cup in Qatar as the CONMEBOL representatives.

Brazil were the defending champions, but they were eliminated by Colombia in the semi-finals, who went on to defeat Argentina 4–0 in the final for a second title, and a first since 1993.

== Host and venues ==
Paraguay was chosen as the host country for the tournament during the CONMEBOL Council meeting held on 26 February 2026 in Rio de Janeiro, Brazil. Previously, reports indicated that Chile had also requested to host the event, a proposal that ultimately did not succeed.

This was the fourth time that Paraguay hosted the tournament, having previously done so in 1991, 1997 and 2015.

== Teams ==
All ten CONMEBOL member national teams were eligible to enter the tournament.

Team	Appearance	Previous best performance
Argentina	21st	Champions (4 times, most recent 2019)
Bolivia	21st	Champions (1 time, 1986)
Brazil (holders)	21st	Champions (14 times, most recent 2025)
Chile	21st	Runners-up (3 times, most recent 2019)
Colombia	21st	Champions (1 time, 1993)
Ecuador	20th	Runners-up (1 time, 2023)
Paraguay (hosts)	20th	Runners-up (1 time, 1999)
Peru	21st	Fourth place (1 time, 2007)
Uruguay	21st	Runners-up (3 times, most recent 2011)
Venezuela	21st	Runners-up (1 time, 2013)

=== Squads ===
Each team could register a squad of a minimum of 19 and a maximum of 23 players, including at least 3 goalkeepers. Players born between 1 January 2009 and 31 December 2011 (ages 15 to 17) were eligible to compete in the tournament (Regulations Articles 47 and 50).

== Draw ==
The draw of the tournament was held on 10 March 2026, 12:00 PYT (UTC−3), at the CONMEBOL headquarters in Luque, Paraguay with the ten teams being drawn into two groups of five. The hosts Paraguay and defending champions Brazil were seeded into Group A and Group B respectively and assigned to position 1 in their group, while the remaining teams were placed into four "pairing pots" according to their results in the 2025 South American U-17 Championship (shown in brackets).

Seeded	Pot 1	Pot 2	Pot 3	Pot 4
Paraguay (6) (Hosts, assigned to A1); Brazil (1) (Title holders, assigned to B1)	Colombia (2); Venezuela (3)	Chile (4); Argentina (5)	Bolivia (7); Ecuador (8)	Uruguay (9); Peru (10)

From each pot, the first team drawn was placed into Group A and the second team drawn was placed into Group B. In both groups, teams from pot 1 were allocated in position 2, teams from pot 2 in position 3, teams from pot 3 in position 4 and teams from pot 4 in position 5.

The draw resulted in the following groups:

Group A
Pos	Team
A1	Paraguay
A2	Colombia
A3	Chile
A4	Ecuador
A5	Uruguay

Group B
Pos	Team
B1	Brazil
B2	Venezuela
B3	Argentina
B4	Bolivia
B5	Peru

== Match officials ==
On 17 March 2026, the CONMEBOL Referee Commission announced a total of ten referees and twenty assistant referees appointed for the tournament.

- (Argentina) Andrés Gariano
  - Assistants: Carla López and Gisela Bosso
- (Bolivia) Rodolfo Vera
  - Assistants: Richard Orellana and Luis Valdez
- (Brazil) Thayslane Costa
  - Assistants: Daniela Coutinho and Anne Gomes de Sá
- (Chile) Mathías Riquelme
  - Assistants: Wladimir Muñoz and Yasna Moreno
- (Colombia) Jairo Mayorga
  - Assistants: Roberto Padilla and Iris Calderón
- (Ecuador) Oswaldo Contreras
  - Assistants: Andrés Tola and Mauricio Lozada
- (Paraguay) David Ojeda
  - Assistants: Esteban Testta and Liz Fleitas
- (Peru) Edwin Ordoñez
  - Assistants: Coty Carrera and Enrique Pinto
- (Uruguay) Mathías de Armas
  - Assistants: Héctor Bergalo and Mathías Muníz
- (Venezuela) Yeferzon Miranda
  - Assistants: Antoni García and Paolo García

== Group stage ==
The top two teams in each group advanced to the final four, the next two teams advanced to the 5th–8th place play-offs, and the two bottom teams were eliminated.

Tiebreakers

In the group stage, teams were ranked according to points earned (3 points for a win, 1 point for a draw, 0 points for a loss). If tied on points, tiebreakers were applied in the following order (Regulations Article 20):

1. Head-to-head result between tied teams;
  - Points in head-to-head matches among the tied teams;
  - Goal difference in head-to-head matches among the tied teams;
  - Goals scored in head-to-head matches among the tied teams;
2. Goal difference in all group matches;
3. Goals scored in all group matches;
4. Fewest red cards received;
5. Fewest yellow cards received;
6. Drawing of lots.

All match times are local times, PYT (UTC−3), as listed by CONMEBOL.

=== Group A ===
Pos	Team	Pld	W	D	L	GF	GA	GD	Pts	Qualification
1	Ecuador	4	3	1	0	7	3	+4	10	Final four and 2026 FIFA U-17 World Cup
2	Colombia	4	2	1	1	3	2	+1	7	Final four and 2026 FIFA U-17 World Cup
3	Uruguay	4	1	2	1	5	4	+1	5	5th–8th places
4	Chile	4	1	1	2	3	5	−2	4	5th–8th places
5	Paraguay (H)	4	0	1	3	2	6	−4	1	

Rules for classification: Tiebreakers
(H) Hosts
3 April 2026
17:00

Uruguay	1–1	Chile
Da Silva 11'	Report	López 90+4'

Estadio CARFEM, Ypané
Referee: Edwin Ordóñez (Peru)
3 April 2026
20:00

Paraguay	1–2	Ecuador
Romañach 22'	Report	Soto 81'; H. Quintero 90+2'

Estadio CARFEM, Ypané
Referee: Rodolfo Vera (Bolivia)

5 April 2026
17:00

Ecuador	0–0	Colombia
	Report

Estadio CARFEM, Ypané
Referee: Thayslane Costa (Brazil)
5 April 2026
20:00

Uruguay	1–1	Paraguay
T. Mora 39'	Report	V. López 25'

Estadio CARFEM, Ypané
Referee: Andrés Gariano (Argentina)

7 April 2026
17:00

Ecuador	2–1	Uruguay
Chica 12'; Guerrero 67'	Report	Scotti 28'

Estadio CARFEM, Ypané
Referee: Yeferzon Miranda (Venezuela)
7 April 2026
20:00

Colombia	1–0	Chile
Escorcia 45+4' (pen.)	Report

Estadio CARFEM, Ypané
Referee: Rodolfo Vera (Bolivia)

9 April 2026
17:00

Colombia	0–2	Uruguay
	Report	Brizuela 9', 63'

Estadio CARFEM, Ypané
Referee: Andrés Gariano (Argentina)
9 April 2026
20:00

Chile	1–0	Paraguay
Pérez 31'	Report

Estadio CARFEM, Ypané
Referee: Thayslane Costa (Brazil)

12 April 2026
20:00

Paraguay	0–2	Colombia
	Report	Caicedo 28'; Mosquera 81'

Estadio CARFEM, Ypané
Referee: Yeferzon Miranda (Venezuela)
12 April 2026
20:00

Chile	1–3	Ecuador
Vera 90+2'	Report	Martínez 8'; E. Quintero 20'; Fragozo 74'

Estadio Ameliano, Villeta
Referee: Edwin Ordóñez (Peru)

=== Group B ===
Pos	Team	Pld	W	D	L	GF	GA	GD	Pts	Qualification
1	Brazil	4	4	0	0	13	1	+12	12	Final four and 2026 FIFA U-17 World Cup
2	Argentina	4	2	1	1	8	7	+1	7	Final four and 2026 FIFA U-17 World Cup
3	Bolivia	4	1	2	1	5	8	−3	5	5th–8th places
4	Venezuela	4	1	1	2	5	6	−1	4	5th–8th places
5	Peru	4	0	0	4	2	11	−9	0	

Rules for classification: Tiebreakers
4 April 2026
17:00

Peru	1–4	Argentina
Aranda 39'	Report	Alcaraz 31', 52'; Goytia 61', 63'

Estadio Ameliano, Villeta
Referee: David Ojeda (Paraguay)
4 April 2026
20:00

Brazil	5–0	Bolivia
Conceição 4'; Furquim 28', 40', 51'; Pape 32'	Report

Estadio Ameliano, Villeta
Referee: Jairo Mayorga (Colombia)

6 April 2026
17:00

Bolivia	2–2	Venezuela
Nacif 60'; Guerra 90+1'	Report	Sánchez 17'; Lozada 43'

Estadio Ameliano, Villeta
Referee: Oswaldo Contreras (Ecuador)
6 April 2026
20:00

Peru	1–4	Brazil
Del Piero 19'	Report	Gormley 35' (o.g.); Riquelme 36'; Bezerra 51'; Pape 59'

Estadio Ameliano, Villeta
Referee: Mathías de Armas (Uruguay)

8 April 2026
17:00

Bolivia	2–0	Peru
Nacif 27', 41'	Report

Estadio Ameliano, Villeta
Referee: Mathías Riquelme (Chile)
8 April 2026
20:00

Venezuela	2–3	Argentina
Tapia 70' (o.g.); Saavedra 90+4' (pen.)	Report	Cruz 14', 39'; Tapia 64' (pen.)

Estadio Ameliano, Villeta
Referee: Jairo Mayorga (Colombia)

10 April 2026
17:00

Venezuela	1–0	Peru
Sánchez 14'	Report

Estadio Ameliano, Villeta
Referee: Oswaldo Contreras (Ecuador)
10 April 2026
20:00

Argentina	0–3	Brazil
	Report	Riquelme 15', 39'; Conceição 89'

Estadio Ameliano, Villeta
Referee: David Ojeda (Paraguay)

12 April 2026
17:00

Brazil	1–0	Venezuela
Pape 39' (pen.)	Report

Estadio Ameliano, Villeta
Referee: Mathías de Armas (Uruguay)
12 April 2026
17:00

Argentina	1–1	Bolivia
Salinas 48'	Report	Nacif 86'

Estadio CARFEM, Ypané
Referee: Mathías Riquelme (Chile)

== Final stage ==
The final stage was played on a single-elimination basis and consisted of the 5th–8th play-off matches, semi-finals, third place match and final. If a match was level at the end of normal playing time, the winner was decided directly by a penalty shoot-out (no extra time was played).

All match times are local times, PYT (UTC−3), as listed by CONMEBOL.

=== 5th–8th places ===
The 5th–8th semi-finals matchups were:

- Group A third place vs Group B fourth place
- Group B third place vs Group A fourth place

5th–8th semi-finals
16 April – Villeta
Uruguay	3
Venezuela	0
16 April – Villeta
Bolivia	0
Chile	4

Fifth place
18 April – Villeta
Uruguay	2
Chile	3
Seventh place
18 April – Villeta
Venezuela	1
Bolivia	0

==== 5th–8th semi-finals ====
Winners qualified for the 2026 FIFA U-17 World Cup.

16 April 2026
17:00

Uruguay	3–0	Venezuela
Gancheff 34'; Scotti 71'; Brizuela 73'	Report

Estadio Ameliano, Villeta
Referee: Jairo Mayorga (Colombia)

16 April 2026
20:00

Bolivia	0–4	Chile
	Report	Riveros 32'; Muñoz 45'; Orostica 51'; Cerda 90+5'

Estadio Ameliano, Villeta
Referee: Thayslane Costa (Brazil)

==== Seventh place match ====
The winner qualified for the 2026 FIFA U-17 World Cup.

18 April 2026
17:00

Venezuela	1–0	Bolivia
Saavedra 34'	Report

Estadio Ameliano, Villeta
Referee: Andrés Gariano (Argentina)

==== Fifth place match ====
18 April 2026
20:00

Uruguay	2–3	Chile
De Lima 45+1'; Fernández 84'	Report	Riveros 52', 61'; López 59'

Estadio Ameliano, Villeta
Referee: Rodolfo Vera (Bolivia)

=== Final four ===
The semi-final matchups were:

- Semi-final 1 (SF1): Group A winners vs Group B runners-up
- Semi-final 2 (SF2): Group B winners vs Group A runners-up

Semi-finals
16 April – Asunción
Ecuador	1
Argentina	3
16 April – Asunción
Brazil	0
Colombia	3

Final
19 April – Luque
Argentina	0
Colombia	4
Third place
19 April – Villeta
Ecuador	0
Brazil	1

==== Semi-finals ====
16 April 2026
17:00

Brazil	0–3	Colombia
	Report	Mosquera 53'; Escorcia 67', 90+5'

Estadio Defensores del Chaco, Asunción
Referee: Edwin Ordóñez (Peru)

16 April 2026
20:00

Ecuador	1–3	Argentina
H. Quintero 63' (pen.)	Report	Salinas 10'; Policella 79'; Barrionuevo 87'

Estadio Defensores del Chaco, Asunción
Referee: Mathías Riquelme (Chile)

==== Third place match ====
19 April 2026
17:00

Ecuador	0–1	Brazil
	Report	Pape 9'

Estadio Ameliano, Villeta
Referee: Mathías de Armas (Uruguay)

==== Final ====
19 April 2026
20:00

Argentina	0–4	Colombia
	Report	Agámez 45+15', 58'; Caicedo 54'; Escorcia 83'

Cancha CONMEBOL, Luque
Referee: David Ojeda (Paraguay)

== Qualified teams for FIFA U-17 World Cup ==
The following seven teams qualified from CONMEBOL for the 2026 FIFA U-17 World Cup in Qatar.

Team	Qualified on	Previous appearances in FIFA U-17 World Cup^{1}
Brazil	10 April 2026	19 (1985, 1987, 1989, 1991, 1995, **1997**, **1999**, 2001, **2003**, 2005, 2007, 2009, 2011, 2013, 2015, 2017, **2019**, 2023, 2025)
Argentina	12 April 2026	16 (1985, 1989, 1991, 1993, 1995, 1997, 2001, 2003, 2007, 2009, 2011, 2013, 2015, 2019, 2023, 2025)
Ecuador	12 April 2026	6 (1987, 1995, 2011, 2015, 2019, 2023)
Colombia	12 April 2026	7 (1989, 1993, 2003, 2007, 2009, 2017, 2025)
Uruguay	16 April 2026	6 (1991, 1999, 2005, 2009, 2011, 2013)
Chile	16 April 2026	6 (1993, 1997, 2015, 2017, 2019, 2025)
Venezuela	18 April 2026	3 (2013, 2023, 2025)

^{1} Bold indicates champions for that year. Italic indicates hosts for that year.
