= José Escorcia =

Colombian footballer (born 2009)

Personal information
- Full name: José Rafael Escorcia De La Cruz
- Date of birth: 4 July 2009 (age 17)
- Place of birth: Cartagena, Colombia
- Height: 1.76 m (5 ft 9 in)
- Positions: Winger; forward (Note: El Tiempo describes Escorcia as left-footed, while El Colombiano and Pulzo describe him as right-footed.)

Team information
- Current team: Atlético Nacional (youth)

Youth career
- Unión Real
- Academia de Crespo
- 2023: Oriente FC
- 2024–: Atlético Nacional

International career
Years	Team	Apps	(Gls)
2025	Colombia U16		
2025–	Colombia U17		
Medal record
Men's football
Representing Colombia
South American U-17 Championship
Winner	2026 Paraguay

José Rafael Escorcia De La Cruz (born 4 July 2009) is a Colombian footballer who plays as a winger or forward for the youth system of Atlético Nacional and the Colombia national under-17 team.

A native of Cartagena, Escorcia played youth football in Bolívar and Antioquia before joining Atlético Nacional's academy in 2024, after being scouted at Oriente FC. With Nacional's under-16 side, he won the Torneo Internacional Pioneros in Montevideo, Uruguay.

Escorcia represented Colombia at under-16 level before making his debut for the under-17s in 2025, and played at the 2025 FIFA U-17 World Cup in Qatar. He finished as top scorer at the 2026 South American U-17 Championship in Paraguay, which Colombia won for the first time since 1993, qualifying for the 2026 FIFA U-17 World Cup.

== Early life ==
Escorcia grew up in Cartagena, idolizing fellow Caribbean-coast attackers Luis Díaz and Jorge Carrascal. He began playing in his home department of Bolívar with the clubs Unión Real and Academia de Crespo, then moved to Antioquia at a young age, where he went on to represent the department in the Difútbol youth tournaments. Despite several years in Antioquia, he has kept a distinctive Cartagena accent.

== Youth career ==
In 2023, while playing for Oriente FC in the Liga Antioqueña de Fútbol, Escorcia was spotted by Atlético Nacional scout Camilo Pérez, who was drawn to his dribbling and his ability to beat opponents. Pérez followed him for about a year before recommending him to the club, and Escorcia joined Nacional's academy in early 2024. Known as "Vini" at the club, he won the Torneo Internacional Pioneros in Montevideo, Uruguay, with Nacional's under-16 side, scoring during the competition. In July 2026, Infobae reported that he had yet to make his professional debut but was viewed at the club as one of its most promising academy players.

== International career ==
=== Youth ===
Escorcia received his first call-up to a Colombia national team on 18 February 2025, when he joined the under-16 squad. With the under-16s, he played at the International Dream Cup in Japan and the UEFA Under-16 Development Tournament in Murcia, Spain.

He was not part of the squad that finished as runners-up at the 2025 South American U-17 Championship in Cartagena, watching the final from Atlético Nacional's team residence nearby. In September 2025, coach Fredy Hurtado called him up to the under-17 team for the first time. After playing in the final warm-up friendly against Venezuela in Ocaña, he was named in Colombia's squad for the 2025 FIFA U-17 World Cup in Qatar, one of the few players born in 2009 in a squad eligible for players born from 2008.

At the World Cup, Escorcia started Colombia's opening match, a 1–1 draw with Germany on 4 November at Aspire Zone in Doha, and also started the 2–0 win over North Korea that took Colombia into the round of 32 as runners-up in Group G. He started again in the round of 32 on 14 November, a 2–0 defeat to France that ended Colombia's tournament. He appeared in all four of Colombia's matches without scoring, becoming the 12th footballer from Bolívar to play at a FIFA World Cup tournament.

=== 2026 South American U-17 Championship ===
Escorcia was one of Colombia's leading players at the 2026 South American U-17 Championship in Paraguay. After a goalless draw with Ecuador in Colombia's opening match, he scored the only goal of a 1–0 win over Chile from the penalty spot, after the Chilean goalkeeper tripped a Colombian player who was leaving the area. In the semi-final on 17 April, he scored twice in a 3–0 win over Brazil, the team that had beaten Colombia in the 2025 final.

In the final against Argentina on 19 April in Luque, Escorcia beat two defenders down the left and crossed for Miguel Agámez to head in Colombia's third goal, then scored the fourth himself in the 84th minute, rounding the goalkeeper to complete a 4–0 win. The title was Colombia's second in the competition and its first since 1993. Escorcia finished the tournament with four goals and two assists in six matches, and received the competition's top-scorer award. Colombia's run secured qualification for the 2026 FIFA U-17 World Cup in Qatar.

=== Build-up to the 2026 U-17 World Cup ===
In July 2026, The Athletic included Escorcia in a projected breakout XI of players who could feature at the 2030 FIFA World Cup, drawn up with the youth-scouting platform Eyeball. In September 2026, he started for Colombia at the UEFA Friendship Cup, an under-18 invitational tournament in Nyon, Switzerland, which the team used as preparation for the 2026 U-17 World Cup.

== Style of play ==
Escorcia is a winger who can play on either flank, combining dribbling and the ability to beat opponents one-on-one with accurate shooting from mid-range. He is comfortable using both feet, and is also quick and effective in front of goal.

== Honours ==
Colombia U17

- South American U-17 Championship: 2026

Individual

- South American U-17 Championship top scorer: 2026
