= Edgar Borges =

Uruguayan footballer (born 1969)

Édgar Borges
Personal information
- Full name: Édgar Borges Olivera
- Date of birth: 15 July 1969 (age 57)
- Place of birth: Minas de Corrales, Rivera, Uruguay
- Height: 1.64 m (5 ft 5 in)
- Position: Forward

Youth career
- Danubio

Senior career*
Years	Team	Apps	(Gls)
1988–1990	Danubio		
1991–1992	Nacional	25	(2)
1992–1994	Lille	18	(1)
1994–1995	Beauvais	17	(0)
1995	Danubio		
1996	Rangers	16	(1)
1997	Deportes Antofagasta	2	(0)
1997-1999	Grenoble	9	(1)
2000	Liverpool Montevideo		

International career
1988–1991	Uruguay	8	(0)
- * Club domestic league appearances and goals

Édgar Borges Olivera (born 15 July 1969), known as Edgar Borges, is a Uruguayan former professional footballer who played as a forward.

== Teams ==
- (Uruguay) Danubio 1988–1990
- (Uruguay) Nacional 1991–1992
- (France) Lille 1992–1994
- (France) Beauvais 1994–1995
- (Uruguay) Danubio 1995
- (Chile) Rangers 1996
- (Chile) Deportes Antofagasta 1997
- (France) Grenoble 1997–1999
- (Uruguay) Liverpool Montevideo 2000
