= Football at the 2010 South American Games =

- Dates: March 22–28

Football at the 2010 South American Games in Medellín was held from March 22 to March 28. All games were played at Estadio Envigado, Estadio Itagüi.

Colombia defeated Ecuador in the gold medal match.

== Medal summary ==
=== Medal table ===
Rank	Nation	Gold	Silver	Bronze	Total
1	Colombia (COL)	1	0	0	1
2	Ecuador (ECU)	0	1	0	1
3	Bolivia (BOL)	0	0	1	1
Totals (3 entries)		1	1	1	3

== Group stage ==
=== Group A ===
Team	Pld	W	D	L	GF	GA	GD	Pts
Colombia	3	2	1	0	6	1	+5	7
Chile	3	1	1	1	6	5	+1	4
Peru	3	0	2	1	3	6	−3	2

22-03-2010

Chile	1 – 1	Peru

Estadio Envigado, Estadio Itagüi

22-03-2010

Colombia	1 – 1	Ecuador

Estadio Envigado, Estadio Itagüi

24-03-2010

Bolivia	2 – 2	Peru

Estadio Envigado, Estadio Itagüi

24-03-2010

Colombia	2 – 0	Chile

Estadio Envigado, Estadio Itagüi

26-03-2010

Paraguay	2 – 5	Chile

Estadio Envigado, Estadio Itagüi

26-03-2010

Colombia	3 – 0	Peru

Estadio Envigado, Estadio Itagüi

=== Group B ===
Team	Pld	W	D	L	GF	GA	GD	Pts
Ecuador	3	2	1	0	10	2	+8	7
Bolivia	3	0	2	1	3	9	−6	2
Paraguay	3	0	1	2	2	7	−5	1

22-03-2010

Paraguay	0 – 0	Bolivia

Estadio Envigado, Estadio Itagüi

22-03-2010

Colombia	1 – 1	Ecuador

Estadio Envigado, Estadio Itagüi

24-03-2010

Bolivia	2 – 2	Peru

Estadio Envigado, Estadio Itagüi

24-03-2010

Ecuador	2 – 0	Paraguay

Estadio Envigado, Estadio Itagüi

26-03-2010

Ecuador	7 – 1	Bolivia

Estadio Envigado, Estadio Itagüi

26-03-2010

Paraguay	2 – 5	Chile

Estadio Envigado, Estadio Itagüi

== 5th/6th Placement ==
28-03-2010

Peru	3 – 4	Paraguay

Estadio Envigado, Estadio Itagüi

== Bronze medal match ==
28-03-2010

Chile	2 – 4	Bolivia

Estadio Envigado, Estadio Itagüi

== Gold Medal match ==
28-03-2010

Colombia	2 – 1	Ecuador

Estadio Envigado, Estadio Itagüi
