= Eduardo Pape =

Brazilian footballer (born 2009)

Personal information
- Full name: Eduardo Thiago Pape
- Date of birth: 20 March 2009 (age 17)
- Place of birth: Maravilha, Brazil
- Height: 1.86 m (6 ft 1 in)
- Position: Midfielder

Team information
- Current team: Cruzeiro

Youth career
- –2024: Azuriz
- 2024–: Cruzeiro

International career^{‡}
Years	Team	Apps	(Gls)
2026–	Brazil U17	8	(6)
2026–	Brazil U18	3	(0)
- ‡ National team caps and goals as of 30 September 2026

Eduardo Thiago Pape (born 20 March 2009) is a Brazilian professional footballer who plays as a midfielder for Cruzeiro.

== Early life ==
Pape was born on 20 March 2009. Born in Maravilha, Brazil, he is a native of Santa Catarina, Brazil.

== Club career ==
As a youth player, Pape joined the youth academy of Azuriz. Following his stint there, he joined the youth academy of Cruzeiro in 2024, where he was regarded to have established himself as a regular starter while playing for the club's under-20 team and helped them win the 2026 Copa São Paulo de Futebol Júnior.

The same year, he renewed his contract with the Celeste until 2029 with a release clause of €100 million after receiving interest from Spanish La Liga sides Real Madrid and Atlético Madrid and English Premier League outfit Chelsea.

== International career ==
Pape is a Brazil youth international and has represented the country internationally at under-17 and under-18 level and captained the Brazil national under-17 football team.

During the spring of 2026, he played for the Brazil national under-17 football team at the 2026 South American U-17 Championship. On 24 September 2026, he debuted for the Brazil national under-18 football team during a 6–0 home friendly win over the Canada men's national under-18 soccer team

== Style of play ==
Pape plays as a midfielder and is right-footed. English newspaper The Guardian wrote in 2026 that he "represents a type of player that Brazilian football has rarely produced. With a style reminiscent of the former Barcelona player Sergio Busquets... beyond his control of the game, Pape also boasts strong attacking qualities".
