= 1986 South American U-16 Championship =

Campeonato Sudamericano Sub-16 Peru 1986

Tournament details
- Host country: Peru
- City: Lima
- Dates: 4–19 October
- Teams: 10 (from 1 confederation)
- Venue: 1 (in 1 host city)

Final positions
- Champions: Bolivia (1st title)
- Runners-up: Brazil
- Third place: Ecuador
- Fourth place: Argentina

Tournament statistics
- Matches played: 26
- Goals scored: 51 (1.96 per match)
- Top scorer(s): (Bolivia) Marco Etcheverry (7 goals)
- Best player: (Bolivia) Marco Etcheverry

The 1986 South American Under-16 Football Championship (Spanish: Campeonato Sudamericano Sub-16 Peru 1986, Brazilian Portuguese: Campeonato Sul-Americano Sub-16 Peru 1986) was the 2nd edition of the South American U-17 Championship, a football competition for the under-16 national teams in South America organized by CONMEBOL. It was held in Peru from 4 to 19 October 1986.

Bolivia were crowned champions, and together with Brazil and Ecuador, which were the top three teams of this tournament, qualified for the 1987 FIFA U-16 World Championship in Canada.

== Teams ==
- Argentina (title holders)
- Bolivia
- Brazil
- Chile
- Colombia
- Ecuador
- Paraguay
- Peru (hosts)
- Uruguay
- Venezuela

== Venues ==
All games were played in Lima at the Estadio Nacional.

Lima	1986 South American U-16 Championship is located in Peru
Estadio Nacional	1986 South American U-16 Championship is located in Peru
Capacity: 45,000	1986 South American U-16 Championship is located in Peru

== First stage ==
The top two teams in each group advanced to the final stage.

Tiebreakers

When teams finished level of points, the final rankings were determined according to:

1. goal difference
2. goals scored
3. head-to-head result between tied teams (two teams only)
4. drawing of lots

All times local, PET (UTC−5).

=== Group A ===
Pos	Team	Pld	W	D	L	GF	GA	GD	Pts	Qualification
1	Bolivia	4	2	1	1	5	3	+2	5	Final stage
2	Argentina	4	1	3	0	5	4	+1	5	Final stage
3	Uruguay	4	2	1	1	4	3	+1	5	
4	Colombia	4	1	1	2	3	5	−2	3	
5	Paraguay	4	1	0	3	4	6	−2	2	

Source: RSSSF

4 October 1986	Uruguay	2–1	Colombia	Estadio Nacional, Lima
	Bianchi

4 October 1986	Bolivia	2–2	Argentina	Estadio Nacional, Lima
	Pizarro; Etcheverry

6 October 1986	Paraguay	0–2	Bolivia	Estadio Nacional, Lima
			Arandia; Etcheverry

6 October 1986	Argentina	0–0	Colombia	Estadio Nacional, Lima

8 October 1986	Colombia	1–3	Paraguay	Estadio Nacional, Lima

8 October 1986	Argentina	1–1	Uruguay	Estadio Nacional, Lima
			Miraballes

10 October 1986	Colombia	1–0	Bolivia	Estadio Nacional, Lima

10 October 1986	Paraguay	0–1	Uruguay	Estadio Nacional, Lima
			Bentancur

12 October 1986	Bolivia	1–0	Uruguay	Estadio Nacional, Lima
	Etcheverry

12 October 1986	Paraguay	1–2	Argentina	Estadio Nacional, Lima

=== Group B ===
Pos	Team	Pld	W	D	L	GF	GA	GD	Pts	Qualification
1	Ecuador	4	2	2	0	7	3	+4	6	Final stage
2	Brazil	4	1	3	0	2	1	+1	5	Final stage
3	Peru (H)	4	2	0	2	3	3	0	4	
4	Chile	4	0	3	1	3	4	−1	3	
5	Venezuela	4	0	2	2	2	6	−4	2	

Source: RSSSF
(H) Hosts

5 October 1986	Brazil	0–0	Ecuador	Estadio Nacional, Lima

5 October 1986	Venezuela	1–2	Peru	Estadio Nacional, Lima
	Rivas 39'		Cano 50' Merino 72'

7 October 1986	Brazil	0–0	Chile	Estadio Nacional, Lima

7 October 1986	Ecuador	1–0	Peru	Estadio Nacional, Lima

9 October 1986	Ecuador	3–0	Venezuela	Estadio Nacional, Lima
	García 18' Mina 26' Mejía 80'

9 October 1986	Peru	1–0	Chile	Estadio Nacional, Lima
	Rebagliati

11 October 1986	Ecuador	3–3	Chile	Estadio Nacional, Lima

11 October 1986	Venezuela	1–1	Brazil	Estadio Nacional, Lima
	Savarese 37'		Bene 77'

13 October 1986	Chile	0–0	Venezuela	Estadio Nacional, Lima

13 October 1986	Peru	0–1	Brazil	Estadio Nacional, Lima

== Final stage ==
When teams finished level of points, the final rankings were determined according to the same criteria as the first stage, taking into account only matches in the final stage.

Pos	Team	Pld	W	D	L	GF	GA	GD	Pts	Qualification
1	Bolivia	3	1	2	0	4	3	+1	4	1987 FIFA U-16 World Championship
2	Brazil	3	0	3	0	4	4	0	3	1987 FIFA U-16 World Championship
3	Ecuador	3	0	3	0	3	3	0	3	1987 FIFA U-16 World Championship
4	Argentina	3	0	2	1	2	3	−1	2	

Source: RSSSF

15 October 1986	Bolivia	1–1	Brazil	Estadio Nacional, Lima
	Etcheverry (pen.)

15 October 1986	Ecuador	0–0	Argentina	Estadio Nacional, Lima

17 October 1986	Bolivia	1–0	Argentina	Estadio Nacional, Lima
	Etcheverry

17 October 1986	Ecuador	1–1	Brazil	Estadio Nacional, Lima

19 October 1986	Brazil	2–2	Argentina	Estadio Nacional, Lima

19 October 1986	Bolivia	2–2	Ecuador	Estadio Nacional, Lima
	Etcheverry 78', 89'

== Winners ==
1986 South American Under-16 Football champions

Bolivia
1st title

== Goalscorers ==
Team	Players	Goals
(Bolivia)	Marco Etcheverry	7

== Qualified teams for FIFA U-16 World Championship ==
The following three teams from CONMEBOL qualified for the 1987 FIFA U-16 World Championship.

Team	Qualified on	Previous appearances in tournament^{1}
Bolivia	17 October 1986	1 (1985)
Brazil	19 October 1986	1 (1985)
Ecuador	19 October 1986	0
