= Eduardo Conceição =

Brazilian footballer (born 2009)

Personal information
- Full name: Eduardo Conceição Silva
- Date of birth: 7 December 2009 (age 16)
- Place of birth: São Paulo, Brazil
- Height: 1.80 m (5 ft 11 in)
- Position: Forward

Team information
- Current team: Palmeiras

Youth career
- 2018–: Palmeiras

Senior career*
Years	Team	Apps	(Gls)
2026–	Palmeiras	0	(0)

International career^{‡}
2026–	Brazil U17	2	(1)
- * Club domestic league appearances and goals as of 31 May 2026 ‡ National team caps and goals as of 7 April 2026

Eduardo Conceição Silva (born 7 December 2009), often nicknamed Dudú, is a Brazilian professional footballer who plays as a forward for Palmeiras.

== Club career ==
Born in São Paulo, Conceição is a youth product of Palmeiras, joining the club in 2018 and first playing futsal with the Campeonato Brasileiro club.

In January 2026, he signed his first professional contract with Palmeiras, just days after scoring a haul in the Copinha. Despite being the youngest player in the squad, he was a standout in the under-20 competition.

While still yet to make his senior debut, he earned wide European coverage, reporting interest from several big Champions League clubs.

On 31 May 2026, following 11 absences in the squad, he was named to Palmeiras' first-team squad for the first time, remaining on the bench in a 1–0 victory over Chapecoense in the Campeonato Brasileiro.

== International career ==
Conceição is a youth international for Brazil, being selected in the under-17 for the South American Championship in January 2026.

== Style of play ==
Conceição is described as a skilled footballer with coordination and speed, a right-footed forward able to play in every position of the front three.
