= Luis Fragozo =

Ecuadorian footballer (born 2010)

Personal information
- Full name: Luis Jorge Fragozo Castrillón
- Date of birth: 8 April 2010 (age 16)
- Place of birth: Riohacha, Colombia
- Height: 1.70 m (5 ft 7 in)
- Positions: Right winger; attacking midfielder

Team information
- Current team: Emelec
- Number: 15

Youth career
- 2020–2025: Emelec

Senior career*
Years	Team	Apps	(Gls)
2025–	Emelec	38	(1)

International career^{‡}
2025	Ecuador U15	5	(1)
2026–	Ecuador U17	6	(1)
- * Club domestic league appearances and goals as of 21:14, 13 September 2026 (UTC) ‡ National team caps and goals as of 20:18, 19 April 2026 (UTC)

Luis Jorge Fragozo Castrillón (born 8 April 2010) is a footballer who currently plays as a right-winger for Emelec. Born in Colombia, he represents Ecuador at youth level.

== Club career ==
Born in Riohacha in the La Guajira Department of Colombia, Fragozo's family moved to Ecuador when he was ten years old. Shortly after his arrival, he joined the academy of Emelec. He was promoted to the Emelec first team in mid-2024, at the age of fourteen, alongside youth teammates Leonel Cevallos and Emanuel Gonzáles. His unofficial debut would come in a pre-season friendly match against Peruvian club Alianza Lima on 12 January 2025, before he notched a goal and an assist in another friendly against local Ecuadorian club Jipijapa.

On 28 April 2025, aged fifteen years and twenty days old, Fragozo made his professional debut, coming on as a second-half substitute for Elkin Muñoz in Emelec's 1–0 loss to Técnico Universitario. In doing so, he became the youngest player in LigaPro history since its creation in 2019, breaking the record held by Paulo Uruchima. He established himself as a first-team player over the next few months, and drew interest from other Ecuadorian LigaPro clubs, as well as Brazilian club Cruzeiro, following Emelec's underwhelming mid-table finish in 2025. Despite these links, Fragozo confirmed at the end of the 2025 season that he would remain with Emelec in 2026.

Fragozo scored his first goal for Emelec in their 1–0 win against LDU Quito on 25 April 2026; having received the ball from teammate Luca Klimowicz, he drove forward into the penalty area before chipping the ball over LDU goalkeeper Gonzalo Valle. In scoring at sixteen years and seventeen days old, Fragozo became the youngest goal-scorer in Emelec history, surpassing the record held by legendary midfielder Jorge Bolaños. When asked about a potential transfer away from the club, Emelec vice-president, Christian Noboa, responded cautiously, stating "we don't want to make the mistake of selling him so quickly", and that Fragozo "needs a year as a starter, a year playing with us" before moving to another club.

== International career ==
Fragozo is eligible to represent both Colombia and Ecuador at international level; having been born in Colombia, he was granted naturalisation in Ecuador in March 2025. Despite calls for Fragozo to represent Colombia from Colombian journalists, he was called up to an Ecuadorian under-15 squad for training in April of the same year. In June 2025 he represented the nation at an under-15 international cup in Quito.

In May 2025, he was called up to act as a "sparring partner" for the Ecuador national football team; a term used for young or fringe players used to play in friendly matches against the Ecuador team for practice. He was called up again to fulfil this role in March 2026.

== Career statistics ==
As of 10 October 2026.

Appearances and goals by club, season and competition
Club	Season	League			Cup (Note: Includes Copa Ecuador)		Continental		Other		Total	
Club	Season	Division	Apps	Goals	Apps	Goals	Apps	Goals	Apps	Goals	Apps	Goals
Emelec	2025	LigaPro Serie A	11	0	2	0	0	0	—		13	0
Emelec	2026	LigaPro Serie A	27	1	1	0	0	0	—		28	1
Career total			38	1	3	0	0	0	0	0	41	1
