= Bolivia national under-17 football team =

National U-17 association football team

Bolivia Under-17
- Nickname: La Verde (The Green One)
- Association: Federación Boliviana de Fútbol
- Confederation: CONMEBOL (South America)
- Head coach: Jorge Perrotta
- Home stadium: Estadio Hernando Siles de La Paz
- FIFA code: BOL
First colours	Second colours

FIFA U-17 World Cup
- Appearances: 3 (first in 1985)
- Best result: Group stage (1985, 1987, and 2025)

CONMEBOL Sub17
- Appearances: 20 (first in 1985)
- Best result: Champions (1986)

Pan American Games
- Appearances: 1 (first in 2007)
- Best result: Fourth Place (2007)

The Bolivia national under-17 football team represents Bolivia in international football competitions such as FIFA U-17 World Cup and South American Under-17 Football Championship.

== Competitive record ==
=== FIFA U-17 World Cup ===
Year	Result	Pld	W	D	L	GF	GA
(China) 1985	Group stage	3	0	1	2	2	6
(Canada) 1987	Group stage	3	0	1	2	6	9
(Scotland) 1989	Did not qualify						
(Italy) 1991	Did not qualify						
(Japan) 1993	Did not qualify						
(Ecuador) 1995	Did not qualify						
(Egypt) 1997	Did not qualify						
(New Zealand) 1999	Did not qualify						
(Trinidad and Tobago) 2001	Did not qualify						
(Finland) 2003	Did not qualify						
(Peru) 2005	Did not qualify						
(South Korea) 2007	Did not qualify						
(Nigeria) 2009	Did not qualify						
(Mexico) 2011	Did not qualify						
(United Arab Emirates) 2013	Did not qualify						
(Chile) 2015	Did not qualify						
(India) 2017	Did not qualify						
(Brazil) 2019	Did not qualify						
(Indonesia) 2023	Did not qualify						
(Qatar) 2025	Group stage	3	0	1	2	1	7
(Qatar) 2026	Did not qualify						
(Qatar) 2027	To be determined						
(Qatar) 2028	To be determined						
(Qatar) 2029	To be determined						
Total	3/24	9	0	3	6	9	22

=== South American U-17 Championship ===
Year	Result	Pld	W	D	L	GS	GA
(Argentina) 1985	Round-robin	8	2	1	5	10	24
(Peru) 1986	Champions	7	3	3	1	9	6
(Ecuador) 1988	Group stage	4	0	2	2	4	8
(Paraguay) 1991	Group stage	4	0	0	4	0	33
(Colombia) 1993	Group stage	4	0	0	4	0	20
(Peru) 1995	Group stage	4	1	1	2	2	5
(Paraguay) 1997	Group stage	4	0	0	4	1	15
(Uruguay) 1999	Group stage	4	1	1	2	5	6
(Peru) 2001	Group stage	4	1	0	3	7	15
(Bolivia) 2003	Group stage	4	0	1	3	2	9
(Venezuela) 2005	Group stage	4	1	0	3	8	14
(Ecuador) 2007	Group stage	4	2	0	2	5	11
(Chile) 2009	Fifth slace	7	2	2	3	9	10
(Ecuador) 2011	Group stage	4	1	0	3	5	9
(Argentina) 2013	Group stage	4	0	1	3	3	10
(Paraguay) 2015	Group stage	4	1	0	3	5	14
(Chile) 2017	Group stage	4	1	0	3	3	6
(Peru) 2019	Group stage	4	0	0	4	4	13
(Ecuador) 2023	Group stage	4	1	0	3	3	7
(Colombia) 2025	Seventh place	6	2	0	4	3	10
Total	20/20	92	19	12	61	89	246

== Honours ==
- CONMEBOL Sub17
  - Champions (1): 1986
- Bolivarian Games
  - Gold medal (2): 1993, 2009
  - Silver medal (1): 2022

== Current squad ==
The following players are called up to the squad for the 2026 South American U-17 Championship between 3–19 April 2026 in Paraguay.

Caps and goals correct as of 18 April 2026, after the match against Venezuela

No.	Pos.	Player	Date of birth (age)	Caps	Goals	Club
1	GK	Carlos Borda	11 March 2009 (age 17)	10	0	(Argentine Football Association) Atlético Tucumán
12	GK	Ronald Taborga	31 January 2009 (age 17)	2	0	(Bolivian Football Federation) Always Ready
23	GK	Luiz Zambrano	15 June 2009 (age 17)	0	0	(Bolivian Football Federation) San Antonio Bulo Bulo
2	DF	Jefer Ortega	13 September 2009 (age 17)	3	0	(Bolivian Football Federation) Academia de Fútbol Tahuichi Aguilera
3	DF	Matias Cuellar	22 May 2009 (age 17)	3	0	(Bolivian Football Federation) Always Ready
4	DF	Lysander Lucas	13 January 2009 (age 17)	6	0	(Brazilian Football Confederation) São Paulo
5	DF	Roberto Barbery	23 May 2009 (age 17)	6	0	(Bolivian Football Federation) Bolívar
13	DF	Erick Justiniano	26 January 2009 (age 17)	1	0	Unknown
14	DF	Pablo Lanz	13 September 2009 (age 17)	4	0	(Argentine Football Association) Atlético Tucumán
22	DF	Ian Rodríguez	22 January 2009 (age 17)	14	0	(Bolivian Football Federation) Jorge Wilstermann
6	MF	Bruno Nuñez	24 January 2009 (age 17)	9	0	(Bolivian Football Federation) Bolívar
8	MF	Quimey Vasco	23 January 2009 (age 17)	6	0	(Argentine Football Association) Gimnasia y Esgrima La Plata
10	MF	Matías Collazo	17 February 2009 (age 17)	6	0	(Bolivian Football Federation) Always Ready
15	MF	Santiago Somoya	30 March 2009 (age 17)	7	0	(Bolivian Football Federation) Always Ready
16	MF	Matías Medrano	25 February 2009 (age 17)	1	0	Free agent
21	MF	Juan Carniellio	21 April 2009 (age 17)	2	0	(Argentine Football Association) Ferro Carril Oeste
7	FW	Jhassir Guerra	25 February 2009 (age 17)	6	1	(Argentine Football Association) Sportivo Pocitos
9	FW	Nabil Nacif	19 September 2009 (age 17)	16	4	(Bolivian Football Federation) Oriente Petrolero
11	FW	Leonel Rocha	9 July 2009 (age 17)	2	0	(Argentine Football Association) Banfield
17	FW	Alejandro Ortiz	9 January 2009 (age 17)	6	0	(Mexican Football Federation) Diablos Tesistán
18	FW	Benjamín Chávez	4 February 2010 (age 16)	6	0	(Argentine Football Association) Vélez Sarsfield
19	FW	Said Mabrook	10 July 2009 (age 17)	6	0	(Bolivian Football Federation) Bolívar
20	FW	Roberto Pérez	21 May 2010 (age 16)	1	0	(Bolivian Football Federation) Always Ready
