= João Bezerra =

Brazilian footballer (born 2009)

Personal information
- Full name: João Pedro Bezerra de Oliveira Lo
- Date of birth: 29 June 2009 (age 17)
- Place of birth: Esteio, Brazil
- Height: 1.90 m (6 ft 3 in)
- Position: Forward

Team information
- Current team: Internacional
- Number: 49

Youth career
- 2018–: Internacional

Senior career*
Years	Team	Apps	(Gls)
2026–	Internacional	7	(0)

International career
2025	Brazil U16	1	(0)
2026–	Brazil U17	8	(2)
- * Club domestic league appearances and goals as of 15:29, 10 August 2026 (UTC)

João Pedro Bezerra de Oliveira Lo (born 29 June 2009), known as João Bezerra, is a Brazilian professional footballer who plays as a forward for Internacional.

== Club career ==
Born in Esteio, Rio Grande do Sul, Bezerra joined Internacional's youth sides at the age of nine. He made his first team debut on 11 January 2026, starting in a 2–1 Campeonato Gaúcho home win over Novo Hamburgo; aged 16 years, six months and 13 days, he became the youngest player to debut for the club in the 21st century.

On 30 January 2026, Bezerra renewed his contract with Inter until 2030.

== International career ==
Bezerra represented Brazil at under-16 and under-17 levels.

== Career statistics ==
As of 10 August 2026

Appearances and goals by club, season and competition
Club	Season	League			State League		National Cup		Continental		Other		Total	
Club	Season	Division	Apps	Goals	Apps	Goals	Apps	Goals	Apps	Goals	Apps	Goals	Apps	Goals
Internacional	2026	Série A	2	0	5	0	0	0	—		—		7	0
Career total			2	0	5	0	0	0	0	0	0	0	7	0
