= Freddy Hurtado =

Colombian footballer (born 1976)

Alfredo Hurtado Abadía (known as Freddy Hurtado; born 27 May 1976) is a Colombian former professional footballer who played as a right-back. He previously played with Cortuluá, Deportivo Pasto, Deportes Tolima, Deportivo Cali and Envigado.

His professional debut with Deportivo Cali was on 9 July 1997 in Cali against the club's main rivals, América de Cali. He played the full 90 minutes, in a match which Deportivo Cali won 2–0.

== Honours ==
Deportivo Cali

- League: 1998, 2005
- Copa Libertadores: 2006; runner-up 1999

Deportes Tolima

- League: 2003
