= South American U-17 Championship =

CONMEBOL Sub 17
- Organizer(s): CONMEBOL
- Founded: 1985
- Region: South America
- Teams: 10
- Qualifier for: FIFA U-17 World Cup
- Related competitions: South American Under-17 Women's Football Championship; South American U-20 Championship; South American U-15 Championship
- Current champion: Colombia (2nd title)
- Most championships: Brazil (14 titles)
- 2026 CONMEBOL Sub 17

The South American U-17 Championship (Spanish: Campeonato Sudamericano Sub-17; Portuguese: Campeonato Sul-Americano Sub-17), branded as CONMEBOL Sub 17, is a football competition held for South American under-17 teams. The tournament was born in 1985 out of a need for a classification tournament for the newly created FIFA U-16 World Cup (now the FIFA U-17 World Cup). For the first three editions (1985, 1986, and 1988), the competition was limited to under-16 teams. Afterwards, the age limit was raised one year. Since the first edition, Brazil has been the dominant force of the tournament, winning a record fourteen times.

== Results ==
Ed.	Year	Hosts	(gold) Winners	Score	(silver) Runners-up	(bronze) Third place	Score	Fourth place
1	1985	Argentina	Argentina	– (Note: Group stage, defined on points earned.)	Brazil	Ecuador	–	Chile
2	1986	Peru	Bolivia	–	Brazil	Ecuador	–	Argentina
3	1988	Ecuador	Brazil	–	Argentina	Colombia	–	Paraguay
4	1991	Paraguay	Brazil	–	Uruguay	Argentina	–	Chile
5	1993	Colombia	Colombia	–	Chile	Argentina	–	Brazil
6	1995	Peru	Brazil	–	Argentina	Uruguay	–	Chile
7	1997	Paraguay	Brazil	–	Argentina	Chile	–	Paraguay
8	1999	Uruguay	Brazil	5–0	Paraguay	Uruguay	4–2	Argentina
9	2001	Peru	Brazil	–	Argentina	Paraguay	–	Venezuela
10	2003	Bolivia	Argentina	–	Brazil	Colombia	–	Uruguay
11	2005	Venezuela	Brazil	–	Uruguay	Ecuador	–	Colombia
12	2007	Ecuador	Brazil	–	Colombia	Argentina	–	Peru
13	2009	Chile	Brazil	2–2 (6–5 p)	Argentina	Uruguay	–	Colombia
14	2011	Ecuador	Brazil	–	Uruguay	Argentina	–	Ecuador
15	2013	Argentina	Argentina	–	Venezuela	Brazil	–	Uruguay
16	2015	Paraguay	Brazil	–	Argentina	Ecuador	–	Paraguay
17	2017	Chile	Brazil	–	Chile	Paraguay	–	Colombia
18	2019	Peru	Argentina	–	Chile	Paraguay	–	Ecuador
19	2023	Ecuador	Brazil	–	Ecuador	Argentina	–	Venezuela
20	2025	Colombia	Brazil	1–1 (4–1 p)	Colombia	Venezuela	3–0	Chile
21	2026	Paraguay	Colombia	4–0	Argentina	Brazil	1–0	Ecuador

== Performances by country ==
Team	Titles	Runner-up	Third place	Fourth place
Brazil	14 (1988, 1991, 1995, 1997, 1999, 2001, 2005, 2007, 2009, 2011, 2015, 2017, 2023, 2025)	3 (1985, 1986, 2003)	2 (2013, 2026)	1 (1993)
Argentina	4 (1985*, 2003, 2013*, 2019)	7 (1988, 1995, 1997, 2001, 2009, 2015, 2026)	5 (1991, 1993, 2007, 2011, 2023)	2 (1986, 1999)
Colombia	2 (1993*, 2026)	2 (2007, 2025)	2 (1988, 2003)	3 (2005, 2009, 2017)
Bolivia	1 (1986)	—	—	—
Uruguay	—	3 (1991, 2005, 2011)	3 (1995, 1999*, 2009)	2 (2003, 2013)
Chile	—	3 (1993, 2017*, 2019)	1 (1997)	4 (1985, 1991, 1995, 2025)
Ecuador	—	1 (2023*)	4 (1985, 1986, 2005, 2015)	3 (2011*, 2019, 2026)
Paraguay	—	1 (1999)	3 (2001, 2017, 2019)	3 (1988, 1997*, 2015*)
Venezuela	—	1 (2013)	1 (2025)	2 (2001, 2023)
Peru	—	—	—	1 (2007)

* = As hosts

== Participating nations ==
Legend

- 1st – Champions
- 2nd – Runners-up
- 3rd – Third place
- 4th – Fourth place
- 5th – Fifth place
- 6th – Sixth place
- 7th – Seventh place
- 8th – Eighth place
- GS – Group stage
- × – Did not enter
- – Hosts

Team	(Argentina) 1985	(Peru) 1986	(Ecuador) 1988	(Paraguay) 1991	(Colombia) 1993	(Peru) 1995	(Paraguay) 1997	(Uruguay) 1999	(Peru) 2001	(Bolivia) 2003	(Venezuela) 2005	(Ecuador) 2007	(Chile) 2009	(Ecuador) 2011	(Argentina) 2013	(Paraguay) 2015	(Chile) 2017	(Peru) 2019	(Ecuador) 2023	(Colombia) 2025	(Paraguay) 2026	Total
Argentina	1st	4th	2nd	3rd	3rd	2nd	2nd	4th	2nd	1st	GS	3rd	2nd	3rd	1st	2nd	GS	1st	3rd	6th	2nd	20
Bolivia	8th	1st	GS	GS	GS	GS	GS	GS	GS	GS	GS	GS	5th	GS	GS	GS	GS	GS	GS	7th	8th	20
Brazil	2nd	2nd	1st	1st	4th	1st	1st	1st	1st	2nd	1st	1st	1st	1st	3rd	1st	1st	GS	1st	1st	3rd	20
Chile	4th	GS	GS	4th	2nd	4th	3rd	GS	GS	GS	GS	GS	GS	GS	GS	GS	2nd	2nd	6th	4th	5th	20
Colombia	6th	GS	3rd	GS	1st	GS	GS	GS	GS	3rd	4th	2nd	4th	5th	GS	6th	4th	GS	GS	2nd	1st	20
Ecuador	3rd	3rd	GS	GS	GS	×	GS	GS	GS	GS	3rd	6th	6th	4th	GS	3rd	6th	4th	2nd	8th	4th	19
Paraguay	×	GS	4th	GS	GS	GS	4th	2nd	3rd	GS	GS	GS	GS	6th	5th	4th	3rd	3rd	5th	5th	GS	19
Peru	7th	GS	GS	GS	GS	GS	GS	GS	GS	GS	GS	4th	GS	GS	6th	GS	GS	5th	GS	GS	GS	20
Uruguay	5th	GS	GS	2nd	GS	3rd	GS	3rd	GS	4th	2nd	GS	3rd	2nd	4th	5th	GS	6th	GS	GS	6th	20
Venezuela	9th	GS	GS	GS	GS	GS	GS	GS	4th	GS	GS	5th	GS	GS	2nd	GS	5th	GS	4th	3rd	7th	20

== Overall statistics ==
Pos	Team	Pld	W	D	L	GF	GA	GD	Pts
1	Brazil	152	104	32	16	366	140	+226	345
2	Argentina	148	79	35	34	277	153	+124	272
3	Uruguay	103	50	21	32	188	118	+70	171
4	Colombia	107	42	31	34	149	129	+20	157
5	Paraguay	95	36	22	37	150	155	-5	130
6	Ecuador	97	31	22	44	132	156	-24	115
7	Chile	89	25	23	41	123	150	-27	98
8	Peru	81	17	15	49	89	159	-70	66
9	Venezuela	87	14	19	54	79	208	-129	61
10	Bolivia	78	16	12	50	78	215	-137	60

== Men's U-17 World Cup qualifiers ==
Legend

- 1st – Champions
- 2nd – Runners-up
- 3rd – Third place
- 4th – Fourth place
- QF – Quarter-finals
- R16 – Round of 16
- R32 – Round of 32
- GS – Group Stage
- – Hosts
- Q – Qualified for upcoming tournament

Team	(China) 1985	(Canada) 1987	(Scotland) 1989	(Italy) 1991	(Japan) 1993	(Ecuador) 1995	(Egypt) 1997	(New Zealand) 1999	(Trinidad and Tobago) 2001	(Finland) 2003	(Peru) 2005	(South Korea) 2007	(Nigeria) 2009	(Mexico) 2011	(United Arab Emirates) 2013	(Chile) 2015	(India) 2017	(Brazil) 2019	(Indonesia) 2023	(Qatar) 2025	(Qatar) 2026	Total
Argentina	GS		QF	3rd	GS	3rd	QF		4th	3rd		QF	R16	R16	4th	GS		R16	4th	R32	Q	16
Bolivia	GS	GS																		GS		3
Brazil	3rd	GS	QF	QF		2nd	1st	1st	QF	1st	2nd	R16	GS	4th	QF	QF	3rd	1st	QF	4th	Q	19
Chile					3rd		GS									R16	GS	R16		GS	Q	6
Colombia			GS		GS					4th		R16	4th				R16			R32	Q	7
Ecuador		GS				QF								R16		QF		R16	R16		Q	6
Paraguay								QF	GS							GS	R16	QF		R32		6
Peru											GS	QF										2
Uruguay				GS				QF			GS		QF	2nd	QF						Q	6
Venezuela															GS				R16	R32	Q	3

== See also ==
- FIFA U-17 World Cup
- South American U-17 Women's Championship
- South American Under-15 Football Championship
- South American Youth Football Championship
