= 2025 South American U-17 Championship squads =

The 2025 South American U-17 Championship was an international football tournament held in Colombia from 27 March to 12 April 2025. The ten CONMEBOL national teams involved in the tournament were required to register a squad of a minimum of 19 and a maximum of 23 players, including at least three goalkeepers. Players born between 1 January 2008 and 31 December 2010 (ages 15 to 17) were eligible to compete in the tournament (Regulations Articles 47 and 50).

The age listed for each player is as of 27 March 2025, the first day of the tournament. A flag is included for coaches who are of a different nationality than their own national team.

== Group A ==
=== Colombia ===
Colombia announced their squad of 23 players on 23 March 2025. Óscar Gómez replaced Jerónimo Moreno in the final list.

Head coach: Freddy Hurtado

No.	Pos.	Player	Date of birth (age)	Club
1	GK	Santiago Mondragón	3 April 2008 (aged 16)	(Colombian Football Federation) Deportivo Cali
2	MF	Brait García	7 March 2008 (aged 17)	(Colombian Football Federation) Deportivo Cali
3	DF	Edmílson Herazo	19 September 2008 (aged 16)	(Colombian Football Federation) Barranquilla
4	MF	Jhon Sebastián Castro	2 September 2008 (aged 16)	(Colombian Football Federation) Internacional F.C. de Palmira
5	DF	Criss Macías	23 March 2008 (aged 17)	(Colombian Football Federation) Millonarios
6	DF	Cristian Orozco	13 July 2008 (aged 16)	(Colombian Football Federation) IYV Rojo FC
7	FW	Feder Rivas	9 January 2008 (aged 17)	(Colombian Football Federation) Atlético Nacional
8	MF	Juan Cataño	21 May 2008 (aged 16)	(Colombian Football Federation) Envigado
9	FW	Santiago Londoño	29 February 2008 (aged 17)	(Colombian Football Federation) Envigado
10	FW	Ashley Trujillo	10 December 2008 (aged 16)	(The Football Association) Queens Park Rangers
11	MF	Deivi Quiñones	24 January 2008 (aged 17)	(Ecuadorian Football Federation) LDU Quito
12	GK	David Rodríguez	25 June 2008 (aged 16)	(United States Soccer Federation) FC Cincinnati 2
13	FW	Jhon Sevillano	12 October 2008 (aged 16)	(Colombian Football Federation) Atlético Nacional
14	MF	Gilberto Saavedra	2 February 2009 (aged 16)	(Colombian Football Federation) Real Cundinamarca
15	DF	Óscar Gómez	7 February 2008 (aged 17)	(Colombian Football Federation) Atlético Huila
16	DF	Cristian Flórez	7 February 2008 (aged 17)	(Colombian Football Federation) Atlético Nacional
17	MF	Jet Lee Espín	27 January 2008 (aged 17)	(Colombian Football Federation) Millonarios
18	MF	Miguel Agámez	15 May 2009 (aged 15)	(Colombian Football Federation) Atlético Junior
19	FW	Ángel Mora	11 March 2008 (aged 17)	(Colombian Football Federation) Independiente Santa Fe
20	DF	Yeminson Urrutia	9 January 2008 (aged 17)	(Colombian Football Federation) Orsomarso
21	FW	Kevin Angulo	4 July 2008 (aged 16)	(Colombian Football Federation) América de Cali
22	GK	Jorman Mendoza	14 January 2008 (aged 17)	(Colombian Football Federation) Envigado
23	DF	Nilder Zapata	20 July 2008 (aged 16)	(Colombian Football Federation) Deportes Tolima

=== Argentina ===
Argentina announced their squad of 23 players on 27 March 2025.

Head coach: Diego Placente

No.	Pos.	Player	Date of birth (age)	Club
1	GK	Dylan Martínez	30 April 2008 (aged 16)	(Argentine Football Association) River Plate
2	DF	Mateo Martínez	27 April 2008 (aged 16)	(Argentine Football Association) Racing
3	DF	Benjamín Fariña	29 July 2008 (aged 16)	(Argentine Football Association) Lanús
4	DF	Misael Zalazar	12 March 2008 (aged 17)	(Argentine Football Association) Talleres
5	MF	Santiago Espíndola	17 March 2008 (aged 17)	(Argentine Football Association) River Plate
6	DF	Matías Satas	28 February 2008 (aged 17)	(Argentine Football Association) Boca Juniors
7	MF	Matías Acevedo	9 February 2008 (aged 17)	(Argentine Football Association) Racing
8	MF	Jerónimo Mattar	7 August 2008 (aged 16)	(Argentine Football Association) Newell's Old Boys
9	FW	Thomas de Martis	26 June 2008 (aged 16)	(Argentine Football Association) Lanús
10	MF	Francisco Baridó	31 December 2007 (aged 17)	(Italian Football Federation) Juventus
11	FW	Álex Verón	24 October 2008 (aged 16)	(Argentine Football Association) Vélez Sarsfield
12	GK	Juan Manuel Centurión	12 June 2008 (aged 16)	(Argentine Football Association) Independiente
13	DF	Thiago Yánez	6 March 2008 (aged 17)	(Argentine Football Association) Argentinos Juniors
14	DF	Santiago Silveira	24 April 2008 (aged 16)	(Argentine Football Association) Argentinos Juniors
15	MF	Alejandro Tello	8 February 2008 (aged 17)	(Argentine Football Association) Defensores Unidos
16	DF	Joaquín Salas	14 January 2008 (aged 17)	(Argentine Football Association) Talleres
17	MF	Bautista González	19 June 2008 (aged 16)	(Argentine Football Association) Independiente
18	MF	Juan Meza	14 March 2008 (aged 17)	(Argentine Football Association) River Plate
19	FW	Joaquín Piñeyro	22 February 2008 (aged 17)	(Argentine Football Association) Boca Juniors
20	MF	Tomás Parmo	8 January 2008 (aged 17)	(Argentine Football Association) Independiente
21	MF	Felipe Pujol	23 March 2008 (aged 17)	(Argentine Football Association) Vélez Sarsfield
22	FW	Uriel Ojeda	22 March 2008 (aged 17)	(Argentine Football Association) San Lorenzo
23	GK	Agustín Martínez	25 February 2008 (aged 17)	(Argentine Football Association) Talleres

=== Paraguay ===
Paraguay announced their squad of 23 players on 27 March 2025.

Head coach: (Argentina) Mariano Uglessich

No.	Pos.	Player	Date of birth (age)	Club
1	GK	Félix Fernández	10 June 2009 (aged 15)	(Paraguayan Football Association) Olimpia
2	DF	Thiago Aranda	25 February 2008 (aged 17)	(Paraguayan Football Association) Olimpia
3	DF	Christhian Ruíz	12 November 2008 (aged 16)	(Paraguayan Football Association) Olimpia
4	DF	Mateo Giménez	25 October 2009 (aged 15)	(Paraguayan Football Association) Libertad
5	DF	Jonás Rojas	3 January 2008 (aged 17)	(Paraguayan Football Association) Cerro Porteño
6	DF	Leo Cristaldo	12 January 2009 (aged 16)	(Argentine Football Association) Vélez Sarsfield
7	MF	Derlis Almada	14 February 2008 (aged 17)	(Paraguayan Football Association) Libertad
8	MF	Alan Ledesma	4 September 2008 (aged 16)	(Paraguayan Football Association) Olimpia
9	FW	Maurício de Carvalho	4 February 2008 (aged 17)	(Paraguayan Football Association) Cerro Porteño
10	MF	Carlos Franco	5 January 2008 (aged 17)	(Paraguayan Football Association) Cerro Porteño
11	MF	Tobías Jara	6 May 2009 (aged 15)	(Paraguayan Football Association) Guaraní
12	GK	Rainero Laratro	7 March 2008 (aged 17)	(Paraguayan Football Association) Libertad
13	DF	Mauro Coronel	25 May 2008 (aged 16)	(Paraguayan Football Association) Nacional
14	MF	Jhosías Campss	17 February 2008 (aged 17)	(Paraguayan Football Association) Nacional
15	MF	Aldo Sanabria	9 May 2008 (aged 16)	(Paraguayan Football Association) Cerro Porteño
16	MF	Fernando Zayas	24 October 2008 (aged 16)	(Paraguayan Football Association) Cerro Porteño
17	FW	Thiago Vera	14 June 2008 (aged 16)	(Paraguayan Football Association) Libertad
18	FW	Milan Freyres	8 December 2008 (aged 16)	(Paraguayan Football Association) Olimpia
19	DF	Alexis Acosta	23 January 2008 (aged 17)	(Paraguayan Football Association) Olimpia
20	FW	Pedro Villalba	9 July 2008 (aged 16)	(Paraguayan Football Association) Libertad
21	FW	José Buhring	17 February 2008 (aged 17)	(Paraguayan Football Association) Libertad
22	GK	Diego Rodríguez	22 July 2008 (aged 16)	(Paraguayan Football Association) Cerro Porteño
23	MF	Diego Ruiz	29 March 2008 (aged 16)	(Paraguayan Football Association) Libertad

=== Chile ===
Chile announced their squad of 23 players on 24 March 2025.

Head coach: Sebastián Miranda

No.	Pos.	Player	Date of birth (age)	Club
1	GK	Vicente Villegas	23 August 2009 (aged 15)	(Football Federation of Chile) Coquimbo Unido
2	DF	Martín Jiménez	6 February 2008 (aged 17)	(Football Federation of Chile) Audax Italiano
3	DF	Bruno Torres	20 January 2008 (aged 17)	(Football Federation of Chile) Colo-Colo
4	DF	Matías Orellana	2 May 2008 (aged 16)	(Football Federation of Chile) Colo-Colo
5	DF	Alonso Olguín	8 February 2008 (aged 17)	(Football Federation of Chile) Colo-Colo
6	MF	Sebastián Vargas	19 May 2008 (aged 16)	(Football Federation of Chile) Santiago Wanderers
7	FW	Ian Alegría	3 May 2008 (aged 16)	(Football Federation of Chile) Palestino
8	MF	Diego Molina	2 August 2008 (aged 16)	(Football Federation of Chile) Santiago Wanderers
9	FW	Yastin Cuevas	29 March 2008 (aged 16)	(Football Federation of Chile) Colo-Colo
10	FW	Zidane Yáñez	26 January 2008 (aged 17)	(United States Soccer Federation) New York City FC
11	FW	Andher González	24 October 2009 (aged 15)	(Football Federation of Chile) Universidad de Chile
12	GK	Vicente Armijo	6 February 2008 (aged 17)	(Football Federation of Chile) Unión Española
13	MF	Máximo Zúñiga	24 March 2008 (aged 17)	(Football Federation of Chile) O'Higgins
14	DF	Jaime Poblete	18 June 2008 (aged 16)	(Football Federation of Chile) Universidad de Concepción
15	DF	Ricardo Guzmán	9 March 2008 (aged 17)	(Football Federation of Chile) O'Higgins
16	MF	Nicolás Pérez	30 January 2008 (aged 17)	(Football Federation of Chile) Deportes Temuco
17	MF	Benjamín Díaz	7 January 2008 (aged 17)	(Football Federation of Chile) Universidad de Chile
18	FW	Amaro Pérez	3 September 2009 (aged 15)	(Football Federation of Chile) Universidad Católica
19	DF	Renato Núñez	3 March 2008 (aged 17)	(Football Federation of Chile) Universidad de Chile
20	MF	Cristóbal Sepúlveda	16 January 2008 (aged 17)	(Football Federation of Chile) Deportes La Serena
21	DF	Agustín Silva	6 August 2008 (aged 16)	(Football Federation of Chile) Colo-Colo
22	MF	Vicente Lehue	27 May 2008 (aged 16)	(Football Federation of Chile) Palestino
23	GK	Santiago Tapia	12 June 2008 (aged 16)	(Football Federation of Chile) Colo-Colo

=== Peru ===
Following is the Peru squad of 23 players:

Head coach: Carlos Silvestri

No.	Pos.	Player	Date of birth (age)	Club
1	GK	Tomás Dulanto	28 March 2008 (aged 16)	(Peruvian Football Federation) Sporting Cristal
2	DF	Sebastián Ortega	12 February 2009 (aged 16)	(Peruvian Football Federation) Alianza Lima
3	DF	Kevin Arteaga	3 January 2008 (aged 17)	(Peruvian Football Federation) Alianza Lima
4	DF	Samuel Pereda	28 July 2008 (aged 16)	(United States Soccer Federation) Charlotte FC
5	DF	Martín Huamán	25 July 2008 (aged 16)	(Football Federation of Chile) Audax Italiano
6	MF	Gerson Castillo	24 July 2008 (aged 16)	(Peruvian Football Federation) Sporting Cristal
7	FW	Victor Calagua	27 February 2008 (aged 17)	(Peruvian Football Federation) Universidad San Martín
8	FW	Carlos Aramburú	9 January 2009 (aged 16)	(Peruvian Football Federation) Alianza Lima
9	FW	Oliver López	20 May 2008 (aged 16)	(Peruvian Football Federation) Academia Cantolao
10	MF	Juan Ojeda	1 February 2008 (aged 17)	(Peruvian Football Federation) Universidad San Martín
11	FW	Jeampiero Falconí	19 May 2008 (aged 16)	(Peruvian Football Federation) Universidad San Martín
12	GK	Fernando Lasanta	14 September 2009 (aged 15)	(Peruvian Football Federation) Universidad San Martín
13	DF	Samir Meza	15 February 2008 (aged 17)	(Peruvian Football Federation) Deportivo Municipal
14	MF	Robinho Ormeño	28 April 2009 (aged 15)	(Peruvian Football Federation) Universitario
15	DF	Diego Pablo	29 June 2008 (aged 16)	(Peruvian Football Federation) Academia Cantolao
16	MF	Isaac Zegarra	4 June 2008 (aged 16)	(Peruvian Football Federation) Universidad San Martín
17	MF	Jeferson Hurtado	16 April 2008 (aged 16)	(Peruvian Football Federation) Alianza Lima
18	FW	Matías Martínez	21 February 2008 (aged 17)	(Peruvian Football Federation) Sporting Cristal
19	DF	Nicolás Valencia	19 June 2008 (aged 16)	(Peruvian Football Federation) Sport Boys
20	MF	Geray Motta	21 February 2009 (aged 16)	(Peruvian Football Federation) Alianza Lima
21	GK	Lucas Elías	14 August 2008 (aged 16)	(United States Soccer Federation) Atlanta United
22	FW	Marco Rívas	15 May 2008 (aged 16)	(Argentine Football Association) Tigre
23	FW	Carlos Santos	6 April 2008 (aged 16)	(Peruvian Football Federation) Deportivo Municipal

== Group B ==
=== Brazil ===
Brazil announced their squad of 23 players on 3 March 2025. On 13 March, Gabriel Mec was replaced by Kayke due an injury occurred in a training session.

Head coach: Dudu Patetuci

No.	Pos.	Player	Date of birth (age)	Club
1	GK	Arthur Nascimento	30 March 2008 (aged 16)	(Brazilian Football Confederation) Bahia
2	DF	Angelo	20 October 2008 (aged 16)	(Brazilian Football Confederation) São Paulo
3	DF	Vitor Fernandes	4 March 2008 (aged 17)	(Brazilian Football Confederation) Atlético Mineiro
4	DF	Kauã Prates	12 August 2008 (aged 16)	(Brazilian Football Confederation) Cruzeiro
5	MF	Zé Lucas	23 March 2008 (aged 17)	(Brazilian Football Confederation) Sport Recife
6	DF	Denner	25 February 2008 (aged 17)	(Brazilian Football Confederation) Corinthians
7	FW	Ruan Pablo	23 July 2008 (aged 16)	(Brazilian Football Confederation) Bahia
8	MF	Luis Felipe	2 February 2008 (aged 17)	(Brazilian Football Confederation) Palmeiras
9	FW	Naarã	12 January 2008 (aged 17)	(Brazilian Football Confederation) Fluminense
10	FW	Kayke	26 April 2008 (aged 16)	(Brazilian Football Confederation) Athletico Paranaense
11	FW	Luís Gustavo	27 February 2008 (aged 17)	(Brazilian Football Confederation) Red Bull Bragantino
12	GK	João Pedro	18 March 2008 (aged 17)	(Brazilian Football Confederation) Santos
13	DF	Luis Eduardo	16 January 2008 (aged 17)	(Brazilian Football Confederation) Grêmio
14	DF	Vitor Hugo	12 June 2008 (aged 16)	(Brazilian Football Confederation) Cruzeiro
15	MF	Gustavo Gomes	10 January 2008 (aged 17)	(Brazilian Football Confederation) Athletico Paranaense
16	DF	Rafael Gonzaga	7 February 2008 (aged 17)	(Brazilian Football Confederation) Santos
17	MF	Tiago Augusto	2 February 2008 (aged 17)	(Brazilian Football Confederation) Grêmio
18	MF	Felipe de Morais	29 August 2008 (aged 16)	(Brazilian Football Confederation) Cruzeiro
19	FW	Dell	9 June 2008 (aged 16)	(Brazilian Football Confederation) Bahia
20	MF	Andrey Fernandes	5 February 2008 (aged 17)	(Brazilian Football Confederation) Vasco da Gama
21	FW	Wesley Natã	18 April 2008 (aged 16)	(Brazilian Football Confederation) Fluminense
22	GK	Kaio de Assis	3 May 2008 (aged 16)	(Brazilian Football Confederation) Atlético Mineiro
23	DF	Arthur Ryan	18 March 2008 (aged 17)	(Brazilian Football Confederation) Fluminense

=== Ecuador ===
Ecuador announced their squad of 23 players on 8 March 2025.

Head coach: Juan Carlos Burbano

No.	Pos.	Player	Date of birth (age)	Club
1	GK	Miguel Peralta	26 April 2008 (aged 16)	(Ecuadorian Football Federation) Independiente del Valle
2	DF	Virgilio Olaya	4 February 2008 (aged 17)	(Ecuadorian Football Federation) Aucas
3	DF	Deinner Ordóñez	29 October 2009 (aged 15)	(Ecuadorian Football Federation) Independiente del Valle
4	DF	Darío Castillo	6 February 2008 (aged 17)	(Ecuadorian Football Federation) Barcelona SC
5	MF	Bolívar Tobar	28 August 2008 (aged 16)	(Ecuadorian Football Federation) Emelec
6	MF	Fricio Caicedo	17 April 2008 (aged 16)	(Ecuadorian Football Federation) LDU Quito
7	MF	Iker Mantilla	6 February 2009 (aged 16)	(Royal Spanish Football Federation) Mallorca
8	MF	Cristhian Ortiz	5 January 2008 (aged 17)	(Ecuadorian Football Federation) Orense
9	MF	Elías Legendre	22 April 2008 (aged 16)	(French Football Federation) Rennes
10	MF	Justin Lerma	5 May 2008 (aged 16)	(Ecuadorian Football Federation) Independiente del Valle
11	MF	Edwin Quintero	15 August 2009 (aged 15)	(Ecuadorian Football Federation) Independiente del Valle
12	GK	Mijaíl Vaca	16 November 2009 (aged 15)	(Ecuadorian Football Federation) El Nacional
13	DF	Adrián Cuadrado	10 March 2009 (aged 16)	(Royal Spanish Football Federation) Barcelona
14	MF	Jordan Mejía	1 September 2008 (aged 16)	(Royal Spanish Football Federation) Elche
15	MF	Diego Monzón	4 February 2008 (aged 17)	(Royal Spanish Football Federation) Real Zaragoza
16	MF	Yaxi García	30 May 2008 (aged 16)	(Ecuadorian Football Federation) Barcelona SC
17	FW	Juan Sánchez	24 June 2008 (aged 16)	(Ecuadorian Football Federation) Orense
18	MF	Jhosué Minda	29 September 2008 (aged 16)	(Ecuadorian Football Federation) LDU Quito
19	FW	Juan Riquelme Angulo	12 January 2008 (aged 17)	(Ecuadorian Football Federation) Independiente del Valle
20	FW	Malcom Dacosta	17 April 2008 (aged 16)	(The Football Association) Bournemouth
21	FW	Randy Preciado	3 January 2008 (aged 17)	(Ecuadorian Football Federation) Manta
22	GK	Gaikler Angulo	28 June 2010 (aged 14)	(Ecuadorian Football Federation) Independiente del Valle
23	FW	Leao Tenorio	23 August 2008 (aged 16)	(Ecuadorian Football Federation) Delfín

=== Venezuela ===
Venezuela announced their squad of 23 players on 27 March 2025.

Head coach: Oswaldo Vizcarrondo

No.	Pos.	Player	Date of birth (age)	Club
1	GK	Alan Vásquez	10 May 2008 (aged 16)	(Venezuelan Football Federation) Metropolitanos
2	DF	Ricardo Rincones	10 November 2008 (aged 16)	(Venezuelan Football Federation) Monagas
3	DF	Eider Barrios	25 November 2008 (aged 16)	(Venezuelan Football Federation) Caracas
4	DF	Marcos Aurelio Maitán	18 April 2008 (aged 16)	(Venezuelan Football Federation) Monagas
5	MF	Román Lozada	31 January 2009 (aged 16)	(Argentine Football Association) Vélez Sarsfield
6	MF	Willander Muñoz	11 April 2008 (aged 16)	(Venezuelan Football Federation) Universidad Central
7	DF	Juan Boyer	30 July 2008 (aged 16)	(Venezuelan Football Federation) Monagas
8	MF	Henrry Díaz	3 March 2008 (aged 17)	(Venezuelan Football Federation) Monagas
9	FW	David García	15 April 2008 (aged 16)	(United States Soccer Federation) Houston Dynamo 2
10	MF	Yerwin Sulbarán	3 March 2008 (aged 17)	(Venezuelan Football Federation) Monagas
11	FW	Yimvert Berroterán	4 May 2008 (aged 16)	(Venezuelan Football Federation) Universidad Central
12	GK	Ángel Pérez	27 May 2008 (aged 16)	(Venezuelan Football Federation) Academia Puerto Cabello
13	DF	Dioner Fuentes	5 June 2008 (aged 16)	(Venezuelan Football Federation) Atlético La Cruz
14	MF	Ender Albarrán	23 April 2008 (aged 16)	(Venezuelan Football Federation) Estudiantes de Mérida
15	MF	John Mancilla	19 November 2008 (aged 16)	(Venezuelan Football Federation) Monagas
16	FW	Juan Camilo Uribe	18 April 2008 (aged 16)	(Venezuelan Football Federation) Caracas
17	FW	Helzon Pomozy	18 December 2008 (aged 16)	(Venezuelan Football Federation) Zamora
18	DF	Román Davis	8 January 2008 (aged 17)	(Venezuelan Football Federation) Universidad Central
19	FW	Diego Ladino	28 March 2008 (aged 16)	(Venezuelan Football Federation) Caracas
20	MF	Luigi Pagano	9 July 2008 (aged 16)	(Venezuelan Football Federation) Rayo Zuliano
21	FW	Diego Claut	3 January 2008 (aged 17)	(Venezuelan Football Federation) Deportivo Miranda
22	DF	Luis Karbowski	16 October 2008 (aged 16)	(Venezuelan Football Federation) Academia Puerto Cabello
23	GK	Andrés Lugo	30 September 2008 (aged 16)	(Venezuelan Football Federation) Caracas

=== Uruguay ===
Uruguay announced their squad of 23 players on 20 March 2025.

Head coach: Matías Alonso

No.	Pos.	Player	Date of birth (age)	Club
1	GK	Fabián Cristaldo	15 February 2008 (aged 17)	(Uruguayan Football Association) Defensor Sporting
2	DF	Thiago Luthar	26 March 2008 (aged 17)	(Uruguayan Football Association) Peñarol
3	DF	Ignacio Fernández	11 December 2008 (aged 16)	(Uruguayan Football Association) Nacional
4	DF	Brian Barboza	14 May 2008 (aged 16)	(Uruguayan Football Association) Peñarol
5	MF	Julio Daguer	22 February 2008 (aged 17)	(Uruguayan Football Association) Peñarol
6	DF	Santiago Sosa	30 July 2008 (aged 16)	(Uruguayan Football Association) Danubio
7	FW	Kevin Rodrigo Martínez	22 March 2008 (aged 17)	(Uruguayan Football Association) Nacional
8	FW	Luciano González	7 March 2008 (aged 17)	(Uruguayan Football Association) Nacional
9	FW	Nicolás Azambuja	28 March 2008 (aged 16)	(Uruguayan Football Association) Danubio
10	MF	Agustín dos Santos	9 February 2008 (aged 17)	(Uruguayan Football Association) Nacional
11	FW	Alan Torterolo	3 January 2008 (aged 17)	(Uruguayan Football Association) Defensor Sporting
12	GK	Paulo da Costa	13 June 2008 (aged 16)	(Uruguayan Football Association) Peñarol
13	MF	Federico Bais	29 January 2008 (aged 17)	(Uruguayan Football Association) Nacional
14	DF	Facundo Balatti	9 June 2008 (aged 16)	(Uruguayan Football Association) Danubio
15	FW	Facundo Martínez	4 February 2008 (aged 17)	(Uruguayan Football Association) Montevideo City Torque
16	DF	Lautaro Silveira	22 October 2008 (aged 16)	(Uruguayan Football Association) Montevideo City Torque
17	FW	Renzo Cupla	7 June 2008 (aged 16)	(Uruguayan Football Association) Peñarol
18	MF	Thiago Roldán	10 January 2008 (aged 17)	(Uruguayan Football Association) Defensor Sporting
19	MF	Pablo Alcoba	10 November 2008 (aged 16)	(Uruguayan Football Association) Albion
20	MF	Gonzalo Pan	12 March 2008 (aged 17)	(Uruguayan Football Association) Defensor Sporting
21	DF	Francisco Sorondo	14 August 2008 (aged 16)	(Uruguayan Football Association) Defensor Sporting
22	FW	Francisco Fernández	22 August 2008 (aged 16)	(Uruguayan Football Association) Peñarol
23	GK	Lucas Jorge	14 August 2008 (aged 16)	(Uruguayan Football Association) Boston River

=== Bolivia ===
Following is the Bolivia squad of 23 players:

Head coach: (Argentina) Jorge Perrotta

No.	Pos.	Player	Date of birth (age)	Club
1	GK	Adrien Philippin	15 January 2009 (aged 16)	(Swiss Football Association) Servette
2	DF	Ian Rodríguez	22 January 2009 (aged 16)	(Bolivian Football Federation) Jorge Wilstermann
3	DF	Fernando Mena	22 September 2008 (aged 16)	(Bolivian Football Federation) Bolívar
4	DF	Julio Lazarte	19 April 2008 (aged 16)	(Bolivian Football Federation) Universitario de Vinto
5	DF	Matías Espinoza	25 June 2008 (aged 16)	(Bolivian Football Federation) Bolívar
6	MF	Thiago Castedo	14 May 2008 (aged 16)	(Bolivian Football Federation) Bolívar
7	FW	Alejandro Camacho	24 July 2008 (aged 16)	(Bolivian Football Federation) Always Ready
8	MF	Luis Sabja	9 February 2008 (aged 17)	(Bolivian Football Federation) Bolívar
9	FW	Diego Pérez	20 April 2008 (aged 16)	(Brazilian Football Confederation) Atlético Mineiro
10	MF	Jesús Maraude	2 February 2008 (aged 17)	(Bolivian Football Federation) Always Ready
11	MF	Santos García	22 April 2008 (aged 16)	(Bolivian Football Federation) Bolívar
12	GK	Carlos Borda	11 March 2009 (aged 16)	(Argentine Football Association) Atlético Tucumán
13	DF	Santiago Somoya	30 March 2009 (aged 15)	(Argentine Football Association) Argentinos Juniors
14	DF	Ray Peña	5 July 2008 (aged 16)	(Argentine Football Association) Racing
15	MF	Kenyhiro Estrada	24 October 2008 (aged 16)	Unattached
16	MF	Héctor Galvis	29 May 2008 (aged 16)	(Bolivian Football Federation) Academia Tahuichi Aguilera
17	FW	Brayan Barrios	1 November 2008 (aged 16)	Unattached
18	FW	Cristopher Nova	29 April 2008 (aged 16)	(Argentine Football Association) Temperley
19	FW	Nabil Nacif	19 September 2009 (aged 15)	(Bolivian Football Federation) JMP Soccer School
20	MF	Denis Quichu	17 March 2008 (aged 17)	(Argentine Football Association) Godoy Cruz
21	DF	Tobías Zurita	18 October 2008 (aged 16)	(Argentine Football Association) Platense
22	DF	Andy Ortuño	22 May 2008 (aged 16)	(Bolivian Football Federation) Bolívar
23	GK	Ronald Taborga	31 January 2009 (aged 16)	(Bolivian Football Federation) Bolívar
