= 2025 South American U-17 Championship =

CONMEBOL Sub 17 Colombia 2025

Tournament details
- Host country: Colombia
- Dates: 27 March – 12 April
- Teams: 10 (from 1 confederation)
- Venue: 2 (in 2 host cities)

Final positions
- Champions: Brazil (14th title)
- Runners-up: Colombia
- Third place: Venezuela
- Fourth place: Chile

Tournament statistics
- Matches played: 28
- Goals scored: 77 (2.75 per match)
- Top scorer: (Argentina) Thomás de Martis (6 goals)

The 2025 South American U-17 Championship was the 20th edition of the South American U-17 Championship (Spanish: CONMEBOL Sudamericano Sub-17, Portuguese: CONMEBOL Sul-Americano Sub-17), the biennial international youth football championship organised by CONMEBOL for the men's under-17 national teams of South America. It was held in Colombia from 27 March to 12 April 2025.

The tournament was originally scheduled to be held in Venezuela between 4–20 April 2024, before CONMEBOL decided to move it to Colombia due to Venezuela becoming the host of the 2025 South American U-20 Championship. Starting from this edition, the tournament will be played every year in line with the annual cycle implemented by FIFA for the FIFA U-17 World Cup.

As a result of the expansion of the FIFA U-17 World Cup format, seven teams qualified for the U-17 World Cup from this edition onwards, an increase of three berths from the four CONMEBOL teams that previously qualified. The top 7 teams qualified for the 2025 FIFA U-17 World Cup in Qatar as the CONMEBOL representatives.

Defending champions Brazil successfully retained their title, defeating the hosts Colombia 4–1 on penalties following a 1–1 draw in the final, which earned them their fourteenth South American U-17 Championship title, the most in the tournament’s history. These two teams and the next five best-placed teams — Venezuela, Chile, Paraguay, Argentina and Bolivia — qualified for the 2025 FIFA U-17 World Cup.

== Format changes ==
After three years of evaluation and analysis of the proposal submitted in 2021, FIFA announced on 14 March 2024 that its U-17 World Cup would be expanded to 48 teams and would be held annually from 2025, with Qatar being awarded the hosting rights for the next five tournaments. Consequently, CONMEBOL had to modify the format of the South American U-17 Championship to define the 7 places it was awarded in the new slot allocation of the U-17 World Cup. The new format of the South American U-17 Championship is as follows:

- The group stage remains unchanged, with the ten teams being divided into two groups of five teams each. Both groups are played on a single round-robin basis.
- The top two teams of each group advance to the semi-finals and qualify for the 2025 FIFA U-17 World Cup. Winners of semi-finals advance to the final to determine the champions while losers play the third place match.
- Teams placed third and fourth in each group will play for the 5th to 8th places, with the third placed teams playing the fourth placed teams in two semi-finals. The winners of the semi-finals play for fifth place and qualify for the 2025 FIFA U-17 World Cup while the losers play for seventh place, with the winner being the last team to qualify for the 2025 FIFA U-17 World.
- Teams placed fifth in the group stage will be eliminated.

== Host and venues ==
Venezuela was originally announced as host country for the tournament by the CONMEBOL President Alejandro Domínguez during a CONMEBOL Council meeting held on 10 April 2024.

However, on 15 November 2024, CONMEBOL announced some changes to its competition calendar for 2025 in a letter sent to its member associations, moving the South American U-17 Championship to Colombia to replace Venezuela, which went on to host the 2025 South American U-20 Championship after CONMEBOL withdrew Peru's hosting rights of this tournament.

CONMEBOL announced Montería and Cartagena as host cities on 6 February 2025, with the Estadio Jaraguay and the Estadio Jaime Morón León being the venues for the matches.

Montería	Location of the host cities.	Cartagena
Estadio Jaraguay	Location of the host cities.	Estadio Jaime Morón León
Capacity: 12,000	Location of the host cities.	Capacity: 17,500

== Teams ==
All ten CONMEBOL member national teams entered the tournament.

Team	Appearance	Previous best performance
Argentina	20th	Champions (4 times, most recent 2019)
Bolivia	20th	Champions (1 time, 1986)
Brazil (holders)	20th	Champions (13 times, most recent 2023)
Chile	20th	Runners-up (3 times, most recent 2019)
Colombia (hosts)	20th	Champions (1 time, 1993)
Ecuador	19th	Runners-up (1 time, 2023)
Paraguay	19th	Runners-up (1 time, 1999)
Peru	20th	Fourth place (1 time, 2007)
Uruguay	20th	Runners-up (3 times, most recent 2011)
Venezuela	20th	Runners-up (1 time, 2013)

=== Squads ===
Each team registered a squad of a minimum of 19 and a maximum of 23 players, including at least 3 goalkeepers. Players born between 1 January 2008 and 31 December 2010 (ages 15 to 17) were eligible to compete in the tournament (Regulations Articles 47 and 50).

== Draw ==
The draw of the tournament was held on 19 December 2024, 14:15 PYT (UTC−3), at the CONMEBOL headquarters in Luque, Paraguay. The ten teams were drawn into two groups of five. The hosts Colombia and defending champions Brazil were seeded into Group A and Group B respectively and assigned to position 1 in their group, while the remaining teams were placed into four "pairing pots" according to their results in the 2023 South American U-17 Championship (shown in brackets).

Seeded	Pot 1	Pot 2	Pot 3	Pot 4
Colombia (9) (Hosts, assigned to A1); Brazil (1) (Title holders, assigned to B1)	Ecuador (2); Argentina (3)	Venezuela (4); Paraguay (5)	Chile (6); Uruguay (7)	Bolivia (8); Peru (10)

From each pot, the first team drawn was placed into Group A and the second team drawn was placed into Group B. In both groups, teams from pot 1 were allocated in position 2, teams from pot 2 in position 3, teams from pot 3 in position 4 and teams from pot 4 in position 5.

The draw resulted in the following groups:

Group A
Pos	Team
A1	Colombia
A2	Argentina
A3	Paraguay
A4	Chile
A5	Peru

Group B
Pos	Team
B1	Brazil
B2	Ecuador
B3	Venezuela
B4	Uruguay
B5	Bolivia

== Group stage ==
The top two teams in each group advanced to the final four.

Tiebreakers

In the group stage, teams were ranked according to points earned (3 points for a win, 1 point for a draw, 0 points for a loss). If tied on points, tiebreakers would be applied in the following order (Regulations Article 20):

1. Head-to-head result between tied teams;
  - Points in head-to-head matches among the tied teams;
  - Goal difference in head-to-head matches among the tied teams;
  - Goals scored in head-to-head matches among the tied teams;
2. Goal difference in all group matches;
3. Goals scored in all group matches;
4. Fewest red cards received;
5. Fewest yellow cards received;
6. Drawing of lots.

All match times are local times, COT (UTC−5), as listed by CONMEBOL.

=== Group A ===
Pos	Team	Pld	W	D	L	GF	GA	GD	Pts	Qualification
1	Colombia (H)	4	3	0	1	5	2	+3	9 (Note: Head-to-head result: Colombia 1–0 Chile.)	Final four and 2025 FIFA U-17 World Cup
2	Chile	4	3	0	1	9	3	+6	9	Final four and 2025 FIFA U-17 World Cup
3	Argentina	4	2	0	2	12	6	+6	6 (Note: Head-to-head result: Argentina 4–1 Paraguay.)	5th–8th places
4	Paraguay	4	2	0	2	7	5	+2	6	5th–8th places
5	Peru	4	0	0	4	0	17	−17	0	

Source: CONMEBOL
Rules for classification: Tiebreakers
(H) Hosts
Notes:
27 March 2025
16:30

Peru	0–5	Paraguay
	Report	De Carvalho 10'; Zayas 19'; Villalba 43', 48'; Campss 86'

Estadio Jaraguay, Montería
Referee: Anthony Díaz (Ecuador)
27 March 2025
19:00

Colombia	1–0	Chile
Londoño 75'	Report

Estadio Jaraguay, Montería
Referee: Rony Cueva (Venezuela)

29 March 2025
16:30

Chile	3–2	Argentina
Sepúlveda 56'; Yáñez 70'; Jiménez 81'	Report	De Martis 45', 90+6'

Estadio Jaraguay, Montería
Referee: Hernán Heras (Uruguay)
29 March 2025
19:00

Peru	0–2	Colombia
	Report	Trujillo 86'; Flórez 90+5'

Estadio Jaraguay, Montería
Referee: Gabriel Mendoza (Bolivia)

31 March 2025
16:30

Chile	5–0	Peru
Cuevas 17' (pen.), 70'; Orellana 24'; Olguín 43', 65'	Report

Estadio Jaraguay, Montería
Referee: Matheus Candançan (Brazil)
31 March 2025
19:00

Argentina	4–1	Paraguay
Ojeda 24'; Meza 37'; Espíndola 81'; Verón 82'	Report	Buhring 90+6'

Estadio Jaraguay, Montería
Referee: Rony Cueva (Venezuela)

2 April 2025
16:30

Argentina	5–0	Peru
Ojeda 8'; Castillo 41' (o.g.); Piñeyro 52', 86'; De Martis 78'	Report

Estadio Jaraguay, Montería
Referee: Gabriel Mendoza (Bolivia)
2 April 2025
19:00

Paraguay	1–0	Colombia
Coronel 69'	Report

Estadio Jaraguay, Montería
Referee: Anthony Díaz (Ecuador)

5 April 2025
19:00

Colombia	2–1	Argentina
Macías 10'; Londoño 16'	Report	De Martis 77' (pen.)

Estadio Jaime Morón León, Cartagena
Referee: Matheus Candançan (Brazil)
5 April 2025
19:00

Paraguay	0–1	Chile
	Report	Olguín 90+11' (pen.)

Estadio Jaraguay, Montería
Referee: Hernán Heras (Uruguay)

=== Group B ===
Pos	Team	Pld	W	D	L	GF	GA	GD	Pts	Qualification
1	Brazil	4	3	1	0	8	3	+5	10	Final four and 2025 FIFA U-17 World Cup
2	Venezuela	4	2	1	1	5	3	+2	7	Final four and 2025 FIFA U-17 World Cup
3	Ecuador	4	2	0	2	8	5	+3	6	5th–8th places
4	Bolivia	4	1	0	3	2	7	−5	3	5th–8th places
5	Uruguay	4	0	2	2	3	8	−5	2	

Source: CONMEBOL
Rules for classification: Tiebreakers
28 March 2025
16:30

Bolivia	0–2	Venezuela
	Report	Claut 27'; Berroterán 77'

Estadio Jaime Morón León, Cartagena
Referee: Diego Ulloa (Colombia)
28 March 2025
19:00

Brazil	1–1	Uruguay
Ruan Pablo 50'	Report	Azambuja 45+2'

Estadio Jaime Morón León, Cartagena
Referee: Sebastián Martínez (Argentina)

30 March 2025
16:30

Bolivia	0–3	Brazil
	Report	Ruan Pablo 7', 62'; Kayke 81'

Estadio Jaime Morón León, Cartagena
Referee: Jordi Espinoza (Peru)
30 March 2025
19:00

Uruguay	0–4	Ecuador
	Report	Legendre 1'; Angulo 37'; Lerma 43', 45+3'

Estadio Jaime Morón León, Cartagena
Referee: David Ojeda (Paraguay)

1 April 2025
16:30

Uruguay	0–1	Bolivia
	Report	Maraude 43'

Estadio Jaime Morón León, Cartagena
Referee: Diego Flores (Chile)
1 April 2025
19:00

Ecuador	0–1	Venezuela
	Report	Claut 51'

Estadio Jaime Morón León, Cartagena
Referee: Sebastián Martínez (Argentina)

3 April 2025
16:30

Ecuador	2–1	Bolivia
Quintero 33', 50'	Report	Pérez 84' (pen.)

Estadio Jaime Morón León, Cartagena
Referee: Jordi Espinoza (Peru)
3 April 2025
19:00

Venezuela	0–1	Brazil
	Report	Luis Eduardo 88'

Estadio Jaime Morón León, Cartagena
Referee: David Ojeda (Paraguay)

5 April 2025
16:30

Brazil	3–2	Ecuador
Luis Eduardo 55'; Gustavo 57'; Luis Gustavo 89'	Report	Luis Eduardo 45+1' (o.g.); Lerma 52' (pen.)

Estadio Jaime Morón León, Cartagena
Referee: Sebastián Martínez (Argentina)
5 April 2025
16:30

Venezuela	2–2	Uruguay
Claut 43'; Uribe 90+5'	Report	Dos Santos 10'; F. Fernández 75'

Estadio Jaraguay, Montería
Referee: Diego Ulloa (Colombia)

== Final stage ==
The final stage was played on a single-elimination basis and consisted of the 5th–8th play-offs matches, semi-finals, third place match and final. If a match was level at the end of normal playing time, the winner would be decided directly by a penalty shoot-out (no extra time will be played).

All match times are local times, COT (UTC−5), as listed by CONMEBOL.

=== 5th–8th places ===
The 5th–8th semi-finals matchups were:

- Group A third place vs Group B fourth place
- Group B third place vs Group A fourth place

5th–8th semi-finals
8 April – Montería
Argentina	3
Bolivia	0
8 April – Montería
Ecuador	0 (4)
Paraguay (p)	0 (5)

Fifth place
11 April – Montería
Argentina	1 (3)
Paraguay (p)	1 (4)
Seventh place
11 April – Montería
Bolivia	1
Ecuador	0

==== 5th–8th semi-finals ====
Winners qualified for the 2025 FIFA U-17 World Cup.

8 April 2025
16:00

Ecuador	0–0	Paraguay
	Report
Penalties
Ortiz (penalty scored); Legendre (penalty scored); Dacosta (penalty scored); Lerma (penalty missed); Caicedo (penalty scored)	4–5	(penalty scored) Zayas; (penalty scored) Ledesma; (penalty scored) Franco; (penalty scored) Buhring; (penalty scored) Coronel

Estadio Jaraguay, Montería
Referee: Diego Ulloa (Colombia)

8 April 2025
19:00

Argentina	3–0	Bolivia
De Martis 44', 58'; Parmo 90'	Report

Estadio Jaraguay, Montería
Referee: Rony Cueva (Venezuela)

==== Seventh place match ====
Winner qualified for the 2025 FIFA U-17 World Cup.

11 April 2025
16:00

Bolivia	1–0	Ecuador
García 52'	Report

Estadio Jaraguay, Montería
Referee: Matheus Candançan (Brazil)

==== Fifth place match ====
11 April 2025
19:00

Argentina	1–1	Paraguay
González 90+5'	Report	Jara 14'
Penalties
Mattar (penalty scored); Parmo (penalty scored); Verón (penalty scored); Meza (penalty missed); De Martis (penalty missed)	3–4	(penalty scored) De Carvalho; (penalty missed) Zayas; (penalty scored) Ledesma; (penalty scored) Villalba; (penalty scored) Coronel

Estadio Jaraguay, Montería
Referee: Gabriel Mendoza (Bolivia)

=== Final four ===
The semi-finals matchups are:

- Semi-final 1 (SF1): Group A winners vs Group B runners-up
- Semi-final 2 (SF2): Group B winners vs Group A runners-up

Semi-finals
9 April – Cartagena
Colombia	5
Venezuela	1
9 April – Cartagena
Brazil	1
Chile	0

Final
12 April – Cartagena
Colombia	1 (1)
Brazil (p)	1 (4)
Third place
12 April – Cartagena
Venezuela	3
Chile	0

==== Semi-finals ====
9 April 2025
16:00

Brazil	1–0	Chile
Dell 65'	Report

Estadio Jaime Morón León, Cartagena
Referee: David Ojeda (Paraguay)

9 April 2025
19:00

Colombia	5–1	Venezuela
Londoño 16', 37', 55' (pen.); Flórez 82'; Urrutia 87'	Report	Claut 34'

Estadio Jaime Morón León, Cartagena
Referee: Jordi Espinoza (Peru)

==== Third place match ====
12 April 2025
16:00

Venezuela	3–0	Chile
Berroterán 51'; Boyer 64'; Maitán 68'	Report

Estadio Jaime Morón León, Cartagena
Referee: Anthony Díaz (Ecuador)

==== Final ====
12 April 2025
19:00

Colombia	1–1	Brazil
Sevillano 41'	Report	Angelo 88'
Penalties
Rivas (penalty missed); Orozco (penalty scored); Cataño (penalty missed)	1–4	(penalty scored) Gustavo; (penalty scored) Tiago; (penalty scored) Ruan Pablo; (penalty scored) Dell

Estadio Jaime Morón León, Cartagena
Referee: Hernán Heras (Uruguay)

== Goalscorers ==
There were 77 goals scored in 28 matches, for an average of 2.75 goals per match.

6 goals

- (Argentina) Thomás de Martis

5 goals

- (Colombia) Santiago Londoño

4 goals

- (Venezuela) Diego Claut

3 goals

- (Brazil) Ruan Pablo
- (Chile) Alonso Olguín
- (Ecuador) Justin Lerma

2 goals

- (Argentina) Uriel Ojeda
- (Argentina) Joaquín Piñeyro
- (Brazil) Luis Eduardo
- (Chile) Yastin Cuevas
- (Colombia) Cristian Flórez
- (Ecuador) Edwin Quintero
- (Paraguay) Pedro Villalba
- (Venezuela) Yimvert Berroterán

1 goal

- (Argentina) Santiago Espíndola
- (Argentina) Bautista González
- (Argentina) Juan Cruz Meza
- (Argentina) Tomás Parmo
- (Argentina) Alex Verón
- (Bolivia) Santos García
- (Bolivia) Jesús Maraude
- (Bolivia) Diego Pérez
- (Brazil) Angelo
- (Brazil) Dell
- (Brazil) Gustavo
- (Brazil) Kayke
- (Brazil) Luis Gustavo
- (Chile) Martín Jiménez
- (Chile) Matías Orellana
- (Chile) Cristóbal Sepúlveda
- (Chile) Zidane Yáñez
- (Colombia) Criss Macías
- (Colombia) Jhon Sevillano
- (Colombia) Ashley Trujillo
- (Colombia) Yeminson Urrutia
- (Ecuador) Juan Riquelme Angulo
- (Ecuador) Elías Legendre
- (Paraguay) José Buhring
- (Paraguay) Jhosías Campss
- (Paraguay) Mauro Coronel
- (Paraguay) Mauricio De Carvalho
- (Paraguay) Tobías Jara
- (Paraguay) Fernando Zayas
- (Uruguay) Nicolás Azambuja
- (Uruguay) Agustín Dos Santos
- (Uruguay) Francisco Fernández
- (Venezuela) Juan Boyer
- (Venezuela) Marcos Maitán
- (Venezuela) Juan Camilo Uribe

1 own goal

- (Brazil) Luis Eduardo (against Ecuador)
- (Peru) Gerson Castillo (against Argentina)

== Qualified teams for FIFA U-17 World Cup ==
The following seven teams from CONMEBOL qualified for the 2025 FIFA U-17 World Cup in Qatar.

Team	Qualified on	Previous appearances in FIFA U-17 World Cup^{1}
Brazil	5 April 2025	18 (1985, 1987, 1989, 1991, 1995, **1997**, **1999**, 2001, **2003**, 2005, 2007, 2009, 2011, 2013, 2015, 2017, **2019**, 2023)
Venezuela	5 April 2025	2 (2013, 2023)
Colombia	5 April 2025	6 (1989, 1993, 2003, 2007, 2009, 2017)
Chile	5 April 2025	5 (1993, 1997, 2015, 2017, 2019)
Paraguay	8 April 2025	5 (1999, 2001, 2015, 2017, 2019)
Argentina	8 April 2025	15 (1985, 1989, 1991, 1993, 1995, 1997, 2001, 2003, 2007, 2009, 2011, 2013, 2015, 2019, 2023)
Bolivia	11 April 2025	2 (1985, 1987)

^{1} Bold indicates champions for that year. Italic indicates hosts for that year.
