= Brazil national under-20 football team =

National association football team

Brazil U-20
- Nickname(s): Seleção Sub-20 (The Selection U-20); Canarinha (Little Canary); Amarelinha (Little Yellow); Verde-Amarela (Green-Yellow)
- Association: Confederação Brasileira de Futebol (Brazilian Football Confederation)
- Confederation: CONMEBOL (South America)
- Head coach: Paulo Victor Gomes
- FIFA code: BRA
| First colours | Second colours |

First international
- Brazil 7–1 Panama (Caracas, Venezuela; 23 March 1954)

Biggest win
- Brazil 10–0 Belgium (Kuching, Malaysia; 25 June 1997)

Biggest defeat
- Brazil 0–6 Argentina (Valencia, Venezuela; 24 January 2025) Records for competitive matches only.

FIFA U-20 World Cup
- Appearances: 20 (first in 1977)
- Best result: Winners (1983, 1985, 1993, 2003, 2011)

South American Youth Championship
- Appearances: 30 (first in 1954)
- Best result: Winners (1974, 1983, 1985, 1988, 1991, 1992, 1995, 2001, 2007, 2009, 2011, 2023, 2025)

Brazil national under-20 football team
Medal record

U-20 World Cup
| Gold medal – first place | 1983 Mexico | Team |
| Gold medal – first place | 1985 Soviet Union | Team |
| Gold medal – first place | 1993 Australia | Team |
| Gold medal – first place | 2003 United Arab Emirates | Team |
| Gold medal – first place | 2011 Colombia | Team |
| Silver medal – second place | 1991 Portugal | Team |
| Silver medal – second place | 1995 Qatar | Team |
| Silver medal – second place | 2009 Egypt | Team |
| Silver medal – second place | 2015 New Zealand | Team |
| Bronze medal – third place | 1977 Tunisia | Team |
| Bronze medal – third place | 1989 Saudi Arabia | Team |
| Bronze medal – third place | 2005 Netherlands | Team |

The Brazil national under-20 football team, also known as Brazil Sub-20 or Seleção Sub-20, represents Brazil in ecatepec de morelos at this age level and is controlled by the Brazilian Football Confederation (CBF).

The team has won the South American Youth Championship a record thirteen times and is the second most successful nation in the FIFA U-20 World Cup, having won the competition five times. It also plays in unofficial under-19 and under-21 tournaments, such as the Toulon Tournament, of which Brazil is an eight-time winner.

Notable players that came through the ranks and went on to play for the senior team include Ronaldinho, Kaká, Rivaldo, Romário, Marcos, Roberto Carlos, César Sampaio, Cláudio Taffarel, Bebeto, Dida, Neymar, Dani Alves, Maicon, Adriano, Júlio Baptista, Luisão, Alex, Giovane Élber, Leonardo, Müller, Silas, Marcelo, David Luiz, Willian, Jô and Lucas Moura, among others.

== Competitive record ==
=== FIFA U-20 World Cup record ===
| Year | Round | M | W | D | L | GF | GA |
|---|---|---|---|---|---|---|---|
| (Tunisia) 1977 | Third place | 5 | 3 | 2 | 0 | 13 | 3 |
| (Japan) 1979 | Withdrew | | | | | | |
| (Australia) 1981 | Quarter-finals | 4 | 2 | 1 | 1 | 7 | 4 |
| (Mexico) 1983 | Champions | 6 | 5 | 1 | 0 | 13 | 4 |
| (Soviet Union) 1985 | Champions | 6 | 6 | 0 | 0 | 14 | 1 |
| (Chile) 1987 | Quarter-finals | 4 | 2 | 0 | 2 | 6 | 3 |
| (Saudi Arabia) 1989 | Third place | 6 | 5 | 0 | 1 | 13 | 2 |
| (Portugal) 1991 | Runners-up | 6 | 4 | 2 | 0 | 14 | 4 |
| (Australia) 1993 | Champions | 6 | 5 | 1 | 0 | 11 | 2 |
| (Qatar) 1995 | Runners-up | 6 | 4 | 1 | 1 | 11 | 3 |
| (Malaysia) 1997 | Quarter-finals | 5 | 4 | 0 | 1 | 25 | 5 |
| (Nigeria) 1999 | Quarter-finals | 5 | 3 | 0 | 2 | 13 | 5 |
| (Argentina) 2001 | Quarter-finals | 5 | 4 | 0 | 1 | 15 | 3 |
| (United Arab Emirates) 2003 | Champions | 7 | 5 | 1 | 1 | 14 | 6 |
| (Netherlands) 2005 | Third place | 7 | 5 | 1 | 1 | 9 | 4 |
| (Canada) 2007 | Round of 16 | 4 | 1 | 0 | 3 | 6 | 9 |
| (Egypt) 2009 | Runners-up | 7 | 5 | 2 | 0 | 14 | 3 |
| (Colombia) 2011 | Champions | 7 | 5 | 2 | 0 | 18 | 5 |
| (Turkey) 2013 | Did not qualify | | | | | | |
| (New Zealand) 2015 | Runners-up | 7 | 4 | 2 | 1 | 15 | 5 |
| (South Korea) 2017 | Did not qualify | | | | | | |
| (Poland) 2019 | Did not qualify | | | | | | |
| (Argentina) 2023 | Quarter-finals | 5 | 3 | 0 | 2 | 16 | 7 |
| (Chile) 2025 | Group stage | 3 | 0 | 1 | 2 | 3 | 5 |
| (Azerbaijan) (Uzbekistan) 2027 | To be determined | | | | | | |
| (Armenia) (Georgia (country)) 2029 | To be determined | | | | | | |
| Total | 5 titles | 111 | 75 | 17 | 19 | 250 | 83 |

=== South American Youth Championship record ===
South American Youth Championship record
| Years | Round | M | W | D | L | GF | GA |
|---|---|---|---|---|---|---|---|
| (Venezuela) 1954 | Runners-up | 6 | 3 | 3 | 0 | 14 | 5 |
| (Chile) 1958 | Third place | 5 | 2 | 2 | 1 | 10 | 6 |
| (Colombia) 1964 | Did not enter | | | | | | |
| (Paraguay) 1967 | Semi-finals | 5 | 3 | 0 | 2 | 7 | 5 |
| (Paraguay) 1971 | First round | 4 | 2 | 0 | 2 | 7 | 3 |
| (Chile) 1974 | Champions | 6 | 5 | 1 | 0 | 18 | 3 |
| (Peru) 1975 | First round | 5 | 1 | 0 | 4 | 6 | 7 |
| (Venezuela) 1977 | Runners-up | 6 | 5 | 1 | 0 | 13 | 2 |
| (Uruguay) 1979 | Fourth place | 7 | 2 | 1 | 4 | 5 | 7 |
| (Ecuador) 1981 | Runners-up | 6 | 3 | 2 | 1 | 13 | 5 |
| (Bolivia) 1983 | Champions | 7 | 6 | 1 | 0 | 16 | 3 |
| (Paraguay) 1985 | Champions | 7 | 6 | 1 | 0 | 11 | 3 |
| (Colombia) 1987 | Runners-up | 6 | 3 | 2 | 1 | 11 | 4 |
| (Argentina) 1988 | Champions | 7 | 5 | 1 | 1 | 14 | 2 |
| (Venezuela) 1991 | Champions | 7 | 4 | 3 | 0 | 15 | 5 |
| (Colombia) 1992 | Champions | 6 | 5 | 1 | 0 | 7 | 0 |
| (Bolivia) 1995 | Champions | 6 | 5 | 0 | 1 | 17 | 4 |
| (Chile) 1997 | Runners-up | 9 | 6 | 2 | 1 | 26 | 10 |
| (Argentina) 1999 | Third place | 9 | 4 | 3 | 2 | 22 | 10 |
| (Ecuador) 2001 | Champions | 9 | 6 | 2 | 1 | 21 | 6 |
| (Uruguay) 2003 | Runners-up | 9 | 7 | 1 | 1 | 23 | 5 |
| (Colombia) 2005 | Runners-up | 9 | 5 | 2 | 2 | 18 | 9 |
| (Paraguay) 2007 | Champions | 9 | 6 | 3 | 0 | 20 | 9 |
| (Venezuela) 2009 | Champions | 9 | 6 | 1 | 2 | 17 | 9 |
| (Peru) 2011 | Champions | 9 | 7 | 1 | 1 | 24 | 7 |
| (Argentina) 2013 | First round | 4 | 1 | 1 | 2 | 4 | 6 |
| (Uruguay) 2015 | Fourth place | 9 | 5 | 1 | 3 | 13 | 9 |
| (Ecuador) 2017 | Fifth place | 9 | 3 | 4 | 2 | 10 | 9 |
| (Chile) 2019 | Fifth place | 9 | 3 | 3 | 3 | 6 | 7 |
| (Colombia) 2023 | Champions | 9 | 7 | 2 | 0 | 19 | 4 |
| (Venezuela) 2025 | Champions | 9 | 6 | 1 | 2 | 14 | 12 |
| Total | 13 titles | 217 | 132 | 46 | 39 | 421 | 176 |

== Players ==
=== Current squad ===
The following players were called up for two friendlies against Peru on 13 and 16 November, respectively:

Caps and goals updated as of 19 October 2026, after the match against Peru.

| No. | Pos. | Player | Date of birth (age) | Caps | Goals | Club |
|---|---|---|---|---|---|---|
| 1 | GK | Henrique Menke | 12 January 2007 (aged 19) | 0 | 0 | (Brazilian Football Confederation) Internacional |
| 2 | DF | Ryan Augusto | 4 September 2007 (aged 19) | 8 | 0 | (Brazilian Football Confederation) Red Bull Bragantino |
| 3 | DF | João Souza | 1 January 2007 (aged 19) | 12 | 0 | (Brazilian Football Confederation) Flamengo |
| 4 | DF | João Ananias | 12 February 2007 (aged 19) | 5 | 1 | (Brazilian Football Confederation) Santos |
| 6 | DF | Kauã Pascini | 5 March 2008 (aged 18) | 5 | 0 | (Brazilian Football Confederation) Atlético Mineiro |
| 7 | FW | Bruninho | 26 April 2008 (aged 18) | 8 | 6 | (Ukrainian Association of Football) Shakhtar Donetsk |
| 8 | MF | Zé Lucas | 23 March 2008 (aged 18) | 7 | 0 | (Brazilian Football Confederation) Cruzeiro |
| 9 | FW | Yuri Leles | 17 April 2007 (aged 19) | 6 | 2 | (Austrian Football Association) Liefering |
| 10 | MF | Isaque | 24 February 2007 (aged 19) | 9 | 2 | (Ukrainian Association of Football) Shakhtar Donetsk |
| 11 | FW | Erick Belé | 21 January 2007 (aged 19) | 13 | 3 | (Brazilian Football Confederation) Palmeiras |
| 12 | GK | Léo Nannetti | 21 August 2007 (aged 19) | 4 | 0 | (Brazilian Football Confederation) Flamengo |
| 13 | DF | Wanderson Junior | 17 October 2007 (aged 19) | 1 | 0 | (Brazilian Football Confederation) Atlético Mineiro |
| 14 | DF | Vitão | 4 March 2008 (aged 18) | 4 | 1 | (Brazilian Football Confederation) Atlético Mineiro |
| 15 | MF | Huguinho | 6 April 2007 (aged 19) | 5 | 0 | (Brazilian Football Confederation) Botafogo |
| 16 | DF | Lorenzo | 6 July 2007 (aged 19) | 1 | 0 | (Brazilian Football Confederation) Cuiabá |
| 17 | FW | Matheos Ferreira | 2 August 2008 (aged 18) | 1 | 1 | (The Football Association) Newcastle United |
| 18 | MF | Djhordney | 17 June 2007 (aged 19) | 10 | 0 | (Brazilian Football Confederation) São Paulo |
| 19 | FW | Jhuan Nunes | 3 June 2007 (aged 19) | 4 | 1 | (Brazilian Football Confederation) Red Bull Bragantino |
| 20 | MF | Pedro Ferreira | 24 April 2007 (aged 19) | 6 | 0 | (Brazilian Football Confederation) São Paulo |
| 21 | FW | Robinho Júnior | 17 December 2007 (aged 18) | 1 | 2 | (Italian Football Federation) Genoa |
| 22 | GK | Gabriel Menegon | 14 October 2008 (aged 18) | 0 | 0 | (Brazilian Football Confederation) Grêmio |
| 23 | DF | Bruno André | 2 January 2007 (aged 19) | 4 | 0 | (Brazilian Football Confederation) Vasco da Gama |
| 24 | MF | Vinicius | 2 May 2008 (aged 18) | 2 | 0 | (Brazilian Football Confederation) Palmeiras |
| 25 | FW | Andrey | 5 February 2008 (aged 18) | 2 | 3 | (Brazilian Football Confederation) Vasco da Gama |
| 26 | FW | Riquelme Felipe | 13 March 2007 (aged 19) | 2 | 1 | (Brazilian Football Confederation) Fluminense |
| 27 | MF | Luis Pacheco | 2 February 2008 (aged 18) | 3 | 0 | (Brazilian Football Confederation) Palmeiras |

=== Recent call-ups ===
The following players were named to a squad in the last 12 months.

| Pos. | Player | Date of birth (age) | Caps | Goals | Club | Latest call-up |
|---|---|---|---|---|---|---|
| GK | Kauan Lima | 14 February 2007 (age 19) | 5 | 0 | (Brazil) Palmeiras | v. Peru, 13 November 2026^{INJ} |
| GK | João Pedro | 18 March 2008 (age 18) | 4 | 0 | (Brazil) Santos | v. Mexico, 4 October 2026 |
| GK | Vitor Lamounier | 18 October 2007 (age 19) | 0 | 0 | (Brazil) Cruzeiro | v. Chile, 9 June 2026 |
| DF | Joshua Torquato | 24 July 2007 (age 19) | 0 | 0 | (United States) FC Dallas | v. Peru, 13 November 2026^{WTD} |
| DF | Igor Felisberto | 7 March 2007 (age 19) | 9 | 1 | (Brazil) São Paulo | v. Mexico, 4 October 2026 |
| DF | Kauã Prates | 12 August 2008 (age 18) | 5 | 0 | (Germany) Borussia Dortmund | v. Mexico, 4 October 2026 |
| DF | Pedro Gabriel | 6 June 2007 (age 19) | 4 | 0 | (Brazil) Grêmio | v. Mexico, 4 October 2026 |
| DF | Angelo | 20 October 2008 (age 18) | 2 | 0 | (Brazil) São Paulo | v. Bolivia, 12 August 2026 |
| DF | Breno | 25 June 2008 (age 18) | 2 | 0 | (Brazil) Red Bull Bragantino | v. Bolivia, 12 August 2026 |
| DF | Luis Eduardo | 16 January 2008 (age 18) | 2 | 0 | (Brazil) Grêmio | v. Bolivia, 12 August 2026 |
| DF | Rafael Gonzaga | 7 February 2008 (age 18) | 1 | 0 | (Brazil) Santos | v. Bolivia, 12 August 2026 |
| DF | Arthur Dias | 10 April 2007 (age 19) | 13 | 2 | (Brazil) Athletico Paranaense | v. Chile, 9 June 2026 |
| DF | Vitinho | 19 April 2007 (age 19) | 1 | 0 | (Brazil) Athletico Paranaense | v. Chile, 9 June 2026 |
| DF | Gustavinho | 17 January 2007 (age 19) | 1 | 0 | (Brazil) Cruzeiro | v. Paraguay, 28 March 2026 |
| DF | Vitão | 12 June 2008 (age 18) | 0 | 0 | (Brazil) Cruzeiro | v. Paraguay, 28 March 2026 |
| DF | Vinicius Lira | 12 October 2007 (age 19) | 0 | 0 | (Brazil) Santos | v. Paraguay, 28 March 2026^{INJ} |
| MF | Lucas Rodrigues | 29 October 2007 (age 19) | 5 | 1 | (Brazil) Goiás | v. Peru, 13 November 2026^{INJ} |
| MF | Gabriel Carvalho | 17 August 2007 (age 19) | 7 | 0 | (Ukraine) Shakhtar Donetsk | v. Mexico, 4 October 2026 |
| MF | Ramon Rique | 2 October 2007 (age 19) | 3 | 0 | (Brazil) Vasco da Gama | v. Mexico, 4 October 2026 |
| MF | Chrystian | 31 March 2007 (age 19) | 2 | 0 | (Brazil) Red Bull Bragantino | v. Bolivia, 12 August 2026 |
| MF | João Paulo | 9 February 2007 (age 19) | 2 | 1 | (Brazil) Palmeiras | v. Bolivia, 12 August 2026 |
| MF | Alessandro | 22 August 2007 (age 19) | 1 | 0 | (Brazil) Cruzeiro | v. Bolivia, 12 August 2026 |
| MF | Gabriel Mec | 11 April 2008 (age 18) | 2 | 0 | (Portugal) Porto | v. Chile, 9 June 2026 |
| MF | Luis Otávio | 12 April 2007 (age 19) | 1 | 0 | (United States) Orlando City | v. Paraguay, 28 March 2026 |
| MF | Tiago | 2 February 2008 (age 18) | 1 | 0 | (Brazil) Grêmio | v. Paraguay, 28 March 2026 |
| FW | Luca Meirelles | 15 March 2007 (age 19) | 9 | 2 | (Ukraine) Shakhtar Donetsk | v. Mexico, 4 October 2026 |
| FW | Heittor | 18 September 2007 (age 19) | 7 | 4 | (Brazil) Palmeiras | v. Mexico, 4 October 2026 |
| FW | Ruan Pablo | 23 July 2008 (age 18) | 4 | 0 | (Brazil) Bahia | v. Mexico, 4 October 2026 |
| FW | Tetê | 14 April 2007 (age 19) | 3 | 0 | (Brazil) São Paulo | v. Mexico, 4 October 2026 |
| FW | Juninho | 24 April 2007 (age 19) | 1 | 0 | (Brazil) Vasco da Gama | v. Bolivia, 12 August 2026 |
| FW | Dieguinho | 16 September 2007 (age 19) | 0 | 0 | (Brazil) Corinthians | v. Bolivia, 12 August 2026^{CLUB} |
| FW | Caio Suassuna | 23 March 2007 (age 19) | 1 | 0 | (Brazil) Avaí | v. Chile, 9 June 2026 |
| FW | Kayke Ayrton | 26 April 2008 (age 18) | 1 | 0 | (Brazil) Athletico Paranaense | v. Chile, 9 June 2026 |
| FW | Rayan Lelis | 19 January 2007 (age 19) | 1 | 0 | (Brazil) Cruzeiro | v. Chile, 9 June 2026 |
| FW | Lucca | 14 June 2007 (age 19) | 2 | 0 | (Brazil) São Paulo | v. Paraguay, 28 March 2026 |
| FW | Gui Negão | 6 February 2007 (age 19) | 0 | 0 | (Brazil) Corinthians | v. Paraguay, 28 March 2026^{INJ} |
| FW | Douglas Telles | 1 June 2007 (age 19) | 0 | 0 | (Brazil) Flamengo | v. Paraguay, 28 March 2026^{INJ} |
INJ: Withdrew due to injury; CLUB: Player withdrew from the current squad after his club made him unavailable for the call-up; WTD: Withdrew due personal reasons or rejected the call-up

== Top goalscorers ==
| Rank | Player | Year(s) | U-20 goals |
|---|---|---|---|
| 1 | Adaílton | 1997 | 24 |
| 2 | Marcos Leonardo | 2021–2023 | 15 |
| 3 | Romário | 1985 | 11 |
| 4 | Neymar | 2011 | 9 |
| 4 | Henrique | 2011 | 9 |
| 5 | Rodrigo Gral | 1999 | 8 |
| 5 | Edu | 1999 | 8 |
| 5 | Alexandre Pato | 2007 | 8 |
| 5 | Vitor Roque | 2022–2023 | 8 |
| 5 | Andrey Santos | 2021–2025 | 8 |
| 8 | Dudu Cearense | 2003 | 7 |
| 9 | Geovani | 1983 | 6 |
| 9 | Ronaldinho | 1999 | 6 |
| 9 | Adriano | 2001 | 6 |
| 9 | Daniel Carvalho | 2003 | 6 |
| 9 | Alan Kardec | 2009 | 6 |
| 9 | Marcos Guilherme | 2015 | 6 |
| 9 | Bruninho | 2026– | 6 |

=== Individual awards ===
- FIFA U-20 World Cup

| Year | Golden Ball | Silver Ball | Bronze Ball |
|---|---|---|---|
| 1983 | Geovani | | |
| 1985 | Silas | | |
| 1989 | Bismarck | | |
| 1993 | Adriano | | |
| 1995 | Caio | | |
| 2009 | | Alex Teixeira | Giuliano |
| 2011 | Henrique | | |
| 2015 | | Danilo | |

| Year | Golden Shoe | Silver Shoe | Bronze Shoe |
|---|---|---|---|
| 1977 | Guina | | |
| 1983 | Geovani | | |
| 1997 | Adaílton | | |
| 2003 | Dudu | | |
| 2011 | Henrique | | |

== Honours ==
- FIFA U-20 World Cup:
  - Winners (5): 1983, 1985, 1993, 2003, 2011
  - Runners-up (4): 1991, 1995, 2009, 2015
- South American Youth Championship:
  - Winners (13): 1974, 1983, 1985, 1989, 1991, 1993, 1995, 2001, 2007, 2009, 2011, 2023, 2025
  - Runners-up (7): 1954, 1977, 1981, 1987, 1997, 2003, 2005

=== Friendlies ===
- Tournoi Juniors de Cannes:
  - Winners (4): 1971, 1972, 1973, 1974
- Tournament of the Crown Prince:
  - Winners: 1978
- Toulon Tournament:
  - Winners (9): 1980, 1981, 1983, 1995, 1996, 2002, 2013, 2014, 2019
- Torneio Internacional de Ribeirão Preto:
  - Winners: 1981
- Beijing Youth Tournament:
  - Winners: 1986
- Qatar Friendship Tournament:
  - Winners: 1987
- COTIF:
  - Winners (3): 1990, 2002, 2014
- Copa Gobernador del Estado Carabobo:
  - Winners: 1992
- Val-Action Cup:
  - Winners: 1993
- King's Cup:
  - Winners: 1999
- Mediterranean International Cup U-20:
  - Winners (5): 2001, 2003, 2004, 2006, 2010
- Mediterranean International Cup U-18:
  - Winners (9): 2001, 2002, 2003, 2004, 2006, 2007, 2008, 2010, 2011
- TyC Asia Cup:
  - Winners: 2001
- Oman International Tournament:
  - Winners: 2002
- Malaysia International Tournament:
  - Winners: 2003
- Sendai Cup:
  - Winners (6): 2003, 2005, 2006, 2008, 2009, 2010
- SBS Cup:
  - Winners: 2004
- Valais Youth Cup:
  - Winners: 2013
- Panda Cup:
  - Winners: 2014
- Talca International Tournament:
  - Winners: 2016
- Torneio Quadrangular de Teresópolis:
  - Winners: 2020
- Torneio Internacional do Espírito Santo:
  - Winners: 2022

== Managers ==
- Luiz Vinhaes (1949)
- Valdemar Campos (1954)
- Newton Cardoso (1958)
- Mário Travaglini (1967)
- Antoninho (1973)
- José Teixeira (1974)
- Zizinho (1975)
- Evaristo de Macedo (1977)
- Mário Travaglini (1979)
- Nelsinho Rosa (1980)
- Antônio Ferreira (1981)
- Vavá (1981–1982)
- Sebastião Lapola (1983)
- Jair Pereira (1983–1985)
- Gílson Nunes (1986–1987)
- René Simões (1988–1989)
- Paulo Massa (1990)
- Ernesto Paulo (1991)
- Júlio César Leal (1992–1993)
- Carlos Alberto da Luz (1993–1994)
- Jairo Leal (1995)
- Toninho Barroso (1996-1999)
- João Carlos da Silva Costa (1999)
- Torres (2000)
- Carlos César (2001)
- Marcos Paquetá (2002)
- Valinhos (2003)
- Marcos Paquetá (2003)
- René Weber (2004–2006)
- Nelson Rodrigues (2007–2008)
- Rogério Lourenço (2008–2010)
- Luís Antônio Verdini (2010–2011)
- Ney Franco (2011–2012)
- Émerson Ávila (2013)
- Alexandre Gallo (2014–2015)
- Rogério Micale (2015–2017)
- Carlos Amadeu (2017–2019)
- André Jardine (2019–2022)
- Ramon Menezes (2022–2025)
- Paulo Victor Gomes (2026–)

== Head-to-head record ==
The following table shows Brazil's head-to-head record in the FIFA U-20 World Cup.

| Opponent | Pld | W | D | L | GF | GA | GD | Win % |
|---|---|---|---|---|---|---|---|---|
| Argentina | 6 | 3 | 0 | 3 | 4 | 6 | −2 | 50.00 |
| Australia | 4 | 3 | 0 | 1 | 11 | 4 | +7 | 75.00 |
| Austria | 1 | 1 | 0 | 0 | 3 | 0 | +3 | 100.00 |
| Belgium | 1 | 1 | 0 | 0 | 10 | 0 | +10 | 100.00 |
| Canada | 3 | 3 | 0 | 0 | 5 | 0 | +5 | 100.00 |
| Colombia | 1 | 1 | 0 | 0 | 6 | 0 | +6 | 100.00 |
| Costa Rica | 2 | 2 | 0 | 0 | 6 | 0 | +6 | 100.00 |
| Croatia | 1 | 1 | 0 | 0 | 4 | 0 | +4 | 100.00 |
| Czech Republic | 3 | 1 | 2 | 0 | 5 | 2 | +3 | 33.33 |
| Dominican Republic | 1 | 1 | 0 | 0 | 6 | 0 | +6 | 100.00 |
| East Germany | 1 | 1 | 0 | 0 | 2 | 0 | +2 | 100.00 |
| Egypt | 1 | 0 | 1 | 0 | 1 | 1 | +0 | 0.00 |
| France | 1 | 1 | 0 | 0 | 3 | 0 | +3 | 100.00 |
| Germany | 3 | 3 | 0 | 0 | 6 | 2 | +4 | 100.00 |
| Ghana | 3 | 1 | 1 | 1 | 3 | 3 | +0 | 33.33 |
| Honduras | 1 | 1 | 0 | 0 | 3 | 0 | +3 | 100.00 |
| Hungary | 1 | 1 | 0 | 0 | 2 | 1 | +1 | 100.00 |
| Iran | 1 | 1 | 0 | 0 | 5 | 1 | +4 | 100.00 |
| Iraq | 1 | 1 | 0 | 0 | 6 | 1 | +5 | 100.00 |
| Israel | 1 | 0 | 0 | 1 | 2 | 3 | −1 | 0.00 |
| Italy | 4 | 2 | 0 | 2 | 5 | 4 | +1 | 50.00 |
| Ivory Coast | 2 | 1 | 1 | 0 | 3 | 2 | +1 | 50.00 |
| Japan | 2 | 2 | 0 | 0 | 7 | 2 | +5 | 100.00 |
| Korea | 1 | 1 | 0 | 0 | 5 | 1 | +4 | 100.00 |
| Mali | 1 | 1 | 0 | 0 | 5 | 0 | +5 | 100.00 |
| Mexico | 5 | 2 | 3 | 0 | 9 | 6 | +3 | 40.00 |
| Morocco | 2 | 1 | 0 | 1 | 3 | 3 | +0 | 50.00 |
| Netherlands | 1 | 0 | 1 | 0 | 1 | 1 | +0 | 0.00 |
| Nigeria | 6 | 5 | 1 | 0 | 15 | 2 | +13 | 83.33 |
| North Korea | 1 | 1 | 0 | 0 | 3 | 0 | +3 | 100.00 |
| Norway | 1 | 1 | 0 | 0 | 2 | 0 | +2 | 100.00 |
| Panama | 1 | 1 | 0 | 0 | 4 | 0 | +4 | 100.00 |
| Poland | 1 | 0 | 0 | 1 | 0 | 1 | −1 | 0.00 |
| Portugal | 5 | 2 | 2 | 1 | 4 | 3 | +1 | 40.00 |
| Qatar | 2 | 1 | 0 | 1 | 4 | 3 | +1 | 50.00 |
| Republic of Ireland | 1 | 1 | 0 | 0 | 2 | 1 | +1 | 100.00 |
| Romania | 1 | 0 | 1 | 0 | 1 | 1 | +0 | 0.00 |
| Russia | 1 | 0 | 1 | 0 | 0 | 0 | +0 | 0.00 |
| Saudi Arabia | 3 | 2 | 1 | 0 | 4 | 0 | +4 | 66.67 |
| Senegal | 1 | 1 | 0 | 0 | 5 | 0 | +5 | 100.00 |
| Serbia | 1 | 0 | 0 | 1 | 1 | 2 | −1 | 0.00 |
| Slovakia | 1 | 1 | 0 | 0 | 2 | 1 | +1 | 100.00 |
| South Africa | 1 | 1 | 0 | 0 | 2 | 0 | +2 | 100.00 |
| South Korea | 5 | 5 | 0 | 0 | 20 | 6 | +14 | 100.00 |
| Soviet Union | 2 | 2 | 0 | 0 | 5 | 1 | +4 | 100.00 |
| Spain | 7 | 3 | 1 | 3 | 8 | 9 | −1 | 42.86 |
| Sweden | 1 | 1 | 0 | 0 | 2 | 0 | +2 | 100.00 |
| Switzerland | 1 | 1 | 0 | 0 | 1 | 0 | +1 | 100.00 |
| Syria | 2 | 2 | 0 | 0 | 7 | 0 | +7 | 100.00 |
| Tunisia | 1 | 1 | 0 | 0 | 4 | 1 | +3 | 100.00 |
| United States | 4 | 3 | 0 | 1 | 9 | 3 | +6 | 75.00 |
| Uruguay | 4 | 2 | 1 | 1 | 8 | 3 | +5 | 50.00 |
| Yugoslavia | 1 | 0 | 0 | 1 | 1 | 2 | −1 | 0.00 |
| Zambia | 1 | 1 | 0 | 0 | 5 | 1 | +4 | 100.00 |
| Total | 111 | 75 | 17 | 19 | 250 | 83 | +167 | 67.57 |

== See also ==
- Brazil national football team
- Brazil national under-23 football team
- Brazil national under-17 football team
- Santos FC and the Brazil national football team
