= Dell (footballer) =

Brazilian footballer (born 2008)

Personal information
- Full name: Wenderson Wanderley Santos de Melo
- Date of birth: 9 June 2008 (age 18)
- Place of birth: Estância, Sergipe, Brazil
- Position: Forward

Team information
- Current team: Bahia
- Number: 89

Youth career
- 2023–: Bahia

Senior career*
Years	Team	Apps	(Gls)
2025–	Bahia	14	(4)

International career
2024	Brazil U15		
2025–	Brazil U17	7	(2)
- * Club domestic league appearances and goals as of 7 April 2026

Wenderson Wanderley Santos de Melo (born 9 June 2008), better known as Dell, is a Brazilian professional footballer who plays as forward for Campeonato Brasileiro Série A club Bahia.

== Career ==
A striker, Dell rose to prominence in 2024 alongside teammate Ruan Pablo, joining the Brazil U-15 and U-17 national teams led by coach Dudu Patetuci. He made his professional debut on 15 February 2025, against Barcelona de Ilhéus.

== Style of play ==
Due to his continued good performances in youth competitions, he was also nicknamed the "Haaland of Sertão", comparing him to the Norwegian footballer who plays for Manchester City.

== Honours ==
Bahia

- Campeonato Baiano: 2025, 2026

Brazil U17

- South American U-17 Championship: 2025

Individual

- FIFA U-17 World Cup Bronze Boot: 2025
