= Yimvert Berroterán =

Venezuelan footballer (2008–2026)

Personal information
- Date of birth: 4 May 2008
- Place of birth: Caracas, Venezuela
- Date of death: 26 June 2026 (aged 18)
- Place of death: La Guaira, Venezuela
- Height: 1.83 m (6 ft 0 in)
- Position: Forward

Senior career*
Years	Team	Apps	(Gls)
2025–2026	Universidad Central	4	(0)

International career
2024	Venezuela U15	4	(2)
2025	Venezuela U17	17	(3)
2026	Venezuela U20	3	(0)
Medal record
Men's football
Representing Venezuela
South American U-17 Championship
Third place	2025 Colombia
- * Club domestic league appearances and goals

Yimvert Berroterán (4 May 2008 – 26 June 2026) was a Venezuelan footballer who played as a forward.

== Club career ==
Berroterán made his debut for Universidad Central on 20 April 2025, in a 2–0 win against Rayo Zuliano. He later played three matches during the 2026 season.

== International career ==
In March 2025, Berroterán was called up to Venezuela's under-17 team for the 2025 South American U-17 Championship. He scored twice during the tournament, in the opening match against Bolivia, and in the third-place match against Chile. He was later included in Venezuela's 2025 FIFA U-17 World Cup squad on 1 November, and played three matches as they topped their group, beating England in the process. In total, he scored three goals in 17 matches for the under-17s.

In June 2026, he played three matches for Venezuela's under-20 national team at the 2026 Maurice Revello Tournament.

== Death ==
Following the 2026 Venezuela earthquakes, Berroterán was found dead on 26 June 2026, at the age of 18, alongside his partner.

== Honours ==
Venezuela U17

- South American U-17 Championship third place: 2025
