= Kayke Santos =

Brazilian footballer (born 2008)

Personal information
- Full name: Kayke Ayrton dos Santos Evaristo
- Date of birth: 26 April 2008 (age 18)
- Place of birth: Rio de Janeiro, Brazil
- Position: Winger

Team information
- Current team: Athletico Paranaense
- Number: 43

Youth career
- 2021–: Athletico Paranaense

Senior career*
Years	Team	Apps	(Gls)
2024–	Athletico Paranaense	5	(0)

International career^{‡}
2023–2024	Brazil U15		
2025	Brazil U17	14	(1)
2026–	Brazil U20	1	(0)
- * Club domestic league appearances and goals as of 19:09, 10 November 2026 (UTC) ‡ National team caps and goals as of 19:09, 10 November 2026 (UTC)

Kayke Ayrton dos Santos Evaristo (born 26 April 2008), known as Kayke Santos, Kayke Ayrton or just Kayke, is a Brazilian footballer who plays as a winger for Athletico Paranaense.

== Club career ==
Born in Rio de Janeiro, Kayke was an Athletico Paranaense youth graduate, having joined the side in 2021. After progressing through the youth setup, he signed his first professional contract on 12 June 2024, and made his senior – and Série A – debut the following day, coming on as a late substitute for Nikão in a 3–1 home win over Criciúma.

== International career ==
Kayke represented Brazil at under-15 level. and for the 2025 South American U-17 Championship, where the Brazil won the title.

== Career statistics ==
As of 17 June 2024

Club	Season	League			State League		Cup		Continental		Other		Total	
Club	Season	Division	Apps	Goals	Apps	Goals	Apps	Goals	Apps	Goals	Apps	Goals	Apps	Goals
Athletico Paranaense	2024	Série A	1	0	—		0	0	0	0	—		1	0
Athletico Paranaense	2025	Série B	0	0	2	0	0	0	—		3 (Note: Appearance(s) in Copa Paraná)	0	5	0
Athletico Paranaense	2026	Série A	0	0	2	0	0	0	—		7	0	9	0
Total			1	0	4	0	0	0	0	0	10	0	15	0

== Honours ==
Brazil U17

- South American U-17 Championship: 2025
