= Thomás de Martis =

Argentine footballer (born 2008)

Personal information
- Full name: Thomás de Martis de la Rosa
- Date of birth: 26 June 2008 (age 18)
- Place of birth: Mar del Plata, Buenos Aires Province, Argentina
- Height: 1.81 m (5 ft 11 in)
- Position: Forward

Team information
- Current team: Parma (on loan from Lanús)
- Number: 25

Youth career
- River Plate
- 2019–2025: Lanús

Senior career*
Years	Team	Apps	(Gls)
2025–	Lanús	6	(0)
2026–	→ Parma (loan)	0	(0)

International career^{‡}
2024	Argentina U15	5	(3)
2024	Argentina U16	3	(2)
2024–2025	Argentina U17	15	(9)
- * Club domestic league appearances and goals as of 22 August 2026 ‡ National team caps and goals as of 14 November 2025

Thomás de Martis de la Rosa (born 26 June 2008) is an Argentine professional footballer who plays as a forward for Serie A club Parma, on loan from Primera División club Lanús.

== Club career ==
Born in Mar del Plata in the Buenos Aires Province of Argentina, Thomás de Martis joined Lanús football academy in 2019. He signed his first professional contract with the club in June 2024..

On 15 August 2025 he made his first team debut in Copa Sudamericana match against Central Córdoba.

On 18 August 2026, de Martis moved to Parma in Italy on a season-long loan.

== International career ==
Thomás de Martis has represented the Argentina national U15, U16 and U17 teams. He played in 2025 South American U-17 Championship, scoring 6 goals and became the top scorer of the tournament.
