= Diego Claut =

Venezuelan footballer (born 2008)

Personal information
- Full name: Diego Alejandro Claut Ordaz
- Date of birth: 3 January 2008 (age 18)
- Place of birth: Caracas, Venezuela
- Height: 1.76 m (5 ft 9 in)
- Position: Forward

Team information
- Current team: Deportivo Miranda
- Number: 21

Youth career
- 2013–2017: Escuela Simón Bolívar
- Academia Fratelsa
- 2022–2024: Deportivo Miranda

Senior career*
Years	Team	Apps	(Gls)
2024–	Deportivo Miranda	15	(4)

International career^{‡}
2024	Venezuela U15	4	(0)
2025	Venezuela U17	11	(5)
2026–	Venezuela U20	6	(3)
Medal record
Men's football
Representing Venezuela
Central American and Caribbean Games
Gold medal – first place	2026 Santo Domingo
South American U-17 Championship
Third place	2025 Colombia
- * Club domestic league appearances and goals as of 10 May 2026 ‡ National team caps and goals as of 7 August 2025

Diego Alejandro Claut Ordaz (born 3 January 2008) is a Venezuelan footballer who currently plays as a forward for Deportivo Miranda.

== Club career ==
Born in the Venezuelan capital of Caracas, Claut played futsal between the ages of five and nine, honing his skills at the Escuela Simón Bolívar. He went on to join Academia Fratelsa, a feeder team of professional club Deportivo Miranda, known at the time as Deportivo Petare, before being enrolled in the academy of Deportivo Miranda themselves.

In the 2024 season, Claut scored twenty goals in the Liga FUTVE Junior, and was handed his first-team debut by manager Andrea Fabri, which he marked with the only goal in Deportivo Miranda's 1–0 win against Fundación AIFI. He would only feature once more in the season, playing the full ninety minutes against Atlético La Cruz, before returning to the first team with two goals in Deportivo Miranda's 4–1 win against Monagas B on 27 April 2025.

== International career ==
Already a Venezuelan youth international at under-15 level, Claut was called up to the under-17 squad for the 2025 South American U-17 Championship, where he finished as third highest goal-scorer with four goals. Venezuela were knocked out of the competition at the semi-final round, with Claut scoring in their 5–1 loss to Colombia, but their third-place finish after a 3–0 win against Chile still qualified them for the 2025 FIFA U-17 World Cup.

At the 2025 FIFA U-17 World Cup Claut featured in all three of Venezuela's group stage games, starting in his nation's win and draw against England and Egypt, respectively, before notching his first goal of the tournament against Haiti in their final group stage match – a 4–2 win.

== Personal life ==
Claut is of Italian descent and holds Italian nationality through his family.

== Career statistics ==
=== Club ===
As of 12 November 2025.

Appearances and goals by club, season and competition
Club	Season	League			Cup (Note: Includes Copa Venezuela)		Continental		Other		Total	
Club	Season	Division	Apps	Goals	Apps	Goals	Apps	Goals	Apps	Goals	Apps	Goals
Deportivo Miranda	2024	Liga FUTVE 2	2	1	0	0	–		0	0	2	1
Deportivo Miranda	2025	Liga FUTVE 2	4	3	1	0	–		0	0	5	3
Career total			6	4	1	0	0	0	0	0	7	4

== Honours ==
Venezuela U20

- Central American and Caribbean Games: 2026

Venezuela U17

- South American U-17 Championship third place: 2025
