= Carlos César (football manager) =

Brazilian football manager (born 1943)

Personal information
- Full name: Carlos César Ramos Custódio
- Date of birth: February 27, 1943 (age 83)
- Place of birth: Rio de Janeiro, Brazil

Managerial career
- Years: Team
- 1975: Brazil U23
- 1975–1977: Vasco da Gama U-20
- 1978–1981: Fluminense U-20
- 1986: Al-Salmiya U-20
- 1987: Al-Jazira U-20
- 1989–1990: Al-Ettifaq
- 1993–1994: Fluminense U-20
- 1996–1997: Brazil U17
- 1997: Fluminense U-20
- 1999–2002: Flamengo (caretaker)
- 2001: Brazil U20
- 2004–2005: América
- 2006: Paysandu
- 2009: Duque de Caxias
- 2012: Bangu

Carlos César Ramos Custódio also known as Carlos César (born February 27, 1943) is a football manager who last worked.

== Honours ==
=== Brazil ===
- South American Under-17 Football Championship (2): 1997, 1999
- FIFA U-17 World Cup (2): 1997, 1999
- South American Youth Championship: 2001
