= Martín Jiménez =

Chilean footballer

Personal information
- Full name: Martín Vicente Jiménez Salinas
- Date of birth: 6 February 2008 (age 18)
- Place of birth: Maipú, Santiago, Chile
- Height: 1.82 m (6 ft 0 in)
- Position: Right wing-back

Team information
- Current team: Audax Italiano
- Number: 20

Youth career
- 2016–2024: Audax Italiano

Senior career*
Years	Team	Apps	(Gls)
2024–	Audax Italiano	18	(0)

International career^{‡}
2024	Chile U15	6	(0)
2024–2026	Chile U17	10	(2)
2026–	Chile U20	9	(0)
- * Club domestic league appearances and goals as of 12 September 2026 ‡ National team caps and goals as of 25 September 2026

Martín Vicente Jiménez Salinas (born 6 February 2008) is a Chilean footballer who plays as a right wing-back for Chilean Primera División side Audax Italiano.

== Club career ==
Born in Maipú commune, Santiago de Chile, Jiménez joined the Audax Italiano youth ranks in 2016. He was promoted to the first team at the age of 16 and signed his first professional contract on 23 April 2025.

Jiménez made his senior debut in the 3–1 home victory against Unión Española on 6 February 2025 for the Copa Chile, on his birthday. At league level, he made his debut in the 2025 Liga de Primera match against Deportes La Serena on 4 May. The next year, he took part in the Copa Sudamericana.

== International career ==
Jiménez represented Chile at under-15 level in the 2023 South American Championship what was held in October 2024.

In 2025, Jiménez represented the under-17's at the South American Championship and the FIFA World Cup.

After representing Chile U20 in friendlies against Peru and Brazil, Jiménez was called up to the squad for the 2026 South American Games.
