= Ryan Augusto =

Brazilian footballer

Personal information
- Full name: Ryan Augusto Tavares da Silva
- Date of birth: 4 September 2007 (age 19)
- Place of birth: Rio de Janeiro, Brazil
- Height: 1.79 m (5 ft 10 in)
- Position: Right-back

Team information
- Current team: Red Bull Bragantino
- Number: 52

Youth career
- 2022–: Red Bull Bragantino

Senior career*
Years	Team	Apps	(Gls)
2026–	Red Bull Bragantino	12	(0)

International career^{‡}
2026–	Brazil U20	7	(0)
- * Club domestic league appearances and goals as of 14:59, 10 November 2026 (UTC) ‡ National team caps and goals as of 19:09, 6 October 2026 (UTC)

Ryan Augusto Tavares da Silva (born 4 September 2007), known as Ryan Augusto or just Ryan, is a Brazilian professional footballer who plays as a right-back for Série A club Red Bull Bragantino.

== Club career ==
Born in Rio de Janeiro, Ryan joined Red Bull Bragantino's youth sides in 2022, aged 14. In January 2026, after establishing himself as a regular member of the under-20 team, he renewed his contract until January 2029.

Ryan made his first team – and Série A – debut on 15 March 2026, coming on as a late substitute for Andrés Hurtado in a 2–1 home loss to São Paulo.

== International career ==
On 14 March 2026, Ryan was called up to the Brazil national under-20 team for two friendlies against Paraguay.

== Career statistics ==
As of 10 November 2026

Appearances and goals by club, season and competition
Club	Season	League			State league		Copa do Brasil		Continental		Other		Total	
Club	Season	Division	Apps	Goals	Apps	Goals	Apps	Goals	Apps	Goals	Apps	Goals	Apps	Goals
Red Bull Bragantino	2026	Série A	12	0	0	0	0	0	1 (Note: Appearance(s) in Copa Sudamericana)	0	—		13	0
Career total			12	0	0	0	0	0	1	0	0	0	13	0
