= Juan Cruz Meza =

Argentine footballer (born 2008)

Personal information
- Full name: Juan Cruz Meza
- Date of birth: 14 March 2008 (age 18)
- Place of birth: Caá Catí, Corrientes, Argentina
- Height: 1.83 m (6 ft 0 in)
- Position: Attacking midfielder

Team information
- Current team: River Plate
- Number: 24

Youth career
- 2018–2025: River Plate

Senior career*
Years	Team	Apps	(Gls)
2025–	River Plate	15	(0)

International career^{‡}
2024	Argentina U16	2	(1)
2025	Argentina U17	7	(1)
- * Club domestic league appearances and goals as of 17:58, 10 July 2026 (UTC) ‡ National team caps and goals as of 12 April 2025

Juan Cruz Meza (born 14 March 2008) is an Argentine footballer who plays as an attacking midfielder for Argentine Primera División club River Plate

== Club career ==
Born in Caá Catí in the Corrientes Province of Argentina, Juan Cruz joined River Plate football academy in 2018. He signed his first professional contract with the club in June 2024. On 13 July 2025 he made his first team debut in Primera División match against Platense.

== International career ==
Juan Cruz Meza has represented the Argentina national U16 and U17 teams. He played in 2025 South American U-17 Championship, scoring against Paraguay.

== Personal life ==
Juan Cruz is the younger brother of fellow River Plate player Maximiliano.
