= Sebastián Martínez (referee) =

Argentine football referee

- Full name: Sebastián Nicolás Martínez Beligoy
- Born: January 10, 1990 (age 36); Bahía Blanca, Argentina

Domestic
Years	League	Role
2019–	Primera B	Referee
2021–	Primera Nacional	Referee
2022–	Argentine Primera División	Referee

International
Years	League	Role
2025–	FIFA listed	Referee

Sebastián Nicolás Martínez Beligoy (born 10 January 1990) is an Argentine football referee. He has officiated in the Argentine Primera División since 2022 and was named to the FIFA International Referees List for 2025.

== Early life ==
Martínez was born in Bahía Blanca, Buenos Aires Province. He is the nephew of former Argentine referee Federico Beligoy.

== Career ==
Martínez began refereeing in competitions organized by the Argentine Football Association (AFA). His appointments included matches in Primera B from 2019 and Primera Nacional from 2021.

On 22 October 2022, he made his Primera División debut in the match between Unión de Santa Fe and Central Córdoba (Santiago del Estero). Central Córdoba won the match 4–1.

In December 2024, FIFA announced its list of international referees for the 2025 season, which included Martínez among the officials representing Argentina.

Since his promotion to the top division, Martínez has officiated matches in the Argentine Primera División and other competitions organized by the (AFA).
