= Ashley Trujillo =

Colombian footballer (born 2008)

Personal information
- Full name: Ashley Trujillo Castaño
- Date of birth: 10 December 2008 (age 17)
- Place of birth: London, England
- Height: 1.77 m (5 ft 10 in)
- Position: Forward

Team information
- Current team: Queens Park Rangers

Youth career
- –2025: Queens Park Rangers

Senior career*
Years	Team	Apps	(Gls)
2025–	Queens Park Rangers	0	(0)

International career
2025	Colombia U17	3	(1)
Medal record
Men's football
Representing Colombia
South American U-20 Championship
Runner-up	2025 Colombia
- * Club domestic league appearances and goals as of 12 August 2025 (UTC)

Ashley Trujillo Castaño (born 10 December 2008) is a professional footballer who plays as a forward for EFL Championship club Queens Park Rangers. Born in England, he represents Colombia at youth level.

== Club career ==
=== Queens Park Rangers ===
He began his career in the youth divisions of Queens Park Rangers, where he quickly stood out for his scoring ability and vision of the game. On 12 August 2025, he made his professional debut for Queens Park Rangers in the EFL Cup, coming on as a substitute in a 3–2 defeat to Plymouth Argyle.

== International career ==
He represented the Colombian Under-17 national team on three occasions in 2025.

Trujillo has played internationally for Colombia at youth level. He was called up to Colombia's U17s in June 2021 and made his debut in a 1–0 victory over Chile in Montería on 28 March 2025.

He stood out in the tournament as the team's number 10, scoring a crucial goal in the victory against Peru and helping the team reach the final, where they won the silver medal.

== Career statistics ==
As of match played 12 August 2025

Appearances and goals by club, season and competition
Club	Season	League			FA Cup		EFL Cup		Other		Total	
Club	Season	Division	Apps	Goals	Apps	Goals	Apps	Goals	Apps	Goals	Apps	Goals
Queens Park Rangers	2025–26	Championship	0	0	0	0	1	0	—		1	0
Queens Park Rangers	Total		0	0	0	0	1	0	—		1	0
Career total			3	0	0	0	1	0	0	0	1	0

== Honours ==
Colombia U17

- South American U-17 Championship runner-up: 2025
