= Uriel Ojeda =

Argentine footballer (born 2008)

Personal information
- Full name: Elián Uriel Ojeda
- Date of birth: 22 March 2008 (age 18)
- Place of birth: Ramos Mejía, Buenos Aires, Argentina
- Height: 1.72 m (5 ft 8 in)
- Position: Attacking midfielder

Team information
- Current team: San Lorenzo

Youth career
- La Lomita
- 17 de Agosto
- 2015–2026: San Lorenzo

Senior career*
Years	Team	Apps	(Gls)
2026–	San Lorenzo	1	(0)

International career
2024	Argentina U15	6	(1)
2024–	Argentina U17	10	(6)
- * Club domestic league appearances and goals as of 18:11, 21 November 2026 (UTC)

Elián Uriel Ojeda (born 22 March 2008) is an Argentine footballer who plays as an attacking midfielder for San Lorenzo.

== Club career ==
Born in the Ramos Mejía neighbourhood of Buenos Aires, Ojeda began his career at Moreno-based amateur club La Lomita. Having also played for youth team 17 de Agosto, he was brought to the academy of professional club San Lorenzo in 2015, at the age of six. After scoring twenty-one goals in 2023, he signed his first professional contract the following year at the age of sixteen - a two-year deal running through 2026 with a buyout clause worth $20 million.

Promoted to the reserve team in October 2024, he became a key player under manager Damián Ayude, and began training on occasion with the San Lorenzo first team, before officially being added to the squad by manager Miguel Ángel Russo in April 2025.

== International career ==
He was called up to the Argentina under-17 squad for the 2025 South American U-17 Championship, though his two goals and two assists could not prevent Argentina from failing to qualify for the final four. He was called up again for the 2025 FIFA U-17 World Cup, and featured in wins against Belgium and Tunisia. He scored a hat-trick against Fiji in Argentina's last group stage game, also serving as captain as they ran out 7–0 winners.

== Style of play ==
Initially a centre-forward, Ojeda transitioned to play in an attacking midfield role during his early years at San Lorenzo, operating as either a false-nine, a playmaker or as the attacking half of a pivot. A noted goal-scoring midfielder, Ojeda himself has stated that he "identifies with [Sergio] Agüero", describing himself as "precise" and liking to "receive the ball so [he] can create chances in one-on-one situations."
