= Elías Legendre =

Ecuadorian footballer (born 2009)

Personal information
- Full name: Elias Alexandre Legendre Quiñónez
- Date of birth: 22 April 2008 (age 18)
- Place of birth: La Concordia, Ecuador
- Height: 1.79 m (5 ft 10 in)
- Position: Winger

Team information
- Current team: Rennes
- Number: 35

Youth career
- 2015–2018: CPB Bréquigny
- 2018–2021: CO.Pacé
- 2021–: Rennes

Senior career*
Years	Team	Apps	(Gls)
2025–	Rennes B	13	(2)
2025–	Rennes	6	(0)

International career^{‡}
2024	France U16	2	(0)
2025	France U17	2	(2)
2025–	Ecuador U17	5	(1)
- * Club domestic league appearances and goals as of 00:58, 17 May 2026 (UTC) ‡ National team caps and goals as of 16:53, 21 May 2025 (UTC)

Elías Alexander Legendre Quiñónez (born 22 April 2008) is an Ecuadorian professional footballer who plays as a winger for Ligue 1 club Rennes. He holds both French and Ecuadorian nationalities.

== Early life ==
Legendre was born in La Concordia, Ecuador to a French father and Ecuadorian mother, and moved to France as a child in 2015.

== Club career ==
On his arrival in France, Legendre joined local side Cercle Paul Bert Bréquigny, where he spent three years before a move to CO.Pacé. In 2021 he joined the academy of Stade Rennais, and the following year he signed a youth contract with the club in June 2022. In the 2023–24 season, he scored fifty goals at youth level, and at under-16 level he finished as top scorer at the 2024 edition of the Montaigu Tournament.

== International career ==
Having represented France at under-16 level already, Legendre stated in an interview with Kily Fútbol that he was happy to represent both France and Ecuador at international level, and that Ecuador had not previously contacted him about the possibility. In the same interview, he revealed that he had been invited to an Ecuadorian under-17 microcycle in August 2024. In December 2024, he told journalist César Mosquera that he wished to represent Ecuador at the 2025 South American U-17 Championship, and that the Ecuadorian Football Federation had sent documentation to his club, Stade Rennais, for this to happen.

He played twice for France's under-17 side in February 2025, scoring twice, before receiving a call up to the Ecuador under-17 for the South American U-17 Championship. In Ecuador's opening game against Uruguay, Legendre scored after just thirty-one seconds as Ecuador went on to win 4–0. In Ecuador's determining match against Paraguay, Legendre scored his penalty as Ecuador lost 5–4 in the shoot-out.

== Style of play ==
Legendre has been described as a "versatile forward", capable of playing as a centre-forward and a winger, by online newspaper elDiario.es journalist Jaime Ugalde, who also noted his speed, strength and technical ability. Having praised his goalscoring ability, Ugalde tipped him to be a successor to Enner Valencia, Ecuador's all-time leading scorer.
