= Brazil national under-17 football team =

National association football team

Brazil U-17
- Nickname(s): Seleção Sub-17 (The Selection U-17); Canarinha (Little Canary); Amarelinha (Little Yellow); Verde-Amarela (Green-Yellow)
- Association: Confederação Brasileira de Futebol (Brazilian Football Confederation)
- Confederation: CONMEBOL (South America)
- Head coach: Dudu Patetuci
- FIFA code: BRA
First colours	Second colours

First international
- Brazil 2–2 Italy (Bogotá, Colombia; 17 January 1984)

Biggest win
- Brazil 9–0 New Caledonia (Jakarta, Indonesia; 14 November 2023)

Biggest defeat
- Mexico 3–0 Brazil (Lima, Peru; 2 October 2005); Nigeria 3–0 Brazil (Viña del Mar, Chile; 1 November 2015); Uruguay 3–0 Brazil (Guadalajara, Mexico; 17 July 2011); Argentina 3–0 Brazil (Lima, Peru; 30 March 2019); Argentina 3–0 Brazil (Jakarta, Indonesia; 24 November 2023); Brazil 0–3 Colombia (Asunción, Paraguay; 16 April 2026) Records for competitive matches only.

FIFA U-17 World Cup
- Appearances: 19 (first in 1985)
- Best result: Champions (1997, 1999, 2003, and 2019)

South American U-17 Championship
- Appearances: 20 (first in 1985)
- Best result: Champions (1988, 1991, 1995, 1997, 1999, 2001, 2005, 2007, 2009, 2011, 2015, 2017, 2023 and 2025)

Brazil national under-17 football team
Medal record

FIFA U-17 World Cup
Bronze medal – third place	1985 People's Republic of China	Team
Silver medal – second place	1995 Ecuador	Team
Gold medal – first place	1997 Egypt	Team
Gold medal – first place	1999 New Zealand	Team
Gold medal – first place	2003 Finland	Team
Silver medal – second place	2005 Peru	Team
Bronze medal – third place	2017 India	Team
Gold medal – first place	2019 Brazil	Team

Brazil national under-17 football team
Medal record

South American Under-17 Football Championship
Silver medal – second place	1985 Argentina	NA
Silver medal – second place	1986 Peru	NA
Gold medal – first place	1988 Ecuador	NA
Gold medal – first place	1991 Paraguay	NA
Gold medal – first place	1995 Peru	NA
Gold medal – first place	1997 Paraguay	NA
Gold medal – first place	1999 Uruguay	NA
Gold medal – first place	2001 Peru	NA
Silver medal – second place	2003 Bolivia	NA
Gold medal – first place	2005 Venezuela	Team
Gold medal – first place	2007 Ecuador	Team
Gold medal – first place	2009 Chile	Team
Gold medal – first place	2011 Ecuador	Team
Bronze medal – third place	2013 Argentina	Team
Gold medal – first place	2015 Paraguay	Team
Gold medal – first place	2017 Chile	Team
Gold medal – first place	2023 Ecuador	Team
Gold medal – first place	2025 Colombia	Team

The Brazil national under-17 football team, also known as Brazil Under-17s or Seleção Sub-17, represents Brazil in association football, at an under-17 age level and is controlled by the Brazilian Football Confederation, the governing body for football in Brazil. Their head coach is Phelipe Leal.

Brazil holds the joint record for most appearances in the FIFA U-17 World Cup (19). The nation has won the tournament four times, finished runner‑up twice and reached the semi‑finals a record 10 times. Brazil also leads the competition in matches played, victories, goals scored and goal difference.

Brazil hosted the 2019 FIFA U-17 World Cup. It was the first time that Brazil ever hosted a FIFA youth tournament. The tournament cumulated in Brazil lifting their 4th FIFA U-17 World Cup, making it the first time ever that Brazil had won a FIFA World Cup competition at home.

== Competitive record ==
- A gold background color indicates that Brazil won the tournament.

=== FIFA U-17 World Cup ===
FIFA U-17 World Cup record
Year	Round	Position	GP	W	D*	L	GS	GA
(China) 1985	Third place	3rd	6	4	0	2	13	8
(Canada) 1987	Group stage	14th	3	0	2	1	0	1
(Scotland) 1989	Quarter-finals	8th	4	2	1	1	5	3
(Italy) 1991	Quarter-finals	6th	4	3	0	1	8	2
(Japan) 1993	Did not qualify							
(Ecuador) 1995	Runners-up	2nd	6	4	1	1	13	4
(Egypt) 1997	Champions	1st	6	6	0	0	21	2
(New Zealand) 1999	Champions	1st	6	2	4	0	8	4
(Trinidad and Tobago) 2001	Quarter-finals	5th	4	3	0	1	11	4
(Finland) 2003	Champions	1st	6	5	1	0	15	1
(Peru) 2005	Runners-up	2nd	6	4	0	2	16	11
(South Korea) 2007	Round of 16	10th	4	2	0	2	14	4
(Nigeria) 2009	Group stage	17th	3	1	0	2	3	4
(Mexico) 2011	Fourth place	4th	7	4	1	2	15	12
(United Arab Emirates) 2013	Quarter-finals	5th	5	4	1	0	19	4
(Chile) 2015	Quarter-finals	6th	5	3	0	2	5	5
(India) 2017	Third place	3rd	7	6	0	1	14	5
(Brazil) 2019	Champions	1st	7	7	0	0	19	6
(Indonesia) 2023	Quarter-finals	6th	5	3	0	2	16	8
(Qatar) 2025	Fourth place	4th	8	3	5	0	15	3
(Qatar) 2026	In progress	TBD	1	1	0	0	2	1
(Qatar) 2027	To be determined							
(Qatar) 2028	To be determined							
(Qatar) 2029	To be determined							
Total:20/21	4 Titles		103	67	16	20	232	92

=== South American U-17 Championship ===
South American U-17 Championship record
Year	Round	GP	W	D^{1}	L	GS	GA
(Argentina) 1985	Runners-up	8	7	0	1	25	7
(Peru) 1986	Runners-up	7	1	6	0	6	5
(Ecuador) 1988	Champions	7	6	1	0	14	1
(Paraguay) 1991	Champions	7	5	0	2	18	6
(Colombia) 1993	Fourth place	7	4	2	1	13	9
(Peru) 1995	Champions	7	6	0	1	19	4
(Paraguay) 1997	Champions	7	5	2	0	20	7
(Uruguay) 1999	Champions	6	5	1	0	17	6
(Peru) 2001	Champions	7	4	3	0	18	5
(Bolivia) 2003	Runners-up	7	5	1	1	15	4
(Venezuela) 2005	Champions	7	5	1	1	27	11
(Ecuador) 2007	Champions	9	6	1	2	29	11
(Chile) 2009	Champions	5	3	1	1	12	4
(Ecuador) 2011	Champions	9	7	1	1	22	11
(Argentina) 2013	Third place	9	5	4	0	14	6
(Paraguay) 2015	Champions	9	5	1	3	18	14
(Chile) 2017	Champions	9	7	2	0	24	3
(Peru) 2019	Group stage	4	2	1	1	7	8
(Ecuador) 2023	Champions	9	7	2	0	24	10
(Colombia) 2025	Champions	6	4	2	0	10	4
(Paraguay) 2026	Third place	6	5	0	1	14	4
Total	21/21	152	104	32	16	366	140

^{1}Draws include knockout matches decided on penalty kicks.

*Draws include knockout matches decided on penalty kicks.

== Fixtures and recent results ==
The following is a list of match results from the previous 12 months, as well as any future matches that have been scheduled.

Win Draw Loss

=== 2026 ===
September 24 UEFA Friendship Cup 2026	Brazil	6–0	Canada	Nyon, Switzerland
TBD	Conceição 27'; Furquim 57' (pen.), 90+1'; Brendo 62'; Caramico 67', 88'	Report		Stadium: Centre sportif de Colovray

== Current squad ==
The following 23 players are called up to the squad for the 2025 South American U-17 Championship.

No.	Pos.	Player	Date of birth (age)	Club
	GK	Arthur Nascimento	30 March 2008 (aged 16)	(Brazilian Football Confederation) Bahia
	GK	João Pedro	18 March 2008 (aged 17)	(Brazilian Football Confederation) Santos
	GK	Kaio de Assis	3 May 2008 (aged 16)	(Brazilian Football Confederation) Atlético Mineiro
	DF	Angelo	20 October 2008 (aged 16)	(Brazilian Football Confederation) São Paulo
	DF	Arthur Ryan	18 March 2008 (aged 17)	(Brazilian Football Confederation) Fluminense
	DF	Denner	25 February 2008 (aged 17)	(The Football Association) Chelsea
	DF	Luis Eduardo	16 January 2008 (aged 17)	(Brazilian Football Confederation) Grêmio
	DF	Kauã Prates	12 August 2008 (aged 16)	(Brazilian Football Confederation) Cruzeiro
	DF	Rafael Gonzaga	7 February 2008 (aged 17)	(Brazilian Football Confederation) Santos
	DF	Vitor Fernandes	4 March 2008 (aged 17)	(Brazilian Football Confederation) Atlético Mineiro
	DF	Vitor Hugo	12 June 2008 (aged 16)	(Brazilian Football Confederation) Cruzeiro
	MF	Andrey Fernandes	5 February 2008 (aged 17)	(Brazilian Football Confederation) Vasco da Gama
	MF	Felipe de Morais	29 August 2008 (aged 16)	(Brazilian Football Confederation) Cruzeiro
	MF	Gustavo Gomes	10 January 2008 (aged 17)	(Brazilian Football Confederation) Athletico Paranaense
	MF	Luis Felipe	2 February 2008 (aged 17)	(Brazilian Football Confederation) Palmeiras
	MF	Tiago Augusto	2 February 2008 (aged 17)	(Brazilian Football Confederation) Grêmio
	MF	Zé Lucas	23 March 2008 (aged 17)	(Brazilian Football Confederation) Sport Recife
	FW	Dell	9 June 2008 (aged 16)	(Brazilian Football Confederation) Bahia
	FW	Gabriel Mec	11 April 2008 (aged 16)	(Brazilian Football Confederation) Grêmio
	FW	Luís Gustavo	27 February 2008 (aged 17)	(Brazilian Football Confederation) Red Bull Bragantino
	FW	Naarã	12 January 2008 (aged 17)	(Brazilian Football Confederation) Fluminense
	FW	Ruan Pablo	23 July 2008 (aged 16)	(Brazilian Football Confederation) Bahia
	FW	Wesley Natã	18 April 2008 (aged 16)	(Brazilian Football Confederation) Fluminense

== Honours ==
- FIFA U-17 World Cup:
  - Champions (4): 1997, 1999, 2003, 2019
  - Runners-up (2): 1995, 2005
- South American U-17 Championship:
  - Champions (14): 1988, 1991, 1995, 1997, 1999, 2001, 2005, 2007, 2009, 2011, 2015, 2017, 2023, 2025
  - Runners-up (3): 1985, 1986, 2003

=== Friendlies ===
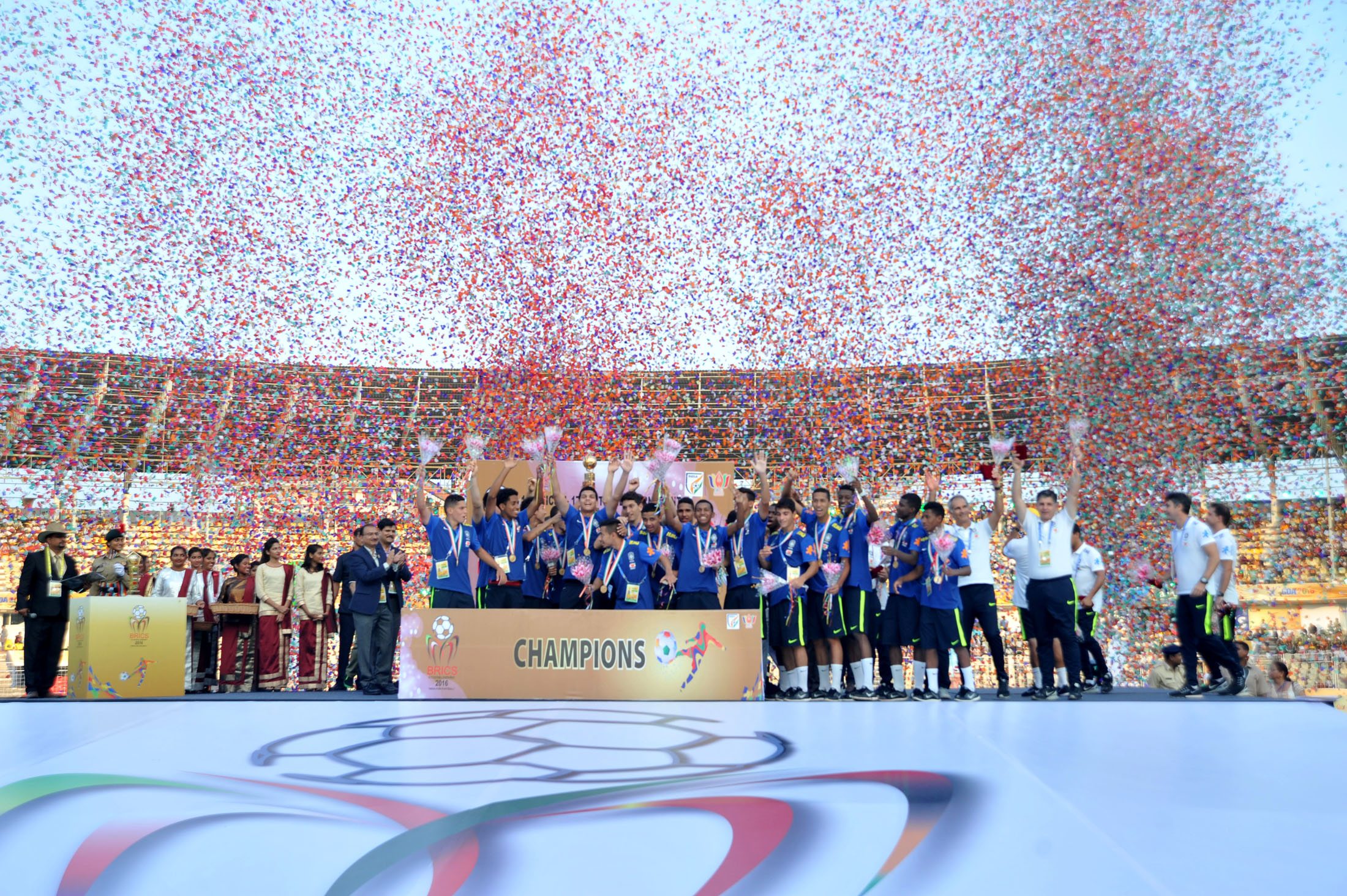
Brazilian team celebrating with the BRICS U-17 Cup trophy at the Fatorda Stadium in Goa, 2016.

- Montaigu Tournament:
  - Winners (2): 1984, 2022, 2026
- Paolo Valenti Trophy:
  - Winners: 1993
- Virginia State Youth Cup
  - Winners: 1993
- Toto Cup:
  - Winners: 2000
- Salerno Youth Tournament:
  - Winners (2): 2000, 2001
- Mundialito João Havelange:
  - Winners (2): 2000, 2002
- Three Nations Cup:
  - Winners (2): 2000, 2001
- Torneio Cidade de Canoas:
  - Winners: 2005
- Mediterranean International Cup U-16:
  - Winners: 2006
- Copa 2 de Julho:
  - Winners (4): 2009, 2010, 2013, 2025
- Nike International Friendlies:
  - Winners (2): 2014, 2017
- Suwon Cup:
  - Winners: 2015
- BRICS U-17 Football Cup:
  - Winners (2): 2016, 2018
- Caiscais Luso Cup:
  - Winners: 2024

== Managers ==
- Homero Cavalheiro (1985–1986)
- Jair Pereira (1986)
- José Teixeira (1987–1988)
- René Simões (1988)
- Homero Cavalheiro (1989)
- Júlio César Leal (1991)
- Humberto Redes (1993)
- Toninho Barroso (1995)
- Carlos César (1997–1999)
- Sérgio Farias (2001)
- Marcos Paquetá (2003)
- Nelson Rodrigues (2005)
- Edgar Pereira (2007)
- Lucho Nizzo (2007–2009)
- Émerson Ávila (2010–2011)
- Alexandre Gallo (2013)
- Caio Zanardi (2013–2015)
- Carlos Amadeu (2015–2017)
- Guilherme Dalla Déa (2018–2020)
- Phelipe Leal (2022–2023)
- Ramon Menezes (2024)
- Dudu Patetuci (2025–)

== Head-to-head record ==
The following table shows Brazil's head-to-head record in the FIFA U-17 World Cup.

Opponent	Pld	W	D	L	GF	GA	GD	Win %
Angola	1	1	0	0	2	0	+2	100.00
Argentina	3	2	0	1	5	3	+2	66.67
Australia	7	5	1	1	10	4	+6	71.43
Austria	1	1	0	0	7	0	+7	100.00
Bahrain	1	0	1	0	0	0	+0	0.00
Cameroon	1	0	1	0	1	1	+0	0.00
Canada	2	2	0	0	6	1	+5	100.00
Chile	1	1	0	0	3	2	+1	100.00
Colombia	1	1	0	0	2	0	+2	100.00
Croatia	1	1	0	0	3	1	+2	100.00
Denmark	1	1	0	0	3	0	+3	100.00
East Germany	1	1	0	0	2	1	+1	100.00
Ecuador	2	2	0	0	5	1	+4	100.00
England	4	2	0	2	5	6	−1	50.00
France	4	1	2	1	5	5	+0	25.00
Gambia	1	0	0	1	1	3	−2	0.00
Germany	7	4	1	2	17	9	+8	57.14
Ghana	5	1	1	3	7	9	−2	20.00
Guinea	2	2	0	0	7	2	+5	100.00
Honduras	3	3	0	0	13	0	+13	100.00
Hungary	1	0	0	1	0	1	−1	0.00
Indonesia	1	1	0	0	4	0	+4	100.00
Iran	1	0	0	1	2	3	−1	0.00
Italy	2	1	1	0	2	0	+2	50.00
Ivory Coast	1	0	1	0	3	3	+0	0.00
Japan	2	2	0	0	6	4	+2	100.00
Mali	2	1	1	0	2	0	+2	50.00
Morocco	1	1	0	0	2	1	+1	100.00
Mexico	5	2	1	2	5	6	−1	40.00
Netherlands	1	1	0	0	2	1	+1	100.00
New Caledonia	1	1	0	0	9	0	+9	100.00
New Zealand	3	3	0	0	11	0	+11	100.00
Niger	1	1	0	0	2	0	+2	100.00
Nigeria	1	0	0	1	0	3	−3	0.00
North Korea	3	3	0	0	11	2	+9	100.00
Oman	2	1	1	0	3	1	+2	50.00
Paraguay	2	1	1	0	4	1	+3	50.00
Portugal	2	1	1	0	5	0	+5	50.00
Qatar	2	2	0	0	8	1	+7	100.00
Russia	1	1	0	0	3	1	+2	100.00
Saudi Arabia	2	1	1	0	2	1	+1	50.00
Slovakia	1	1	0	0	6	1	+5	100.00
South Korea	1	0	0	1	0	1	−1	0.00
Spain	2	2	0	0	3	1	+2	100.00
Switzerland	1	0	0	1	0	1	−1	0.00
Sudan	1	1	0	0	1	0	+1	100.00
Trinidad and Tobago	1	1	0	0	6	1	+5	100.00
Turkey	1	1	0	0	4	3	+1	100.00
United Arab Emirates	2	2	0	0	10	1	+9	100.00
United States	3	2	0	1	6	1	+5	66.67
Uruguay	1	0	0	1	0	3	−3	0.00
Yemen	1	1	0	0	3	0	+3	100.00
Zambia	1	0	1	0	1	1	0	0.00
Total	102	66	16	20	230	91	+139	64.71

== By match ==
Year	Round	Opponent	Score	Brazil scorers
(China) 1985	Group D	Qatar	2–1	Bismarck, William
(China) 1985	Group D	Hungary	0–1	
(China) 1985	Group D	Mexico	2–0	William, Maurício
(China) 1985	Quarter-finals	Saudi Arabia	2–1	William, Natalino
(China) 1985	Semi-finals	West Germany	3–4	Bismarck, André Cruz, Natalino
(China) 1985	Match for third place	Guinea	4–1	Marques, Caio, William, André Cruz
(Canada) 1987	Group C	France	0–0	
(Canada) 1987	Group C	Saudi Arabia	0–1	
(Canada) 1987	Group C	Australia	0–0	
(Scotland) 1989	Group B	Cuba	3–0	Gilberto, Marcelo, André
(Scotland) 1989	Group B	East Germany	1–0	Marcelo
(Scotland) 1989	Group B	Australia	1–3	Marcelo
(Scotland) 1989	Quarter-finals	Bahrain	0–0 (1–4 p)	
(Italy) 1991	Group C	Germany	2–0	Yan (2)
(Italy) 1991	Group C	United Arab Emirates	4–0	Yan, Nenê, Adriano, Leandro
(Italy) 1991	Group C	Sudan	1–0	Adriano
(Italy) 1991	Quarter-finals	Ghana	1–2	Leandro
(Ecuador) 1995	Group D	Germany	3–0	Djimi, Marco Antônio, Juan
(Ecuador) 1995	Group D	Oman	0–0	
(Ecuador) 1995	Group D	Canada	2–0	Juan, Eduardo
(Ecuador) 1995	Quarter-finals	Australia	3–1	Rodrigo, Kléber, Marco Antônio
(Ecuador) 1995	Semi-finals	Argentina	3–0	Rodrigo, Rocha, Fábio
(Ecuador) 1995	Final	Ghana	2–3	Juan, Marco Antônio
(Egypt) 1997	Group C	Austria	7–0	Diogo, Fábio Pinto (2), Geovanni, Ferrugem, Matuzalém, Ronaldinho
(Egypt) 1997	Group C	United States	3–0	Jorginho, Fábio Pinto, Matuzalém
(Egypt) 1997	Group C	Oman	3–1	Jorginho, Fábio Pinto, Geovanni
(Egypt) 1997	Quarter-finals	Argentina	2–0	Fábio Pinto (2)
(Egypt) 1997	Semi-finals	Germany	4–0	Adiel, Geovanni, Ferrugem, Ronaldinho
(Egypt) 1997	Final	Ghana	2–1	Matuzalém, Andrey
(New Zealand) 1999	Group C	Australia	2–1	Marquinhos, Carlos Henrique
(New Zealand) 1999	Group C	Mali	0–0	
(New Zealand) 1999	Group C	Germany	0–0	
(New Zealand) 1999	Quarter-finals	Paraguay	4–1	Leonardo (2), Kaká, Ricardo
(New Zealand) 1999	Semi-finals	Ghana	2–2 (4–2 p)	Tetteh (o.g.), Eduardo Costa
(New Zealand) 1999	Final	Australia	0–0 (8–7 p)	
(Trinidad and Tobago) 2001	Group A	Trinidad and Tobago	6–1	Malzon (2), Bruno Moraes, Caetano (3)
(Trinidad and Tobago) 2001	Group A	Australia	2–1	Anderson, Caetano
(Trinidad and Tobago) 2001	Group A	Croatia	2–0	Anderson, Bruno Moraes
(Trinidad and Tobago) 2001	Quarter-finals	France	1–2	Alberoni
(Finland) 2003	Group C	Cameroon	1–1	Abuda
(Finland) 2003	Group C	Portugal	5–0	Léo, Abuda, Ederson, Evandro (2)
(Finland) 2003	Group C	Yemen	3–0	Evandro, Thyago, Abuda
(Finland) 2003	Quarter-finals	United States	3–0	Leonardo, Ederson, Evandro
(Finland) 2003	Semi-finals	Colombia	2–0	Abuda (2)
(Finland) 2003	Final	Spain	1–0	Leonardo
(Peru) 2005	Group D	Gambia	1–3	Igor
(Peru) 2005	Group D	Netherlands	2–1	Igor, Simões (o.g.)
(Peru) 2005	Group D	Qatar	6–0	Ramón (2), Denilson, Roberto, Renato Augusto, Anderson
(Peru) 2005	Quarter-finals	North Korea	3–1 (a.e.t.)	Ramón, Celso, Igor
(Peru) 2005	Semi-finals	Turkey	4–3	Celso, Anderson, Marcelo, Igor
(Peru) 2005	Final	Mexico	0–3	
(South Korea) 2007	Group B	New Zealand	7–0	Fabinho, Lázaro, Giuliano, Fábio, Alex Teixeira, Lulinha, Júnior
(South Korea) 2007	Group B	North Korea	6–1	Fábio (2), Alex Teixeira, Maicon, Giuliano, Lulinha
(South Korea) 2007	Group B	England	1–2	Tales
(South Korea) 2007	Round of 16	Ghana	0–1	
(Nigeria) 2009	Group B	Japan	3–2	Guilherme, Neymar, Wellington
(Nigeria) 2009	Group B	Mexico	0–1	
(Nigeria) 2009	Group B	Switzerland	0–1	
(Mexico) 2011	Group F	Denmark	3–0	Ademilson (2), Wallace
(Mexico) 2011	Group F	Australia	1–0	Adryan
(Mexico) 2011	Group F	Ivory Coast	3–3	Lucas Piazon, Ademilson (2)
(Mexico) 2011	Round of 16	Ecuador	2–0	Ademilson, Léo
(Mexico) 2011	Quarter-finals	Japan	3–2	Léo Bonatini, Ademilson, Adryan
(Mexico) 2011	Semi-finals	Uruguay	0–3	
(Mexico) 2011	Match for third place	Germany	3–4	Wellington, Adryan (2)
(United Arab Emirates) 2013	Group A	Slovakia	6–1	Mosquito (3), Nathan (2), Caio
(United Arab Emirates) 2013	Group A	United Arab Emirates	6–1	Boschilia (2), Nathan (2), Joanderson, Gabriel Barbosa
(United Arab Emirates) 2013	Group A	Honduras	3–0	Boschilia (2), Caio Rangel
(United Arab Emirates) 2013	Round of 16	Russia	3–1	Mosquito, Boschilia (2)
(United Arab Emirates) 2013	Quarter-finals	Mexico	1–1 (10–11 p)	Nathan
(Chile) 2015	Group B	South Korea	0–1	
(Chile) 2015	Group B	England	1–0	Leandrinho
(Chile) 2015	Group B	Guinea	3–1	Lincoln, Leandrinho, Arthur
(Chile) 2015	Round of 16	New Zealand	1–0	Luís Henrique
(Chile) 2015	Quarter-finals	Nigeria	0–3	
(India) 2017	Group D	Spain	2–1	Lincoln, Paulinho
(India) 2017	Group D	North Korea	2–0	Lincoln, Paulinho
(India) 2017	Group D	Niger	2–0	Lincoln, Brenner
(India) 2017	Round of 16	Honduras	3–0	Brenner (2), Marcos Antônio
(India) 2017	Quarter-finals	Germany	2–1	Weverson, Paulinho
(India) 2017	Semi-finals	England	1–3	Wesley
(India) 2017	Match for third place	Mali	2–0	Alan Souza, Yuri Alberto
(Brazil) 2019	Group A	Canada	4–1	Peglow (2), Franklin (o.g.), Gabriel Veron
(Brazil) 2019	Group A	New Zealand	3–0	Kaio Jorge, Talles Magno, Diego Rosa
(Brazil) 2019	Group A	Angola	2–0	Talles Magno, Gabriel Veron
(Brazil) 2019	Round of 16	Chile	3–2	Kaio Jorge (2), Diego
(Brazil) 2019	Quarter-finals	Italy	2–0	Patryck, Peglow
(Brazil) 2019	Semi-finals	France	3–2	Kaio Jorge, Gabriel Veron, Lázaro
(Brazil) 2019	Final	Mexico	2–1	Kaio Jorge, Lázaro
(Indonesia) 2023	Group C	Iran	2–3	Rayan, Zamani (o.g.)
(Indonesia) 2023	Group C	New Caledonia	9–0	Estêvão, Kauã Elias (3), Rayan (2), João Victor , Luighi, Vitor Reis
(Indonesia) 2023	Group C	England	2–1	Kauã Elias, Da Mata
(Indonesia) 2023	Round of 16	Ecuador	3–1	Estêvão (2),Luighi
(Indonesia) 2023	Quarter-finals	Argentina	0–3	
(Qatar) 2025	Group H	Honduras	7–0	Ruan Pablo, Dell (2), Felipe Morais, Vitor Hugo, Angelo, Gabriel Mec
(Qatar) 2025	Group H	Indonesia	4–0	Luis Eduardo, Panji (o.g.), Felipe Morais,Ruan Pablo
(Qatar) 2025	Group H	Zambia	1–1	Dell
(Qatar) 2025	Round of 32	Paraguay	0–0 (5–4 p)	
(Qatar) 2025	Round of 16	France	1–1 (4–3 p)	Tavares
(Qatar) 2025	Quarter-finals	Morocco	2–1	Dell (2)
(Qatar) 2025	Semi-finals	Portugal	0–0 (5–6 p)	
(Qatar) 2025	Match for third place	Italy	0–0 (2–4 p)	

== See also ==
- Brazil national football team
- Brazil national under-23 football team
- Brazil national under-20 football team
- Santos FC and the Brazil national football team
