= Tomás Parmo =

Footballer (born 2000)

Personal information
- Date of birth: 8 January 2008 (age 18)
- Place of birth: Buenos Aires, Argentina
- Height: 1.71 m (5 ft 7 in)
- Position: Attacking midfielder

Team information
- Current team: Independiente
- Number: 30

Youth career
- Instituto Atlético Cultural
- 2016–2024: Independiente

Senior career*
Years	Team	Apps	(Gls)
2024–	Independiente	1	(0)

International career^{‡}
2023–	Argentina U17	13	(2)
- * Club domestic league appearances and goals as of 13:26, 4 June 2024 (UTC) ‡ National team caps and goals as of 13:26, 4 June 2024 (UTC)

Tomás Parmo (born 8 January 2008) is an Argentine professional footballer who plays as an attacking midfielder for Independiente.

== Club career ==
Parmo began playing football with Instituto Atlético Cultural, before moving to Independiente in 2016 at the age of 8. On 1 February 2024, Parmo signed his first professional contract with Independiente until 2026. He made his senior and professional debut with Independiente as a late substitute in a 2–0 Copa Argentina win over Juventud Unida Universitario on 3 May 2024, their second youngest debutant ever after Sergio Agüero.

On 31 December 2025, Parmo signed a three-year contract extension with Independiente.

== International career ==
Born in Argentina, Parmo is of Italian descent and holds dual-citizenship. In August 2022, he received his first callup to the Argentina U15s. He was called up to the Argentina U17s starting in 2023.

== Personal life ==
Parmo is the son of Alejandro Parmo, a sports journalist in Argentina.
