= Ruan Pablo =

Brazilian footballer (born 2008)

Personal information
- Full name: Ruan Pablo Barbosa Sousa
- Date of birth: 23 July 2008 (age 18)
- Place of birth: Lauro de Freitas, Brazil
- Height: 1.83 m (6 ft 0 in)
- Position: Forward

Team information
- Current team: Bahia
- Number: 77

Youth career
- 2019–2026: Bahia

Senior career*
Years	Team	Apps	(Gls)
2024–	Bahia	20	(3)

International career^{‡}
2024	Brazil U15		
2025	Brazil U17	15	(5)
2026–	Brazil U20	4	(0)
- * Club domestic league appearances and goals as of 20:42, 13 November 2026 (UTC) ‡ National team caps and goals as of 20:42, 13 November 2026 (UTC)

Ruan Pablo Barbosa Sousa (born 23 July 2008), known as Ruan Pablo, is a Brazilian professional footballer who plays as a forward for Brazilian club Bahia.

== Club career ==
Born in Lauro de Freitas, Bahia, Ruan Pablo joined Bahia's youth sides in 2019. On 23 July 2024, on his 16th birthday, he signed his first professional contract with the club until July 2027, with an €200 million release clause.

On 24 July 2024, Ruan Pablo was called up to a Série A match against Atlético Goianiense. He made his professional debut hours later, coming on as a late substitute for Cauly in a 1–1 draw at the Estádio Antônio Accioly; aged 16 years and one day, he became the youngest player to debut for the club.

== Career statistics ==
As of 13 November 2026

Club	Season	League			State league		National cup		Continental		Other		Total	
Club	Season	Division	Apps	Goals	Apps	Goals	Apps	Goals	Apps	Goals	Apps	Goals	Apps	Goals
Bahia	2024	Série A	1	0	—		—		—		—		1	0
Bahia	2025	Série A	5	0	5	1	1	0	0	0	3 (Note: Appearance(s) in Copa do Nordeste)	0	14	1
Bahia	2026	Série A	4	0	5	2	0	0	0	0	—		9	2
Career total			10	0	10	3	1	0	0	0	3	0	24	3

== Honours ==
Bahia

- Campeonato Baiano: 2025, 2026
- Copa do Nordeste: 2025

Brazil U17

- South American U-17 Championship: 2025
