= Angelo (footballer, born 2008) =

Brazilian footballer

Personal information
- Full name: Angelo Henrique Candido de Siqueira
- Date of birth: 20 October 2008 (age 18)
- Place of birth: Guarulhos, Brazil
- Height: 1.81 m (5 ft 11 in)
- Position: Right-back

Team information
- Current team: São Paulo

Youth career
- 2019–: São Paulo

International career
Years	Team	Apps	(Gls)
2024	Brazil U15		
2025	Brazil U17	9	(2)

Angelo Henrique Candido de Siqueira (born 20 October 2008), sometimes known as Angelo Candido or just Angelo, is a Brazilian professional footballer who plays as a right-back for São Paulo.

== Club career ==
Born in Guarulhos, Angelo joined São Paulo's youth sector in 2019, at just 11 years old. The player began to gain greater prominence in the under-15 category in 2024, becoming the team's main highlight. In January 2025, he signed his first professional contract with the club. On 1 June, his sale to Strasbourg was announced for around €5 million, with the athlete leaving in 2027 when he turns 18.

== International career ==
Angelo was called up by coach Dudu Patetuci for the 2023 South American U-15 Championship (held in October 2024), and the 2025 South American U-17 Championship, scoring the goal in the final match against Colombia. In November 2025, he was called up again to compete in the 2025 FIFA U-17 World Cup.

== Honours ==
Brazil U17

- South American U-17 Championship: 2025
