= Luis Eduardo =

Swiss footballer (born 2005)

Personal information
- Full name: Luis Eduardo Guedes de Souza
- Date of birth: 16 January 2008 (age 18)
- Place of birth: Corrente, Brazil
- Height: 1.88 m (6 ft 2 in)
- Position: Centre-back

Team information
- Current team: Grêmio
- Number: 43

Youth career
- 2021–2026: Grêmio

Senior career*
Years	Team	Apps	(Gls)
2025–	Grêmio	2	(0)

International career^{‡}
2025	Brazil U17	13	(3)
- * Club domestic league appearances and goals as of 13:52, 15 April 2026 (UTC) ‡ National team caps and goals as of 13:52, 15 April 2026 (UTC)

Luis Eduardo Guedes de Souza (born 16 January 2008) is a Brazilian professional footballer who plays as a centre-back for Campeonato Brasileiro Série A club Grêmio.

== Club career ==
Luis Eduardo joined the academy of Grêmio in 2021 as a 13 year old, and worked his way up their youth categories. On 23 January 2024, he signed his first professional contract with the club until 2027. He made his senior debut with Grêmio as a substitute in a 1–0 Campeonato Gaúcho win over Ypiranga on 15 February 2025. On 11 June 2025, he extended his contract with the club until 2028. He was promoted to Grêmio's senior team for their winning campaign at the 2026 Campeonato Gaúcho on 29 December 2025.

== International career ==
Luis Eduardo was captain of the Brazil U17s that won the 2025 South American U-17 Championship. This earned him a spot on the U17 squad that came fourth at the 2025 FIFA U-17 World Cup.

== Honours ==
Grêmio

- Campeonato Gaúcho: 2026

Brazil U17

- South American U-17 Championship: 2025
