= Santiago Londoño =

Colombian footballer (born 2008)

Personal information
- Full name: Santiago Londoño González
- Date of birth: 29 February 2008 (age 18)
- Place of birth: Medellín, Antioquia, Colombia
- Height: 1.78 m (5 ft 10 in)
- Position: Forward

Team information
- Current team: León (on loan from Pachuca)
- Number: 21

Youth career
- Pipe Uribe
- 2016–2023: Envigado

Senior career*
Years	Team	Apps	(Gls)
2023–2025	Envigado	22	(1)
2026	Pachuca	0	(0)
2026	→ Everton (loan)	12	(1)
2026–	→ León (loan)	0	(0)

International career^{‡}
2024	Colombia U15	4	(1)
2025	Colombia U17	8	(7)
- * Club domestic league appearances and goals as of 30 August 2026 ‡ National team caps and goals as of 8 October 2025

Santiago Londoño González (born 29 February 2008) is a Colombian footballer who currently plays as a forward for Liga MX club León, on loan from Pachuca.

== Club career ==
Born in Medellín in the Antioquia Department of Colombia, Londoño began his footballing career with local side Pipe Uribe. Having played against them in a match, professional side Envigado offered him trials at the club, which he successfully passed, joining at the age of eight. During his progression through the academy, he was called up to represent the Antioquia Department for the 2022 under-13 National Championship, where Antioquia finished as runners-up.

Having won the national under-15 tournament with Envigado, scoring in the final against Deportivo Cali, Londoño was called up to the senior squad for the first time in March 2023, ahead of the Copa Colombia match against Tigres. Having started the game, he was replaced by Yilmar Celedón at half-time, as Envigado went on to lose 4–1 in a penalty shoot-out after a 0–0 draw.

In August 2025, Grupo Pachuca purchased 70% of his rights to take effect in 2026. In January 2026, he was loaned out to Chilean club Everton de Viña del Mar.

== International career ==
Londoño was called up to the Colombia national under-15 football team for two training camps in 2022. In January of the following year, he was called up to the squad again for the XXVI Mundialito Tahuichi friendly championship in Bolivia.

== Career statistics ==
=== Club ===
As of 13 July 2023

Appearances and goals by club, season and competition
Club	Season	League			Cup		Continental		Other		Total	
Club	Season	Division	Apps	Goals	Apps	Goals	Apps	Goals	Apps	Goals	Apps	Goals
Envigado	2023	Categoría Primera A	0	0	1 (Note: Appearances in the Copa Colombia)	0	–		0	0	1	0
Envigado	2024	Categoría Primera A	2	0	2	0	–		0	0	4	0
Envigado	2025	Categoría Primera A	17	1	6	2	–		0	0	23	3
Career total			19	1	9	2	0	0	0	0	28	3
