= Juan Camilo Uribe =

Colombian painter (1945–2005)

- Born: 1945; Medellín, Colombia
- Died: 2005 (aged 59–60); Medellín, Colombia
- Known for: Painting

Juan Camilo Uribe (1945-2005) was a Colombian painter. His artwork is in the collections of the Bogotá Museum of Modern Art and the Medellín Museum of Modern Art.
