= Venezuela national under-17 football team =

National association football team

Venezuela
- Association: Federación Venezolana de Fútbol
- Confederation: CONMEBOL (South America)
- Head coach: Jhonny Ferreira
- Captain: David Martínez
- Home stadium: Estadio Polideportivo de Pueblo Nuevo; Estadio José Pachencho Romero; Estadio José Antonio Anzoátegui
- FIFA code: VEN
First colours	Second colours

FIFA U-17 World Cup
- Appearances: 3 (first in 2013)
- Best result: Round of 16 (2023)

South American U-17 Championship
- Appearances: 20 (first in 1985)
- Best result: Runners-up (2013)

The Venezuela national under-17 football team represents Venezuela in international men's under-17 football competitions and is controlled by the Venezuelan Football Federation.

== Competitive record ==
=== FIFA U-17 World Cup ===
FIFA U-17 World Cup record
Year	Round	Position	GP	W	D*	L	GS	GA
(China) 1985	Did not qualify							
(Canada) 1987	Did not qualify							
(Scotland) 1989	Did not qualify							
(Italy) 1991	Did not qualify							
(Japan) 1993	Did not qualify							
(Ecuador) 1995	Did not qualify							
(Egypt) 1997	Did not qualify							
(New Zealand) 1999	Did not qualify							
(Trinidad and Tobago) 2001	Did not qualify							
(Finland) 2003	Did not qualify							
(Peru) 2005	Did not qualify							
(South Korea) 2007	Did not qualify							
(Nigeria) 2009	Did not qualify							
(Mexico) 2011	Did not qualify							
(United Arab Emirates) 2013	Group Stage	21st	3	0	0	3	2	9
(Chile) 2015	Did not qualify							
(India) 2017	Did not qualify							
(Brazil) 2019	Did not qualify							
(Indonesia) 2023	Round of 16	16th	4	1	1	2	5	10
(Qatar) 2025	Round of 32	21st	4	2	1	1	9	5
(Qatar) 2026	In progress	TBD	1	1	0	0	2	1
Total:4/21	Round of 16	16th	12	4	2	6	18	25

=== CONMEBOL Sub17 ===
CONMEBOL Sub17 record
Year	Round	Position	GP	W	D*	L	GS	GA
(Argentina) 1985	Round-robin	9th	8	0	2	6	2	24
(Peru) 1986	Group Stage	9th	4	0	2	2	2	6
(Ecuador) 1988	Group Stage	10th	4	0	0	4	1	11
(Paraguay) 1991	Group Stage	10th	4	0	0	4	0	8
(Colombia) 1993	Group Stage	9th	4	0	1	3	2	8
(Peru) 1995	Group Stage	10th	3	0	1	2	4	14
(Paraguay) 1997	Group Stage	6th	4	2	0	2	3	9
(Uruguay) 1999	Group Stage	10th	4	0	0	4	3	14
(Peru) 2001	Fourth Place	4th	7	2	2	3	10	17
(Bolivia) 2003	Group Stage	8th	4	1	0	3	5	12
(Venezuela) 2005	Group Stage	10th	4	0	0	4	5	18
(Ecuador) 2007	Fifth Place	5th	9	2	3	4	9	20
(Chile) 2009	Group Stage	10th	4	0	1	3	1	6
(Ecuador) 2011	Group Stage	10th	4	0	0	4	5	10
(Argentina) 2013	Runners-up	2nd	9	3	5	1	8	8
(Paraguay) 2015	Group Stage	7th	4	1	2	1	8	8
(Chile) 2017	Fifth Place	5th	9	3	2	4	11	15
(Peru) 2019	Group Stage	7th	4	1	2	1	6	7
(Ecuador) 2023	Fourth Place	4th	9	3	3	3	12	10
(Colombia) 2025	Third Place	3rd	6	3	1	2	9	8
Total	20/20	0 Titles	108	21	26	60	106	233

*Draws include knockout matches decided on penalty kicks.

== Honours ==
- CONMEBOL Sub17
  - Runners-up (1): 2013
  - Third Place (1): 2025
- Bolivarian Games
  - Silver medal (1): 2005
  - Bronze medal (5): 1993, 1997, 2001, 2009, 2017

== Current squad ==
The following players were called up to the squad for the 2026 South American U-17 Championship to be played 3–19 April 2026 in Paraguay.

Caps and goals are correct as of 18 April 2026, after the match against Bolivia.

No.	Pos.	Player	Date of birth (age)	Caps	Goals	Club
1	GK	Sebastián Angulo	22 January 2009 (age 17)	9	0	(Venezuelan Football Federation) Academia Puerto Cabello
12	GK	Daniel Cabrera	16 March 2009 (age 17)	1	0	(Venezuelan Football Federation) Caracas
23	GK	Víctor Rodríguez	11 April 2009 (age 17)	0	0	(Venezuelan Football Federation) Deportivo Rayo Zuliano
2	DF	Kendys Jiménez	7 February 2009 (age 17)	6	0	(Venezuelan Football Federation) Universidad Central
3	DF	Diego Sanchez	30 November 2009 (age 16)	3	0	(Venezuelan Football Federation) Deportivo La Guaira
4	DF	Enmanuel Brito	25 February 2009 (age 17)	9	0	(Venezuelan Football Federation) Monagas
6	DF	Ángel López	17 February 2010 (age 16)	10	0	(Venezuelan Football Federation) Caracas
13	DF	Ángel Mota	28 April 2009 (age 17)	8	0	(Venezuelan Football Federation) Monagas
14	DF	Andrew Rasquín	20 February 2009 (age 17)	4	0	(Venezuelan Football Federation) Metropolitanos
15	DF	Alessandro Boada	21 January 2009 (age 17)	3	0	(Venezuelan Football Federation) Metropolitanos
18	DF	Diego López	11 June 2009 (age 17)	5	0	(Royal Spanish Football Federation) Celta Vigo
5	MF	Piero García	19 March 2009 (age 17)	8	0	(Venezuelan Football Federation) Caracas
7	MF	Gregory Molina	1 June 2009 (age 17)	7	1	(Venezuelan Football Federation) Carabobo
8	MF	Román Lozada	31 January 2009 (age 17)	18	3	(Argentine Football Association) Vélez Sarsfield
16	MF	Marco Riera	10 March 2010 (age 16)	4	0	(Venezuelan Football Federation) Monagas
20	MF	Kevin Guzmán	28 July 2009 (age 17)	2	0	(Venezuelan Football Federation) Universidad Central
9	FW	Luis Flores	2 February 2009 (age 17)	3	0	(Venezuelan Football Federation) Metropolitanos
10	FW	Junior Araujo	11 June 2009 (age 17)	6	0	(Venezuelan Football Federation) Universidad Central
11	FW	José Gamboa	28 May 2010 (age 16)	10	4	(Venezuelan Football Federation) Caracas
17	FW	Andy Saavedra	9 January 2009 (age 17)	12	2	(Venezuelan Football Federation) Caracas
19	FW	Jesús Barrios	17 August 2009 (age 17)	3	1	(Venezuelan Football Federation) Deportivo Rayo Zuliano
21	FW	Sebastían Azuaje	24 May 2009 (age 17)	4	0	(Venezuelan Football Federation) Caracas
22	FW	Santiago Sánchez	22 April 2009 (age 17)	3	1	(Venezuelan Football Federation) Carabobo

== Head-to-head record ==
The following table shows Venezuela's head-to-head record in the FIFA U-17 World Cup.

Opponent	Pld	W	D	L	GF	GA	GD	Win %
Argentina	1	0	0	1	0	5	−5	0.00
Germany	1	0	0	1	0	3	−3	0.00
Japan	1	0	0	1	1	3	−2	0.00
Mexico	1	0	1	0	2	2	+0	0.00
New Zealand	1	1	0	0	3	0	+3	100.00
Russia	1	0	0	1	0	4	−4	0.00
Tunisia	1	0	0	1	1	2	−1	0.00
Total	7	1	1	5	7	19	−12	14.29

== See also ==
- Venezuela national under-23 football team
- Venezuela national under-20 football team
- Venezuela national football team
- Venezuela national futsal team
