= 2026 FIFA U-17 World Cup =

International football competition

كأس العالم تحت 17 سنة قطر 2026

Tournament details
- Host country: Qatar
- Dates: 19 November – 13 December
- Teams: 48 (from 6 confederations)
- Venues: 2 (in 1 host city)

Tournament statistics
- Matches played: 32
- Goals scored: 106 (3.31 per match)
- Attendance: 0 (0 per match)
- Top scorer(s): (South Korea) Kim Ji-woo (4 goals)
- All statistics correct as of 22 November 2026.

The 2026 FIFA U-17 World Cup is the 21st edition of the FIFA U-17 World Cup, the annual international men's youth football tournament contested by the under-17 national teams of the member associations of FIFA. It is being held in Qatar in November. This edition is the second edition of the annual cycle adopted by FIFA for the U-17 World Cup as well as the second to be played in a 48-team format (previously, held as a biennial 24-team tournament). As part of these changes, FIFA also granted Qatar the hosting rights for the tournament for a five-year period from 2025 to 2029.

Portugal were the defending champions, having won their first title in 2025, but failed to qualify for this year's edition and are thus unable to defend the title. Portugal became the first title holders since England in 2019 that failed to qualify for the subsequent tournament.

== Host selection ==
On 15 November 2023, FIFA launched a global call for expressions of interest from member associations to host the next five editions of the U17 World Cup (2025–2029) as a single consolidated package. Member associations had to express their interest no later than 4 December 2023.

After a FIFA Council meeting held on 14 March 2024, it was announced that Qatar would host the next five editions of the U-17 World Cup (2025–2029), as part of the new annual cycle implemented by FIFA for the tournament. This was the first time that Qatar hosted the FIFA U-17 World Cup and the third time that the tournament was held in the Arab world.

== Venues ==
All matches will be held in the city of Al Rayyan inside the "Aspire Zone" sports complex, with the exception of the final, which will take place at Ahmad bin Ali Stadium. The eight pitches to be used were named after eight former Qatar national football team players; Mohammed Ghanim (pitch 1), Ibrahim Khalfan (pitch 2), Badr Bilal (pitch 3), Khalid Salman (pitch 4), Khaled Ballan (pitch 5), Mansour Muftah (pitch 7), Mahmoud Soufi (pitch 8), and Adel Ahmed Malalla (pitch 9), the same as the 2025 tournament.

Location of the host city of the FIFA U-17 World Cup Qatar 2026.

- 1 Al Rayyan

2026 FIFA U-17 World Cup venues
Al Rayyan
| Ahmad bin Ali Stadium | Aspire Zone |
| Ahmad bin Ali Stadium | 8 pitches |
| Capacity: 45,032 | 8 pitches |

== Teams ==
=== Qualification ===
Teams qualified Teams failed to qualify Teams withdrew or suspended Did not enter Not a FIFA member

A total of 48 teams qualified for the final tournament. In addition to Qatar, who qualified automatically as the host nation, the other 47 teams qualified from six separate continental competitions. The slot allocation per confederation was approved by the FIFA Council meeting held on 15 May 2024:

- AFC (Asia): 9 (including the hosts Qatar)
- CAF (Africa): 10
- CONCACAF (North America, Central America and the Caribbean): 8
- CONMEBOL (South America): 7
- OFC (Oceania): 3
- UEFA (Europe): 11

Dominican Republic, Greece, Montenegro, Mozambique, Romania, Serbia, Tanzania, and Vietnam will make their debut in the U-17 World Cup. Tanzania will make their first appearance in a FIFA men's tournament; Montenegro will make their first appearance in any FIFA tournament, while Mozambique will take part in their first 11-a-side FIFA football tournament, having taken part in World Cups in beach soccer and Futsal. Greece, Montenegro, Romania, and Serbia may have withdrawn from the tournament if UEFA's indefinite boycott of all FIFA competitions over the FIFA Forward Enterprise proposal had continued; the boycott was lifted on the 27th of August 2026.

Cuba qualified for its first U-17 World Cup since 1991; Algeria returned after their debut in 2009, while Denmark and Jamaica qualified for their first since 2011. Uruguay made a return after last qualifying in 2013. Australia and Cameroon made returns for the first time since 2019. China will make a first appearance since 2005, which is also the country's first FIFA men's football tournament appearance at any level since then. Ecuador and Spain made a return after missing out in 2025.

Both of the 2025 finalists, champions Portugal and runners-up Austria, failed to qualify, as did Bolivia, Burkina Faso, Canada, the Czech Republic, El Salvador, 2017 winners England, 2023 winners Germany, 2023 hosts Indonesia, Paraguay, South Africa, 2009 winners Switzerland, Tunisia, the United Arab Emirates, and Zambia, having all qualified the previous time. North Korea and United States withdrew, having appeared at the 2025 edition. Record champions Nigeria did not qualify for the third consecutive tournament.

=== Teams replaced ===
The United States withdrew on 11 November 2026, citing security concerns. The following day, the Bureau of the Youth Boys' Competitions Committee decided that the Dominican Republic would play as a replacement team.

| Qualifying tournament | Team | Qualification date | Appearance(s) | | | | Previous best performance (Note: Bold text indicates they hosted that edition.) |
| Qualifying tournament | Team | Qualification date | Total | First | Last | Streak | Previous best performance |
|---|---|---|---|---|---|---|---|
| Host nation | Qatar | 14 March 2024 | 9th | 1985 | 2025 | 2 | Fourth place (1991) |
| 2026 AFC U-17 Asian Cup | Saudi Arabia | 9 May 2026 | 5th | 1985 | 2025 | 2 | Champions (1989) |
| 2026 AFC U-17 Asian Cup | Tajikistan | 9 May 2026 | 4th | 2007 | 2025 | 2 | Round of 16 (2007) |
| 2026 AFC U-17 Asian Cup | Australia | 10 May 2026 | 14th | 1985 | 2019 | 1 | Runners-up (1999) |
| 2026 AFC U-17 Asian Cup | Uzbekistan | 10 May 2026 | 5th | 2011 | 2025 | 3 | Quarter-finals (2011, 2023) |
| 2026 AFC U-17 Asian Cup | China | 12 May 2026 | 7th | 1985 | 2005 | 1 | Quarter-finals (1985, 2005) |
| 2026 AFC U-17 Asian Cup | Japan | 12 May 2026 | 12th | 1993 | 2025 | 5 | Quarter-finals (1993, 2011, 2025) |
| 2026 AFC U-17 Asian Cup | South Korea | 13 May 2026 | 9th | 1987 | 2025 | 4 | Quarter-finals (1987, 2009, 2019) |
| 2026 AFC U-17 Asian Cup | Vietnam | 13 May 2026 | 1st | Debut | | | |
| 2026 U-17 Africa Cup of Nations | Tanzania | 17 May 2026 | 1st | Debut | | | |
| 2026 U-17 Africa Cup of Nations | Cameroon | 19 May 2026 | 3rd | 2003 | 2019 | 1 | Group stage (2003, 2019) |
| 2026 U-17 Africa Cup of Nations | Egypt | 19 May 2026 | 4th | 1987 | 2025 | 2 | Quarter-finals (1997) |
| 2026 U-17 Africa Cup of Nations | Ivory Coast | 19 May 2026 | 6th | 1987 | 2025 | 2 | Third place (1987) |
| 2026 U-17 Africa Cup of Nations | Morocco | 19 May 2026 | 4th | 2013 | 2025 | 2 | Quarter-finals (2023, 2025) |
| 2026 U-17 Africa Cup of Nations | Algeria | 20 May 2026 | 2nd | 2009 | | 1 | Group stage (2009) |
| 2026 U-17 Africa Cup of Nations | Mali | 20 May 2026 | 8th | 1997 | 2025 | 3 | Runners-up (2015) |
| 2026 U-17 Africa Cup of Nations | Senegal | 20 May 2026 | 4th | 2019 | 2025 | 4 | Round of 16 (2019, 2023) |
| 2026 U-17 Africa Cup of Nations | Mozambique | 23 May 2026 | 1st | Debut | | | |
| 2026 U-17 Africa Cup of Nations | Uganda | 23 May 2026 | 2nd | 2025 | | 2 | Round of 16 (2025) |
| 2026 CONCACAF U-17 World Cup qualification | Costa Rica | 10 February 2026 | 12th | 1985 | 2025 | 2 | Quarter-finals (2001, 2003, 2005, 2015) |
| 2026 CONCACAF U-17 World Cup qualification | Haiti | 10 February 2026 | 4th | 2007 | 2025 | 2 | Group stage (2007, 2019, 2025) |
| 2026 CONCACAF U-17 World Cup qualification | Panama | 10 February 2026 | 5th | 2011 | 2025 | 3 | Round of 16 (2011) |
| 2026 CONCACAF U-17 World Cup qualification | ~~United States~~ | 10 February 2026 | 20th | 1985 | 2025 | 6 | Fourth place (1999) |
| 2026 CONCACAF U-17 World Cup qualification | Cuba | 11 February 2026 | 3rd | 1989 | 1991 | 1 | Group stage (1989, 1991) |
| 2026 CONCACAF U-17 World Cup qualification | Honduras | 11 February 2026 | 7th | 2007 | 2025 | 2 | Quarter-finals (2013) |
| 2026 CONCACAF U-17 World Cup qualification | Jamaica | 11 February 2026 | 3rd | 1999 | 2011 | 1 | Group stage (1999, 2011) |
| 2026 CONCACAF U-17 World Cup qualification | Mexico | 12 February 2026 | 17th | 1985 | 2025 | 9 | Champions (2005, 2011) |
| 2026 CONCACAF U-17 World Cup qualification | Dominican Republic | 12 November 2026 (Note: replaced the United States team who withdrew) | 1st | Debut | | | |
| 2026 South American U-17 Championship | Brazil | 10 April 2026 | 20th | 1985 | 2025 | 16 | Champions (1997, 1999, 2003, 2019) |
| 2026 South American U-17 Championship | Argentina | 12 April 2026 | 17th | 1985 | 2025 | 4 | Third place (1991, 1995, 2003) |
| 2026 South American U-17 Championship | Colombia | 12 April 2026 | 8th | 1989 | 2025 | 2 | Fourth place (2003, 2009) |
| 2026 South American U-17 Championship | Ecuador | 12 April 2026 | 7th | 1995 | 2023 | 1 | Quarter-finals (1995, 2015) |
| 2026 South American U-17 Championship | Chile | 16 April 2026 | 7th | 1993 | 2025 | 2 | Third place (1993) |
| 2026 South American U-17 Championship | Uruguay | 16 April 2026 | 7th | 1991 | 2013 | 1 | Runners-up (2011) |
| 2026 South American U-17 Championship | Venezuela | 18 April 2026 | 4th | 2013 | 2025 | 3 | Round of 16 (2023) |
| 2025 OFC U-16 Men's Championship | New Caledonia | 27 August 2025 | 4th | 2017 | 2025 | 3 | Group stage (2017, 2023, 2025) |
| 2025 OFC U-16 Men's Championship | New Zealand | 27 August 2025 | 12th | 1997 | 2025 | 10 | Round of 16 (2009, 2011, 2015) |
| 2025 OFC U-16 Men's Championship | Fiji | 30 August 2025 | 2nd | 2025 | | 2 | Group stage (2025) |
| 2026 UEFA U-17 Euro qualification | Spain | 21 March 2026 | 12th | 1991 | 2023 | 1 | Runners-up (1991, 2003, 2007, 2017) |
| 2026 UEFA U-17 Euro qualification | Belgium | 28 March 2026 | 4th | 2007 | 2025 | 2 | Third place (2015) |
| 2026 UEFA U-17 Euro qualification | Montenegro | 28 March 2026 | 1st | Debut | | | |
| 2026 UEFA U-17 Euro qualification | Croatia | 31 March 2026 | 5th | 2001 | 2025 | 2 | Quarter-finals (2015) |
| 2026 UEFA U-17 Euro qualification | Denmark | 31 March 2026 | 2nd | 2011 | | 1 | Group stage (2011) |
| 2026 UEFA U-17 Euro qualification | France | 31 March 2026 | 10th | 1987 | 2025 | 6 | Champions (2001) |
| 2026 UEFA U-17 Euro qualification | Greece | 31 March 2026 | 1st | Debut | | | |
| 2026 UEFA U-17 Euro qualification | Italy | 31 March 2026 | 10th | 1985 | 2025 | 2 | Third place (2025) |
| 2026 UEFA U-17 Euro qualification | Republic of Ireland | 31 March 2026 | 2nd | 2025 | | 2 | Round of 16 (2025) |
| 2026 UEFA U-17 Euro qualification | Romania | 31 March 2026 | 1st | Debut | | | |
| 2026 UEFA U-17 Euro qualification | Serbia | 31 March 2026 | 1st | Debut | | | |

=== Squads ===
Players born between 1 January 2009 and 31 December 2011 are eligible to compete in the tournament. Each team has to register a squad of 21 players, minimum three of whom have to be goalkeepers (regulation article 26.1). The final squads were confirmed by FIFA on 11 November 2026.

== Seeding ==
The 48 teams were drawn into twelve groups of four teams. The hosts, Qatar, were automatically seeded to Pot 1 and into the first position of Group A, while the remaining teams were seeded into pots based on their results in the last five FIFA U-17 World Cups (with more recent tournaments weighted more heavily, using a points-based ranking system as outlined by FIFA).

| Pot | Team | Confederation | 2015 | 2017 | 2019 | 2023 | 2025 | Total points |
| Pot | Team | Confederation | Points (20%) | Points (40%) | Points (60%) | Points (80%) | Points (100%) | Total points |
|---|---|---|---|---|---|---|---|---|
| 1 | Qatar **(H)** | AFC | Host nation, automatically assigned to Pot 1 | | | | | |
| 1 | Brazil | CONMEBOL | 1.8 | 7.2 | 12.6 | 7.2 | 14 | 42.8 |
| 1 | France | UEFA | 2 | 3.6 | 10.8 | 13.6 | 8 | 38 |
| 1 | Mali | CAF | 3.2 | 4.8 | DNQ | 12 | 9 | 29 |
| 1 | Argentina | CONMEBOL | 0 | DNQ | 4.2 | 10.4 | 10 | 24.6 |
| 1 | Italy | UEFA | DNQ | DNQ | 5.4 | DNQ | 19 | 24.4 |
| 1 | Japan | AFC | DNQ | 2 | 4.2 | 4.8 | 11 | 22 |
| 1 | Spain | UEFA | DNQ | 6 | 6 | 8 | DNQ | 20 |
| 1 | United States | CONCACAF | 0.2 | 3.6 | 0.6 | 4.8 | 10 | 19.2 |
| 1 | Mexico | CONCACAF | 2.6 | 0.8 | 6.6 | 3.2 | 4 | 17.2 |
| 1 | Senegal | CAF | DNQ | DNQ | 3.6 | 5.6 | 7 | 16.2 |
| 1 | South Korea | AFC | 1.4 | DNQ | 5.4 | 0 | 7 | 13.8 |
| 2 | Morocco | CAF | DNQ | DNQ | DNQ | 5.6 | 7 | 12.6 |
| 2 | Uzbekistan | AFC | DNQ | DNQ | DNQ | 5.6 | 7 | 12.6 |
| 2 | Venezuela | CONMEBOL | DNQ | DNQ | DNQ | 3.2 | 7 | 10.2 |
| 2 | Croatia | UEFA | 1.6 | DNQ | DNQ | DNQ | 8 | 9.6 |
| 2 | Ecuador | CONMEBOL | 1.8 | DNQ | 3.6 | 4 | DNQ | 9.4 |
| 2 | Belgium | UEFA | 2.6 | DNQ | DNQ | DNQ | 6 | 8.6 |
| 2 | Republic of Ireland | UEFA | DNQ | DNQ | DNQ | DNQ | 8 | 8 |
| 2 | Colombia | CONMEBOL | DNQ | 2.4 | DNQ | DNQ | 5 | 7.4 |
| 2 | Chile | CONMEBOL | 0.8 | 0.4 | 1.8 | DNQ | 4 | 7 |
| 2 | Egypt | CAF | DNQ | DNQ | DNQ | DNQ | 4 | 4 |
| 2 | Australia | AFC | 0.8 | DNQ | 2.4 | DNQ | DNQ | 3.2 |
| 2 | Saudi Arabia | AFC | DNQ | DNQ | DNQ | DNQ | 3 | 3 |
| 3 | New Zealand | OFC | 0.8 | 0.4 | 1.8 | 0 | 0 | 3 |
| 3 | Costa Rica | CONCACAF | 1 | 0.4 | DNQ | DNQ | 1 | 2.4 |
| 3 | Tajikistan | AFC | DNQ | DNQ | 1.8 | DNQ | 0 | 1.8 |
| 3 | Panama | CONCACAF | DNQ | DNQ | DNQ | 1.6 | 0 | 1.6 |
| 3 | New Caledonia | OFC | DNQ | 0.4 | DNQ | 0 | 1 | 1.4 |
| 3 | Honduras | CONCACAF | 0 | 1.2 | DNQ | DNQ | 0 | 1.2 |
| 3 | Haiti | CONCACAF | DNQ | DNQ | 0 | DNQ | 0 | 0 |
| 3 | Ivory Coast | CAF | DNQ | DNQ | DNQ | DNQ | 0 | 0 |
| 3 | Fiji | OFC | DNQ | DNQ | DNQ | DNQ | 0 | 0 |
| 3 | Cameroon | CAF | DNQ | DNQ | 0 | DNQ | DNQ | 0 |
| 3 | Denmark | UEFA | DNQ | DNQ | DNQ | DNQ | DNQ | 0 |
| 3 | Montenegro | UEFA | DNQ | DNQ | DNQ | DNQ | DNQ | 0 |
| 4 | Serbia | UEFA | DNQ | DNQ | DNQ | DNQ | DNQ | 0 |
| 4 | Romania | UEFA | DNQ | DNQ | DNQ | DNQ | DNQ | 0 |
| 4 | Greece | UEFA | DNQ | DNQ | DNQ | DNQ | DNQ | 0 |
| 4 | Uruguay | CONMEBOL | DNQ | DNQ | DNQ | DNQ | DNQ | 0 |
| 4 | Tanzania | CAF | DNQ | DNQ | DNQ | DNQ | DNQ | 0 |
| 4 | Algeria | CAF | DNQ | DNQ | DNQ | DNQ | DNQ | 0 |
| 4 | Vietnam | AFC | DNQ | DNQ | DNQ | DNQ | DNQ | 0 |
| 4 | China | AFC | DNQ | DNQ | DNQ | DNQ | DNQ | 0 |
| 4 | Jamaica | CONCACAF | DNQ | DNQ | DNQ | DNQ | DNQ | 0 |
| 4 | Cuba | CONCACAF | DNQ | DNQ | DNQ | DNQ | DNQ | 0 |
| 4 | Mozambique (Note: The winners of the CAF playoffs were not known at the time of the draw.) | CAF | DNQ | DNQ | DNQ | DNQ | DNQ | 0 |
| 4 | Uganda | CAF | DNQ | DNQ | DNQ | DNQ | 8 | 8 |

== Draw ==
The draw took place on 21 May 2026 in Zurich, Switzerland.

Group A
| Pos | Team |
|---|---|
| A1 | Qatar (H) |
| A2 | Panama |
| A3 | Egypt |
| A4 | Greece |

Group B
| Pos | Team |
|---|---|
| B1 | South Korea |
| B2 | Uganda |
| B3 | New Caledonia |
| B4 | Ecuador |

Group C
| Pos | Team |
|---|---|
| C1 | Argentina |
| C2 | Australia |
| C3 | Mozambique |
| C4 | Denmark |

Group D
| Pos | Team |
|---|---|
| D1 | France |
| D2 | Haiti |
| D3 | Saudi Arabia |
| D4 | Uruguay |

Group E
| Pos | Team |
|---|---|
| E1 | Italy |
| E2 | Jamaica |
| E3 | Ivory Coast |
| E4 | Uzbekistan |

Group F
| Pos | Team |
|---|---|
| F1 | Senegal |
| F2 | Croatia |
| F3 | Cuba |
| F4 | Tajikistan |

Group G
| Pos | Team |
|---|---|
| G1 | Mali |
| G2 | New Zealand |
| G3 | Belgium |
| G4 | Vietnam |

Group H
| Pos | Team |
|---|---|
| H1 | Spain |
| H2 | China |
| H3 | Fiji |
| H4 | Morocco |

Group I
| Pos | Team |
|---|---|
| I1 | Brazil |
| I2 | Republic of Ireland |
| I3 | Tanzania |
| I4 | Costa Rica |

Group J
| Pos | Team |
|---|---|
| J1 | Dominican Republic |
| J2 | Montenegro |
| J3 | Chile |
| J4 | Algeria |

Group K
| Pos | Team |
|---|---|
| K1 | Mexico |
| K2 | Romania |
| K3 | Cameroon |
| K4 | Venezuela |

Group L
| Pos | Team |
|---|---|
| L1 | Japan |
| L2 | Colombia |
| L3 | Serbia |
| L4 | Honduras |

== Match officials ==
On 22 September 2026, FIFA confirmed that a total of 81 match officials have been appointed for the competition, comprising 27 referees and 54 assistant referees.

| Confederation | Referee | Assistant referees |
|---|---|---|
| AFC | (Saudi Arabia) Sami Al-Ismail | (Saudi Arabia) Saad Al-Subaie (Saudi Arabia) Omar Al-Jamal |
| AFC | (Qatar) Abdulhadi Al-Ruaile | (Qatar) Yousuf Al-Shamari (Qatar) Zahy Al-Shammari |
| AFC | (United Arab Emirates) Ahmed Darwish | (United Arab Emirates) Sabeil Yasser (United Arab Emirates) Abdalla Amir |
| AFC | (China) Du Jianxin | (China) Luo Zheng (China) Liu Zongqi |
| AFC | (Uzbekistan) Asker Nadjafaliev | (Uzbekistan) Bakhtiyorkhuja Shavkatov (Uzbekistan) Avazbek Abdullayev |
| CAF | (Nigeria) Kasimu Abdulsalam | (Ivory Coast) Wenceslas Ettien (Rwanda) Emmanuel Habumugisha |
| CAF | (Morocco) Mohamed El-Baroudi | (Morocco) Abdessamad Abertoune (Algeria) Yacine Ouerd Benslama |
| CAF | (Cameroon) Willy Ngah | (Democratic Republic of the Congo) Guylain Ngila (Cameroon) Vincent Nkemazem |
| CAF | (Senegal) Elhadji Amadou Sy | (Republic of the Congo) Vital Mapangoulou (Burkina Faso) Dofinte Lamien |
| CONCACAF | (Mexico) Ismael López Peñuelas | (Mexico) Jonathan Gómez (Mexico) Leonardo Castillo |
| CONCACAF | (Panama) Fernando Morón | (Panama) Andrés Vargas (Panama) Alejandro Camarena |
| CONCACAF | (Costa Rica) Josué Ugalde | (Costa Rica) Félix Quesada (Costa Rica) Danny Sojo |
| CONCACAF | (Canada) Michael Venne | (Canada) Twayne Anderson (United States) Jose da Silva |
| CONMEBOL | (Paraguay) Derlis Benítez | (Paraguay) José Villagra (Paraguay) Luis Onieva |
| CONMEBOL | (Ecuador) Oswaldo Contreras | (Ecuador) Juan Aguiar (Ecuador) Mauricio Lozada |
| CONMEBOL | (Uruguay) Mathias de Armas | (Uruguay) Pablo Llarena (Uruguay) Mathias Muñiz |
| CONMEBOL | (Colombia) Jairo Mayorga | (Colombia) Cristian Aguirre (Colombia) David Fuentes |
| CONMEBOL | (Brazil) Daiane Muniz | (Brazil) Leila Cruz (Brazil) Maíra Moreira |
| CONMEBOL | (Argentina) Sebastián Zunino | (Argentina) Pablo Acevedo (Argentina) Juan Mamani |
| OFC | (New Zealand) Calvin Berg | (Samoa) Malaetala Salanoa (Vanuatu) Jeremy Garae |
| UEFA | (France) Willy Delajod | (France) Erwan Finjean (France) Alexis Auger |
| UEFA | (Bulgaria) Radoslav Gidzhenov | (Bulgaria) Petar Mitrev (Bulgaria) Tudor Vukov |
| UEFA | (Croatia) Patrik Kolarić | (Croatia) Luka Pajić (Croatia) Ivan Starčević |
| UEFA | (Azerbaijan) Elçin Məsiyev | (Azerbaijan) Elşad Abdullayev (Azerbaijan) Pərvin Talıbov |
| UEFA | (Serbia) Miloš Milanović | (Serbia) Milan Pašajlić (Serbia) Nikola Djorovic |
| UEFA | (Spain) Olatz Rivera Olmedo | (Spain) Eliana Fernández (Spain) Iragartze Fernández |
| UEFA | (Poland) Damian Sylwestrzak | (Poland) Adam Karasewicz (Poland) Bartosz Heinig |

== Group stage ==
=== Tiebreakers ===
Tie-breaking criteria for group play
The ranking of teams in the group stage was determined as follows:
1. Points obtained in all group matches (three points for a win, one for a draw, none for a defeat);
2. Points obtained in the matches played between the teams in question;
3. Goal difference in the matches played between the teams in question;
4. Number of goals scored in the matches played between the teams in question;
5. Goal difference in all group matches;
6. Number of goals scored in all group matches;
7. Fair play points in all group matches (only one deduction could be applied to a player in a single match):
  - Yellow card: −1 points;
  - Indirect red card (second yellow card): −3 points;
  - Direct red card: −4 points;
  - Yellow card and direct red card: −5 points;
8. Drawing of lots.

=== Group A ===
| Pos | Team | Pld | W | D | L | GF | GA | GD | Pts | Qualification |
|---|---|---|---|---|---|---|---|---|---|---|
| 1 | Greece | 2 | 2 | 0 | 0 | 4 | 2 | +2 | 6 | Knockout stage |
| 2 | Egypt | 2 | 1 | 0 | 1 | 3 | 2 | +1 | 3 (Note: Points obtained in the matches played between the teams in question: Egypt 3, Qatar 0) | Knockout stage |
| 3 | Qatar (H) | 2 | 1 | 0 | 1 | 2 | 2 | 0 | 3 | Possible knockout stage |
| 4 | Panama | 2 | 0 | 0 | 2 | 1 | 4 | −3 | 0 | |

Updated to match(es) played on 22 November 2026. Source: FIFA
Rules for classification: Group stage tiebreakers
(H) Hosts
Notes:
19 November 2026
18:30

| Qatar | 2–0 | Panama |
|---|---|---|
| Nassir 90+1' (pen.); Ndiaye 90+5' | Report |

Aspire Zone (Pitch 2), Al Rayyan
Referee: Damian Sylwestrzak (Poland)
19 November 2026
19:00

| Egypt | 1–2 | Greece |
|---|---|---|
| Saoudi 71' | Report | Souvlatzis 54'; Karangelis 62' |

Aspire Zone (Pitch 7), Al Rayyan
Referee: Ismael López Peñuelas (Mexico)

22 November 2026
15:30

| Greece | 2–1 | Panama |
|---|---|---|
| Siozios 39'; Papasarafianos 90+5' | Report | López 84' |

Aspire Zone (Pitch 9), Al Rayyan
Referee: Du Jianxin (China)
22 November 2026
18:00

| Qatar | 0–2 | Egypt |
|---|---|---|
| | Report | Safwat 2'; Mokhtar 33' |

Aspire Zone (Pitch 2), Al Rayyan
Referee: Miloš Milanović (Serbia)

25 November 2026
17:30

| Greece | v | Qatar |
|---|---|---|
| | Report |

Aspire Zone (Pitch 2), Al Rayyan
25 November 2026
17:30

| Panama | v | Egypt |
|---|---|---|
| | Report |

Aspire Zone (Pitch 3), Al Rayyan

=== Group B ===
| Pos | Team | Pld | W | D | L | GF | GA | GD | Pts | Qualification |
|---|---|---|---|---|---|---|---|---|---|---|
| 1 | South Korea (Q) | 2 | 2 | 0 | 0 | 9 | 0 | +9 | 6 | Knockout stage |
| 2 | Ecuador | 2 | 1 | 1 | 0 | 1 | 0 | +1 | 4 | Knockout stage |
| 3 | Uganda | 2 | 0 | 1 | 1 | 0 | 3 | −3 | 1 | Possible knockout stage |
| 4 | New Caledonia | 2 | 0 | 0 | 2 | 0 | 7 | −7 | 0 | |

Updated to match(es) played on 22 November 2026. Source: FIFA
Rules for classification: Group stage tiebreakers
(Q) Qualified for the phase indicated
19 November 2026
16:00

| New Caledonia | 0–1 | Ecuador |
|---|---|---|
| | Report | Guerrero 45+1' |

Aspire Zone (Pitch 4), Al Rayyan
Referee: Josué Ugalde (Costa Rica)
19 November 2026
16:30

| South Korea | 3–0 | Uganda |
|---|---|---|
| Kim Ji-ho 8'; Mbalire 50' (o.g.); Kim Ji-woo 84' | Report |

Aspire Zone (Pitch 1), Al Rayyan
Referee: Olatz Rivera Olmedo (Spain)

22 November 2026
16:00

| Ecuador | 0–0 | Uganda |
|---|---|---|
| | Report |

Aspire Zone (Pitch 1), Al Rayyan
Referee: Elçin Məsiyev (Azerbaijan)
22 November 2026
17:30

| South Korea | 6–0 | New Caledonia |
|---|---|---|
| Park Joo-ho 5'; Kim Ji-woo 15', 20', 53'; Ahn Sun-hyun 25'; Han Seung-min 27' | Report |

Aspire Zone (Pitch 3), Al Rayyan
Referee: Ismael López Peñuelas (Mexico)

25 November 2026
15:30

| Ecuador | v | South Korea |
|---|---|---|
| | Report |

Aspire Zone (Pitch 4), Al Rayyan
25 November 2026
15:30

| Uganda | v | New Caledonia |
|---|---|---|
| | Report |

Aspire Zone (Pitch 9), Al Rayyan

=== Group C ===
| Pos | Team | Pld | W | D | L | GF | GA | GD | Pts | Qualification |
|---|---|---|---|---|---|---|---|---|---|---|
| 1 | Australia | 2 | 1 | 1 | 0 | 2 | 0 | +2 | 4 | Knockout stage |
| 2 | Argentina | 2 | 1 | 0 | 1 | 2 | 3 | −1 | 3 (Note: Points obtained in the matches played between the teams in question: Argentina 3, Mozambique 0) | Knockout stage |
| 3 | Mozambique | 2 | 1 | 0 | 1 | 5 | 2 | +3 | 3 | Possible knockout stage |
| 4 | Denmark | 2 | 0 | 1 | 1 | 0 | 4 | −4 | 1 | |

Updated to match(es) played on 22 November 2026. Source: FIFA
Rules for classification: Group stage tiebreakers
Notes:
19 November 2026
18:00

| Mozambique | 4–0 | Denmark |
|---|---|---|
| Khensane 4'; Cuna 32', 44'; Mubai 90+1' | Report |

Aspire Zone (Pitch 3), Al Rayyan
Referee: Asker Nadjafaliev (Uzbekistan)
19 November 2026
19:00

| Argentina | 0–2 | Australia |
|---|---|---|
| | Report | Güich 60' (o.g.); Akon 71' |

Aspire Zone (Pitch 8), Al Rayyan
Referee: Michael Venne (Canada)

22 November 2026
15:30

| Denmark | 0–0 | Australia |
|---|---|---|
| | Report |

Aspire Zone (Pitch 4), Al Rayyan
Referee: Kasimu Abdulsalam (Nigeria)
22 November 2026
18:30

| Argentina | 2–1 | Mozambique |
|---|---|---|
| Machuca 5'; S. Escobar 32' | Report | Cuna 45+1' |

Aspire Zone (Pitch 7), Al Rayyan
Referee: Damian Sylwestrzak (Poland)

25 November 2026
18:30

| Denmark | v | Argentina |
|---|---|---|
| | Report |

Aspire Zone (Pitch 7), Al Rayyan
25 November 2026
18:30

| Australia | v | Mozambique |
|---|---|---|
| | Report |

Aspire Zone (Pitch 8), Al Rayyan

=== Group D ===
| Pos | Team | Pld | W | D | L | GF | GA | GD | Pts | Qualification |
|---|---|---|---|---|---|---|---|---|---|---|
| 1 | Uruguay | 2 | 2 | 0 | 0 | 7 | 3 | +4 | 6 | Knockout stage |
| 2 | Saudi Arabia | 2 | 1 | 0 | 1 | 3 | 3 | 0 | 3 (Note: Points obtained in the matches played between the teams in question: Saudi Arabia 3, France 0) | Knockout stage |
| 3 | France | 2 | 1 | 0 | 1 | 3 | 2 | +1 | 3 | Possible knockout stage |
| 4 | Haiti | 2 | 0 | 0 | 2 | 2 | 7 | −5 | 0 | |

Updated to match(es) played on 22 November 2026. Source: FIFA
Rules for classification: Group stage tiebreakers
Notes:
19 November 2026
16:00

| France | 3–1 | Haiti |
|---|---|---|
| Merrifield 4', 41'; Tiehi 47' | Report | Prophète 88' |

Aspire Zone (Pitch 9), Al Rayyan
Referee: Du Jianxin (China)
19 November 2026
17:00

| Saudi Arabia | 2–3 | Uruguay |
|---|---|---|
| Bu Shaqraa 38' (pen.), 58' (pen.) | Report | Barreiro 44'; Al-Hashim 69' (o.g.); F. Rodríguez 86' |

Aspire Zone (Pitch 5), Al Rayyan
Referee: Miloš Milanović (Serbia)

22 November 2026
16:30

| France | 0–1 | Saudi Arabia |
|---|---|---|
| | Report | Al-Kahtani 73' |

Aspire Zone (Pitch 5), Al Rayyan
Referee: Fernando Morón (Panama)
22 November 2026
18:30

| Uruguay | 4–1 | Haiti |
|---|---|---|
| Muñiz 32'; Barreiro 39'; N. Rodríguez 76'; Soares de Lima 82' | Report | Exilas 20' |

Aspire Zone (Pitch 8), Al Rayyan
Referee: Asker Nadjafaliev (Uzbekistan)

25 November 2026
16:30

| Uruguay | v | France |
|---|---|---|
| | Report |

Aspire Zone (Pitch 5), Al Rayyan
25 November 2026
16:30

| Haiti | v | Saudi Arabia |
|---|---|---|
| | Report |

Aspire Zone (Pitch 1), Al Rayyan

=== Group E ===
| Pos | Team | Pld | W | D | L | GF | GA | GD | Pts | Qualification |
|---|---|---|---|---|---|---|---|---|---|---|
| 1 | Italy | 1 | 1 | 0 | 0 | 6 | 0 | +6 | 3 | Knockout stage |
| 2 | Ivory Coast | 1 | 1 | 0 | 0 | 2 | 1 | +1 | 3 | Knockout stage |
| 3 | Uzbekistan | 1 | 0 | 0 | 1 | 1 | 2 | −1 | 0 | Possible knockout stage |
| 4 | Jamaica | 1 | 0 | 0 | 1 | 0 | 6 | −6 | 0 | |

Updated to match(es) played on 20 November 2026. Source: FIFA
Rules for classification: Group stage tiebreakers
20 November 2026
18:00

| Italy | 6–0 | Jamaica |
|---|---|---|
| Croci 7', 15'; Perillo 34'; Nolan 43' (o.g.); Giammattei 56'; Corigliano 78' | Report |

Aspire Zone (Pitch 3), Al Rayyan
Referee: Sebastián Zunino (Argentina)
20 November 2026
19:00

| Ivory Coast | 2–1 | Uzbekistan |
|---|---|---|
| Yao 7'; Diarrassouba 89' | Report | Khakimov 51' |

Aspire Zone (Pitch 8), Al Rayyan
Referee: Radoslav Gidzhenov (Bulgaria)

23 November 2026
16:00

| Uzbekistan | v | Jamaica |
|---|---|---|
| | Report |

Aspire Zone (Pitch 1), Al Rayyan
23 November 2026
17:30

| Italy | v | Ivory Coast |
|---|---|---|
| | Report |

Aspire Zone (Pitch 3), Al Rayyan

26 November 2026
17:00

| Uzbekistan | v | Italy |
|---|---|---|
| | Report |

Aspire Zone (Pitch 5), Al Rayyan
26 November 2026
17:00

| Jamaica | v | Ivory Coast |
|---|---|---|
| | Report |

Aspire Zone (Pitch 1), Al Rayyan

=== Group F ===
| Pos | Team | Pld | W | D | L | GF | GA | GD | Pts | Qualification |
|---|---|---|---|---|---|---|---|---|---|---|
| 1 | Tajikistan | 1 | 1 | 0 | 0 | 5 | 3 | +2 | 3 | Knockout stage |
| 2 | Senegal | 1 | 0 | 1 | 0 | 1 | 1 | 0 | 1 | Knockout stage |
| 3 | Croatia | 1 | 0 | 1 | 0 | 1 | 1 | 0 | 1 | Possible knockout stage |
| 4 | Cuba | 1 | 0 | 0 | 1 | 3 | 5 | −2 | 0 | |

Updated to match(es) played on 20 November 2026. Source: FIFA
20 November 2026
16:00

| Cuba | 3–5 | Tajikistan |
|---|---|---|
| González 44', 67'; Iglesias 70' | Report | Sharipov 48'; Bobonazarov 57'; Makhtumov 61', 64'; Radzhabzod 76' |

Aspire Zone (Pitch 4), Al Rayyan
Referee: Derlis Benítez (Paraguay)
20 November 2026
18:30

| Senegal | 1–1 | Croatia |
|---|---|---|
| Mbodji 45' | Report | Bartolović 8' |

Aspire Zone (Pitch 2), Al Rayyan
Referee: Calvin Berg (New Zealand)

23 November 2026
15:30

| Tajikistan | v | Croatia |
|---|---|---|
| | Report |

Aspire Zone (Pitch 9), Al Rayyan
23 November 2026
16:30

| Senegal | v | Cuba |
|---|---|---|
| | Report |

Aspire Zone (Pitch 5), Al Rayyan

26 November 2026
19:00

| Tajikistan | v | Senegal |
|---|---|---|
| | Report |

Aspire Zone (Pitch 7), Al Rayyan
26 November 2026
19:00

| Croatia | v | Cuba |
|---|---|---|
| | Report |

Aspire Zone (Pitch 8), Al Rayyan

=== Group G ===
| Pos | Team | Pld | W | D | L | GF | GA | GD | Pts | Qualification |
|---|---|---|---|---|---|---|---|---|---|---|
| 1 | Mali | 1 | 1 | 0 | 0 | 3 | 0 | +3 | 3 | Knockout stage |
| 2 | Belgium | 1 | 1 | 0 | 0 | 3 | 2 | +1 | 3 | Knockout stage |
| 3 | Vietnam | 1 | 0 | 0 | 1 | 2 | 3 | −1 | 0 | Possible knockout stage |
| 4 | New Zealand | 1 | 0 | 0 | 1 | 0 | 3 | −3 | 0 | |

Updated to match(es) played on 20 November 2026. Source: FIFA
Rules for classification: Group stage tiebreakers
20 November 2026
16:00

| Belgium | 3–2 | Vietnam |
|---|---|---|
| Moorthamer 39'; Achahbar 42'; Philips 60' | Report | Lê Sỹ Bách 4'; Chu Ngọc Nguyễn Lực 84' |

Aspire Zone (Pitch 9), Al Rayyan
Referee: Daiane Muniz (Brazil)
20 November 2026
16:30

| Mali | 3–0 | New Zealand |
|---|---|---|
| H. Maïga 11', 50'; Sacko 54' | Report |

Aspire Zone (Pitch 1), Al Rayyan
Referee: Oswaldo Contreras (Ecuador)

23 November 2026
18:30

| Mali | v | Belgium |
|---|---|---|
| | Report |

Aspire Zone (Pitch 7), Al Rayyan
23 November 2026
18:30

| Vietnam | v | New Zealand |
|---|---|---|
| | Report |

Aspire Zone (Pitch 8), Al Rayyan

26 November 2026
16:00

| Vietnam | v | Mali |
|---|---|---|
| | Report |

Aspire Zone (Pitch 9), Al Rayyan
26 November 2026
16:00

| New Zealand | v | Belgium |
|---|---|---|
| | Report |

Aspire Zone (Pitch 4), Al Rayyan

=== Group H ===
| Pos | Team | Pld | W | D | L | GF | GA | GD | Pts | Qualification |
|---|---|---|---|---|---|---|---|---|---|---|
| 1 | Morocco | 1 | 1 | 0 | 0 | 6 | 0 | +6 | 3 | Knockout stage |
| 2 | Spain | 1 | 1 | 0 | 0 | 5 | 0 | +5 | 3 | Knockout stage |
| 3 | China | 1 | 0 | 0 | 1 | 0 | 5 | −5 | 0 | Possible knockout stage |
| 4 | Fiji | 1 | 0 | 0 | 1 | 0 | 6 | −6 | 0 | |

Updated to match(es) played on 20 November 2026. Source: FIFA
Rules for classification: Group stage tiebreakers
20 November 2026
17:00

| Spain | 5–0 | China |
|---|---|---|
| Pesquer 40' (pen.); Tunkara 45+2'; Emeka 73', 79'; Trujillano 85' | Report |

Aspire Zone (Pitch 5), Al Rayyan
Referee: Mathias de Armas (Uruguay)
20 November 2026
19:00

| Fiji | 0−6 | Morocco |
|---|---|---|
| | Report | El Aoud 3'; Rabbaj 5'; Talai 42'; Baha 49', 55' (pen.); Lougmani 85' |

Aspire Zone (Pitch 7), Al Rayyan
Referee: Jairo Mayorga (Colombia)

23 November 2026
15:30

| Spain | v | Fiji |
|---|---|---|
| | Report |

Aspire Zone (Pitch 4), Al Rayyan
23 November 2026
18:00

| Morocco | v | China |
|---|---|---|
| | Report |

Aspire Zone (Pitch 2), Al Rayyan

26 November 2026
18:00

| Morocco | v | Spain |
|---|---|---|
| | Report |

Aspire Zone (Pitch 2), Al Rayyan
26 November 2026
18:00

| China | v | Fiji |
|---|---|---|
| | Report |

Aspire Zone (Pitch 3), Al Rayyan

=== Group I ===
| Pos | Team | Pld | W | D | L | GF | GA | GD | Pts | Qualification |
|---|---|---|---|---|---|---|---|---|---|---|
| 1 | Brazil | 1 | 1 | 0 | 0 | 2 | 1 | +1 | 3 | Knockout stage |
| 2 | Costa Rica | 1 | 0 | 1 | 0 | 2 | 2 | 0 | 1 (Note: Fair play points:Costa Rica –1, Tanzania –3) | Knockout stage |
| 3 | Tanzania | 1 | 0 | 1 | 0 | 2 | 2 | 0 | 1 | Possible knockout stage |
| 4 | Republic of Ireland | 1 | 0 | 0 | 1 | 1 | 2 | −1 | 0 | |

Updated to match(es) played on 21 November 2026. Source: FIFA
Rules for classification: Group stage tiebreakers
Notes:
21 November 2026
16:00

| Tanzania | 2–2 | Costa Rica |
|---|---|---|
| Kayanda 51', 73' | Report | Urbina 8'; Pilarte 15' |

Aspire Zone (Pitch 1), Al Rayyan
Referee: Patrik Kolarić (Croatia)
21 November 2026
18:00

| Brazil | 2–1 | Republic of Ireland |
|---|---|---|
| Rodrigo Júnior 30'; Dudú 71' | Report | Sheridan 44' |

Aspire Zone (Pitch 2), Al Rayyan
Referee: Mohamed El-Baroudi (Morocco)

24 November 2026
15:30

| Costa Rica | v | Republic of Ireland |
|---|---|---|
| | Report |

Aspire Zone (Pitch 4), Al Rayyan
24 November 2026
18:00

| Brazil | v | Tanzania |
|---|---|---|
| | Report |

Aspire Zone (Pitch 2), Al Rayyan

27 November 2026
17:00

| Costa Rica | v | Brazil |
|---|---|---|
| | Report |

Aspire Zone (Pitch 5), Al Rayyan
27 November 2026
17:00

| Republic of Ireland | v | Tanzania |
|---|---|---|
| | Report |

Aspire Zone (Pitch 1), Al Rayyan

=== Group J ===
| Pos | Team | Pld | W | D | L | GF | GA | GD | Pts | Qualification |
|---|---|---|---|---|---|---|---|---|---|---|
| 1 | Chile | 1 | 1 | 0 | 0 | 4 | 2 | +2 | 3 | Knockout stage |
| 2 | Montenegro | 1 | 0 | 1 | 0 | 1 | 1 | 0 | 1 (Note: Fair play points:Montenegro –1, Dominican Republic –2) | Knockout stage |
| 3 | Dominican Republic | 1 | 0 | 1 | 0 | 1 | 1 | 0 | 1 | Possible knockout stage |
| 4 | Algeria | 1 | 0 | 0 | 1 | 2 | 4 | −2 | 0 | |

Updated to match(es) played on 21 November 2026. Source: FIFA
Rules for classification: Group stage tiebreakers
Notes:
21 November 2026
17:30

| Dominican Republic | 1–1 | Montenegro |
|---|---|---|
| Castillo 24' | Report | Ðokaj 12' |

Aspire Zone (Pitch 3), Al Rayyan
Referee: Elhadji Amadou Sy (Senegal)
21 November 2026
18:30

| Chile | 4–2 | Algeria |
|---|---|---|
| Catalán 20'; López 28'; Pérez 34'; Guerrero 82' | Report | Mekkaoui 8'; Abed 15' |

Aspire Zone (Pitch 7), Al Rayyan
Referee: Abdulhadi Al-Ruaile (Qatar)

24 November 2026
17:30

| Dominican Republic | v | Chile |
|---|---|---|
| | Report |

Aspire Zone (Pitch 3), Al Rayyan
24 November 2026
18:30

| Algeria | v | Montenegro |
|---|---|---|
| | Report |

Aspire Zone (Pitch 7), Al Rayyan

27 November 2026
18:00

| Algeria | v | Dominican Republic |
|---|---|---|
| | Report |

Aspire Zone (Pitch 2), Al Rayyan
27 November 2026
18:00

| Montenegro | v | Chile |
|---|---|---|
| | Report |

Aspire Zone (Pitch 3), Al Rayyan

=== Group K ===
| Pos | Team | Pld | W | D | L | GF | GA | GD | Pts | Qualification |
|---|---|---|---|---|---|---|---|---|---|---|
| 1 | Venezuela | 1 | 1 | 0 | 0 | 2 | 1 | +1 | 3 | Knockout stage |
| 2 | Mexico | 1 | 1 | 0 | 0 | 1 | 0 | +1 | 3 | Knockout stage |
| 3 | Cameroon | 1 | 0 | 0 | 1 | 1 | 2 | −1 | 0 | Possible knockout stage |
| 4 | Romania | 1 | 0 | 0 | 1 | 0 | 1 | −1 | 0 | |

Updated to match(es) played on 21 November 2026. Source: FIFA
Rules for classification: Group stage tiebreakers
21 November 2026
16:30

| Cameroon | 1–2 | Venezuela |
|---|---|---|
| Hentcho 90+2' | Report | Lozada 29'; Sánchez 59' |

Aspire Zone (Pitch 5), Al Rayyan
Referee: Ahmed Darwish (United Arab Emirates)
21 November 2026
18:30

| Mexico | 1–0 | Romania |
|---|---|---|
| Sánchez 55' | Report |

Aspire Zone (Pitch 8), Al Rayyan
Referee: Sami Al-Ismail (Saudi Arabia)

24 November 2026
15:30

| Venezuela | v | Romania |
|---|---|---|
| | Report |

Aspire Zone (Pitch 5), Al Rayyan
24 November 2026
16:30

| Mexico | v | Cameroon |
|---|---|---|
| | Report |

Aspire Zone (Pitch 9), Al Rayyan

27 November 2026
19:00

| Venezuela | v | Mexico |
|---|---|---|
| | Report |

Aspire Zone (Pitch 7), Al Rayyan
27 November 2026
19:00

| Romania | v | Cameroon |
|---|---|---|
| | Report |

Aspire Zone (Pitch 8), Al Rayyan

=== Group L ===
| Pos | Team | Pld | W | D | L | GF | GA | GD | Pts | Qualification |
|---|---|---|---|---|---|---|---|---|---|---|
| 1 | Serbia | 1 | 1 | 0 | 0 | 2 | 0 | +2 | 3 | Knockout stage |
| 2 | Colombia | 1 | 1 | 0 | 0 | 2 | 1 | +1 | 3 | Knockout stage |
| 3 | Japan | 1 | 0 | 0 | 1 | 1 | 2 | −1 | 0 | Possible knockout stage |
| 4 | Honduras | 1 | 0 | 0 | 1 | 0 | 2 | −2 | 0 | |

Updated to match(es) played on 21 November 2026. Source: FIFA
Rules for classification: Group stage tiebreakers
21 November 2026
15:30

| Japan | 1–2 | Colombia |
|---|---|---|
| Saito 38' | Report | Agámez 5'; S. Martínez 90+3' (pen.) |

Aspire Zone (Pitch 9), Al Rayyan
Referee: Willy Delajod (France)
21 November 2026
15:30

| Serbia | 2–0 | Honduras |
|---|---|---|
| Samardžić 50', 71' | Report |

Aspire Zone (Pitch 4), Al Rayyan
Referee: Willy Ngah (Cameroon)

24 November 2026
16:00

| Japan | v | Serbia |
|---|---|---|
| | Report |

Aspire Zone (Pitch 1), Al Rayyan
24 November 2026
18:30

| Honduras | v | Colombia |
|---|---|---|
| | Report |

Aspire Zone (Pitch 8), Al Rayyan

27 November 2026
16:00

| Honduras | v | Japan |
|---|---|---|
| | Report |

Aspire Zone (Pitch 4), Al Rayyan
27 November 2026
16:00

| Colombia | v | Serbia |
|---|---|---|
| | Report |

Aspire Zone (Pitch 9), Al Rayyan

=== Ranking of third-placed teams ===
Tie-breaking criteria for qualified teams
The ranking of third-placed teams was determined as follows:
1. Points obtained in all group matches;
2. Goal difference in all group matches;
3. Number of goals scored in all group matches;
4. Fair play points in all group matches (only one deduction could be applied to a player in a single match):
  - Yellow card: −1 points;
  - Indirect red card (second yellow card): −3 points;
  - Direct red card: −4 points;
  - Yellow card and direct red card: −5 points;
5. Drawing of lots.

| Pos | Grp | Team | Pld | W | D | L | GF | GA | GD | Pts | Qualification |
|---|---|---|---|---|---|---|---|---|---|---|---|
| 1 | C | Mozambique | 2 | 1 | 0 | 1 | 5 | 2 | +3 | 3 | Knockout stage |
| 2 | D | France | 2 | 1 | 0 | 1 | 3 | 2 | +1 | 3 | Knockout stage |
| 3 | A | Qatar | 2 | 1 | 0 | 1 | 2 | 2 | 0 | 3 | Knockout stage |
| 4 | I | Tanzania | 1 | 0 | 1 | 0 | 2 | 2 | 0 | 1 | Knockout stage |
| 5 | J | Dominican Republic | 1 | 0 | 1 | 0 | 1 | 1 | 0 | 1 (Note: Fair play points: Dominican Republic –2, Senegal –5) | Knockout stage |
| 6 | F | Senegal | 1 | 0 | 1 | 0 | 1 | 1 | 0 | 1 | Knockout stage |
| 7 | B | Uganda | 2 | 0 | 1 | 1 | 0 | 3 | −3 | 1 | Knockout stage |
| 8 | G | Vietnam | 1 | 0 | 0 | 1 | 2 | 3 | −1 | 0 | Knockout stage |
| 9 | E | Uzbekistan | 1 | 0 | 0 | 1 | 1 | 2 | −1 | 0 (Note: Fair play points: Uzbekistan –2, Japan –3, Cameroon -5) | |
| 10 | L | Japan | 1 | 0 | 0 | 1 | 1 | 2 | −1 | 0 | |
| 11 | K | Cameroon | 1 | 0 | 0 | 1 | 1 | 2 | −1 | 0 | |
| 12 | H | China | 1 | 0 | 0 | 1 | 0 | 5 | −5 | 0 | |

Updated to match(es) played on 22 November 2026. Source: FIFA
Rules for classification: Qualified teams tiebreakers

== Knockout stage ==
In the knockout stage, if a match was level at the end of normal playing time, no extra time was played and the winners were determined by penalty shoot-out.

== Goalscorers ==
There have been 106 goals scored in 32 matches, for an average of 3.31 goals per match (as of 22 November 2026).

4 goals

- (South Korea) Kim Ji-woo

3 goals

- (Mozambique) Alirio Cuna

2 goals

- (Cuba) Yojanry González
- (France) Loan Merrifield
- (Italy) Federico Croci
- (Mali) Halidou Maïga
- (Morocco) Ziyad Baha
- (Saudi Arabia) Faris Bu Shaqraa
- (Serbia) Tadija Samardžić
- (Spain) Owen Emeka
- (Tajikistan) Asadbek Makhtumov
- (Tanzania) Faraji Kayanda
- (Uruguay) Pablo Barreiro

1 goal

- (Algeria) Yacine Abed
- (Algeria) Ilyes Mekkaoui
- (Argentina) Simón Escobar
- (Argentina) Matheo Machuca
- (Australia) Akol Akon
- (Brazil) Eduardo Conceição
- (Brazil) Rodrigo Júnior
- (Belgium) Kiyan Achahbar
- (Belgium) Tinus Moorthamer
- (Belgium) Anthony Philips
- (Cameroon) Aviel Hentcho
- (Chile) Rodrigo Catalán
- (Chile) Jonathan Guerrero
- (Chile) Lucas López
- (Chile) Amaro Pérez
- (Colombia) Miguel Agámez
- (Colombia) Samuel Martínez
- (Costa Rica) Jorshuad Pilarte
- (Costa Rica) Jefrey Urbina
- (Croatia) Luka Bartolović
- (Cuba) Yankarlos Iglesias
- (Dominican Republic) Kamil Castillo
- (Ecuador) Jhon Guerrero
- (Egypt) Khaled Mokhtar
- (Egypt) Ahmed Safwat
- (Egypt) Ziad Saoudi
- (France) Noha Tiehi
- (Greece) Konstantinos Karangelis
- (Greece) Sarafianos Papasarafianos
- (Greece) Georgios Siozios
- (Greece) Konstantinos Souvlatzis
- (Haiti) Marvenly Exilas
- (Haiti) Macenat Prophète
- (Republic of Ireland) Ryan Sheridan
- (Italy) Thomas Corigliano
- (Italy) Gioele Giammattei
- (Italy) Diego Perillo
- (Ivory Coast) Abass Diarrassouba
- (Ivory Coast) Hubert Yao
- (Japan) Kakeru Saito
- (Mali) Makan Sacko
- (Mexico) Adán Sánchez
- (Montenegro) Mark Ðokaj
- (Morocco) Ismail El Aoud
- (Morocco) Rami Lougmani
- (Morocco) Ibrahim Rabbaj
- (Morocco) Imran Talai
- (Mozambique) Khensane
- (Mozambique) Joaquim Mubai
- (Panama) Estevis López
- (Qatar) Taha Nassir
- (Qatar) Abdoulaye Ndiaye
- (Saudi Arabia) Shaman Al-Kahtani
- (Senegal) Sega Mbodji
- (South Korea) Ahn Sun-hyun
- (South Korea) Han Seung-min
- (South Korea) Kim Ji-ho
- (South Korea) Park Joo-ho
- (Spain) Jordi Pesquer
- (Spain) Guillermo Trujillano
- (Spain) Ebrima Tunkara
- (Tajikistan) Parviz Bobonazarov
- (Tajikistan) Bikhishti Radzhabzod
- (Tajikistan) Komiljon Sharipov
- (Uruguay) Lautaro Muñiz
- (Uruguay) Facundo Rodríguez
- (Uruguay) Nicolás Rodríguez
- (Uruguay) Alan Soares de Lima
- (Uzbekistan) Mukhammad Khakimov
- (Venezuela) Román Lozada
- (Venezuela) Santiago Sánchez
- (Vietnam) Chu Ngọc Nguyễn Lực
- (Vietnam) Lê Sỹ Bách

1 own goal

- (Argentina) Álvaro Güich (against Australia)
- (Jamaica) Jahmarie Nolan (against Italy)
- (Saudi Arabia) Jawad Al-Hashim (against Uruguay)
- (Uganda) Mujad Mbalire (against South Korea)

== Controversies ==
=== Hosting rights ===
Although FIFA did not disclose whether there were other interested member associations, a joint bid by Indonesia and Singapore and another by Denmark were known to have been submitted.

The Danish Football Association accused FIFA of changing the format to a five-year package without clearly announcing it. They said that they and other potential bidders were blindsided by FIFA when Qatar and Morocco—who was chosen to host the FIFA U-17 Women's World Cup during the same years—ended up with the deal, saying that "FIFA moved the goalposts".

This joined previous controversies regarding Qatar hosting the 2022 FIFA World Cup, such as violations of the human rights of migrant workers and FIFA's ban on the Danish football team training with pro-human rights shirts. In 2024, Amnesty International criticized FIFA and Qatar for not yet addressing the "severe" human rights violations surrounding the hosting of the 2022 World Cup, claiming that they are not taking responsibility for "the vast number of migrant workers who were exploited and in many cases died to make the 2022 World Cup possible". In 2025, Amnesty reported that "the Qatari authorities continued to fail to investigate effectively the deaths of migrant workers and to hold employers or authorities accountable, preventing any assessment of whether the deaths were work-related and depriving families of the opportunity to receive compensation." Also in 2025, Human Rights Watch stated that despite scrutiny regarding migrant worker deaths building up to the tournament, Qatar "has failed to prevent, investigate, or compensate" for the deaths of thousands of them.

=== Potential UEFA boycott ===
On 30 July 2026, following FIFA's announcement of FIFA Forward Enterprise (a proposal to sell stakes in FIFA's tournament operations, including for the U-17 World Cup, to private investors), all 55 UEFA member associations agreed on an indefinite boycott of FIFA competitions until the proposal was shelved and assurances were made that such a proposal would not be tabulated again. A day later, the proposal was scrapped, although UEFA stated that, regardless, it no longer trusts FIFA's governance. Following written assurances that a similar proposal wouldn't be brought up, UEFA provisionally suspended their boycott for the 2026–27 season, which includes the FIFA U-17 World Cup.

=== Refereeing decisions ===
The decision by Brazilian female referee Daiane Muniz to blow the final whistle during the match between Vietnam and Belgium sparked reactions among Vietnamese football fans. The controversy arose from the fact that players from both teams sustained injuries during stoppage time, causing the match to be interrupted for approximately two minutes in total. However, the referee still blew the final whistle at 90+5 without allowing additional time to compensate for the interruptions. This led the Vietnamese coaching staff, players and fans to believe that the match had been ended prematurely, particularly as the team was still pushing for an equalising goal.

== See also ==
- 2026 FIFA U-17 Women's World Cup
- 2026 FIFA U-20 Women's World Cup
