= Fereej Al Amir =

Fereej Al Amir فريج الأمير
- District
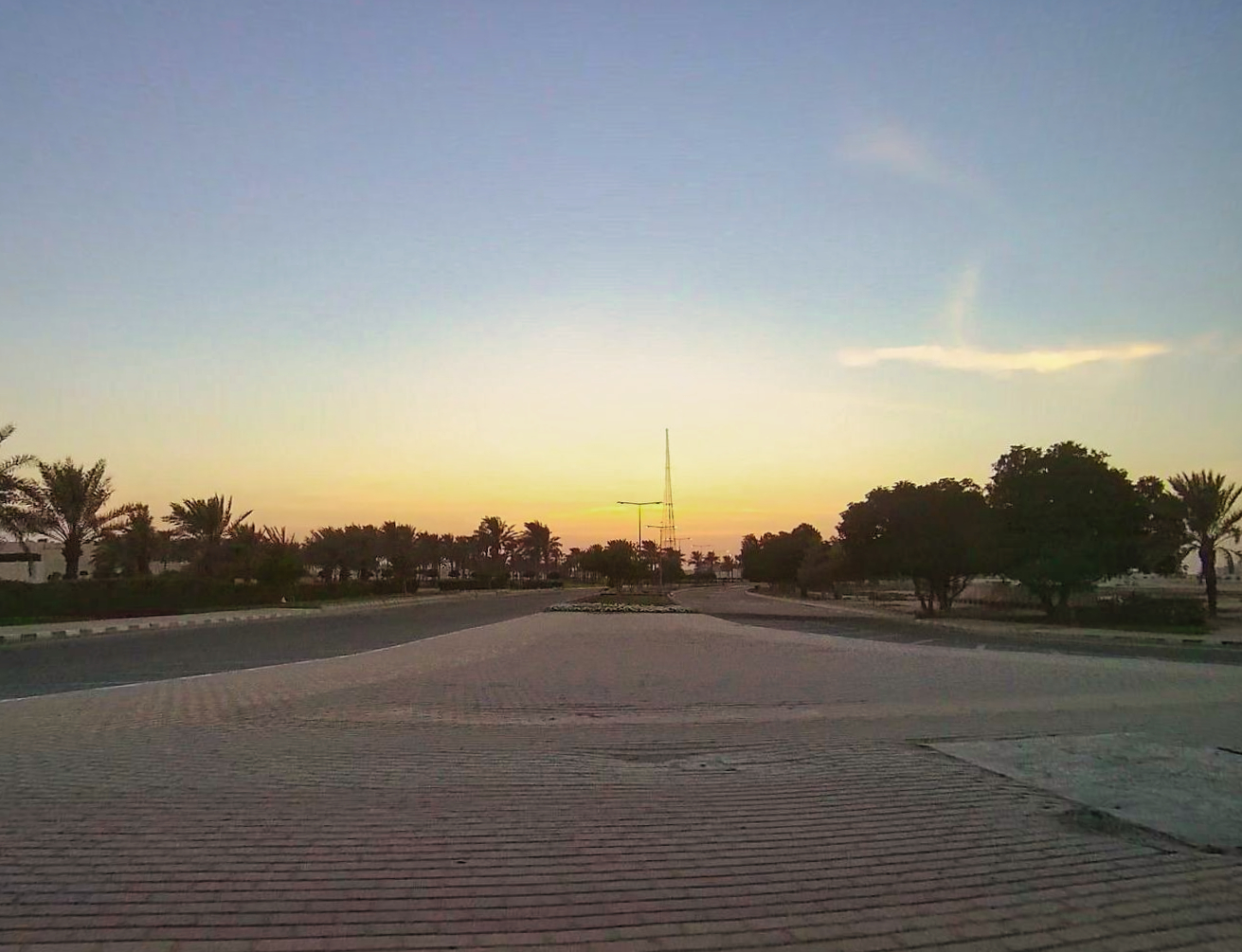
- Al Rayyan Palace Street in Fereej Al Amir

- Location within Qatar
- Coordinates: 25.287072°N 51.472931°E
- Country: Qatar
- Municipality: Al Rayyan
- Zone: Zone 54
- District no.: 77

Area
  - Total: 2.7 km^{2} (1.0 sq mi)
- Elevation: 24 m (79 ft)

Fereej Al Amir (Arabic: فريج الأمير) is a district in Qatar, located in the municipality of Al Rayyan.

In the 2015 census, it was listed as a district of zone no. 54 which has a population of 24,593 and also includes Baaya, Muraikh, Luaib, Fereej Al Soudan, and Mehairja.

It borders Luaib to the west, Fereej Al Soudan and Mehairja to the south, Al Sadd in Doha to the east, and Old Al Rayyan to the north.
