= Mehairja =

Mehairja محيرجة
- District
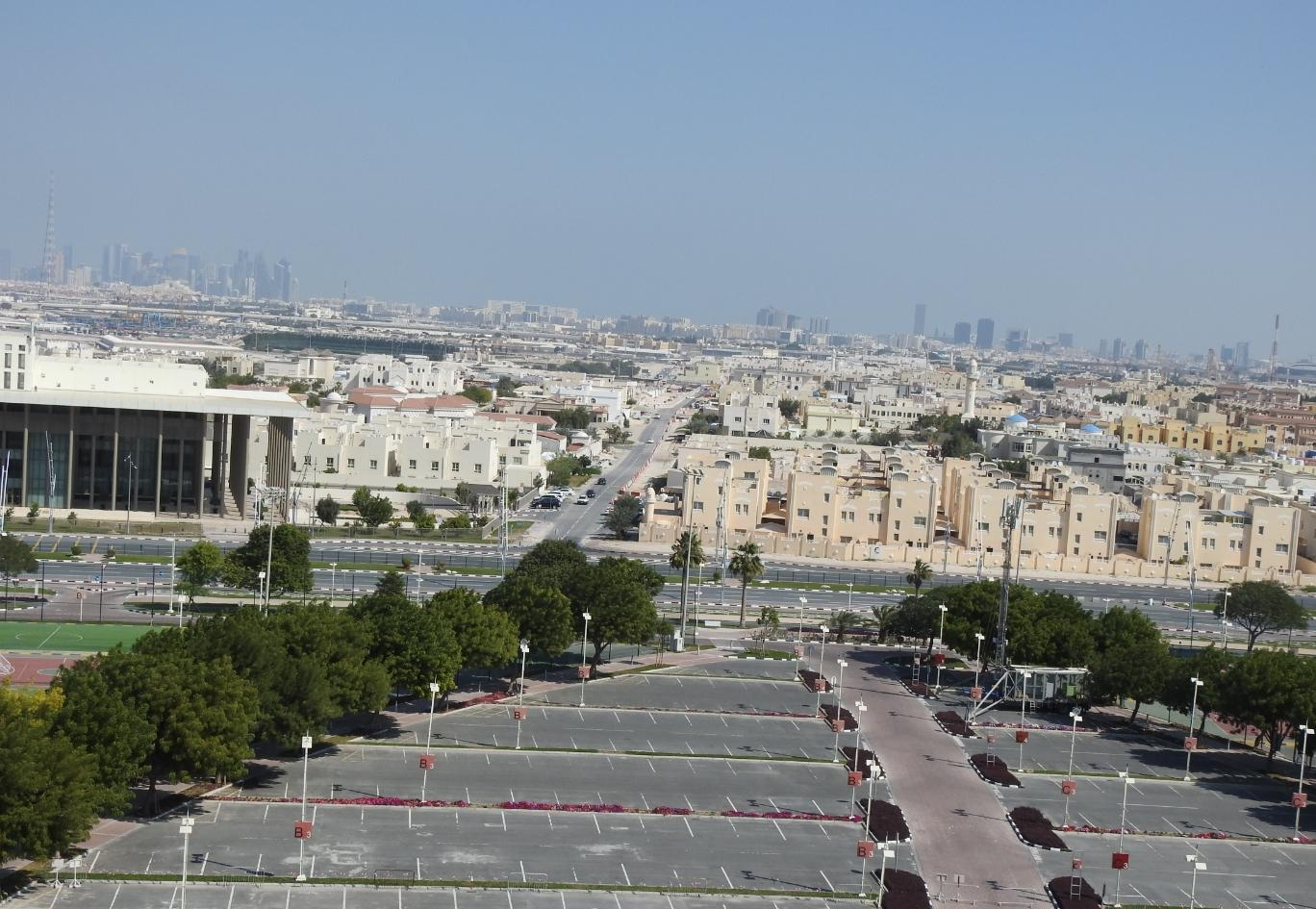
- View of Wadi Al Gaiya Street in Mehairja from Aspire Zone parking lot.

- Location within Qatar
- Coordinates: 25.2691°N 51.4598°E
- Country: Qatar
- Municipality: Al Rayyan
- Zone: Zone 54
- District no.: 81

Area
  - Total: 4.0 km^{2} (1.5 sq mi)
- Elevation: 21 m (69 ft)

Mehairja (Arabic: محيرجة; also spelled Mehairqa) is a district in Qatar, located in the municipality of Al Rayyan.

In the 2015 census it was listed as a district of Zone 54, which has a population of 24,593 and also includes Baaya, Muraikh, Luaib, Fereej Al Soudan, and Fereej Al Amir.

It borders Fereej Al Soudan to the east, Al Waab and Al Aziziya to the south, Muraikh and Luaib to the north and Baaya to the west.

== Etymology ==
The district derives its name from the Arabic word mahraqa, meaning "burnt". It was so named for its dark-colored soil and for the dark-colored leaves apparent on trees growing in the region which give the impression that its entire landscape had been charred in the past.
