= Zone 54, Qatar =

Zone 54
- Zone
- Interactive map of Zone 54
- Coordinates: 25.278654°N 51.457988°E
- Country: Qatar
- Municipality: Al Rayyan
- Blocks: 118

Area
  - Total: 18.1 km^{2} (7.0 sq mi)

Population
  - Total: 24,593 (2,015)
- Time zone: UTC+03 (Arabia Standard Time)
- ISO 3166 code: QA-RA

Zone 54 is a zone of the municipality of Al Rayyan in Qatar. The main districts recorded in the 2015 population census were Fereej Al Amir, Luaib, Muraikh, Baaya, Mehairja, Fereej Al Soudan.

== Demographics ==
Year	Population
1986	6,669
1997	8,190
2004	9,319
2010	23,591
2015	24,593

== Land use ==
The Ministry of Municipality and Environment (MME) breaks down land use in the zone as follows.

Area (km^{2})	Developed land (km^{2})	Undeveloped land (km^{2})	Residential (km^{2})	Commercial/ Industrial (km^{2})	Education/ Health (km^{2})	Farming/ Green areas (km^{2})	Other uses (km^{2})
18.06	13.95	4.11	5.60	0.42	0.34	0.58	7.01
