= Luaib =

Luaib لوعيب
- District
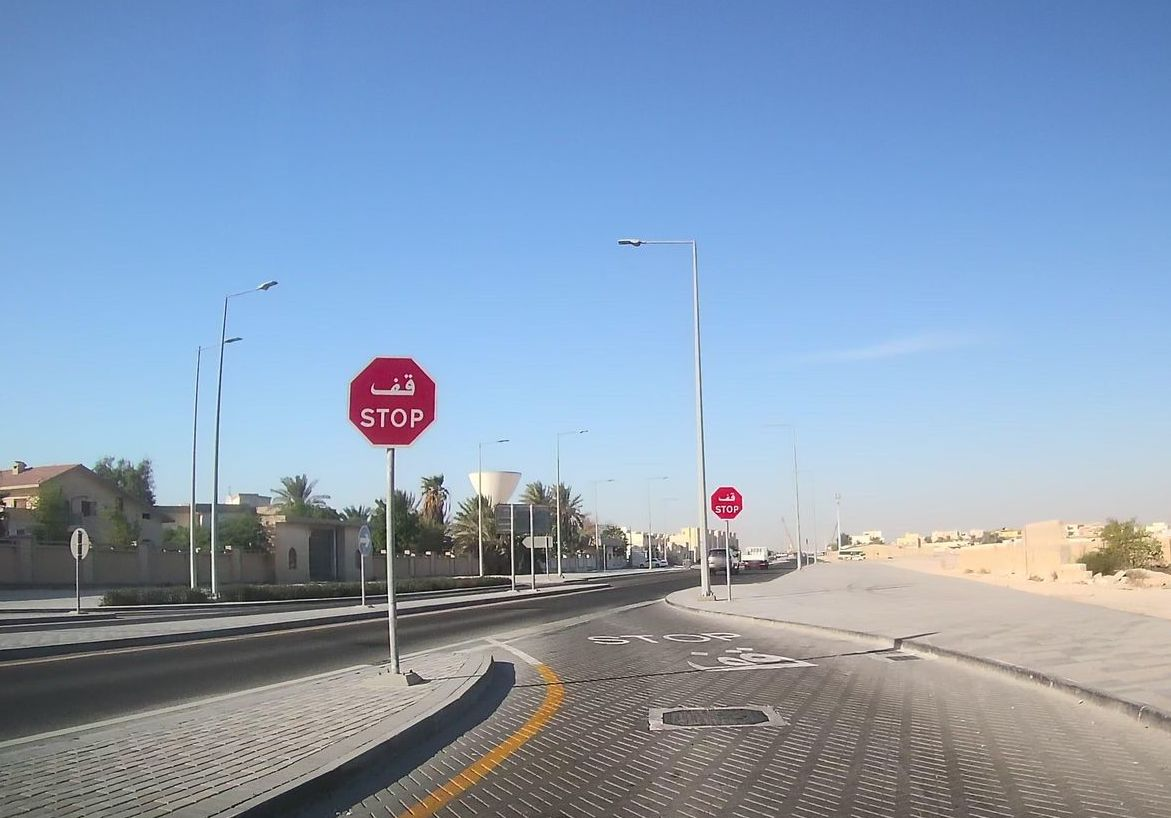
- Intersection of Al Shedaida Street and Al Samriya Street in Luaib

- Location within Qatar
- Coordinates: 25.2841°N 51.4598°E
- Country: Qatar
- Municipality: Al Rayyan
- Zone: Zone 54
- District no.: 80

Area
  - Total: 2.3 km^{2} (0.89 sq mi)
- Elevation: 22 m (72 ft)

Luaib (Arabic: لوعيب) is a district in Qatar, located in the municipality of Al Rayyan.

In the 2015 census, it was listed as a district of zone no. 54 which has a population of 24,593 and also includes Baaya, Muraikh, Mehairja, Fereej Al Soudan, and Fereej Al Amir.

It borders Muraikh to the west, Mehairja to the south, Fereej Al Amir to the east and Old Al Rayyan to the north.

== Etymology ==
Luaib's name originates from the Arabic term waab, referring to "a vast, open plain that accommodates many things". The plain, which is the defining feature of the area, is rich in plant life.

== Education ==
The following schools are located in Luaib:

Name of School	Curriculum	Grade	Genders	Ref
Al Qadasiya Model Independent Boys School	Independent	Kindergarten – Primary	Male-only	
Umm Ayman Secondary Girls School	Independent	Secondary	Female-only	
