= Zone 52, Qatar =

Zone 52
- Zone
- Interactive map of Zone 52
- Coordinates: 25.307908°N 51.440801°E
- Country: Qatar
- Municipality: Al Rayyan
- Blocks: 73

Area
  - Total: 13.4 km^{2} (5.2 sq mi)

Population
  - Total: 18,433 (2,015)
- Time zone: UTC+03 (Arabia Standard Time)
- ISO 3166 code: QA-RA

Zone 52 is a zone of the municipality of Al Rayyan in Qatar. The main districts recorded in the 2015 population census were Al Luqta, Lebday, Old Al Rayyan, Al Shagub, and Fereej Al Zaeem.

== Demographics ==
Year	Population
1986	16,302
1997	19,665
2004	21,452
2010	20,416
2015	18,433

== Land use ==
The Ministry of Municipality and Environment (MME) breaks down land use in the zone as follows.

Area (km^{2})	Developed land (km^{2})	Undeveloped land (km^{2})	Residential (km^{2})	Commercial/ Industrial (km^{2})	Education/ Health (km^{2})	Farming/ Green areas (km^{2})	Other uses (km^{2})
13.39	10.73	2.66	2.70	0.13	5.77	0.36	1.77
