= Al Luqta =

Al Luqta اللقطة
- District
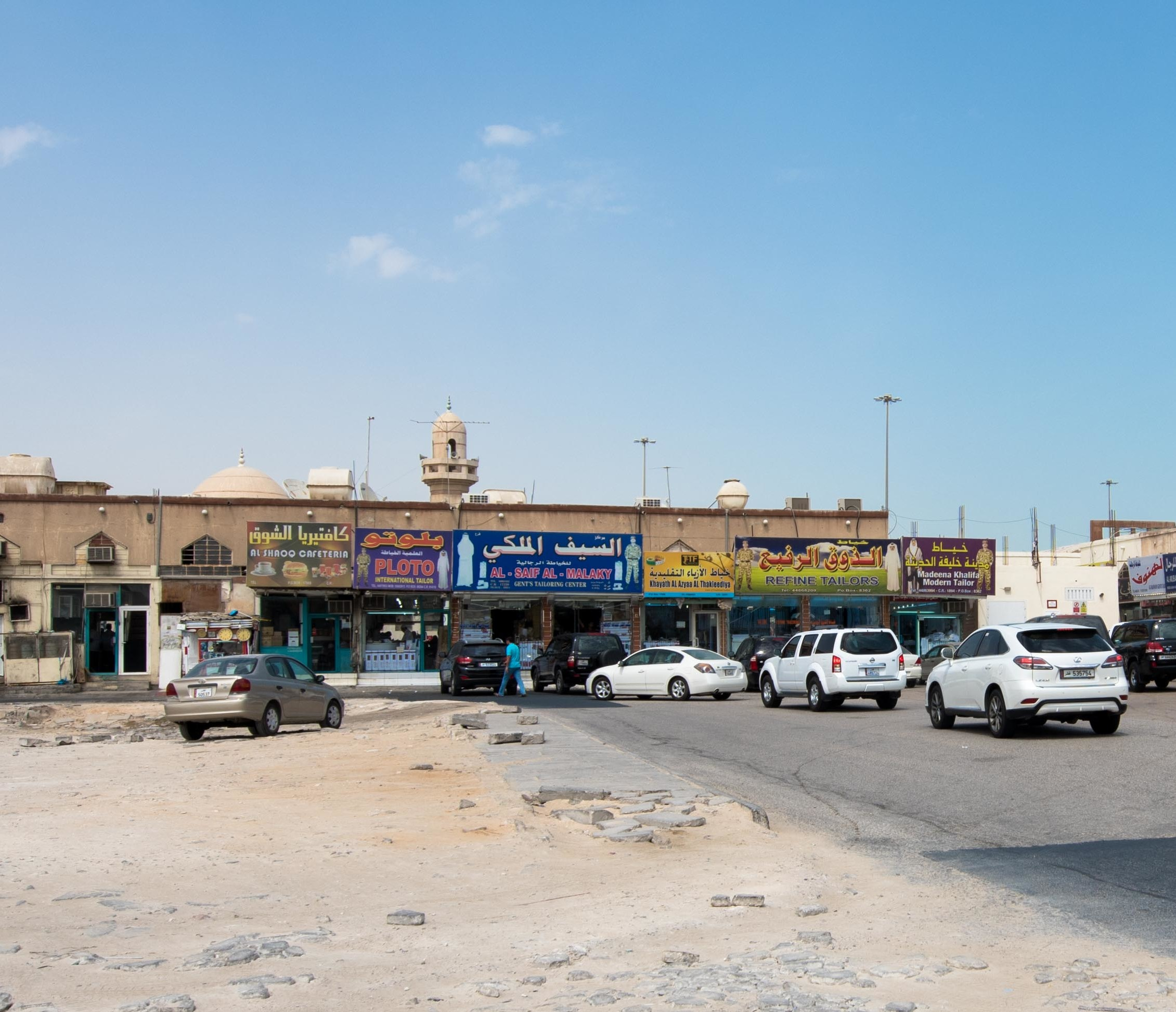
- Tailor shopping complex in Al Luqta

- Location within Qatar
- Coordinates: 25.3107°N 51.4651°E
- Country: Qatar
- Municipality: Al Rayyan
- Zone: Zone 52
- District no.: 60

Area
  - Total: 2.0 km^{2} (0.77 sq mi)
- Elevation: 23 m (75 ft)

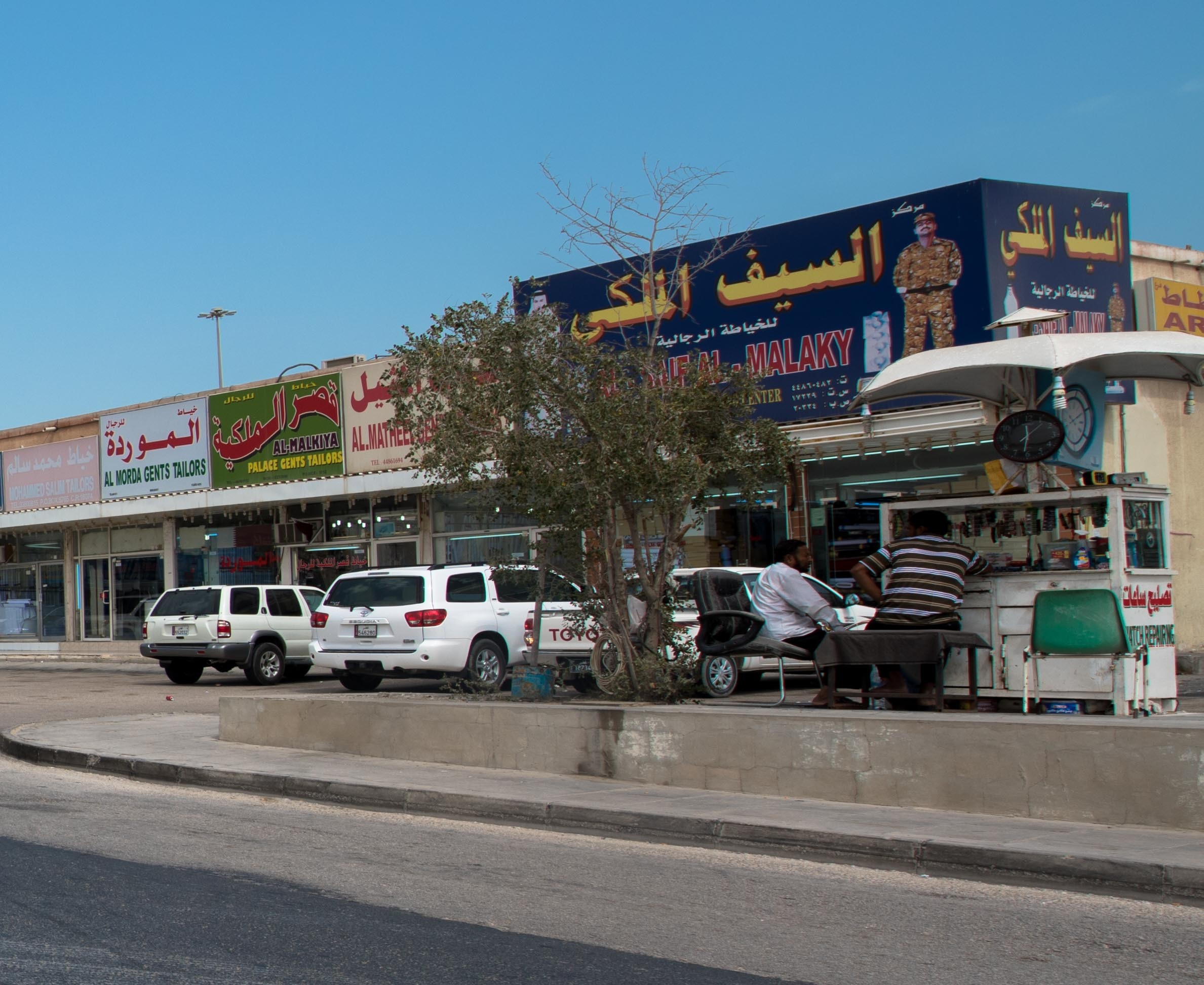
Vendors at the tailor shopping complex in Al Luqta

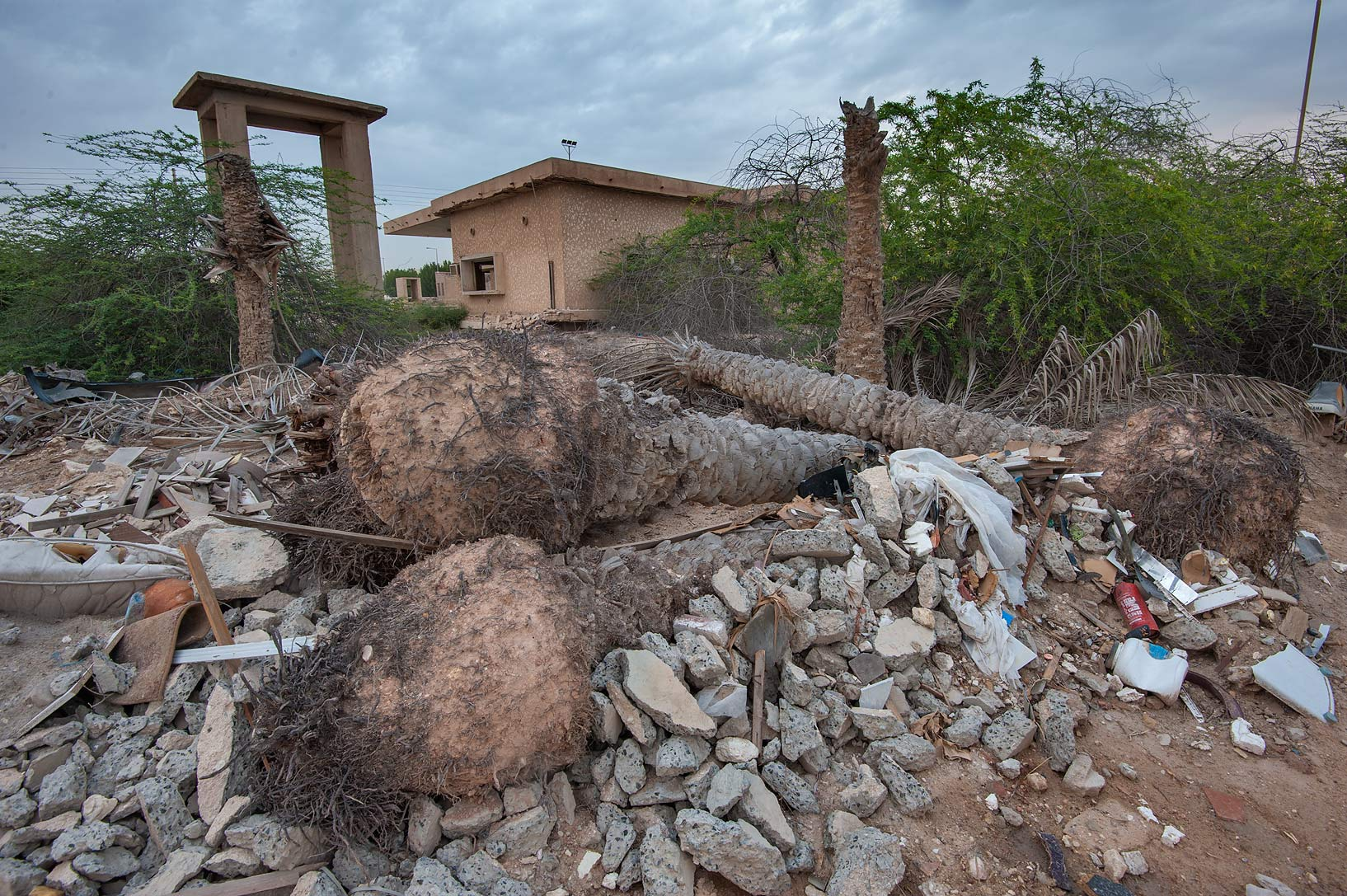
Uprooted palm trees at Makkah Street in Al Luqta

Al Luqta (Arabic: اللقطة, romanized: Al-Luqṭah) is a district of Al Rayyan City in Qatar, located in the municipality of Al Rayyan.

== Etymology ==
The district's name originates from the Arabic word luqeet, which is the term designated for an abandoned infant whose parents have not been identified. At the time of its naming, the district was situated in an isolated and largely unknown area, thus, its name is figurative for its geographic location.

== Geography ==
The districts of Al Shagub to the west and Gharrafat Al Rayyan to the north-west host Education City as well as other facilities belonging to Qatar Foundation.

== History ==
J.G. Lorimer mentioned Al Luqta in 1908 in his Gazetteer of the Persian Gulf, remarking that it appeared to be one of the only seven villages in Qatar that had sizable date palm plantations.

== Landmarks ==
- Chinese Health Centre (Ladies Branch) on Al Rayhan Street.
- Syrian American Medical Centre on Al Luqta Street.
- Dar Mona Hassan Al Benali Quran Learning for Women on Sahat Al Beday Street.
- Ministry of Education Training Centre on Uhud Street.
- Hejen Racing Committee, the country's camel racing authority, has its headquarters on Al Diyaa Street.
- Al Luqta Weaponry Museum on Al Maha Street. The Weaponry Museum features around 2,300 distinct firearms, swords and daggers, some of which belong to former members of the ruling family of Qatar. Also included among the exhibits are weapons dating back to the Ottoman era and Persian-style rifles.
- Al Luqta Children's Park on the corner of Al Maha Street and Al Najah Street. It has two playgrounds, a cafeteria, a prayer room, and an administrative building.

== Embassies ==
- (United States) U.S. Embassy in Qatar

== Education ==
The following schools are located in Al Luqta:

Name of School	Curriculum	Grade	Genders	Official Website	Ref
Omar Bin Al Khattab Secondary School	Qatari	Secondary	Male-only	N/A	
Tunisian School in Doha	Tunisian	Kindergarten – Secondary	Both	Official website	
Royal Kids Nursery	British	Kindergarten	Both	N/A	
Swiss International School of Qatar	Swiss	Kindergarten – Secondary	Both	Official website	
The Syrian School in Qatar	Syrian	Kindergarten – Secondary	Both	N/A	
Al Furqan Elementary Boys School	Qatari	Primary	Male-only	N/A	
Al Furqan Preparatory Boys School	Qatari	Secondary	Male-only	N/A	
