= Owen Emeka =

Spanish footballer

Personal information
- Full name: Owen Mira Chukwuemeka
- Date of birth: 18 April 2009 (age 17)
- Place of birth: Málaga, Spain
- Position: Winger

Team information
- Current team: Granada
- Number: 36

Youth career
- 2016–2019: Atlético Benamiel
- 2019–2023: Tiro Pichón
- 2023–2024: 26 de Febrero
- 2024–2026: Granada

Senior career*
Years	Team	Apps	(Gls)
2025–	Granada B	12	(0)
2026–	Granada	2	(0)

International career
2026–	Spain U17	2	(0)
- * Club domestic league appearances and goals as of 24 August 2026

Owen Mira Chukwuemeka (born 18 April 2009), known as Owen Emeka or just Emeka, is a Spanish professional footballer who plays as a winger for Segunda División club Granada.

== Club career ==
Born in Málaga, Andalusia to a Spanish father and a Nigerian mother, Emeka began his career with local side Atlético Benamiel CF, and subsequently represented CD Tiro Pichón and CD 26 de Febrero before joining Granada's youth sides in 2024. He made his senior debut with the reserves on 7 September 2025, coming on as a half-time substitute in a 1–1 Tercera Federación home draw against Martos CD.

On 29 April 2026, after impressing with the Juvenil squad, Emeka renewed his contract with the Nazaríes until 2031. He made his professional debut on 15 August, replacing fellow youth graduate Sergio Rodelas in a 0–0 away draw against Real Oviedo.

== International career ==
On 21 April 2026, Emeka was called up to the Spain national under-17 team for two friendlies against Ukraine.
