= Al Rayyan (city) =

Al-Rayyan الريان
- City
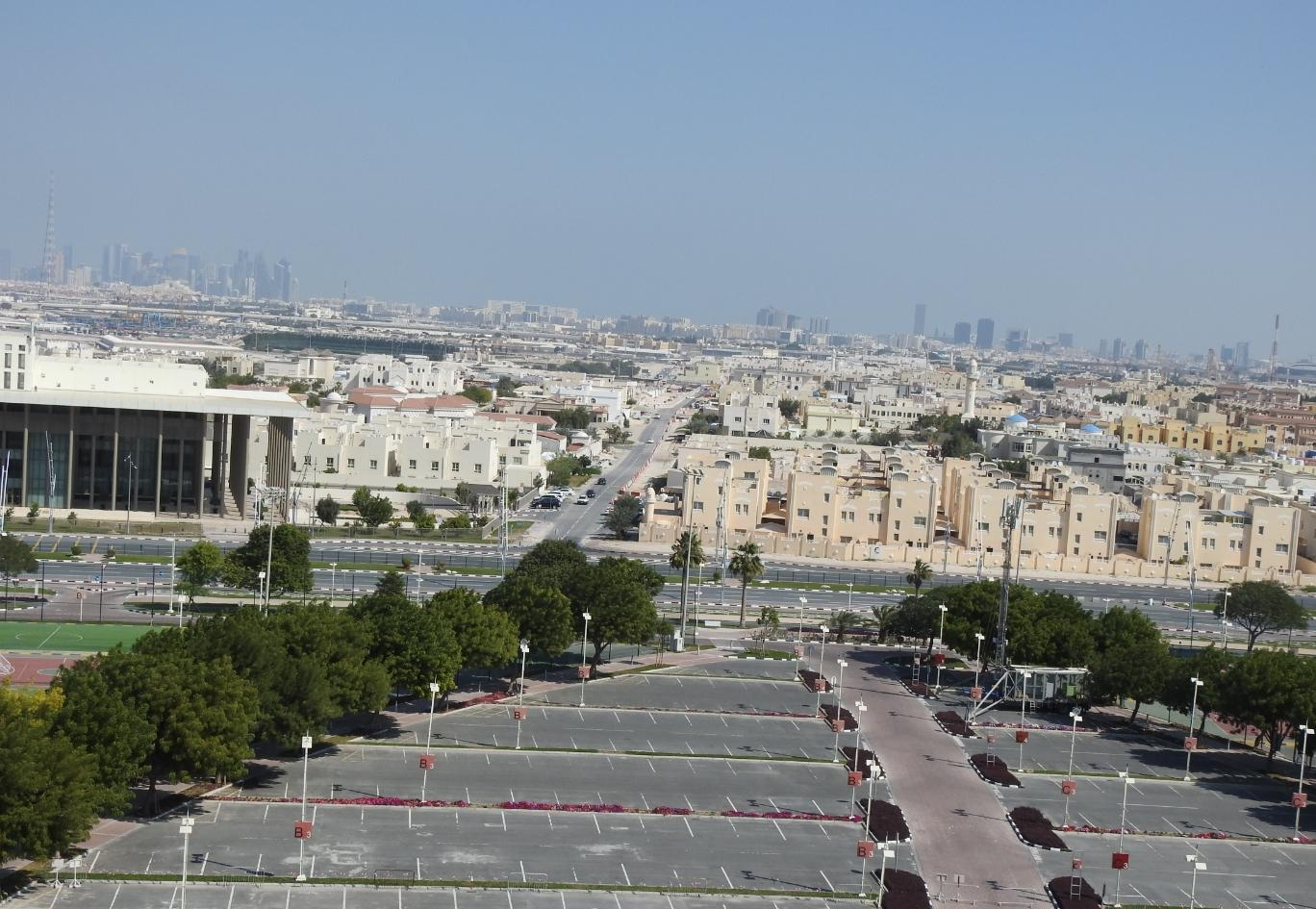
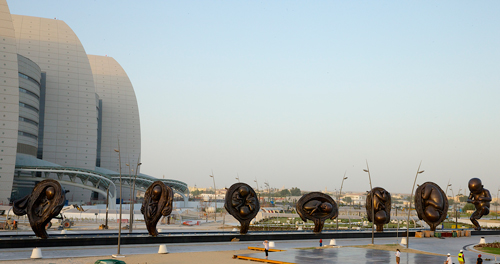
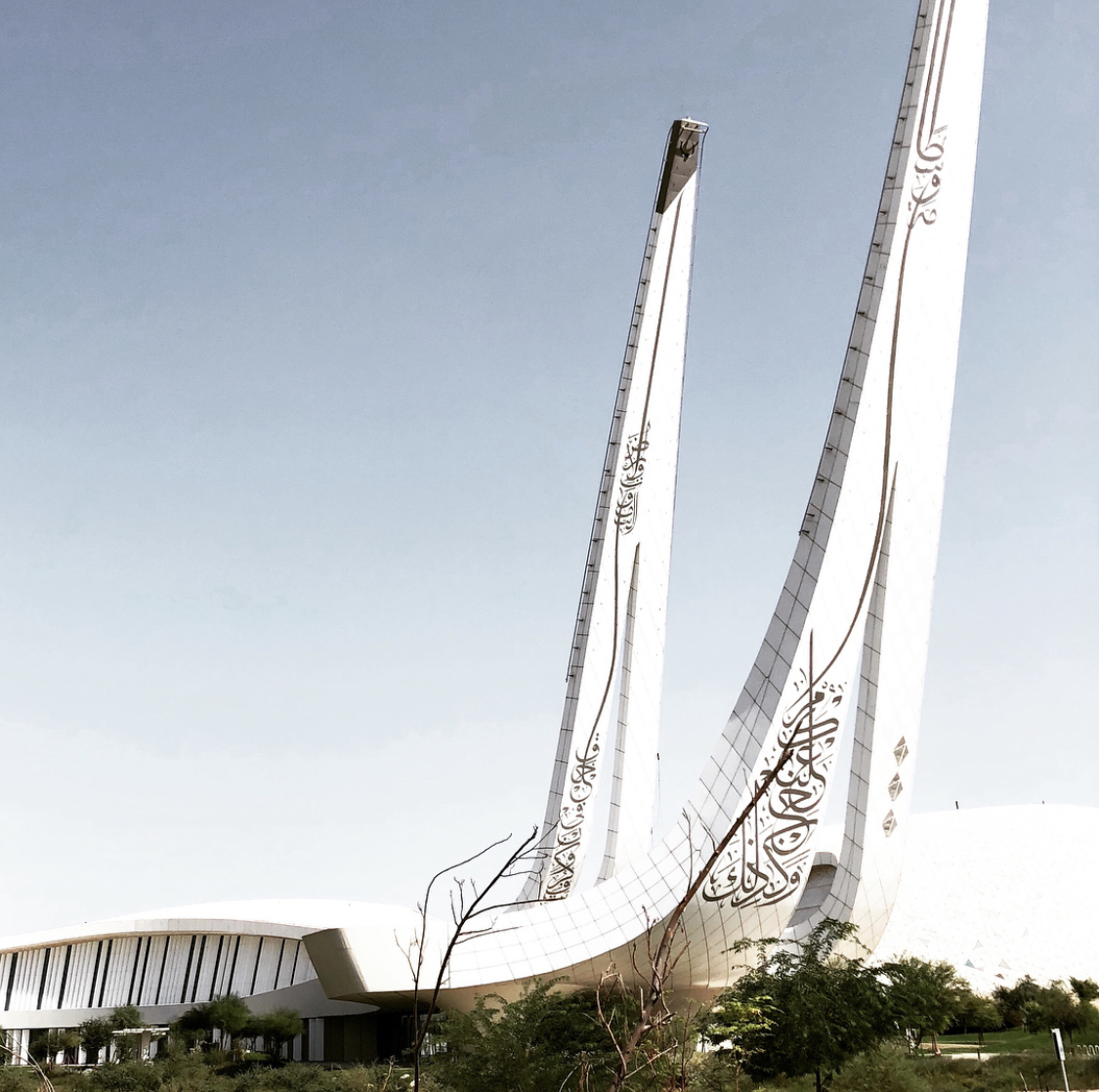
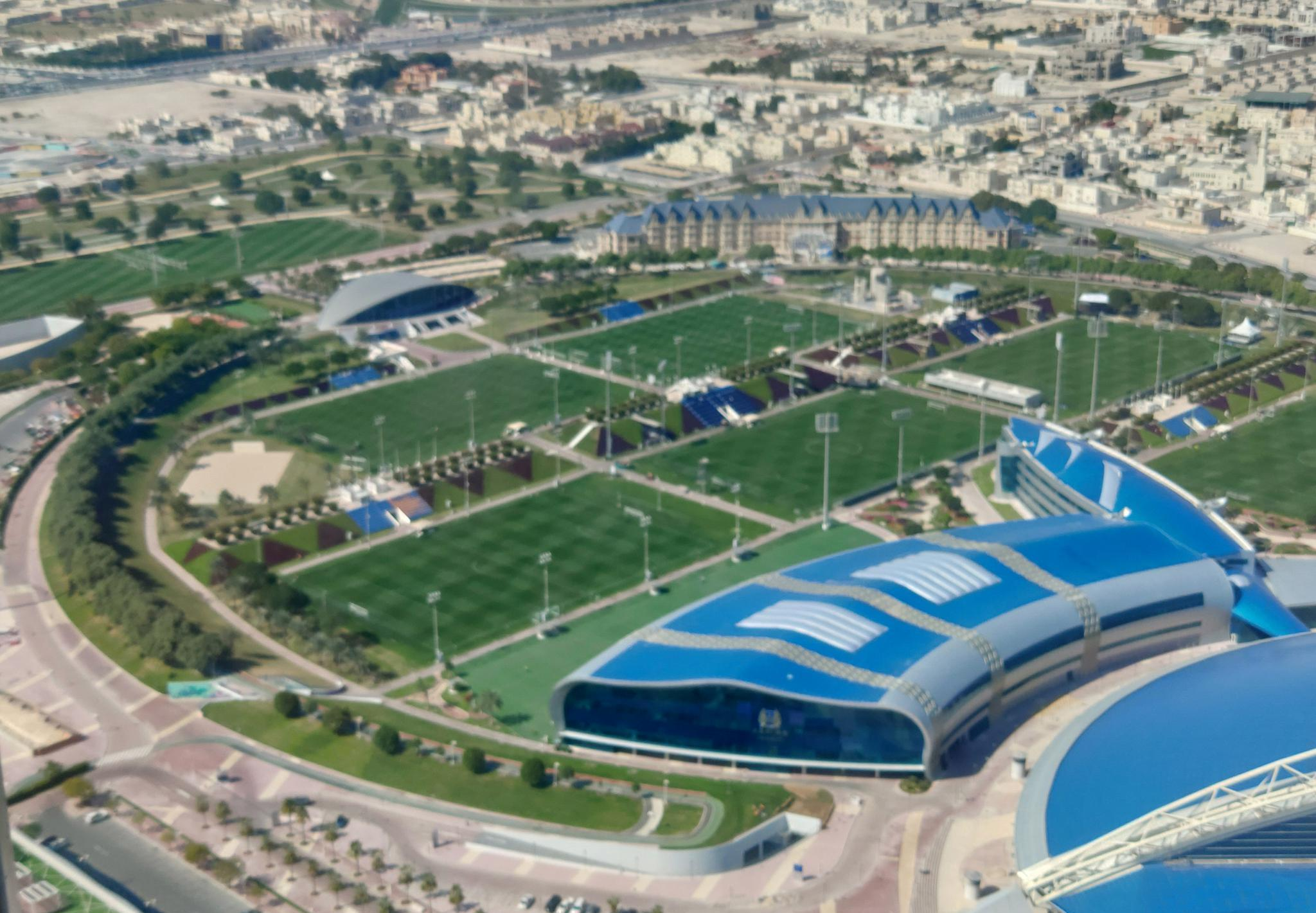
- Mehairja district Qatar National Convention Centre Aspire Tower Qatar National Library Sidra Medical and Research Center Education City Mosque Aspire Zone

- Al Rayyan City
- Coordinates: 25°15′N 51°24′E
- Country: Qatar
- Municipality: Al Rayyan
- Zone: Zone 52 (Old Al Rayyan) / Zone 53 (New Al Rayyan)
- District no.: 61 (Old Al Rayyan) / 65 (New Al Rayyan)

Area
  - Total: 11.9 km^{2} (4.6 sq mi)
- Elevation: 31 m (102 ft)

Al-Rayyan (Arabic: الريان) located in the similarly named municipality of Al Rayyan, is the second-largest city in Qatar. The city and its suburbs comprise the largest population center in Qatar outside of Doha proper, which is immediately to the east of Al Rayyan. Consisting of all of the districts in the municipality's easternmost section, its western boundary is roughly where the Al Majd Highway runs through the municipality. The city is a part of the Doha Metropolitan Area. It was one of the venues for the 2022 FIFA World Cup.

== Etymology ==
The city's name derives from the Arabic word ray, which translates to "irrigation". It was given this name due to its low elevation, allowing it to act as a flood plain during the rainy season and provide a prolonged supply of water to the numerous wild plants and crops that grew in the area.

== History ==
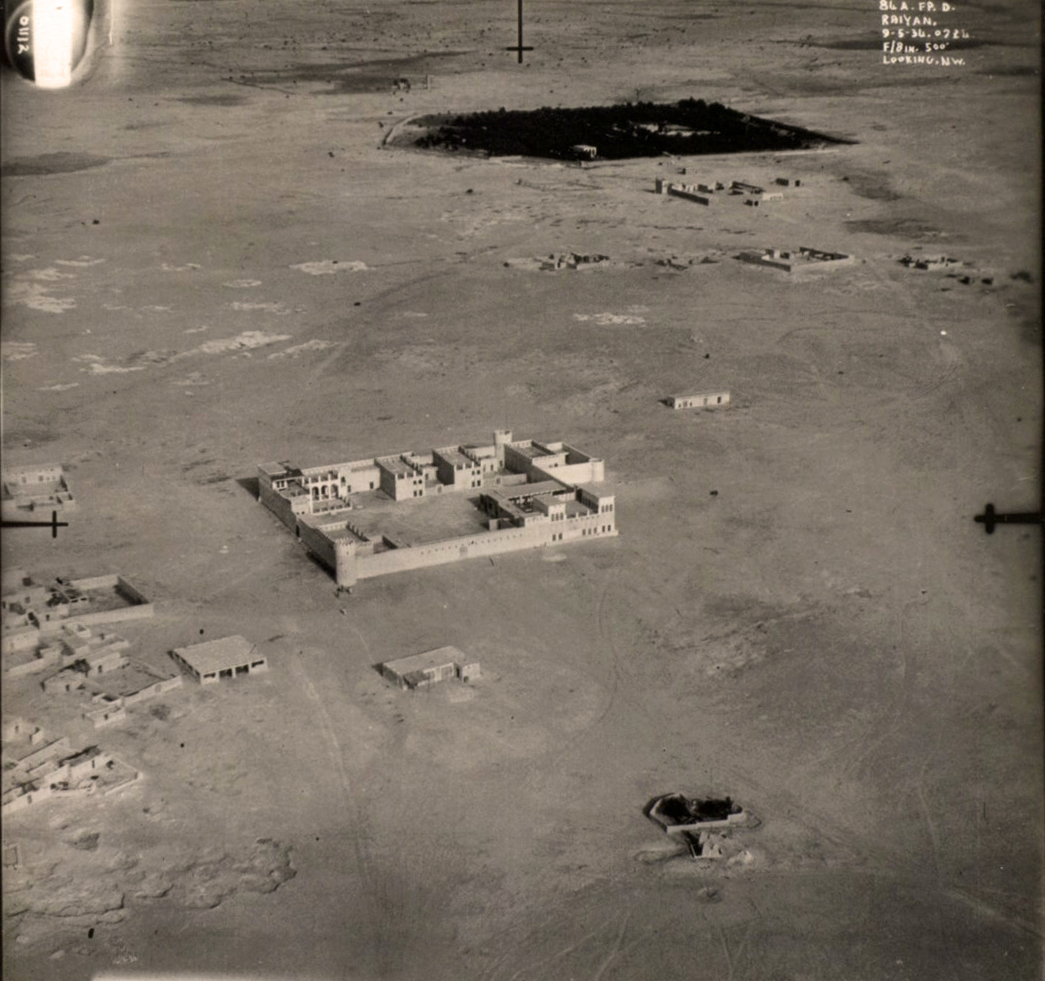
An aerial photograph of Al Rayyan taken by the Royal Air Force during a reconnaissance on 9 May 1934.

Before the massive expansion of Al Rayyan City, the two main areas in Al Rayyan were Old Al Rayyan and New Al Rayyan. Old Al Rayyan consisted of many traditional villages, while New Al Rayyan contained many large villas occupied by members of Qatar's ruling family. As Al Rayyan City grew in the later 20th century, all of the municipality's eastern settlements were incorporated as districts in the city.

Al Rayyan joined the UNESCO Global Network of Learning Cities in 2022.

== Administration ==
=== Districts ===
Two main areas define the city's historical center: Old Al Rayyan (Arabic: الريان القديم; translit. Al Rayyan Al Qadeem') in the northern section, and New Al Rayyan (Arabic: الريان الجديد; translit. Al Rayyan Al Jadeed) in the south. As for the city proper, several districts of Al Rayyan City are designated by the Ministry of Municipality and Environment, including:

- Abu Hamour
- Al Aziziya
- Al Gharrafa
- Al Luqta
- Al Waab
- Al Wajbah
- Gharrafat Al Rayyan
- Muraikh
- Luaib
- Mehairja
- Baaya
- Muaither

=== Central Municipal Council ===
When free elections of the Central Municipal Council first took place in Qatar during 1999, Al Rayyan City was divided into two constituencies: no. 18, which had New Al Rayyan as its seat, and no. 19, which had Old Al Rayyan as its seat. These two constituencies would remain independent of each other for the next three consecutive elections until the fifth municipal elections in 2015, when they were merged under constituency no. 14, with New Al Rayyan as the seat. Also included in its constituency is Al Luqta, Lebday, and Al Shagub.

In the inaugural municipal elections in 1999, voter turnout was 78.3% in constituency no. 18 where Mohammed Hamoud Al Shafi was elected, receiving 37.9%, or 256 votes. In constituency no. 19, Mohammed Saleh Al-Marri won, receiving 66%, or 264 votes. Voter turnout was low, at 37.7% At the next elections, held in 2002, Al Shafi retained his seat in constituency no. 19 while Faraj Saeed Al Aweer was elected in no. 18. In the next election in 2007, Al Shafi once again retained his post in constituency no. 19 whereas Hamad Hamad Al Haoul won the elections in no. 18. The 2011 elections saw both Al Shafi and Haoul retain their seats in their respective constituencies. For the 2015 elections, after the two constituencies were merged into one, long-time representative of constituency no. 19 Mohammed Hamoud Al Shafi emerged as the election winner.

== Landmarks ==
=== City proper ===
Khalifa International Stadium, one of the first large-scale stadiums in Qatar, was built in Al Rayyan City in 1976. It was later incorporated in the Aspire Zone. The Aspire Zone is located in the Al Waab district and accommodates Aspire Academy. Also found within the Al Waab area are Villaggio Mall and Doha Zoo.

Education City, Qatar Science & Technology Park and other Qatar Foundation facilities are located in the Al Gharrafa, Gharrafat Al Rayyan and Al Shagub districts of Al Rayyan.

=== Old Al Rayyan ===
The Municipal Headquarters is based out of the Old Al Rayyan district, as is the Al Rayyan Security Department and the Al Rayyan Pediatric Emergency Center. On 4 October, 1982, the Al Rayyan Public Library was officially inaugurated in Old Al Rayyan by the Minister of Education, Mohammed bin Hamad bin Abdullah Al Thani.

=== New Al Rayyan ===
Qatar Equestrian Federation headquarters in New Al Rayyan.

In the New Al Rayyan district, the Qatar Equestrian Federation (QEF) maintains its stables and outdoor arena. Founded in 1975 and boasting a spectator capacity of 1,500, the QEF arena is considered to be the country's main horse racing venue. The New Al Rayyan Park was opened in 2004 in a residential zone on Al Atouriya Street. Covering an area of 8,827 m^{2}, facilities in the park include a children's play area and a cafeteria while plants featured include numerous date palms.

== Sports ==
Education City Stadium, a 2022 FIFA World Cup venue, has been built in the city. It has a seating capacity of 40,000 spectators and has built in solar panels on its roof. It hosted 8 games of the 2022 FIFA World Cup and was opened on 15 June 2020.

Ahmad bin Ali Stadium and Khalifa International Stadium were rebuilt in the city to host matches for the 2022 FIFA World Cup. Their capacity during the tournament were 45,032 and 45,857 spectators. Ahmad bin Ali Stadium hosted 7 games of the 2022 FIFA World Cup and Khalifa International Stadium hosted 8 games.

In the city there is also Jassim bin Hamad Stadium with the 15,000 capacity. All four stadiums were used for the 2023 AFC Asian Cup.

The city will host matches for the 2027 FIBA Basketball World Cup.

== Transport ==
The underground Al Shaqab station currently serves the Green Line of the Doha Metro. It is located on Huwar Street in Old Al Rayyan, near its border with Al Shagub. The station was opened to the public on 10 December, 2019 along with the other Green Line stations. The station currently has no metrolinks. Facilities on the premises include restrooms and a prayer room.

Another station which serves Al Rayyan and is also a part of the Green Line is the Al Rayyan Al Qadeem station. It is situated in the neighboring Lebday district near the border with Old Al Rayyan.

== Twin towns and sister cities ==
Al Rayyan is twinned with:

- Mogilev, Belarus (since 2010)
