= Simón Escobar =

Argentine footballer (born 2009)

Personal information
- Full name: Simón Valentín Escobar
- Date of birth: 17 July 2009 (age 17)
- Place of birth: Merlo, Argentina
- Height: 1.85 m (6 ft 1 in)
- Position: Defender

Team information
- Current team: Vélez
- Number: 18

Youth career
- Vélez

Senior career*
Years	Team	Apps	(Gls)
2026–	Vélez	1	(0)

International career^{‡}
2025	Argentina U16	1	(1)
2025–	Argentina U17	10	(1)
- * Club domestic league appearances and goals ‡ National team caps and goals as of 19 April 2026

Simón Valentín Escobar (born 17 July 2009) is an Argentine professional footballer who plays as a defender for Vélez.

== Early life ==
Escobar was born on 17 July 2009. Born in Merlo, Argentina, he is a native of the city.

== Club career ==
As a youth player, Escobar the youth academy of Vélez. Ahead of the 2026 season, he was promoted to the club's senior team.

== International career ==
Escobar is an Argentina youth international. During the autumn of 2025, he played for the Argentina national under-17 football team at the 2025 FIFA U-17 World Cup.
