= Aspire Zone =

Sports complex in Al Rayyan, Qatar

Coordinates: 25°15′49″N 51°26′53″E

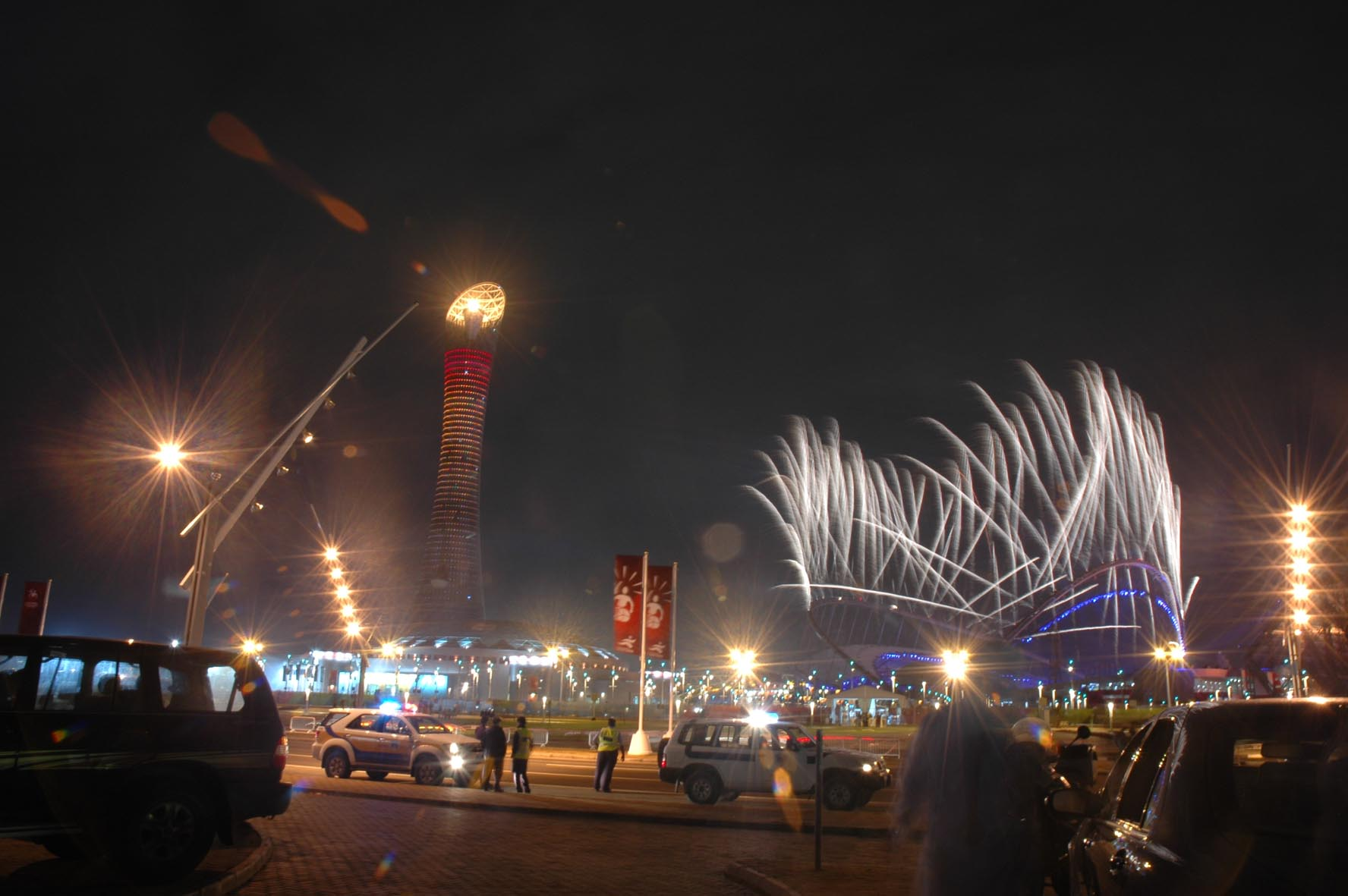
Overview of the complex during the 2006 Asian Games Opening Ceremony

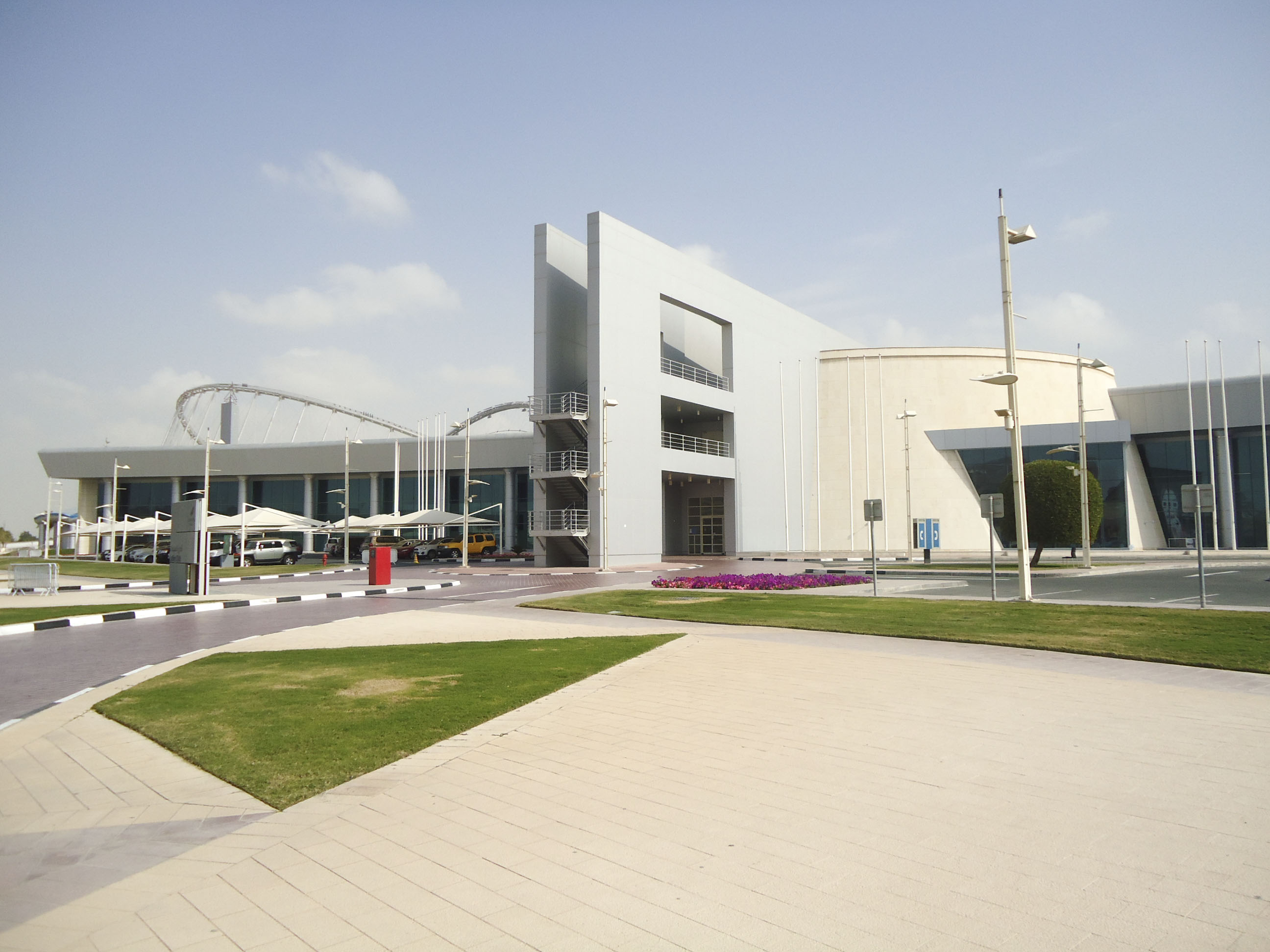
Ladies Club in Aspire Zone

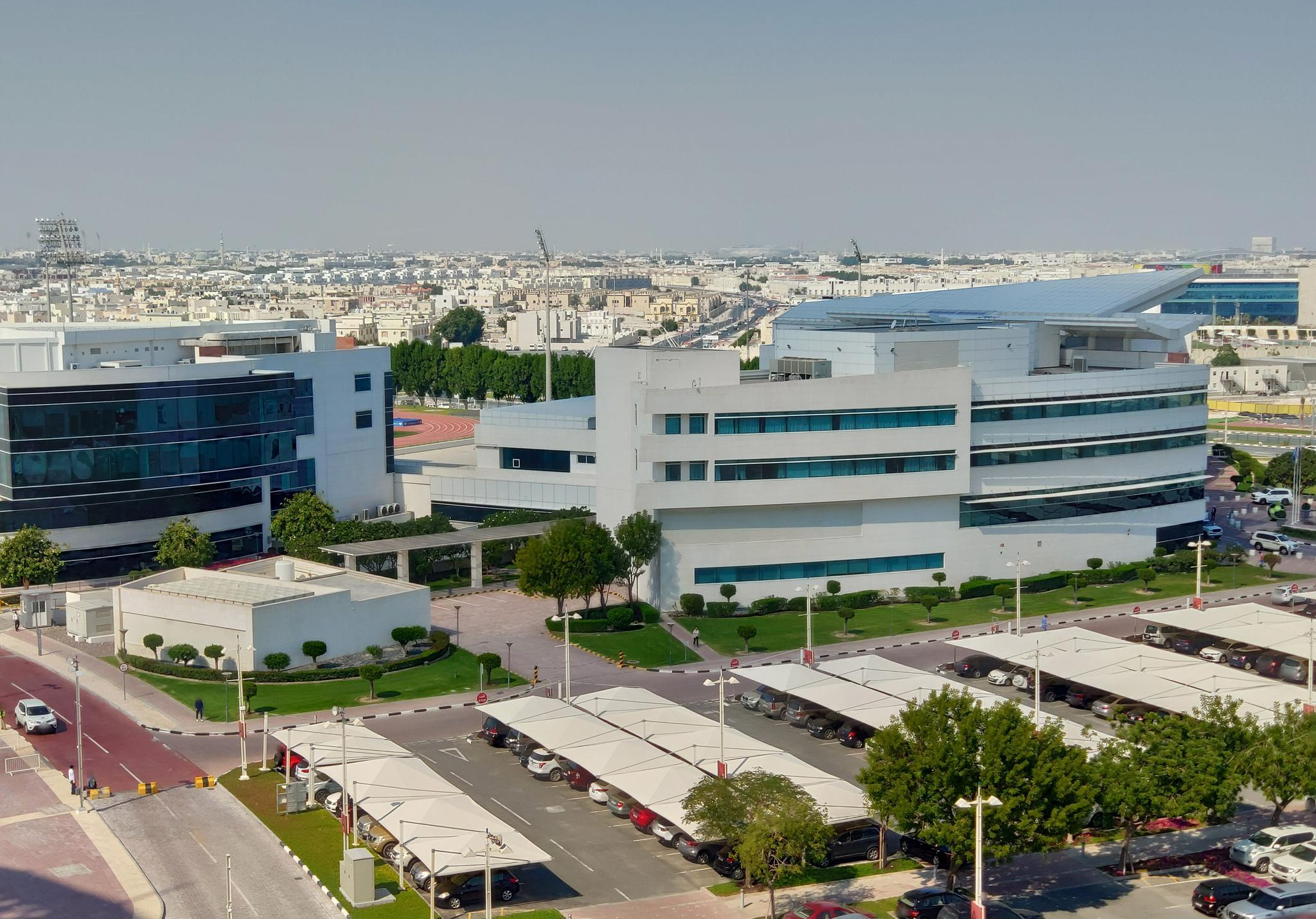
Aerial view of Aspetar

Aspire Zone, also known as Doha Sports City, is a 250-hectare (2.5 km^{2}) sporting complex located in the Baaya district of Al Rayyan, Qatar. Owned by the Aspire Zone Foundation, it was established as an international sports destination in 2003 and in the following year an educational centre for the development of sporting champions (Aspire Academy) was opened. The complex contains several sporting venues, mostly constructed in preparation for the 2006 Asian Games.

Aspire Zone is also home to Qatar's former tallest structure, the Aspire Tower, and is adjacent to Villaggio Mall.

The complex was an important feature in the 2022 FIFA World Cup bid submitted by the Qatar Football Association, and was central to the Doha bid for the 2016 Summer Olympics put forward by the Qatar Olympic Committee.

In 2024, the Aspire Zone Foundation created the Equality Cup, an international football tournament.

== Sporting venues ==
Aspire Zone's sporting venues include:

- Khalifa International Stadium, a 50,000-capacity stadium primarily used for football matches.
- Hamad Aquatic Center, an Olympic-size swimming pool.
- The Aspire Dome, which is the world's largest indoor multi-purpose sports hall and contains 13 different playing fields.

== Aspire Academy ==
Aspire Academy, a sporting academy for youth, is located in the center of Aspire Zone.

== Aspetar ==
Aspetar, a specialised orthopaedic and sports medicine hospital, is among the facilities of Aspire Zone. Commencing operations in 2007, it was the first-ever sports medicine hospital in the Middle East region. It earned accreditation as a FIFA Medical Centre of Excellence in 2009. The hospital publishes a journal entitled Aspetar Sports Medicine Journal.
