= Muraikh =

Muraikh مريخ
- District
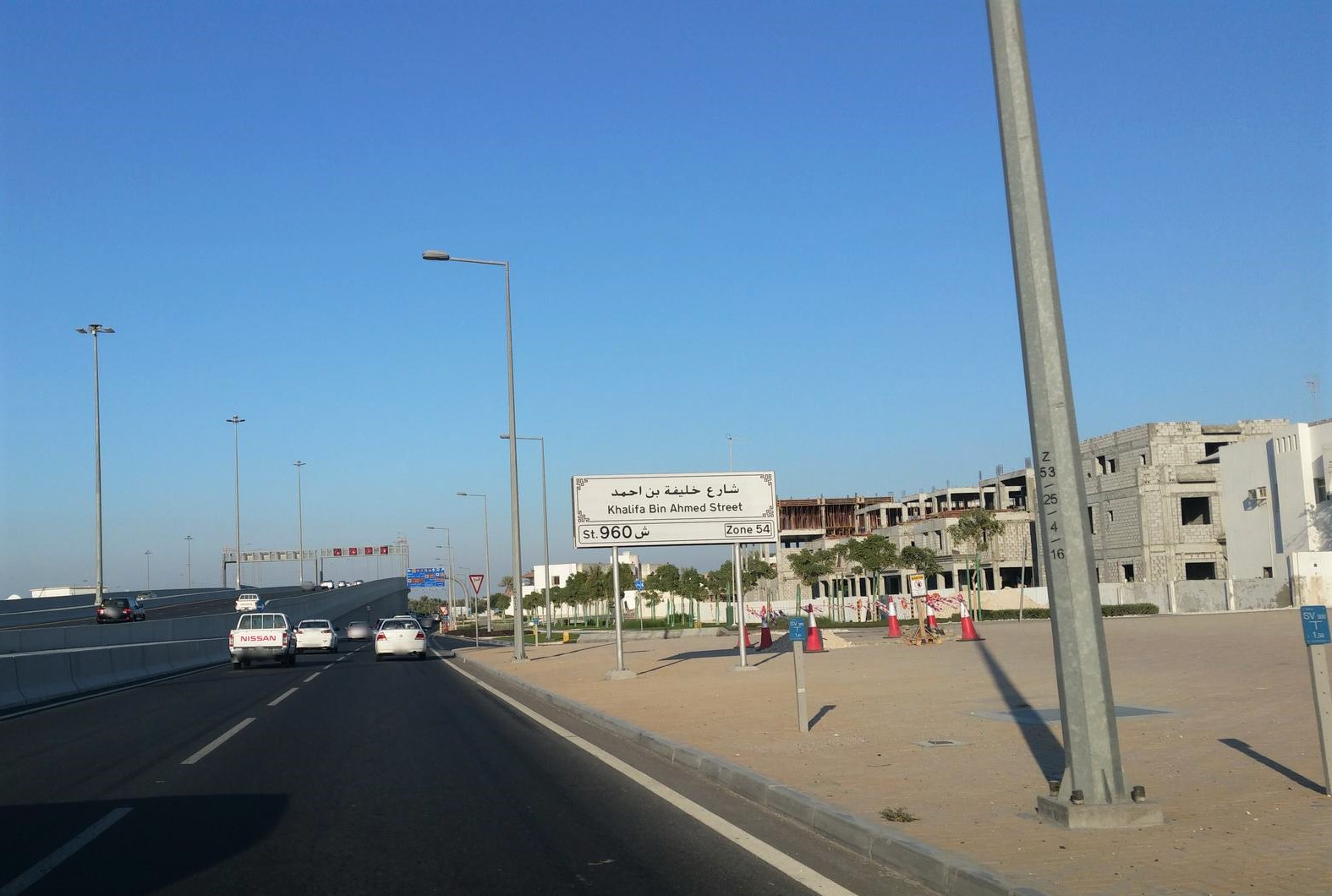
- Khalifa Bin Ahmed Street in Muraikh

- Location within Qatar
- Coordinates: 25°17′00″N 51°27′00″E
- Country: Qatar
- Municipality: Al Rayyan
- Zone: Zone 54
- District no.: 78

Area
  - Total: 3.4 km^{2} (1.3 sq mi)
- Elevation: 23 m (75 ft)

Muraikh (Arabic: مريخ) is a district of Al Rayyan City in the municipality of Al Rayyan in Qatar.

== Etymology ==
The district derives its name from markh (Leptadenia pyrotechnica), the local term used for a tree that grows abundantly in the area.

== History ==
In 1908, J.G. Lorimer documented Muraikh in the Gazetteer of the Persian Gulf, giving its location as "9 miles west by south of Dohah". He mentioned the presence of a masonry well, 2 fathoms deep, which yielded good water.

== Administration ==
When free elections of the Central Municipal Council first took place in Qatar during 1999, Muraikh was designated the constituency seat of constituency no. 16. It would remain constituency seat in the next three consecutive elections until the fifth municipal elections in 2015, when it was made part of constituency no. 5. In the inaugural municipal elections in 1999, Nasser Fallah Al Dosari won the elections, receiving 40.4%, or 201 votes. Trailing behind Al Dosari was Ali Salem Al Suwaidi, who attained 34.5%, or 172 votes. Salem Mohammed Al Nabat won the 2002 elections. In the third municipal elections in 2007, Mohammed Salem Al Qamra was elected constituency representative. Al Qamra successfully retained his seat in the 2011 elections.

== Landmarks ==
- Qatar Driving Learning Institute on Mohmmed bin Ahmed Street.
- Social Security Section of the Ministry of Social Affairs on Al Furousiya Street.
- Muraikh Valley Compound on Al Furousiya Street.

== Education ==
The Dawhat Al Khair Centre for Quran Learning and Science is positioned inside the district.

The following schools are located in Muraikh:

| Name of School | Curriculum | Grade | Genders | Ref |
|---|---|---|---|---|
| Al-Mujtama Girls School | Independent | Kindergarten – Secondary | Female-only | |
| Apple Tree Nursery Aspire Branch | British | Kindergarten | Both | |
| Omar Bin Al Khattab Primary First | Independent | Primary | Male-only | |
| Palestinian School for Boys | Palestinian | Kindergarten – Secondary | Male-only | |
