= Baaya =

Baaya بعيا
- District
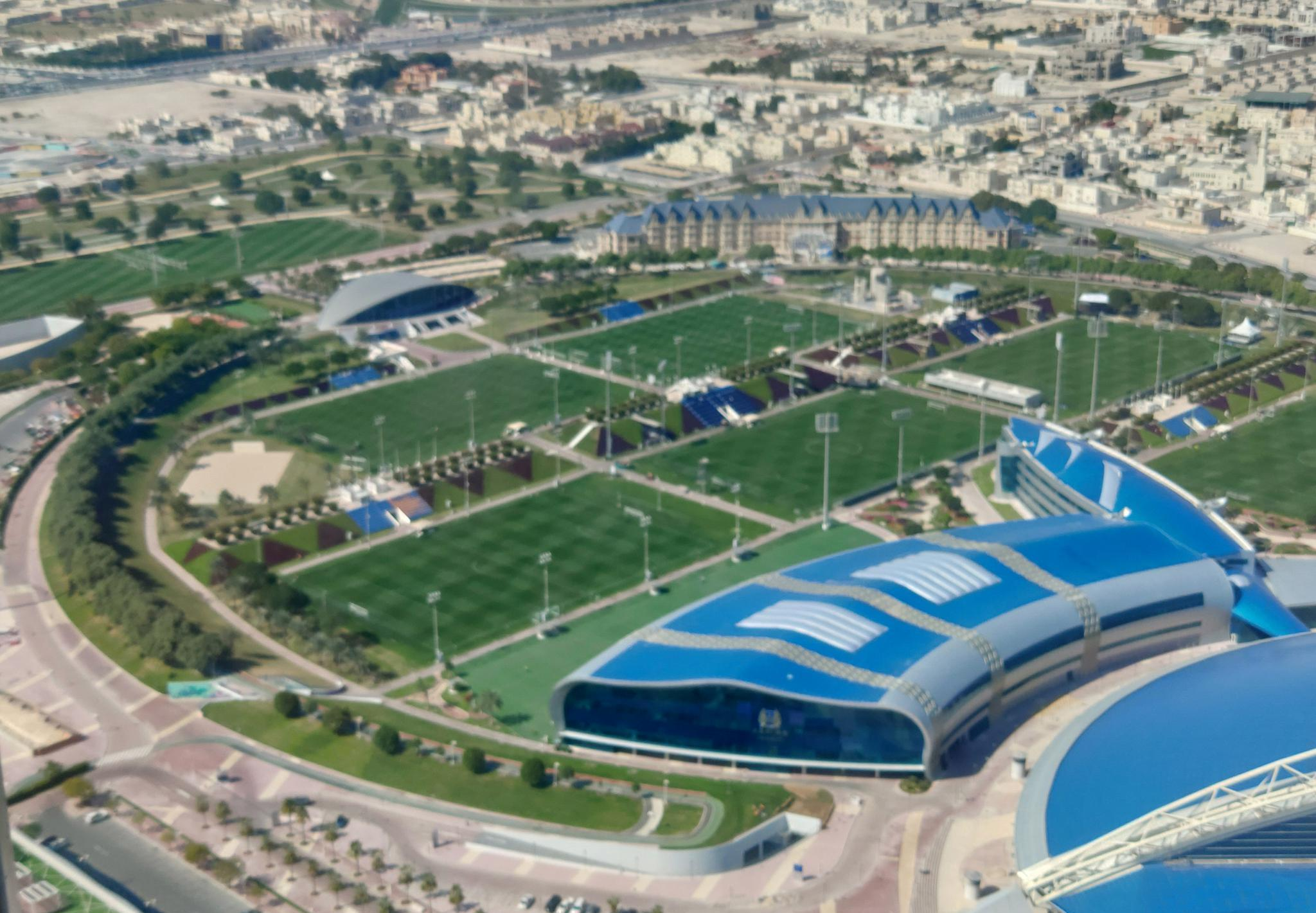
- Aerial view of Aspire Academy in the Aspire Zone

- Location within Qatar
- Coordinates: 25°16′03″N 51°26′33″E
- Country: Qatar
- Municipality: Al Rayyan
- Zone: Zone 54
- District no.: 82

Area
  - Total: 4.7 km^{2} (1.8 sq mi)

Baaya (Arabic: بعيا; also spelled as Baaja) is a district in the municipality of Al Rayyan in Qatar. It is one of the more developed districts in Al Rayyan, hosting Villaggio Mall, Aspire Park, and the Aspire Zone, all of which run along Al Waab Street.

== Etymology ==
In Arabic, baaja roughly translates to "widened". It was so named because the area comprises a vast, cultivated plain.

== Landmarks ==
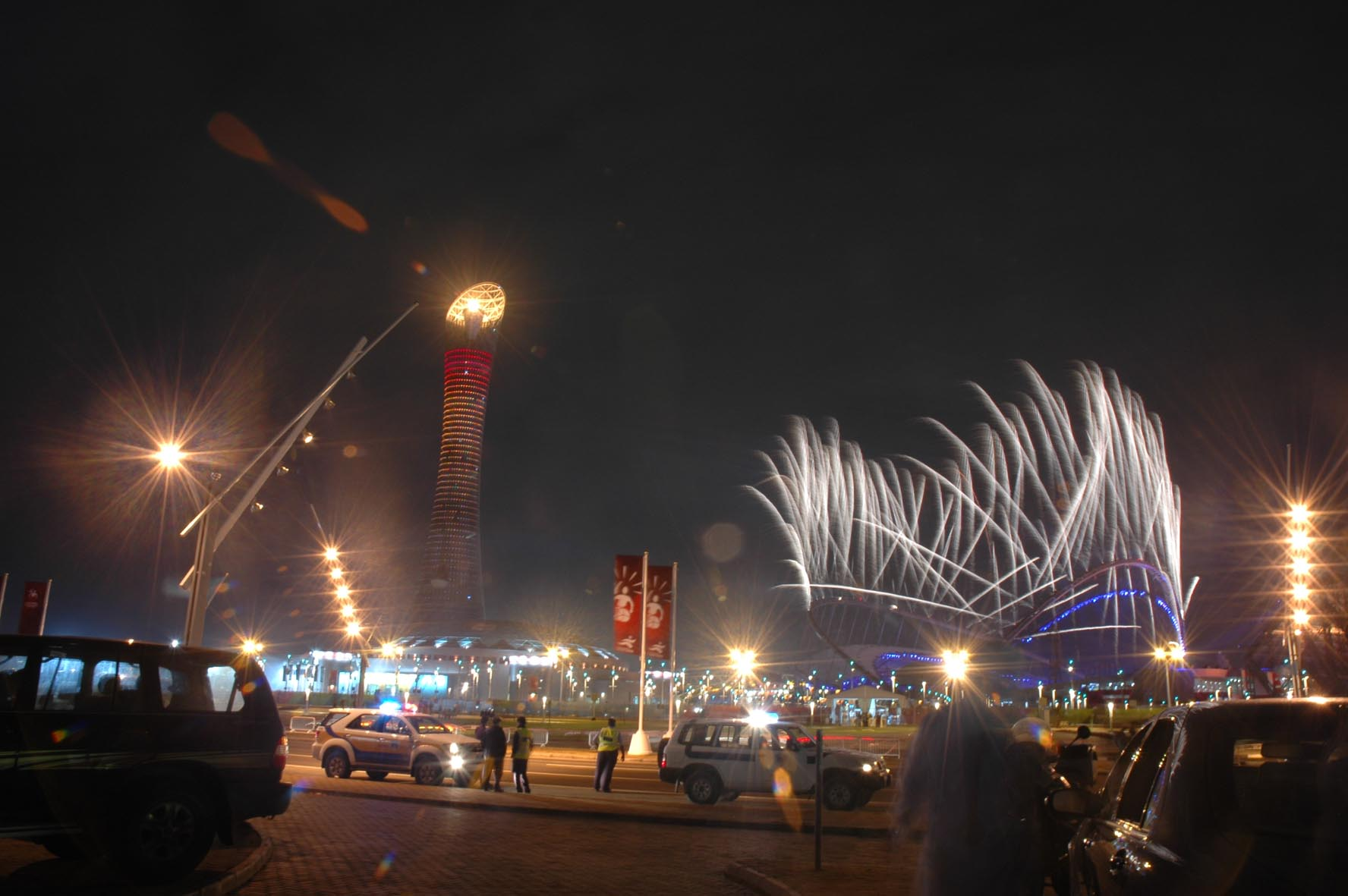
Doha Sports City during the 2006 Asian Games Opening Ceremony.

- Al Rayyan Pediatric Emergency Center on Al Fourisiya Street.
- Rayyan Electricity Standby Office (Kahramaa) on Al Fourisiya Street.
- University of Calgary in Qatar on Al Sail Street.

=== Aspire Zone ===
Key locations in the district are mainly located in the Aspire Zone which runs along Al Waab Street, including the Doha Sports City, home to many of the venues of the 2006 Asian Games, Qatar's former tallest structure, Aspire Tower and Qatar's largest stadium, Khalifa Stadium, as well as one of Qatar's most popular malls, Villagio Mall, themed after the Italian city of Venice. Aspetar, a specialized orthopaedic and sports medicine hospital, is also based in the Aspire Zone. The Aspire Park is a popular attraction found on Al Waab Street.

Roughly half of the district's overall area is occupied by the Aspire Zone.

== Transport ==
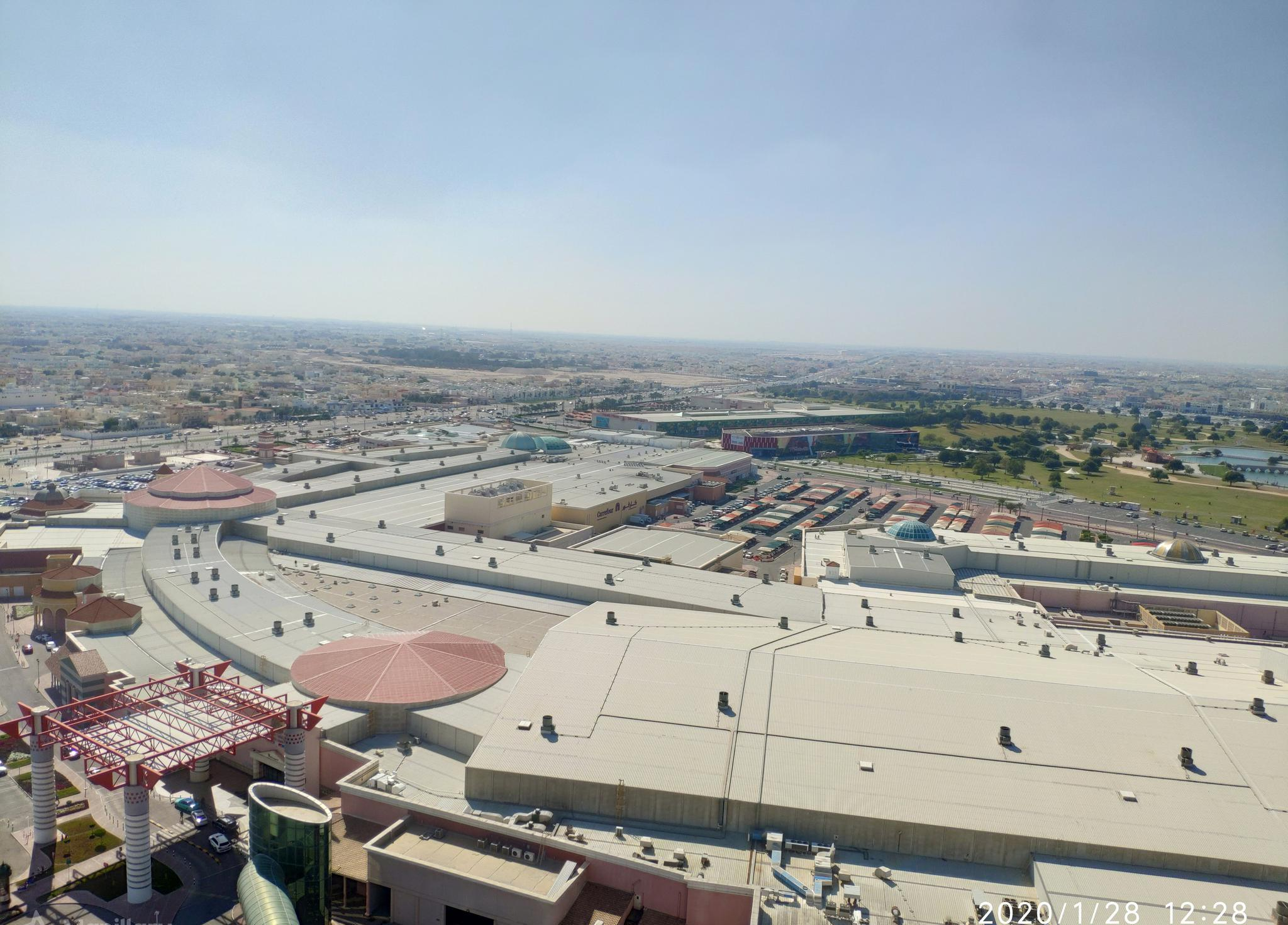
Overhead view of Villagio Mall and Aspire Park.

=== Road ===
The two most important roads which run through the district are Al Waab Street, which is the commercial center and which hosts the Aspire Zone, and Al Furousiya Street, which provides connectivity between the southern and northern districts of Al Rayyan.

Five bus stations have been placed within the district. Mowasalat is one of the official transport companies of Qatar and serves the community through its operation of public bus routes.

=== Rail ===
Sports City station currently serves the Gold Line of the Doha Metro. The station was inaugurated on 21 November 2019, along with all other Gold Line stations. It is located on Al Waab Street, between Al Aziziyah station and Al Waab station.

Among the station's facilities are a prayer room and restrooms. Nearby landmarks within walking distance include the Khalifa International Stadium and, further west of the station, the Aspire Zone. There are no metrolinks for the station.

== Education ==
The following schools are located in Baaya:

Name of School	Curriculum	Grade	Genders	Ref
Abdullah bin Zaid Al-Mahmoud Boys Model Independent	Independent	Kindergarten – Primary	Male-only	
Al-Mujtama Preparatory Secondary Private	Independent	Primary – Secondary	Female-only	
