= 2026 FIFA U-17 World Cup squads =

Football tournament squads

The following is a list of squads for each national team competing at the 2026 FIFA U-17 World Cup. The tournament is taking place in Qatar, from 19 November to 13 December 2026. It is the 21st annual international world youth football championship organised by FIFA for the under-17 national teams.

Players born between 1 January 2009 and 31 December 2011 are eligible to compete in the tournament. Each team has to register a squad of 21 players, minimum three of whom have to be goalkeepers (regulation article 26.1). The final squads were confirmed by FIFA on 11 November 2026. The full squad listings are below.

The age listed for each player is their age as of 19 November 2026, the first day of the tournament. The club listed is the club for which the player last played a competitive match prior to the tournament. The nationality for each club reflects the national association (not the league) to which the club is affiliated. A flag is included for coaches who are of a different nationality to their team.

== Group A ==
=== Egypt ===
Head coach: Hussein Abdel-Latif

No.	Pos.	Player	Date of birth (age)	Club
1	GK	Mohamed Ebied	3 May 2010 (aged 16)	(Egyptian Football Association) Al Ahly
2	DF	Mohamed Deizl	15 August 2009 (aged 17)	(Egyptian Football Association) Al Ahly
3	DF	Adam Youssef	17 October 2009 (aged 17)	(Egyptian Football Association) Al Ahly
4	GK	Abdelaziz Mahmoud	23 February 2009 (aged 17)	(Egyptian Football Association) Pharco
5	FW	Ezzat Mohamed	20 April 2009 (aged 17)	(Egyptian Football Association) Zamalek
6	DF	Adel Alaa	9 September 2009 (aged 17)	(Egyptian Football Association) Ghazl El Mahalla
7	FW	Mohamed Gamal	12 December 2009 (aged 16)	(Egyptian Football Association) ENPPI
8	MF	Ahmed Beshir	1 September 2009 (aged 17)	(Egyptian Football Association) Ceramica Cleopatra
9	FW	Adham Hasseib	1 August 2009 (aged 17)	(Egyptian Football Association) Zamalek
10	FW	Ahmed Safwat	23 March 2009 (aged 17)	(Egyptian Football Association) Zamalek
11	FW	Daniel Tamer	25 June 2009 (aged 17)	(Egyptian Football Association) ZED
12	DF	Amier Hassan	18 January 2009 (aged 17)	(Royal Dutch Football Association) NEC Nijmegen
13	FW	Abdelaziz Evona	13 January 2009 (aged 17)	(Egyptian Football Association) Al Ahly
14	FW	Ziad Souidi	24 May 2009 (aged 17)	(Egyptian Football Association) Pyramids
15	MF	Omar Abdelrahim	27 April 2009 (aged 17)	(Egyptian Football Association) Al Ahly
16	GK	Malek Amr	4 May 2009 (aged 17)	(Egyptian Football Association) Zamalek
17	FW	Khaled Abouelrokab	25 May 2009 (aged 17)	(Egyptian Football Association) Al Ahly
18	FW	Saif Karim	15 March 2009 (aged 17)	(Egyptian Football Association) Al Ahly
19	FW	Khaled Mokhtar	13 January 2009 (aged 17)	(Egyptian Football Association) ZED
20	FW	Amir Abou Elezz	11 June 2009 (aged 17)	(Italian Football Federation) Monza
21	MF	Yousef Abdullah	1 February 2009 (aged 17)	(Egyptian Football Association) Al Ahly

=== Greece ===
Head coach: Vasilios Papadakis

No.	Pos.	Player	Date of birth (age)	Club
1	GK	Christos Geitonas	28 September 2009 (aged 17)	(Hellenic Football Federation) Panathinaikos
2	DF	Georgios Siozios	11 February 2009 (aged 17)	(Hellenic Football Federation) Olympiacos
3	DF	Konstantinos Karangelis	7 June 2009 (aged 17)	(German Football Association) VfB Stuttgart
4	DF	Vasileios Lavdas	22 January 2009 (aged 17)	(Hellenic Football Federation) Panathinaikos
5	DF	Athanasios Filippiadis	16 February 2009 (aged 17)	(Hellenic Football Federation) AEK Athens
6	MF	Panagiotis Biniaris	25 July 2009 (aged 17)	(Hellenic Football Federation) Panathinaikos
7	FW	Iason Nempis	9 February 2009 (aged 17)	(Hellenic Football Federation) Panathinaikos
8	MF	Konstantinos Papadakis	27 April 2009 (aged 17)	(Hellenic Football Federation) OFI
9	FW	Konstantinos Souvlatzis	31 August 2009 (aged 17)	(Hellenic Football Federation) PAOK
10	FW	Ioannis Kostoglou	27 June 2009 (aged 17)	(Hellenic Football Federation) PAOK
11	DF	Nikolaos Chaldezos	4 July 2009 (aged 17)	(Hellenic Football Federation) PAOK
12	GK	Georgios Nikolaidis	28 February 2009 (aged 17)	(Hellenic Football Federation) PAOK
13	GK	Vasileios Branis	26 October 2009 (aged 17)	(Hellenic Football Federation) Olympiacos
14	MF	Ioannis Ferraz	28 August 2010 (aged 16)	(Hellenic Football Federation) PAOK
15	DF	Andreas Poulopoulos	31 January 2009 (aged 17)	(German Football Association) Werder Bremen
16	FW	Leonidas Vassiliadis	25 October 2009 (aged 17)	(German Football Association) Fortuna Düsseldorf
17	DF	Stefanos Tsigkas	27 February 2009 (aged 17)	(Hellenic Football Federation) Panathinaikos
18	FW	Argyrios Argyriou	5 March 2009 (aged 17)	(Hellenic Football Federation) AEK Athens
19	DF	Ioannis Psyroukis	7 April 2009 (aged 17)	(Hellenic Football Federation) PAOK
20	MF	Sarafianos Papasarafianos	31 January 2009 (aged 17)	(Hellenic Football Federation) Aris Thessaloniki
21	FW	Alexios Bairamidis	10 November 2009 (aged 17)	(Hellenic Football Federation) Panionios

=== Panama ===
Head coach: Felipe Baloy

No.	Pos.	Player	Date of birth (age)	Club
1	GK	Adamir Aparicio	14 January 2009 (aged 17)	(Panamanian Football Federation) Plaza Amador
2	DF	Anthony Murillo	21 April 2009 (aged 17)	(Panamanian Football Federation) Atlético Nacional
3	DF	Stephen Dominguez	19 January 2009 (aged 17)	(Panamanian Football Federation) Sporting San Miguelito
4	DF	Neir Marrugo	24 November 2010 (aged 15)	(Panamanian Football Federation) Independiente
5	MF	Lucas Norte	16 July 2009 (aged 17)	(Panamanian Football Federation) Plaza Amador
6	MF	Jossimar Insturain	7 June 2009 (aged 17)	(Panamanian Football Federation) Tauro
7	MF	Alexander Tull	20 May 2010 (aged 16)	(Panamanian Football Federation) Independiente
8	MF	Alfredo Maduro	18 March 2010 (aged 16)	(Panamanian Football Federation) Costa del Este
9	FW	Thiago Chalmers	12 December 2009 (aged 16)	(Panamanian Football Federation) Plaza Amador
10	MF	Estevis López	22 October 2009 (aged 17)	(Panamanian Football Federation) Veraguas United
11	MF	Jorge General	11 February 2010 (aged 16)	(Panamanian Football Federation) San Francisco
12	GK	Isaias Abuabara	26 October 2010 (aged 16)	(Royal Spanish Football Federation) Celta Vigo
13	DF	Alberto Adams	9 April 2009 (aged 17)	(Panamanian Football Federation) Plaza Amador
14	MF	Ronaldo Matos	30 May 2009 (aged 17)	(Panamanian Football Federation) Sporting San Miguelito
15	DF	Giancarlo Aleman	18 July 2009 (aged 17)	(Panamanian Football Federation) Plaza Amador
16	FW	Cristián Morán	4 January 2009 (aged 17)	(Panamanian Football Federation) UMECIT
17	MF	Jose Asprilla	31 December 2009 (aged 16)	(Panamanian Football Federation) Universitario
18	MF	Joseph López	18 March 2009 (aged 17)	(Panamanian Football Federation) San Francisco
19	FW	Jorshua Gomez	1 June 2010 (aged 16)	(Panamanian Football Federation) San Francisco
20	MF	Gabriel Quiroz	14 January 2009 (aged 17)	(Panamanian Football Federation) Tauro
21	GK	Luis López	30 October 2009 (aged 17)	(Panamanian Football Federation) Costa del Este

=== Qatar ===
Head coach: (Spain) Álvaro Mejía

No.	Pos.	Player	Date of birth (age)	Club
1	GK	Bakri Mohamed	2 July 2009 (aged 17)	(Qatar Football Association) Al-Rayyan
2	DF	Mateo Esparzaariza	4 January 2009 (aged 17)	(Qatar Football Association) Al-Arabi
3	DF	Adham Adnan	20 January 2010 (aged 16)	(Qatar Football Association) Al Duhail
4	DF	Sami Darani	11 March 2009 (aged 17)	(Qatar Football Association) Al Sadd
5	DF	Taha Nassir	28 October 2009 (aged 17)	(Qatar Football Association) Al Duhail
6	MF	Hadi Khalil	3 November 2009 (aged 17)	(Qatar Football Association) Al Duhail
7	FW	Dhiaeddine Benyatla	2 January 2010 (aged 16)	(Qatar Football Association) Al-Gharafa
8	MF	Mohamed Fadl	10 April 2009 (aged 17)	(Qatar Football Association) Al Sadd
9	FW	Mohsain Alhajri	18 January 2009 (aged 17)	(Qatar Football Association) Al-Rayyan
10	MF	Ahmed Abouelkomsan	5 April 2010 (aged 16)	(Qatar Football Association) Al-Rayyan
11	FW	Kunle Tokode	13 July 2009 (aged 17)	(Qatar Football Association) Al Sadd
12	GK	Husam Haider	24 August 2009 (aged 17)	(Qatar Football Association) Mesaimeer
13	DF	Ghassan Eltoum	2 June 2009 (aged 17)	(Qatar Football Association) Al-Rayyan
14	MF	Omar Ayman	3 March 2010 (aged 16)	(Qatar Football Association) Al Duhail
15	DF	Ali Elnoury	24 January 2009 (aged 17)	(Qatar Football Association) Umm Salal
16	DF	Ahmed Fathy	1 December 2009 (aged 16)	(Qatar Football Association) Al-Arabi
17	FW	Cristiano Soriacabrera	8 July 2009 (aged 17)	(Qatar Football Association) Qatar SC
18	MF	Shaher Roustom	30 December 2009 (aged 16)	(Qatar Football Association) Al Duhail
19	FW	Amr Ezzat	6 May 2009 (aged 17)	(Qatar Football Association) Al Duhail
20	FW	Abdoulaye Ndiaye	24 September 2009 (aged 17)	(Qatar Football Association) Al-Rayyan
21	GK	Mohamed Fadil	14 February 2009 (aged 17)	(Qatar Football Association) Al Duhail

== Group B ==
=== Ecuador ===
No.	Pos.	Player	Date of birth (age)	Club
1	GK	Jefferson Camacho	10 January 2010 (aged 16)	(Ecuadorian Football Federation) Independiente del Valle
2	DF	Deinner Ordóñez	29 October 2010 (aged 16)	(Ecuadorian Football Federation) Independiente del Valle
3	DF	Sergio Gonzalez	16 November 2009 (aged 17)	(Ecuadorian Football Federation) Emelec
4	DF	Nicolas Sotomayor	15 June 2009 (aged 17)	(Ecuadorian Football Federation) Aucas
5	MF	Nixon Ayoy	18 July 2010 (aged 16)	(Ecuadorian Football Federation) Independiente del Valle
6	DF	Jhon Chica	16 October 2009 (aged 17)	(Ecuadorian Football Federation) Emelec
7	FW	Johan Martínez	10 May 2009 (aged 17)	(Ecuadorian Football Federation) Independiente del Valle
8	MF	Brayan Zamora	15 November 2009 (aged 17)	(Ecuadorian Football Federation) Independiente del Valle
9	FW	Jhon Guerrero	14 March 2009 (aged 17)	(Ecuadorian Football Federation) Santo Domingo
10	FW	Holger Quintero	15 August 2009 (aged 17)	(Ecuadorian Football Federation) Independiente del Valle
11	FW	Edwin Quintero	15 August 2009 (aged 17)	(Ecuadorian Football Federation) Independiente del Valle
12	GK	Miguel Vaca	6 November 2009 (aged 17)	(Ecuadorian Football Federation) El Nacional
13	DF	Carlos Medina	2 January 2009 (aged 17)	(Ecuadorian Football Federation) Barcelona S.C.
14	DF	Janer Mina	9 January 2009 (aged 17)	(Ecuadorian Football Federation) L.D.U. Quito
15	MF	Adrián Cuadrado	10 March 2009 (aged 17)	(Royal Spanish Football Federation) FC Barcelona
16	MF	Jordin Mina	24 March 2010 (aged 16)	(Ecuadorian Football Federation) L.D.U. Quito
17	MF	Deymar Borja	2 October 2009 (aged 17)	(Ecuadorian Football Federation) Guayas FC
18	MF	Jandry Calle	17 June 2009 (aged 17)	(Ecuadorian Football Federation) L.D.U. Quito
19	MF	Jose Rubio	13 February 2009 (aged 17)	(Ecuadorian Football Federation) L.D.U. Quito
20	FW	Luis Fragozo	8 April 2009 (aged 17)	(Ecuadorian Football Federation) Emelec
21	GK	Cristian Rodriguez	17 April 2009 (aged 17)	(Ecuadorian Football Federation) Universidad Católica

=== New Caledonia ===
No.	Pos.	Player	Date of birth (age)	Club
1	GK	Sylvain Ipeze	20 May 2009 (aged 17)	(New Caledonian Football Federation) AS Lössi
2	DF	Nino Lages	11 October 2010 (aged 16)	(New Caledonian Football Federation) AS Lössi
3	DF	Nestor Nykene	22 June 2009 (aged 17)	(New Caledonian Football Federation) ASG
4	DF	Stewy Andrew	18 January 2010 (aged 16)	(New Caledonian Football Federation) Tiga Sport
5	DF	Andre Menango	17 January 2009 (aged 17)	(New Caledonian Football Federation) AS Magenta
6	MF	Jakolexis Wanabo	8 January 2009 (aged 17)	(New Caledonian Football Federation) AS Lössi
7	FW	Lendy Wede	11 April 2009 (aged 17)	(New Caledonian Football Federation) Poindimié
8	MF	Ethan Dupuis	2 September 2009 (aged 17)	(New Caledonian Football Federation) AS Magenta
9	FW	Dany Maloko	9 October 2009 (aged 17)	(New Caledonian Football Federation) AS Lössi
10	MF	Hnola Wetemea	16 November 2009 (aged 17)	(New Caledonian Football Federation) AS Magenta
11	MF	Kylian Nekoeng	13 December 2009 (aged 16)	(French Football Federation) USSA Vertou
12	FW	Joel Anuana	12 March 2009 (aged 17)	(New Caledonian Football Federation) SC Bafia
13	MF	Lilian Une	8 March 2009 (aged 17)	(New Caledonian Football Federation) ASC Gaïca
14	MF	Pouen Wenessia	29 April 2009 (aged 17)	(New Caledonian Football Federation) ASC Gaïca
15	MF	Theophile Ione	16 June 2009 (aged 17)	(New Caledonian Football Federation) ASC Gaïca
16	GK	Ahron Watanabe	9 September 2009 (aged 17)	(New Caledonian Football Federation) Païta FC
17	FW	Leon Sciendi	4 January 2010 (aged 16)	(New Caledonian Football Federation) AS Lössi
18	MF	Matheo Desouches	14 December 2010 (aged 15)	(New Caledonian Football Federation) AS Lössi
19	DF	Maurice Palalou	26 February 2009 (aged 17)	(New Caledonian Football Federation) AS Lössi
20	MF	Pahaze Qaeze	20 June 2010 (aged 16)	(New Caledonian Football Federation) ASC Gaïca
21	GK	Paul Qaeze	18 February 2009 (aged 17)	(New Caledonian Football Federation) ASC Gaïca

=== Korea Republic ===
No.	Pos.	Player	Date of birth (age)	Club
1	GK	Junyeong Jang	27 August 2009 (aged 17)	(Korea Football Association) Pohang Steelers
2	DF	Jaehyuk Choi	4 November 2009 (aged 17)	(Korea Football Association) Gangwon FC
3	DF	Minu Seong	5 February 2009 (aged 17)	(Korea Football Association) Pohang Steelers
4	DF	Minjung Choi	15 April 2009 (aged 17)	(Korea Football Association) Pohang Steelers
5	DF	Munsu Kang	29 March 2009 (aged 17)	(Korea Football Association) Ulsan HD
6	MF	Hwan Hung	30 March 2009 (aged 17)	(Korea Football Association) FC Seoul
7	FW	Geon Baek	15 January 2009 (aged 17)	(Korea Football Association) Shinpyung High School
8	MF	Seungmin Han	9 November 2009 (aged 17)	(Korea Football Association) Jeonbuk Hyundai Motors FC
9	FW	Jiwon Kim	2 January 2009 (aged 17)	(Korea Football Association) Busan IPark
10	MF	Junhyun Kim	8 September 2009 (aged 17)	(Korea Football Association) Pohang Steelers
11	MF	Jiho Kim	18 April 2009 (aged 17)	(Korea Football Association) Daejeon Hana Citizen FC
12	GK	Kwanho Han	8 May 2009 (aged 17)	(Korea Football Association) FC Seoul
13	MF	Kanghun Park	8 March 2009 (aged 17)	(Korea Football Association) Suwon Samsung Bluewings
14	MF	Inwoo Lee	2 June 2009 (aged 17)	(Korea Football Association) Suwon Samsung Bluewings
15	MF	Jooho Park	21 July 2009 (aged 17)	(Korea Football Association) Busan IPark
16	DF	Doyoon Tae	1 January 2009 (aged 17)	(Korea Football Association) Ulsan HD
17	DF	Jeonghyeon Kim	15 April 2009 (aged 17)	(Korea Football Association) Suwon Samsung Bluewings
18	DF	Geonmin Choi	16 November 2009 (aged 17)	(Korea Football Association) Jeonbuk Hyundai Motors FC
19	MF	Jiseong Lim	9 February 2009 (aged 17)	(Korea Football Association) Jeonbuk Hyundai Motors FC
20	FW	Ian Nam	3 January 2009 (aged 17)	(Korea Football Association) Ulsan HD
21	GK	Gunho Kim	8 March 2009 (aged 17)	(Korea Football Association) Incheon United FC

=== Uganda ===
No.	Pos.	Player	Date of birth (age)	Club
1	GK	Hamidu Kasumba	22 December 2011 (aged 14)	(Federation of Uganda Football Associations) Vipers SC
2	DF	Ssa... Mwesigwa	5 December 2009 (aged 16)	(Federation of Uganda Football Associations) Volf Soccer Academy
3	DF	Eze Kombi	14 October 2011 (aged 15)	(Federation of Uganda Football Associations) Arsenal College FC
4	DF	Musa Suuna	9 June 2011 (aged 15)	(Federation of Uganda Football Associations) Amus College FC
5	MF	John Owino	5 June 2009 (aged 17)	(Federation of Uganda Football Associations) Vipers SC
6	MF	Henry Muhoozi	19 July 2011 (aged 15)	(Federation of Uganda Football Associations) Arsenal College FC
7	FW	Abdulshakur Babi	12 September 2009 (aged 17)	(Federation of Uganda Football Associations) Buddo SS
8	MF	Arnold Kayemba	27 August 2010 (aged 16)	(Federation of Uganda Football Associations) Masaka Sunshine FC
9	FW	Joseph Doron...	20 September 2010 (aged 16)	(Federation of Uganda Football Associations) Rays of Grace Academy
10	FW	Owen Mukisa	14 July 2011 (aged 15)	(Federation of Uganda Football Associations) Vipers SC
11	FW	Fahad Ismail	29 December 2010 (aged 15)	(Federation of Uganda Football Associations) KCCA FC
12	DF	Akulasha Jemba	17 February 2010 (aged 16)	(Federation of Uganda Football Associations) KCCA FC
13	DF	Trevor Mubiru	15 July 2011 (aged 15)	(Federation of Uganda Football Associations) Vipers SC
14	FW	Junior Ofowy...	7 March 2011 (aged 15)	(Federation of Uganda Football Associations) Masaka Sunshine FC
15	MF	Yusuf Ssenyonga	22 November 2011 (aged 14)	(Federation of Uganda Football Associations) Bukedea Comprehensive School
16	FW	Arafat Ibanda	3 December 2011 (aged 14)	(Federation of Uganda Football Associations) NEC FC
17	DF	Mujad Mbalire	5 August 2009 (aged 17)	(Federation of Uganda Football Associations) Masaka SS
18	GK	Adrian Mukwanga	25 May 2010 (aged 16)	(Federation of Uganda Football Associations) Vipers SC
19	GK	Ashraf Lukuyu...	25 December 2009 (aged 16)	(Federation of Uganda Football Associations) KCCA FC
20	MF	Isima Magala	28 July 2009 (aged 17)	(Federation of Uganda Football Associations) Masaka Sunshine FC
21	MF	Brian Olwa	21 December 2011 (aged 14)	(Federation of Uganda Football Associations) Edgars Youth Programme

== Group C ==
=== Argentina ===
Head coach: Diego Placente

=== Australia ===
The final squad was announced on 26 October 2026.

Head coach: Carl Veart

No.	Pos.	Player	Date of birth (age)	Caps	Goals	Club
1	GK	Charlie Wilson-Papps	13 September 2009 (aged 17)	8	0	(The Football Association) Brighton & Hove Albion
2	DF	Max Lyall-Rajendra	26 December 2009 (aged 16)	0	0	(The Football Association) Bournemouth
3	MF	Emmett Shaw	4 March 2009 (aged 17)	2	0	(Football Australia) Brisbane Roar
4	DF	Marcus Savic	21 March 2009 (aged 17)	16	1	(Football Australia) Western Sydney Wanderers
5	DF	Arnie Mitchell	6 May 2009 (aged 17)	4	0	(Football Australia) Brisbane Roar
6	MF	Besian Kutleshi	28 February 2009 (aged 17)	18	0	(Football Australia) Melbourne City
7	FW	Henrique Oliveira	17 January 2009 (aged 17)	11	3	(Football Australia) Macarthur FC
8	MF	Jariyah Shah	25 May 2009 (age 17)	4	1	(The Football Association) Manchester United
9	FW	Luke Becvinovski	4 May 2009 (aged 17)	15	10	(Football Australia) Central Coast Mariners
10	FW	Akol Akon	21 May 2009 (aged 17)	13	3	(Football Australia) Sydney FC
11	FW	Max Court	16 January 2009 (aged 17)	11	6	(Football Australia) APIA Leichhardt
12	GK	Lachlan Allen	4 April 2009 (aged 17)	8	0	(Football Australia) Western Sydney Wanderers
13	DF	Callum McCaskey	20 March 2009 (aged 17)	0	0	(Football Australia) Central Coast Mariners
14	MF	Oliver O'Carroll	16 May 2009 (aged 17)	10	2	(Football Australia) Central Coast Mariners
15	DF	Emile Katrib	17 July 2009 (aged 17)	12	1	(Football Australia) Western Sydney Wanderers
16	FW	Akeem Gerald	1 February 2010 (aged 16)	10	1	(Football Australia) Melbourne City
17	DF	Harrison Bond	19 January 2009 (aged 17)	3	0	(Austrian Football Association) Red Bull Salzburg
18	GK	Hugo Ng	3 January 2009 (aged 17)	3	0	(Football Australia) Adelaide United
19	MF	Dionn Nigro	19 August 2009 (aged 17)	2	0	(Football Australia) Sydney FC
20	FW	Georgio Hassarati	3 March 2009 (aged 17)	16	18	(Football Australia) Western Sydney Wanderers
21	MF	Sajjad Nasiri	3 February 2009 (aged 17)	12	0	(Football Australia) Adelaide United

=== Denmark ===
Head coach: Mads Lyng

=== Mozambique ===
Head coach: (Portugal) Luís Guerreiro

== Group D ==
=== France ===
Head coach: José Alcocer

No.	Pos.	Player	Date of birth (age)	Club
1	GK	Thao Mouapa	24 September 2009 (aged 17)	(French Football Federation) Stade Rennais
2	DF	Mathis Chambon	18 January 2009 (aged 17)	(French Football Federation) Montpellier HSC
3	DF	Firmin Thietot	23 May 2009 (aged 17)	(French Football Federation) Stade Rennais
4	DF	Noa Lango	2 January 2009 (aged 17)	(French Football Federation) Stade Brestois 29
5	DF	Mohamed Sylla	1 July 2009 (aged 17)	(French Football Federation) Paris FC
6	MF	Idrissa Dia	1 September 2009 (aged 17)	(French Football Federation) Stade Malherbe Caen
7	FW	Noah Tiehi	30 June 2009 (aged 17)	(French Football Federation) Paris Saint-Germain
8	DF	Shai N'Geng	16 June 2009 (aged 17)	(French Football Federation) FC Lorient
9	FW	Aly Traore	2 February 2009 (aged 17)	(French Football Federation) Amiens SC
10	FW	Noah Lourdounou	12 May 2009 (aged 17)	(French Football Federation) Stade Rennais
11	FW	Loan Merlefield	29 March 2009 (aged 17)	(French Football Federation) FC Nantes
12	DF	Evan Letrouit	17 March 2009 (aged 17)	(French Football Federation) En Avant Guingamp
13	FW	Seydou Konate	1 March 2009 (aged 17)	(French Football Federation) Paris Saint-Germain
14	FW	Djewing Liphonise	26 February 2009 (aged 17)	(French Football Federation) Valenciennes FC
15	DF	Leo Lemattre	26 May 2009 (aged 17)	(Royal Spanish Football Federation) Real Madrid CF
16	GK	Axel Decrinisse	25 January 2009 (aged 17)	(French Football Federation) AS Monaco FC
17	MF	Aymer Amaougch	30 September 2009 (aged 17)	(French Football Federation) Toulouse FC
18	DF	Louis Fouble	22 April 2009 (aged 17)	(French Football Federation) Valenciennes FC
19	DF	Mohamed Kamagate	10 February 2009 (aged 17)	(French Football Federation) Clermont Foot 63
20	FW	Mamadou Meite	1 July 2009 (aged 17)	(French Football Federation) Paris Saint-Germain
21	GK	Pierre Reale	1 July 2009 (aged 17)	(French Football Federation) AJ Auxerre

=== Haiti ===
Head coach: Kowsky Sainvil

No.	Pos.	Player	Date of birth (age)	Club
1	GK	Clifford Gene	6 September 2009 (aged 17)	(Jamaica Football Federation) Mount Pleasant FA
2	DF	Guvens Barjon	15 February 2010 (aged 16)	(Haitian Football Federation) JAF
3	DF	Leonardo Diejuste	30 October 2009 (aged 17)	(United States Soccer Federation) New York Red Bulls
4	DF	Stanley Louis	15 July 2009 (aged 17)	(Haitian Football Federation) Aigle Noir AC
5	MF	Miguel Joseph	14 September 2009 (aged 17)	(Haitian Football Federation) Exafoot FC
6	MF	Danick Dalce	5 January 2010 (aged 16)	(Haitian Football Federation) Exafoot FC
7	MF	Rolf Julien	15 August 2010 (aged 16)	(Haitian Football Federation) Exafoot FC
8	MF	Mickaely Chery	21 April 2010 (aged 16)	(Haitian Football Federation) LEG-AZ Academy
9	FW	Mamerly Elias	24 June 2010 (aged 16)	(Haitian Football Federation) Miragoâne FC
10	FW	Emerson Alisse	10 August 2009 (aged 17)	(Jamaica Football Federation) Mount Pleasant FA
11	FW	Lhandero Fils-Aimé	5 July 2010 (aged 16)	(Dominican Football Federation) Colégio Continental
12	GK	Stephane Gilles	11 March 2010 (aged 16)	Free agent
13	FW	Lucas Chevalier	24 February 2009 (aged 17)	(French Football Federation) Strasbourg
14	FW	Widlet Jean	15 July 2009 (aged 17)	(Haitian Football Federation) Real Hope FA
15	MF	Nohé Chevrié	21 April 2010 (aged 16)	(United States Soccer Federation) Miami FC
16	DF	Sonson Jean	24 June 2010 (aged 16)	(Haitian Football Federation) Aigle Noir AC
17	MF	Gerrisson Chery	31 August 2009 (aged 17)	(Haitian Football Federation) Tempête FC
18	DF	Jourdyn Clervilus	1 February 2009 (aged 17)	(Haitian Football Federation) Aigle Noir AC
19	FW	Stephen Ramos	3 April 2009 (aged 17)	(Argentine Football Association) Vélez Sarsfield
20	FW	Macenat Prophete	20 December 2009 (aged 16)	(Haitian Football Federation) LEG-AZ Academy
21	GK	Fred Josme	14 December 2009 (aged 16)	(Haitian Football Federation) Aigle Noir AC

=== Saudi Arabia ===
Head coach: Ahmed Alhanfoosh

No.	Pos.	Player	Date of birth (age)	Club
1	GK	Abdullah Alnakhli	29 September 2009 (aged 17)	(Saudi Arabian Football Federation) Al-Ittihad
2	DF	Naif Alqahtani	31 August 2009 (aged 17)	(Saudi Arabian Football Federation) Al-Hilal
3	DF	Ahmad Ishaq	1 October 2009 (aged 17)	(Saudi Arabian Football Federation) Al-Ittihad
4	DF	Nawaf Alhuwayri	6 January 2009 (aged 17)	(Saudi Arabian Football Federation) Al-Taawoun
5	DF	Jawad Alhashemsaleyed	2 February 2009 (aged 17)	(Saudi Arabian Football Federation) Al-Ettifaq
6	DF	Abdulrahman Almami	10 February 2010 (aged 16)	(Saudi Arabian Football Federation) Al-Qadsiah
7	FW	Yahya Ali	27 June 2009 (aged 17)	(Saudi Arabian Football Federation) Al-Nassr
8	MF	Sultan Binnahri	11 January 2009 (aged 17)	(Saudi Arabian Football Federation) Al-Ittihad
9	FW	Faris Bushara	28 July 2009 (aged 17)	(Saudi Arabian Football Federation) Al-Qadsiah
10	FW	Abdullah Alhamami	25 September 2009 (aged 17)	(Saudi Arabian Football Federation) Al-Ahli
11	MF	Saif Algharbi	22 October 2009 (aged 17)	(Saudi Arabian Football Federation) Al-Okhdood
12	DF	Marwan Almami	2 July 2009 (aged 17)	(Saudi Arabian Football Federation) Al-Ittihad
13	DF	Ammar Malani	27 June 2009 (aged 17)	(Saudi Arabian Football Federation) Al-Qadsiah
14	MF	Tameem Siraj	17 August 2009 (aged 17)	(Saudi Arabian Football Federation) Al-Ittihad
15	FW	Hamed Mohammed	31 December 2009 (aged 16)	(Saudi Arabian Football Federation) Al-Ittihad
16	GK	Musaad Alshammari	23 February 2009 (aged 17)	(Saudi Arabian Football Federation) Al Baha Saudi FC
17	MF	Shaman Alkahtani	25 February 2009 (aged 17)	(Saudi Arabian Football Federation) Al-Hilal
18	MF	Abdullah Albalti	29 October 2009 (aged 17)	(Saudi Arabian Football Federation) Al-Qadsiah
19	DF	Zaid Alburi	1 November 2009 (aged 17)	(Saudi Arabian Football Federation) Al-Hilal
20	MF	Hamad Alshammari	28 September 2009 (aged 17)	(Saudi Arabian Football Federation) Al-Qadsiah
21	GK	Abdullah Almas	18 February 2010 (aged 16)	(Saudi Arabian Football Federation) Al-Qadsiah

=== Uruguay ===
Head coach: Ignacio González

No.	Pos.	Player	Date of birth (age)	Club
1	GK	Luis Machín	6 February 2010 (aged 16)	(Uruguayan Football Association) Nacional
2	DF	Gabriel da Silva	13 January 2009 (aged 17)	(Uruguayan Football Association) Peñarol
3	DF	Lautaro Muñiz	26 March 2009 (aged 17)	(Uruguayan Football Association) Nacional
4	DF	Dahel Guedes	8 September 2009 (aged 17)	(Uruguayan Football Association) Peñarol
5	MF	Pablo Barreiro	7 January 2009 (aged 17)	(Uruguayan Football Association) Liverpool
6	DF	Felipe de León	20 April 2009 (aged 17)	(Uruguayan Football Association) Nacional
7	FW	Nicolás Scotti	26 November 2009 (aged 16)	(Uruguayan Football Association) Defensor Sporting
8	MF	Ramiro García	6 June 2009 (aged 17)	(Uruguayan Football Association) Nacional
9	FW	Juan Gancheff	20 April 2009 (aged 17)	(Uruguayan Football Association) Boston River
10	MF	Thiago Brizuela	26 February 2009 (aged 17)	(Uruguayan Football Association) Liverpool
11	FW	Alan Soares de Lima	16 January 2010 (aged 16)	(Uruguayan Football Association) Defensor Sporting
12	GK	Mateo Díaz	12 July 2009 (aged 17)	(Uruguayan Football Association) Peñarol
13	MF	Johann Fernández	13 February 2011 (aged 15)	(Uruguayan Football Association) Boston River
14	DF	Joel Farías	16 September 2010 (aged 16)	(Uruguayan Football Association) Nacional
15	MF	Bruno Bueno	3 January 2009 (aged 17)	(Uruguayan Football Association) Nacional
16	DF	Dante Rodella	5 March 2010 (aged 16)	(Uruguayan Football Association) Nacional
17	FW	Facundo Saldaña	4 April 2009 (aged 17)	(Uruguayan Football Association) Boston River
18	MF	Facundo Rodríguez	12 January 2010 (aged 16)	(Uruguayan Football Association) Montevideo City Torque
19	FW	Matteo Correia	9 January 2009 (aged 17)	(Uruguayan Football Association) Defensor Sporting
20	MF	Nicolás Rodríguez	24 March 2009 (aged 17)	(Royal Spanish Football Federation) Atlético Madrid
21	GK	Bautista Gavary	28 December 2009 (aged 16)	(Uruguayan Football Association) Paysandú

== Group E ==
=== Italy ===
The final squad was announced on 15 November 2026.

Head coach: Daniele Franceschini

No.	Pos.	Player	Date of birth (age)	Club
1	GK	Lorenzo Costoli	23 April 2009 (aged 17)	(Italian Football Federation) Genoa
2	DF	Giampaolo Bonifazi	23 February 2009 (aged 17)	(Italian Football Federation) Roma
3	DF	Matteo Albini	4 March 2009 (aged 17)	(Italian Football Federation) Como
4	DF	Djibril Diallo	9 March 2009 (aged 17)	(Italian Football Federation) Parma
5	DF	Ludovico Varali	17 January 2009 (aged 17)	(Italian Football Federation) Parma
6	DF	Andrea Donato	14 January 2009 (aged 17)	(Italian Football Federation) Inter Milan
7	FW	Jacopo Landi	26 February 2009 (aged 17)	(Italian Football Federation) Lazio
8	MF	Francesco Gasparello	2 January 2009 (aged 17)	(Italian Football Federation) Atalanta
9	FW	Diego Perillo	17 March 2009 (aged 17)	(Italian Football Federation) Atalanta
10	MF	Thomas Corigliano	20 January 2009 (aged 17)	(Italian Football Federation) Juventus
11	FW	Marcello Fugazzola	12 February 2009 (aged 17)	(Italian Football Federation) Atalanta
12	GK	Christian Lupo	29 May 2009 (aged 17)	(Italian Football Federation) Lecce
13	DF	Jacopo Del Fabro	29 January 2009 (aged 17)	(Italian Football Federation) Juventus
14	DF	Davide Rigo	2 April 2009 (aged 17)	(Italian Football Federation) Juventus
15	MF	Gianluca Okon	24 January 2009 (aged 17)	(Royal Belgian Football Association) Club Brugge
16	MF	Riccardo Cassano	18 March 2009 (aged 17)	(Italian Football Federation) Como
17	MF	Francesco Olivieri	22 April 2010 (aged 16)	(Italian Football Federation) Empoli
18	GK	Carlo Antonio Galliera	4 November 2009 (aged 17)	(Italian Football Federation) Inter Milan
19	FW	Tommaso Casagrande	19 January 2009 (aged 17)	(Italian Football Federation) Hellas Verona
20	MF	Gioele Giammattei	20 May 2009 (aged 17)	(Italian Football Federation) Roma
21	FW	Federico Croci	1 July 2010 (aged 16)	(Italian Football Federation) Fiorentina

=== Ivory Coast ===
Head coach: Bassiriki Diabaté

=== Jamaica ===
Head coach: Wendell Downswell

=== Uzbekistan ===
Head coach: Sergey Chigodaev

== Group F ==
=== Croatia ===
The final squad was announced on 27 October 2026.

Head coach: Marijan Budimir

No.	Pos.	Player	Date of birth (age)	Club
	GK	Lovro Lojen	27 July 2010 (aged 16)	(Croatian Football Federation) Gorica
	GK	Josip Pandurić	11 March 2009 (aged 17)	(Croatian Football Federation) Hajduk Split
	GK	Roko Banovac	1 May 2009 (aged 17)	(Croatian Football Federation) Istra 1961
	DF	Izak Ježić	23 March 2010 (aged 16)	(Croatian Football Federation) Osijek
	DF	Luka Posavec	15 April 2009 (aged 17)	(Croatian Football Federation) Osijek
	DF	Filip Pavić	19 January 2010 (aged 16)	(German Football Association) Bayern Munich
	DF	Ivan Paunović	20 July 2009 (aged 17)	(Croatian Football Federation) Dinamo Zagreb
	DF	Patrik Lacić	5 May 2009 (aged 17)	(German Football Association) 1860 Munich
	DF	Vito Sablić	22 May 2010 (aged 16)	(Croatian Football Federation) Lokomotiva
	DF	Karlo Zirdum	21 January 2009 (aged 17)	(Croatian Football Federation) Dinamo Zagreb
	MF	Marin Modrić	5 August 2009 (aged 17)	(Croatian Football Federation) Hajduk Split
	MF	Juraj Frigan	16 May 2009 (aged 17)	(Croatian Football Federation) Gorica
	MF	Endi Veljačić	30 January 2010 (aged 16)	(Croatian Football Federation) Istra 1961
	MF	Leon Šerifi	15 April 2009 (aged 17)	(Croatian Football Federation) Rijeka
	MF	Jona Benkotić	20 March 2009 (aged 17)	(Croatian Football Federation) Dinamo Zagreb
	MF	Mihael Kelava	29 May 2009 (aged 17)	(Croatian Football Federation) Gorica
	FW	Luka Bartolović	11 January 2010 (aged 16)	(Croatian Football Federation) Cibalia
	FW	Vid Seitz	27 November 2009 (aged 16)	(Croatian Football Federation) Rudeš
	FW	Nik Škafar Žužić	3 June 2009 (aged 17)	(Croatian Football Federation) Istra 1961
	FW	Jakov Dedić	27 August 2009 (aged 17)	(German Football Association) TSG Hoffenheim
	FW	Toni Ruso	4 January 2009 (aged 17)	(Croatian Football Federation) Hajduk Split

=== Cuba ===
Head coach: Sandro Sevillano

No.	Pos.	Player	Date of birth (age)	Club
1	GK	Yulo Godínez	12 October 2009 (aged 17)	(Football Association of Cuba) FC Ciudad de La Habana
2	DF	Elier Sidós	30 July 2009 (aged 17)	(Football Association of Cuba) FC Ciudad de La Habana
3	DF	Erick La O Carnet	14 July 2009 (aged 17)	(Football Association of Cuba) FC Guantánamo
4	DF	Erick Martín	13 February 2009 (aged 17)	(Football Association of Cuba) FC Villa Clara
5	FW	Frank Cabrado	26 February 2010 (aged 16)	(Football Association of Cuba) FC Santiago de Cuba
6	MF	Deiby Borrell	4 April 2009 (aged 17)	(Football Association of Cuba) FC Ciudad de La Habana
7	FW	Iván Pacheco	16 June 2009 (aged 17)	(Football Association of Cuba) FC Ciudad de La Habana
8	DF	Kevin Díaz	1 October 2009 (aged 17)	(Football Association of Cuba) FC Camagüey
9	FW	Yojanny Gonzalez	14 April 2009 (aged 17)	(Football Association of Cuba) FC Cienfuegos
10	FW	Yankarlos Iglesias	4 May 2009 (aged 17)	(Football Association of Cuba) FC Ciudad de La Habana
11	FW	Iker Rodriguez	28 January 2010 (aged 16)	(Football Association of Cuba) FC Ciudad de La Habana
12	GK	Kevin Méndez	12 June 2009 (aged 17)	(Football Association of Cuba) FC Diego de La Habana
13	FW	Jesús Bernabe	28 August 2009 (aged 17)	(Football Association of Cuba) FC Artemisa
14	MF	Dylan Leiva	17 January 2010 (aged 16)	(Football Association of Cuba) FC Ciudad de La Habana
15	MF	David Estrada	11 July 2011 (aged 15)	(Football Association of Cuba) FC Matanzas
16	MF	Alessandro Sevillano	3 September 2010 (aged 16)	(Football Association of Cuba) FC Artemisa
17	MF	Luis Naveada	26 April 2009 (aged 17)	(Football Association of Cuba) FC Pinar del Río
18	MF	Yan Garcia	3 January 2010 (aged 16)	(Football Association of Cuba) FC Ciudad de La Habana
19	FW	Cristian Rodríguez	31 January 2009 (aged 17)	(Football Association of Cuba) FC Pinar del Río
20	FW	Israel Entenza	15 March 2009 (aged 17)	(Football Association of Cuba) FC Ciudad de La Habana
21	GK	Claudio Daisson	11 February 2010 (aged 16)	(Football Association of Cuba) FC Guantánamo

=== Senegal ===
Head coach: Lamine Sané

No.	Pos.	Player	Date of birth (age)	Club
1	GK	Baba Camara	27 February 2009 (aged 17)	(Gambia Football Federation) Gambia Stars
2	DF	Lamine Mbengue	7 August 2009 (aged 17)	(Senegalese Football Federation) AS Génération Foot
3	DF	Bacary Sagna	3 August 2009 (aged 17)	(Senegalese Football Federation) ASC Espoirs de Guédiawaye
4	DF	Cheikh Thior	29 October 2010 (aged 16)	(Senegalese Football Federation) Oslo FA
5	MF	Elie Sadio	2 January 2010 (aged 16)	(Senegalese Football Federation) Essamaye FC
6	MF	Maurice Biaye	14 January 2009 (aged 17)	(Senegalese Football Federation) AFAT FC
7	FW	Sega Mbouli	27 November 2009 (aged 16)	(Senegalese Football Federation) AS Génération Foot
8	FW	Sidi Ndiaye	31 December 2009 (aged 16)	(Senegalese Football Federation) Diambars FC
9	FW	Ibrahim Dione	3 August 2009 (aged 17)	(Senegalese Football Federation) LHM
10	FW	Ibrahima Konte	23 September 2009 (aged 17)	(Gambia Football Federation) Gambia Stars
11	FW	Papa Gueye	12 August 2009 (aged 17)	(Senegalese Football Federation) ASC Les Jaraaf
12	MF	Mouhammed Faye	10 July 2009 (aged 17)	(Senegalese Football Federation) AS Génération Foot
13	MF	Mamour Cisse	27 September 2009 (aged 17)	(Senegalese Football Federation) ASC Les Jaraaf
14	DF	Cheikh Dieng	7 March 2009 (aged 17)	(Senegalese Football Federation) Diambars FC
15	GK	François Gomis	10 May 2009 (aged 17)	(Senegalese Football Federation) Niayes FC
16	GK	Assane Sarr	5 July 2010 (aged 16)	(Senegalese Football Federation) Ndiangane FC
17	DF	Malick Diallo	3 November 2009 (aged 17)	(Senegalese Football Federation) Dakar FC
18	MF	Moussa Cisse	20 April 2009 (aged 17)	(Senegalese Football Federation) AS Génération Foot
19	DF	Abdou Diallo	20 October 2009 (aged 17)	(Senegalese Football Federation) Diambars FC
20	FW	Jérôme Albis	27 January 2009 (aged 17)	(Senegalese Football Federation) ACHADAS
21	MF	El Sow	12 December 2009 (aged 16)	(Senegalese Football Federation) AS Dakar Sacré-Cœur

=== Tajikistan ===
Head coach: (Russia) Igor Surov

No.	Pos.	Player	Date of birth (age)	Club
1	GK	Muhammadrahim Rahmonov	3 January 2009 (aged 17)	(Tajikistan Football Federation) FC Hisobot
2	MF	Komiljon Sharipov	25 April 2011 (aged 15)	(Tajikistan Football Federation) FC Dushanbe-83
3	DF	Dilan Odinaev	20 May 2009 (aged 17)	(Russian Football Union) FC Sakhalin
4	DF	Sadriddin Sattorov	15 June 2009 (aged 17)	(Tajikistan Football Federation) FC Hulbuk
5	DF	Mustafo Hasanbekov	29 January 2009 (aged 17)	(Tajikistan Football Federation) FC Istiklol
6	DF	Hikmat Kabirov	3 July 2010 (aged 16)	(Tajikistan Football Federation) FC Dushanbe-83
7	FW	Asadbek Makhtumov	30 January 2010 (aged 16)	(Tajikistan Football Federation) FC Eskhata
8	MF	Muhammad Odilzoda	15 September 2010 (aged 16)	(Tajikistan Football Federation) FC Istiklol
9	MF	Muhammad Safarov	15 June 2009 (aged 17)	(Russian Football Union) FC Rostov
10	FW	Parviz Sanginov	5 February 2010 (aged 16)	(Tajikistan Football Federation) FC Khosilot
11	DF	Furuzan Rahimzoda	25 August 2010 (aged 16)	(Tajikistan Football Federation) FC Hisobot
12	GK	Ramazon Abdullozoda	16 September 2009 (aged 17)	(Tajikistan Football Federation) FC Dushanbe-83
13	DF	Ozodbek Tanjikholov	26 September 2010 (aged 16)	(Tajikistan Football Federation) Vakhsh Qurghonteppa
14	MF	Olimjon Olimov	28 May 2010 (aged 16)	(Tajikistan Football Federation) FC Dushanbe-83
15	MF	Murovar Anvarzod	31 October 2010 (aged 16)	(Tajikistan Football Federation) FC Dushanbe-83
16	GK	Abubakar Rahmonqulov	5 September 2009 (aged 17)	(Tajikistan Football Federation) FC Panjshanbe
17	MF	Parviz Bobonazarov	4 January 2010 (aged 16)	(Tajikistan Football Federation) FC Vakhsh
18	FW	Bakhshi Radzhabzoda	8 August 2010 (aged 16)	(Tajikistan Football Federation) FC Dushanbe-83
19	MF	Firdavsi Khalimov	25 December 2010 (aged 15)	(Tajikistan Football Federation) FC Dushanbe-83
20	MF	Azijon Shodiev	25 July 2010 (aged 16)	(Tajikistan Football Federation) FC Dushanbe-83
21	FW	Alijon Shuhratjonzoda	21 April 2010 (aged 16)	(Tajikistan Football Federation) FC Shahriston

== Group G ==
=== Belgium ===
Head coach: Sven Vermant

No.	Pos.	Player	Date of birth (age)	Club
1	GK	Mattis Seghers	19 January 2009 (aged 17)	(Royal Belgian Football Association) Anderlecht
2	DF	Tinus Moorthamer	6 October 2009 (aged 17)	(Royal Belgian Football Association) Genk
3	DF	Elie Mbavu	20 October 2009 (aged 17)	(Royal Belgian Football Association) Genk
4	DF	Preben Blondeel	7 January 2009 (aged 17)	(Royal Belgian Football Association) Gent
5	DF	Assil Saidi	10 June 2009 (aged 17)	(Royal Belgian Football Association) Genk
6	MF	Louie Van Gelder	30 January 2009 (aged 17)	(Royal Belgian Football Association) Antwerp
7	FW	Rayan Garcia Belkacem	29 September 2009 (aged 17)	(Royal Belgian Football Association) Gent
8	MF	Xander Dierckx	27 February 2009 (aged 17)	(Royal Belgian Football Association) Antwerp
9	FW	Ilyas Benktib	23 January 2009 (aged 17)	(Royal Belgian Football Association) Anderlecht
10	MF	Jelle Driessen	19 January 2009 (aged 17)	(Royal Belgian Football Association) Genk
11	FW	Kiyan Achahbar	30 January 2009 (aged 17)	(Royal Belgian Football Association) Genk
12	GK	Lowie Piselé	17 January 2009 (aged 17)	(Royal Belgian Football Association) Antwerp
13	FW	Al-Hassan Kamara	19 January 2009 (aged 17)	(Royal Belgian Football Association) Club Brugge
14	DF	Léni Strouwen	24 April 2009 (aged 17)	(Royal Belgian Football Association) Club Brugge
15	DF	Mamadou Nabyka Balde	19 June 2009 (aged 17)	(Royal Belgian Football Association) Club Brugge
16	FW	Niels Filippo	27 April 2009 (aged 17)	(Royal Belgian Football Association) Antwerp
17	FW	Anthony Philips	7 April 2009 (aged 17)	(Royal Belgian Football Association) KV Kortrijk
18	FW	Matteo Soria	5 February 2010 (aged 16)	(Royal Belgian Football Association) Club Brugge
19	MF	Djibril Gbemou	3 April 2009 (aged 17)	(Royal Belgian Football Association) Standard Liège
20	DF	Edgard Boahen Opoku	25 March 2009 (aged 17)	(Royal Belgian Football Association) Gent
21	GK	Esteban Levaux	29 December 2009 (aged 16)	(Royal Belgian Football Association) Standard Liège

=== Mali ===
Head coach: Soumaïla Coulibaly

No.	Pos.	Player	Date of birth (age)	Club
1	GK	Abdoul Coulibaly	12 October 2009 (aged 17)	(Malian Football Federation) FC Mali Cou...
2	DF	Mamadou Bah	21 August 2010 (aged 16)	(Malian Football Federation) Afrique Football Élite
3	MF	Lassina Coulibaly	18 March 2009 (aged 17)	(Malian Football Federation) Académie Junior Élite
4	DF	Cheick Coulibaly	25 January 2010 (aged 16)	(Malian Football Federation) Académie Football Cherif...
5	DF	Makan Sacko	29 June 2010 (aged 16)	(Malian Football Federation) Guidars FC
6	MF	Lassana Diawara	12 October 2009 (aged 17)	(Malian Football Federation) FC Mali Cou...
7	FW	Cheick Oumar Coulibaly	10 January 2009 (aged 17)	(Malian Football Federation) Winners Football Academy
8	MF	Mamadou Camara	3 September 2009 (aged 17)	(Malian Football Federation) Académie Étoiles du Monde
9	FW	Yaya N'Ganga	20 December 2009 (aged 16)	(Malian Football Federation) FC Mali Cou...
10	MF	Ismail Kamissoko	4 January 2010 (aged 16)	(Malian Football Federation) Académie Étoiles du Monde
11	FW	Aboubacar Keita	12 January 2010 (aged 16)	(Malian Football Federation) Derby Académie
12	DF	Youssouf Sylla	14 December 2009 (aged 16)	(Malian Football Federation) Afrique Football Élite
13	FW	Issa Kone	9 November 2009 (aged 17)	(Malian Football Federation) FC Mali Cou...
14	MF	Halidou Maiga	21 August 2010 (aged 16)	(Malian Football Federation) Afrique Football Élite
15	DF	Sidi Diarra	26 July 2010 (aged 16)	(Malian Football Federation) Académie Foot Élite
16	GK	Moulaye Coulibaly	9 July 2011 (aged 15)	(Malian Football Federation) Afrique Football Élite
17	FW	Sanaba Keita	1 May 2010 (aged 16)	(Malian Football Federation) Centre Sportif de Bamako
18	GK	Bocar Diarra	7 February 2009 (aged 17)	(Malian Football Federation) Olympique Saramako
19	FW	Alhousseni Maiga	2 September 2010 (aged 16)	(Malian Football Federation) FC Révolution Afrique
20	FW	Djigui Kotta	10 November 2010 (aged 16)	(Malian Football Federation) Guidars FC
21	DF	Moussa Dianessi	12 April 2010 (aged 16)	(Malian Football Federation) FC Chiffo

=== New Zealand ===
Head coach: Martin Bullock

No.	Pos.	Player	Date of birth (age)	Club
1	GK	Joseph Chalabi	7 March 2009 (aged 17)	(New Zealand Football) Wellington Phoenix FC
2	DF	Santiago Castillo	23 April 2010 (aged 16)	(New Zealand Football) Melbourne United AFC
3	MF	Grayson Cattle	28 January 2009 (aged 17)	(New Zealand Football) Wellington Phoenix FC
4	DF	Ethan Dyer	24 June 2009 (aged 17)	(Football Australia) Sydney FC
5	DF	Keigo Shimokawa	15 March 2010 (aged 16)	(Football Australia) Melbourne Victory FC
6	DF	Luke Carter	13 December 2010 (aged 15)	(New Zealand Football) Western Springs AFC
7	FW	Willem des Tombe	17 March 2009 (aged 17)	(New Zealand Football) Wellington Phoenix FC
8	MF	Callum Hamilton	17 May 2009 (aged 17)	(New Zealand Football) Wellington Phoenix FC
9	FW	Zach Cashmore	22 March 2010 (aged 16)	(New Zealand Football) Wellington Phoenix FC
10	FW	Matias Nunez	1 November 2009 (aged 17)	(New Zealand Football) Auckland United FC
11	MF	Ben Trenberth	8 June 2010 (aged 16)	(New Zealand Football) Wellington Phoenix FC
12	GK	Will Martin	28 January 2010 (aged 16)	(Football Australia) Central Coast Mariners FC
13	MF	Joe McIntyre	3 July 2009 (aged 17)	(New Zealand Football) Wellington Phoenix FC
14	FW	Jack Clegg	30 June 2010 (aged 16)	(New Zealand Football) Wellington Phoenix FC
15	MF	Sena Vesty	25 April 2009 (aged 17)	(New Zealand Football) Christchurch United FC
16	FW	James Wenceslao	9 April 2009 (aged 17)	(New Zealand Football) Auckland FC
17	FW	Cruz Pietersen	18 December 2010 (aged 15)	(New Zealand Football) Wellington Phoenix FC
18	DF	Sean Kane	15 July 2009 (aged 17)	(New Zealand Football) Auckland FC
19	MF	Gethyn Foster	3 June 2009 (aged 17)	(New Zealand Football) Wellington Phoenix FC
20	FW	John Woldegiorgis	29 November 2009 (aged 16)	(Football Australia) Western United FC
21	GK	Marc James	8 March 2011 (aged 15)	(Portuguese Football Federation) FC Alverca

=== Vietnam ===
The final squad was announced on 20 November 2026.

Head coach: (Brazil) Cristiano Roland

No.	Pos.	Player	Date of birth (age)	Club
1	GK	Chu Bá Huấn	26 January 2009 (age 17)	(Vietnam Football Federation) Hà Nội
2	DF	Nguyễn Khắc Minh Đức	10 July 2009 (age 17)	(Vietnam Football Federation) Hà Nội
3	DF	Nguyễn Mạnh Cường	25 February 2009 (age 17)	(Vietnam Football Federation) Thể Công-Viettel
4	DF	Nguyễn Huỳnh Đăng Khoa (captain)	18 February 2009 (age 17)	(Vietnam Football Federation) PVF
5	DF	Trần Hoàng Việt	22 February 2009 (age 17)	(Vietnam Football Federation) Hà Nội
6	MF	Đào Quý Vương	10 September 2009 (age 17)	(Vietnam Football Federation) Hà Nội
7	MF	Nguyễn Hiệp Đại Việt Nam	17 March 2009 (age 17)	(Vietnam Football Federation) Thép Xanh Nam Định
8	MF	Nguyễn Minh Thủy	12 February 2009 (age 17)	(Vietnam Football Federation) Sông Lam Nghệ An
9	FW	Lê Trọng Đại Nhân	8 October 2009 (age 17)	(Vietnam Football Federation) Thể Công-Viettel
10	MF	Chu Ngọc Nguyễn Lực	28 July 2009 (age 17)	(Vietnam Football Federation) Hà Nội
11	FW	Nguyễn Văn Dương	6 October 2009 (age 17)	(Vietnam Football Federation) PVF
12	GK	Nguyễn Việt Dũng	12 February 2009 (age 17)	(Vietnam Football Federation) PVF
13	DF	Nguyễn Ngọc Anh Hào	27 November 2009 (age 16)	(Vietnam Football Federation) PVF
14	DF	Quán Thành Công	16 June 2009 (age 17)	(Vietnam Football Federation) Sông Lam Nghệ An
15	MF	Nguyễn Trọng Phong	13 August 2009 (age 17)	(Vietnam Football Federation) PVF
16	FW	Trần Ngọc Sơn	2 January 2009 (age 17)	(Vietnam Football Federation) Sông Lam Nghệ An
17	MF	Trương Nguyễn Duy Khang	30 March 2009 (age 17)	(Vietnam Football Federation) PVF
18	FW	Trần Trí Dũng	24 March 2009 (age 17)	(Vietnam Football Federation) Thể Công-Viettel
19	FW	Trần Mạnh Quân	28 June 2010 (age 16)	(Vietnam Football Federation) Hà Nội
20	FW	Lê Sỹ Bách	4 January 2009 (age 17)	(Vietnam Football Federation) PVF
21	GK	Lý Xuân Hòa	21 July 2009 (age 17)	(Vietnam Football Federation) PVF

== Group H ==
=== China ===
A 25-player preliminary squad was announced on 28 October 2026.

Head coach: (Japan) Bin Ukishima

No.	Pos.	Player	Date of birth (age)	Club
1	GK	Jiang Chengen	2 May 2010 (aged 16)	(Chinese Football Association) Hubei Istar
2	DF	Zhang Xuyao	22 March 2009 (aged 17)	(Chinese Football Association) Shandong Taishan
3	DF	Jin Yucheng	15 June 2009 (aged 17)	(Croatian Football Federation) Lokomotiva Zagreb
4	DF	Nan Zixun	23 March 2009 (aged 17)	(Chinese Football Association) Tsinghua University High School
5	DF	Li Junpeng	19 February 2009 (aged 17)	(Chinese Football Association) Shandong Taishan
6	MF	Zhou Yunuo	26 February 2009 (aged 17)	(Chinese Football Association) Tsinghua University High School
7	MF	Kuang Zhaolei	13 March 2009 (aged 17)	(Chinese Football Association) Qingdao Hainiu
8	MF	Xu Zhengpeng	15 March 2009 (aged 17)	(Chinese Football Association) Wuhan Three Towns
9	FW	Zhao Songyuan	7 April 2009 (aged 17)	(Chinese Football Association) Tsinghua University High School
10	MF	Wan Xiang	21 April 2009 (aged 17)	(Football Association of Serbia) Red Star Belgrade
11	MF	He Sifan	14 January 2009 (aged 17)	(Chinese Football Association) Wuhan Three Towns
12	GK	Qin Ziniu	10 July 2009 (aged 17)	(Chinese Football Association) Evergrande Football School
13	MF	Pan Chaowei	25 February 2010 (aged 16)	(Chinese Football Association) Shandong Taishan
14	FW	Liang Shiyu	6 May 2009 (aged 17)	(Chinese Football Association) Wuhan Three Towns
15	FW	Jin Guancheng	13 July 2009 (aged 17)	(Korea Football Association) Ulsan HD
16	MF	Jin Junhu	18 February 2010 (aged 16)	(Korea Football Association) Suwon Samsung Bluewings
17	MF	Li Jiarun	5 September 2009 (aged 17)	(Chinese Football Association) Meizhou Hakka
18	DF	Liu Zhicheng	28 March 2009 (aged 17)	(Chinese Football Association) Qingdao West Coast
19	DF	Zhang Junhao	3 January 2009 (aged 17)	(Chinese Football Association) Shandong Taishan
20	FW	Shuai Weihao	5 January 2009 (aged 17)	(Chinese Football Association) Chengdu Rongcheng
21	GK	Jiang Yuhan	1 January 2010 (aged 16)	(Chinese Football Association) Qingdao Hainiu

=== Fiji ===
Head coach: Sunil Kumar

No.	Pos.	Player	Date of birth (age)	Club
1	GK	Kameli Keresoni	1 July 2009 (aged 17)	Free agent
2	DF	Salesi Vatanikawake	10 July 2009 (aged 17)	Free agent
3	MF	Kavan Gounder	17 August 2009 (aged 17)	Free agent
4	MF	Amanav Chand	13 May 2009 (aged 17)	(Football Australia) Blacktown Spartans FC
5	MF	Jone Loga	20 April 2010 (aged 16)	(Fiji Football Association) Ba FC
6	MF	Maikah Dau	29 April 2009 (aged 17)	(Fiji Football Association) Nasinu FC
7	MF	Mustafez Khan	26 March 2009 (aged 17)	(New Zealand Football) Auckland City FC
8	FW	Rayaan Bin	10 October 2010 (aged 16)	(Fiji Football Association) Nadi FC
9	FW	Taito Bai	14 July 2009 (aged 17)	(Fiji Football Association) Navua FC
10	MF	Ryan Achari	25 January 2009 (aged 17)	(New Zealand Football) Hamilton Wanderers AFC
11	FW	Nivan Reddy	26 February 2009 (aged 17)	Free agent
12	DF	Somit Maharaj	20 January 2010 (aged 16)	(New Zealand Football) Auckland Football
13	FW	Ryan Swami	25 March 2010 (aged 16)	(Fiji Football Association) Ba FC
14	FW	Isa Baselala	5 September 2010 (aged 16)	(Fiji Football Association) Rewa FC
15	FW	Isa Muatini	8 May 2009 (aged 17)	Free agent
16	MF	Akuila Vata	9 August 2009 (aged 17)	(Fiji Football Association) Ba FC
17	DF	Ayush Naidu	20 June 2009 (aged 17)	(New Zealand Football) Auckland United FC
18	DF	Jack Ravnaya	17 March 2009 (aged 17)	Free agent
19	MF	Adian Ali	31 January 2009 (aged 17)	(Football Australia) Nepean FC
20	GK	Kinkiti Biu	8 January 2011 (aged 15)	(Fiji Football Association) Ba FC
21	GK	Ratu Natirivi	11 July 2010 (aged 16)	Free agent

=== Morocco ===
The final squad was announced on 3 November 2026.

Head coach: Ahmed Kantari

No.	Pos.	Player	Date of birth (age)	Club
1	GK	Adam Mouak	1 June 2009 (aged 17)	(French Football Federation) Paris Saint-Germain
2	DF	Mehdi Moustapha Lahmadi	27 February 2009 (aged 17)	(French Football Federation) FC Metz
3	DF	Wael Jassim Jolissaint	17 December 2009 (aged 16)	(Swiss Football Association) Neuchâtel Xamax
4	DF	Adam Soudi	18 March 2009 (aged 17)	(French Football Federation) Toulouse FC
5	DF	Mohamed Habib Zinbi	17 November 2009 (aged 17)	(Royal Spanish Football Federation) Atlético de Madrid
6	MF	Imran Talai	3 February 2009 (aged 17)	(Royal Dutch Football Association) Ajax
7	FW	Ismail El Aoud	28 July 2009 (aged 17)	(Royal Spanish Football Federation) Valencia CF
8	MF	Nassim Laarej	22 March 2009 (aged 17)	(French Football Federation) OGC Nice
9	FW	Ziyad Baha	10 August 2009 (aged 17)	(French Football Federation) Olympique de Marseille
10	MF	Ilian Hadidi	6 March 2009 (aged 17)	(Royal Dutch Football Association) Feyenoord
11	FW	Rami Lougmani	25 May 2009 (aged 17)	(Royal Belgian Football Association) Anderlecht
12	GK	Mohamed Harouch	18 May 2009 (aged 17)	(Royal Moroccan Football Federation) Mohammed VI Football Academy
13	MF	Bilal Affas	7 July 2009 (aged 17)	(Royal Moroccan Football Federation) RS Berkane
14	DF	Adam Bouahdadi	22 June 2009 (aged 17)	(Royal Moroccan Football Federation) Mohammed VI Football Academy
15	DF	Ali Saif Eddine Machfouk	18 July 2009 (aged 17)	(Royal Moroccan Football Federation) Mohammed VI Football Academy
16	GK	Rayan Yaakoubi	29 April 2009 (aged 17)	(Royal Belgian Football Association) Gent
17	FW	Ibrahim Rabbaj	3 January 2009 (aged 17)	(The Football Association) Chelsea
18	DF	Ayman Ezzarky	25 August 2009 (aged 17)	(Royal Moroccan Football Federation) Mohammed VI Football Academy
19	FW	Mohamed-Amine Obakrim	21 October 2009 (aged 17)	(Royal Moroccan Football Federation) RS Berkane
20	MF	Wahib El Antary	6 March 2009 (aged 17)	(French Football Federation) Angers SCO
21	FW	Anass El Khazri	12 January 2009 (aged 17)	(Royal Moroccan Football Federation) Mohammed VI Football Academy

=== Spain ===
Head coach: David Cubillo

No.	Pos.	Player	Date of birth (age)	Club
1	GK	Guille Ponce	10 March 2009 (aged 17)	(Royal Spanish Football Federation) Real Madrid
2	DF	Raúl Expósito	26 April 2009 (aged 17)	(Royal Spanish Football Federation) Barcelona
3	DF	Jordi Pesquer	26 January 2009 (aged 17)	(Royal Spanish Football Federation) Barcelona
4	MF	Junior Zamorano	8 August 2009 (aged 17)	(Royal Spanish Football Federation) Girona
5	DF	Sergi Mayans	30 January 2009 (aged 17)	(Royal Spanish Football Federation) Barcelona
6	MF	Eloi Gómez	8 April 2009 (aged 17)	(Royal Dutch Football Association) Ajax
7	FW	Owen Mira	18 April 2009 (aged 17)	(Royal Spanish Football Federation) Granada
8	MF	Marco Company	24 January 2009 (aged 17)	(Royal Spanish Football Federation) Real Madrid
9	FW	Guillermo Trujillano	18 April 2009 (aged 17)	(Royal Spanish Football Federation) Atlético de Madrid
10	FW	Ebrima Tunkara	10 March 2010 (aged 16)	(Royal Spanish Football Federation) Barcelona
11	FW	Christian Imga	17 February 2009 (aged 17)	(Royal Spanish Football Federation) Athletic Club
12	DF	Arnau Cases	17 May 2009 (aged 17)	(Royal Spanish Football Federation) RCD Espanyol
13	GK	Darlington Osuchukwu	18 November 2009 (aged 17)	(Royal Spanish Football Federation) Athletic Club
14	DF	Baba Kourouma	23 February 2009 (aged 17)	(Royal Spanish Football Federation) Barcelona
15	DF	Jorge Domínguez	21 December 2009 (aged 16)	(Royal Spanish Football Federation) Atlético de Madrid
16	MF	Mateo Sobral	13 January 2009 (aged 17)	(Royal Spanish Football Federation) Celta Vigo
17	FW	Iu Martínez	27 April 2009 (aged 17)	(Royal Spanish Football Federation) Barcelona
18	FW	Yeremiah Ramos	2 March 2009 (aged 17)	(Royal Spanish Football Federation) Real Madrid
19	FW	Roberto Tomás	20 February 2009 (aged 17)	(Royal Spanish Football Federation) Barcelona
20	FW	Rafael Cruz	24 October 2009 (aged 17)	(Royal Spanish Football Federation) Las Palmas
21	GK	Diego Piqueras	3 September 2009 (aged 17)	(Royal Spanish Football Federation) Atlético de Madrid

== Group I ==
=== Brazil ===
The final squad was announced on 22 October 2026. On 19 November 2026, Andrey Oliveira withdrew from the squad due to an injury and was replaced by Gustavo Afonso.

Head coach: Carlos Eduardo Patetuci

No.	Pos.	Player	Date of birth (age)	Club
1	GK	Werneck	14 February 2009 (aged 17)	(Brazilian Football Confederation) Flamengo
2	DF	Marcos Pesseti	14 August 2009 (aged 17)	(Brazilian Football Confederation) Athletico Paranaense
3	DF	Daniel Silva	31 March 2009 (aged 17)	(Brazilian Football Confederation) Flamengo
4	DF	Breno Sales	6 November 2009 (aged 17)	(Brazilian Football Confederation) Vasco da Gama
5	MF	Leonardo Cerci	5 May 2009 (aged 17)	(Brazilian Football Confederation) Athletico Paranaense
6	DF	Richard Wendel	25 March 2009 (aged 17)	(Brazilian Football Confederation) Fluminense
7	FW	Kauê Furquim	27 February 2009 (aged 17)	(Brazilian Football Confederation) Bahia
8	MF	Eduardo Pape	20 March 2009 (aged 17)	(Brazilian Football Confederation) Cruzeiro
9	FW	Rodrigo Junior	23 April 2010 (aged 16)	(Brazilian Football Confederation) Vasco da Gama
10	MF	Lucca Caramico	7 February 2009 (aged 17)	(Brazilian Football Confederation) Corinthians
11	MF	Dudú	7 December 2009 (aged 16)	(Brazilian Football Confederation) Palmeiras
12	GK	Arthur Vale	28 January 2009 (aged 17)	(Brazilian Football Confederation) Santos
13	DF	David Brendo	15 January 2009 (aged 17)	(Brazilian Football Confederation) Grêmio
14	DF	Iago	17 February 2010 (aged 16)	(Brazilian Football Confederation) Corinthians
15	MF	Gustavo Afonso	4 April 2009 (aged 17)	(Brazilian Football Confederation) Athletico Paranaense
16	DF	Samuel	16 January 2009 (aged 17)	(Brazilian Football Confederation) Atlético Mineiro
17	FW	João França	10 November 2009 (aged 17)	(Brazilian Football Confederation) Palmeiras
18	FW	Riquelme	17 January 2009 (aged 17)	(Brazilian Football Confederation) Atlético Mineiro
19	FW	Lucas Emanuel	6 March 2009 (aged 17)	(Brazilian Football Confederation) Botafogo
20	FW	João Couto	2 March 2009 (aged 17)	(Brazilian Football Confederation) Flamengo
21	GK	Arthur Sehn	15 May 2009 (aged 17)	(Brazilian Football Confederation) Athletico Paranaense

=== Costa Rica ===
Head coach: Randall Azofeifa

=== Republic of Ireland ===
The final squad was announced on 9 November 2026.

Head coach: John Cotter

No.	Pos.	Player	Date of birth (age)	Club
1	GK	Darragh Brunton	1 June 2009 (aged 17)	(Football Association of Ireland) St Patrick's Athletic
2	DF	Maxim Afonin	6 February 2010 (aged 16)	(Football Association of Ireland) Shamrock Rovers
3	DF	Danny Burke	19 January 2009 (aged 17)	(Football Association of Ireland) Shamrock Rovers
4	DF	Sean Spaight	25 January 2009 (aged 17)	(Football Association of Ireland) Dundalk
5	DF	Kian Quigley (captain)	28 February 2009 (aged 17)	(Football Association of Ireland) St Patrick's Athletic
6	MF	Tom McGrath	7 March 2009 (aged 17)	(Football Association of Ireland) Cork City
7	MF	Cillian Murphy	22 July 2009 (aged 17)	(Football Association of Ireland) Cork City
8	MF	Josh O'Dwyer	17 March 2010 (aged 16)	(Austrian Football Association) Liefering
9	FW	Desmond Armstrong	27 November 2009 (aged 16)	(French Football Federation) Lorient
10	MF	Ryan Sheridan	31 March 2009 (aged 17)	(Football Association of Ireland) St Patrick's Athletic
11	FW	Joe Carroll-Byrne	2 August 2009 (aged 17)	(Football Association of Ireland) St Patrick's Athletic
12	FW	Corey Fay	18 October 2010 (aged 16)	(Football Association of Ireland) Shamrock Rovers
13	DF	Jayden Marshall	31 January 2010 (aged 16)	(Italian Football Federation) Como
14	FW	Hugh Martin	1 January 2010 (aged 16)	(Football Association of Ireland) Bohemians
15	MF	Richard Ferizaj	13 February 2009 (aged 17)	(Football Association of Ireland) Bray Wanderers
16	GK	George Moloney	17 November 2009 (aged 17)	(The Football Association) Southampton
17	FW	Joey Wuna	19 August 2009 (aged 17)	(Football Association of Ireland) Shelbourne
18	FW	Ronan Keating	9 March 2011 (aged 15)	(Football Association of Ireland) Galway United
19	DF	Josh O'Connor	9 June 2009 (aged 17)	(Football Association of Ireland) St Patrick's Athletic
20	MF	Jayden Goad	18 May 2009 (aged 17)	(Football Association of Ireland) UCD
21	GK	Xander Grieves	13 April 2009 (aged 17)	(The Football Association) Southampton

=== Tanzania ===
Head coach: Elieneza Nsanganzelu

== Group J ==
=== Algeria ===
Head coach: Amine Ghimouz

=== Chile ===
The final squad was announced on 5 November 2026.

Head coach: Ariel Leporati

No.	Pos.	Player	Date of birth (age)	Club
1	GK	Vicente Villegas	23 August 2009 (aged 17)	(Football Federation of Chile) Coquimbo Unido
2	DF	Esteban Páez	2 April 2009 (aged 17)	(Football Federation of Chile) Universidad de Concepción
3	DF	Benjamín Villarroel	5 February 2009 (aged 17)	(Football Federation of Chile) Cobresal
4	DF	Baltazar Oróstica	30 September 2010 (aged 16)	(Football Federation of Chile) O'Higgins
5	DF	Lucas López	3 April 2009 (aged 17)	(Football Federation of Chile) Curicó Unido
6	MF	Sebastián Melgarejo	1 April 2009 (aged 17)	(Football Federation of Chile) Huachipato
7	FW	Jonathan Guerrero	9 April 2009 (aged 17)	(Argentine Football Association) Independiente
8	MF	Joaquín Muñoz (captain)	6 June 2009 (aged 17)	(Football Federation of Chile) O'Higgins
9	FW	Amaro Pérez	3 September 2009 (aged 17)	(Football Federation of Chile) Universidad Católica
10	FW	Bayron Barrera	5 January 2009 (aged 17)	(Football Federation of Chile) Deportes Iquique
11	FW	Bayron Lizama	23 February 2009 (aged 17)	(Football Federation of Chile) Universidad Católica
12	GK	Cristóbal del Río	9 February 2010 (aged 16)	(Football Federation of Chile) Universidad Católica
13	MF	Claudio Salvo	28 May 2009 (aged 17)	(Football Federation of Chile) Colo-Colo
14	MF	Nicolás Marinetti	11 August 2009 (aged 17)	(Football Federation of Chile) Universidad de Chile
15	MF	Rodrigo Catalán	14 April 2009 (aged 17)	(Football Federation of Chile) Colo-Colo
16	DF	Martín Barrios	14 September 2009 (aged 17)	(Football Federation of Chile) Universidad Católica
17	DF	Antonio Cannoni	2 October 2009 (aged 17)	(Italian Football Federation) Modena
18	FW	Amaro Riveros	21 December 2010 (aged 15)	(Football Federation of Chile) Universidad Católica
19	MF	Andher González	24 October 2009 (aged 17)	(Football Federation of Chile) Universidad de Chile
20	FW	Felipe Raipán	26 April 2010 (aged 16)	(Football Federation of Chile) Colo-Colo
21	GK	Máximo Hernández	18 November 2009 (aged 17)	(Football Federation of Chile) Deportes La Serena

=== Dominican Republic ===
Dominican Republic replaced the United States on 12 November 2026.

Head coach: Edward Acevedo

=== Montenegro ===
Head coach: Radovan Kavaja

=== United States ===
The final squad was announced on 6 November 2026. On 12 November 2026, the United States withdrew from the competition due to security concerns in the Middle East.

Head coach: Alex Aldaz

No.	Pos.	Player	Date of birth (age)	Club
	GK	James Donaldson	20 March 2009 (aged 17)	(United States Soccer Federation) Atlanta United 2
	GK	Philipp Eckle	9 March 2009 (aged 17)	(German Football Association) Augsburg
	GK	Toby Szewczyk	26 January 2009 (aged 17)	(United States Soccer Federation) New York Red Bulls Academy
	DF	Miles Aalbersberg	14 March 2010 (aged 16)	(Royal Dutch Football Association) Ajax Youth Academy
	DF	Eddie Chadwick	7 August 2009 (aged 17)	(The Football Association) Queens Park Rangers
	DF	Gianmarco Di Noto	27 March 2009 (aged 17)	(United States Soccer Federation) Columbus Crew 2
	DF	Prince Forfor	14 March 2009 (aged 17)	(United States Soccer Federation) Columbus Crew 2
	DF	Astin Mbaye	5 March 2009 (aged 17)	(Italian Football Federation) AC Milan Academy
	DF	Joshua Wilbrenninck-van Cuilenborg	8 January 2009 (aged 17)	(Royal Dutch Football Association) Feyenoord Academy
	MF	Deven Cadigan	15 March 2009 (aged 17)	(United States Soccer Federation) New York Red Bulls Academy
	MF	Vinny Garcia	25 July 2010 (aged 16)	(United States Soccer Federation) LA Galaxy Academy
	MF	Peter Molinari	28 January 2009 (aged 17)	(United States Soccer Federation) New York City FC II
	MF	Judah Siqueira	27 March 2009 (aged 17)	(United States Soccer Federation) New England Revolution II
	MF	Kaedren Spivey	28 May 2009 (aged 17)	(United States Soccer Federation) San Jose Earthquakes II
	MF	Ignacio Suarez-Couri	3 April 2009 (aged 17)	(United States Soccer Federation) Atlanta United 2
	FW	Kashan Hines	3 January 2009 (aged 17)	(United States Soccer Federation) Sporting Kansas City II
	FW	Malik Jakupovic	24 June 2009 (aged 17)	(United States Soccer Federation) Philadelphia Union
	FW	Will Ostrander	7 April 2009 (aged 17)	(Royal Dutch Football Association) PSV Eindhoven Academy
	FW	Robert Turdean	4 January 2010 (aged 16)	(United States Soccer Federation) Chicago Fire Academy
	FW	Makai Wells	2 January 2009 (aged 17)	(United States Soccer Federation) New England Revolution II
	FW	Edward Wumah	7 January 2009 (aged 17)	(Royal Spanish Football Federation) Girona Academy

== Group K ==
=== Cameroon ===
The final squad was announced on 11 November 2026.

Head coach: Thomas Libiih

No.	Pos.	Player	Date of birth (age)	Club
1	GK	Glory Kingue	24 February 2010 (aged 16)	(Cameroonian Football Federation) Player FC Yaoundé
2	DF	Mark Mbonga	21 May 2010 (aged 16)	(Cameroonian Football Federation) AS Nylon
3	FW	Yann Ndzie	4 May 2010 (aged 16)	(Cameroonian Football Federation) Espérance Guider
4	DF	Ulrick Kenfack	13 March 2009 (aged 17)	(Royal Belgian Football Association) Standard Liège
5	DF	Lilian Djeudje	28 July 2009 (aged 17)	(French Football Federation) Nantes
6	MF	Abdoulraman Soudeisse	16 June 2009 (aged 17)	(Cameroonian Football Federation) AS Dauphine FC
7	FW	Douka Nkoto	27 September 2010 (aged 16)	(The Football Association) Manchester United
8	MF	Bassirou Nkoto	27 September 2010 (aged 16)	(The Football Association) Manchester United
9	MF	Emmanuel Eone	16 January 2009 (aged 17)	(Italian Football Federation) Lazio
10	FW	Ivan Massek	8 June 2009 (aged 17)	(German Football Association) Bayer Leverkusen
11	FW	Aviel Fortune Hentcho Nseke	14 November 2009 (aged 17)	(German Football Association) Bayern Munich
12	MF	Willy Oumbe	12 January 2010 (aged 16)	(Cameroonian Football Federation) Young Talent Academy
13	FW	Michel Mba	5 January 2010 (aged 16)	(Cameroonian Football Federation) A.P.E.J.E.S de Mfou
14	DF	Esingila Georges	17 June 2009 (aged 17)	(Cameroonian Football Federation) Best Stars Academy
15	DF	Eric Bolo	30 June 2009 (aged 17)	(Cameroonian Football Federation) Mintack FC
16	GK	Ange Tchana	14 December 2009 (aged 16)	(Cameroonian Football Federation) Africa Football FC
17	MF	William Guecke	3 November 2010 (aged 16)	(The Football Association) Manchester City
18	MF	Karel Krys	16 September 2009 (aged 17)	(Cameroonian Football Federation) Indomables Academie Cameroon
19	MF	Pierre Assoumou	20 July 2010 (aged 16)	(Cameroonian Football Federation) A.P.E.J.E.S de Mfou
20	MF	Joel Anong	22 January 2009 (aged 17)	(Royal Spanish Football Federation) Trival Valderas
21	GK	Chelsea Festus	5 January 2010 (aged 16)	(Royal Belgian Football Association) Sporting Charleroi

=== Mexico ===
The squad was called up on 4 November 2026.

Head coach: Jürgen Castañeda

No.	Pos.	Player	Date of birth (age)	Club
1	GK	José Corona	8 May 2010 (aged 16)	(Mexican Football Federation) Tijuana
2	DF	Alan Hernández	5 August 2009 (aged 17)	(Mexican Football Federation) León
3	DF	Dylan Martínez	18 March 2009 (aged 17)	(Mexican Football Federation) Necaxa
4	DF	André Godinez	20 January 2009 (aged 17)	(Mexican Football Federation) Guadalajara
5	DF	Adonai Valdez	14 February 2009 (aged 17)	(Mexican Football Federation) América
6	MF	Jonathan de la Fuente	13 June 2009 (aged 17)	(United States Soccer Federation) Colorado Rapids
7	MF	Juan Carlos Martínez	12 March 2010 (aged 16)	(Mexican Football Federation) Querétaro
8	FW	Fernando Ruiz	14 April 2010 (aged 16)	(Mexican Football Federation) Toluca
9	FW	Adán Sánchez	25 May 2009 (aged 17)	(Mexican Football Federation) Monterrey
10	MF	Edy Lugo	2 July 2009 (aged 17)	(Mexican Football Federation) Monterrey
11	MF	Santiago Cisneros	11 August 2009 (aged 17)	(Mexican Football Federation) León
12	GK	Marcelo Ávalos	8 November 2009 (aged 17)	(United States Soccer Federation) San Jose Earthquakes
13	MF	Matthew Arana	28 August 2010 (aged 16)	(United States Soccer Federation) Houston Dynamo
14	FW	Da'vian Kimbrough	18 February 2010 (aged 16)	(United States Soccer Federation) North Texas SC
15	DF	Miguel Rivera	2 September 2009 (aged 17)	(Mexican Football Federation) América
16	MF	Saulo Tejeda	1 May 2009 (aged 17)	(Croatian Football Federation) Dinamo Zagreb Academy
17	DF	Gerson Gutiérrez	8 May 2009 (aged 17)	(Mexican Football Federation) Guadalajara
18	MF	Ángel Reyes	5 March 2009 (aged 17)	(Mexican Football Federation) Atlético San Luis
19	MF	David Orduño	19 January 2009 (aged 17)	(Mexican Football Federation) Tijuana
20	DF	Álvaro Velázquez	20 March 2009 (aged 17)	(Mexican Football Federation) Monterrey
21	GK	Johan Cuenca	3 July 2009 (aged 17)	(Mexican Football Federation) UANL

=== Romania ===
Head coach: Mircea Diaconescu

=== Venezuela ===
Head coach: Fernando Aristeguieta

== Group L ==
=== Colombia ===
The final squad was announced on 11 November 2026. On 16 November 2026, Gorka Abascal withdrew from the squad due to an injury and was replaced by Juan José Palacio.

Head coach: Fredy Hurtado

No.	Pos.	Player	Date of birth (age)	Club
1	GK	Luigi Ortiz	10 February 2009 (aged 17)	(Colombian Football Federation) Deportivo Cali
2	DF	Jhan Moreno	20 July 2009 (aged 17)	(Colombian Football Federation) Atlético Nacional
3	DF	Santiago Vallecilla	17 March 2009 (aged 17)	(Colombian Football Federation) Deportivo Cali
4	DF	Edwin Estrella	20 February 2009 (aged 17)	(Colombian Football Federation) Arco Zaragoza
5	MF	Simón Rojas	14 April 2009 (aged 17)	(Colombian Football Federation) Atlético Nacional
6	MF	Eider Carrillo	12 January 2009 (aged 17)	(Colombian Football Federation) Independiente Medellín
7	FW	Matías Caicedo	25 December 2009 (aged 16)	(Colombian Football Federation) Independiente Valle del Cauca
8	MF	Juan José Palacio	24 September 2009 (aged 17)	(Colombian Football Federation) Envigado
9	FW	Adrían Mosquera	9 April 2009 (aged 17)	(Colombian Football Federation) Independiente Medellín
10	MF	Samuel Martínez	5 April 2009 (aged 17)	(Colombian Football Federation) Atlético Nacional
11	FW	Edwin Echeverría	5 March 2009 (aged 17)	(Colombian Football Federation) Atlético Nacional
12	GK	Samuel Martínez Correa	2 January 2009 (aged 17)	(Colombian Football Federation) Envigado
13	DF	Anderson Murillo	15 April 2009 (aged 17)	(Colombian Football Federation) Independiente Medellín
14	MF	Jacky Muñoz	19 January 2009 (aged 17)	(Colombian Football Federation) Barranquilla
15	MF	Santiago Romaña	4 September 2010 (aged 16)	(Colombian Football Federation) Fortaleza
16	MF	Miguel Agámez	15 May 2009 (aged 17)	(Colombian Football Federation) Barranquilla
17	DF	Weiner Martínez	15 March 2010 (aged 16)	(Colombian Football Federation) Envigado
18	MF	Luis Maturana	20 July 2009 (aged 17)	(Colombian Football Federation) Independiente Medellín
19	MF	José Escorcia	4 July 2009 (aged 17)	(Colombian Football Federation) Atlético Nacional
20	DF	Juan José Fori	30 January 2010 (aged 16)	(Colombian Football Federation) C.D. Estudiantil
21	GK	Camilo Blandón	17 April 2009 (aged 17)	(Colombian Football Federation) C.D. Estudiantil

=== Honduras ===
The final squad was announced on 3 November 2026.

Head coach: Merling Paz

No.	Pos.	Player	Date of birth (age)	Club
1	GK	David Paz	18 June 2009 (aged 17)	(United States Soccer Federation) FC Cincinnati 2
2	DF	Kevin Pérez	2 April 2009 (aged 17)	(National Autonomous Federation of Football of Honduras) Génesis PN
3	DF	Alfredo Rodríguez	1 February 2010 (aged 16)	(Royal Spanish Football Federation) Girona
4	DF	Kevin Gyamfi	1 January 2011 (aged 15)	(Royal Spanish Football Federation) RCD Espanyol
5	DF	Denzel Arzú	27 January 2009 (aged 17)	(National Autonomous Federation of Football of Honduras) Olimpia
6	MF	Heiner Reyes	16 April 2009 (aged 17)	(National Autonomous Federation of Football of Honduras) Olimpia
7	FW	Diego Matute	26 September 2009 (aged 17)	(Royal Spanish Football Federation) Celta Vigo
8	MF	Darwin Cruz	3 May 2009 (aged 17)	(National Autonomous Federation of Football of Honduras) AFFI Academia
9	FW	Jeremy Rodríguez	19 August 2009 (aged 17)	(National Autonomous Federation of Football of Honduras) Olimpia
10	FW	Mike Arana	22 January 2009 (aged 17)	(National Autonomous Federation of Football of Honduras) Real España
11	MF	Welson Jiménez	26 January 2009 (aged 17)	(Royal Spanish Football Federation) Girona
12	GK	Juan Quesada	3 August 2009 (aged 17)	(National Autonomous Federation of Football of Honduras) Lobos UPNFM
13	DF	Yago Matute	26 September 2009 (aged 17)	(Royal Spanish Football Federation) Arosa SC
14	MF	Jonathan Claros	25 January 2009 (aged 17)	(National Autonomous Federation of Football of Honduras) Olimpia
15	MF	Christopher Connor	9 March 2011 (aged 15)	(National Autonomous Federation of Football of Honduras) Olimpia
16	MF	Carlos López	4 July 2011 (aged 15)	(United States Soccer Federation) Austin FC
17	FW	Cristopher Batiz	28 March 2011 (aged 15)	(United States Soccer Federation) Tacoma Defiance
18	MF	Yeiron Arzú	11 March 2009 (aged 17)	(National Autonomous Federation of Football of Honduras) Platense
19	FW	Milton Moya	24 February 2009 (aged 17)	(National Autonomous Federation of Football of Honduras) Real España
20	FW	Eduardo Romero	10 April 2009 (aged 17)	(National Autonomous Federation of Football of Honduras) Olimpia
21	GK	Manel Reixach	15 March 2011 (aged 15)	(Royal Spanish Football Federation) Girona

=== Japan ===
The final squad was announced on 2 November 2026.

Head coach: Shingi Ono

No.	Pos.	Player	Date of birth (age)	Club
1	GK	Kosei Oshita	7 August 2009 (aged 17)	(Japan Football Association) Kashima Antlers
2	DF	Riku Hashimoto	14 December 2009 (aged 16)	(Japan Football Association) FC Tokyo
3	DF	Anthony Udemba Motosuna	10 March 2009 (aged 17)	(Japan Football Association) Kashima Antlers
4	DF	Yuzo Takeuchi	27 May 2010 (aged 16)	(Japan Football Association) Nagoya Grampus
5	DF	Koki Kurahashi	5 July 2009 (aged 17)	(Japan Football Association) Kashima Antlers
6	MF	Sora Iwatsuchi	1 May 2009 (aged 17)	(Japan Football Association) Kashima Antlers
7	MF	Takeshi Wada	5 June 2009 (aged 17)	(Japan Football Association) Urawa Red Diamonds
8	MF	Tafuku Satomi	20 April 2009 (aged 17)	(Japan Football Association) Vissel Kobe
9	FW	Eito Takaki	8 August 2009 (aged 17)	(Japan Football Association) Kashima Antlers
10	MF	Maki Kitahara	7 July 2009 (aged 17)	(Japan Football Association) Fujieda MYFC
11	FW	Kakeru Saito	23 February 2009 (aged 17)	(Japan Football Association) Yokohama FC
12	GK	Rento Kida	25 May 2010 (aged 16)	(Japan Football Association) Teikyo Nagaoka High School
13	DF	Chimezie Kai Ezemuokwe	2 April 2009 (aged 17)	(Japan Football Association) Cerezo Osaka
14	MF	Riku Nakashima	28 August 2009 (aged 17)	(Japan Football Association) FC Tokyo
15	MF	Kazato Kimura	16 September 2009 (aged 17)	(Japan Football Association) Kawasaki Frontale
16	MF	Sosuke Hoshi	3 March 2009 (aged 17)	(Japan Football Association) Shoshi High School
17	MF	Yoshiki Fujimoto	2 April 2009 (aged 17)	(Japan Football Association) Gamba Osaka
18	MF	Ryo Igarashi	19 December 2009 (aged 16)	(Japan Football Association) Kashiwa Reysol
19	MF	Arata Okamoto	16 December 2009 (aged 16)	(Japan Football Association) Gamba Osaka
20	DF	Atsuki Sameshima	2 November 2010 (aged 16)	(Japan Football Association) Nagoya Grampus
21	GK	Koki Takahashi	28 February 2009 (aged 17)	(Japan Football Association) Taisei High School

=== Serbia ===
The final squad was announced on 3 November 2026.

Head coach: Igor Matić

No.	Pos.	Player	Date of birth (age)	Club
1	GK	Savo Radanović	28 February 2009 (aged 17)	(Football Association of Serbia) Red Star Belgrade
2	DF	Filip Đurić	28 October 2009 (aged 17)	(Football Association of Serbia) Red Star Belgrade
3	DF	Andrew Marić	20 August 2010 (aged 16)	(Football Association of Serbia) Čukarički
4	MF	Dragan Anokić	24 November 2010 (aged 15)	(Football Association of Serbia) Red Star Belgrade
5	DF	Strahinja Baucal	17 October 2009 (aged 17)	(Football Association of Serbia) Red Star Belgrade
6	DF	Vojin Marinković	14 February 2009 (aged 17)	(Football Association of Serbia) Partizan
7	FW	Nebojša Grujić	2 April 2009 (aged 17)	(Football Association of Serbia) Čukarički
8	MF	Ognjen Matanović	14 January 2010 (aged 16)	(Football Association of Serbia) Red Star Belgrade
9	FW	David Vajagić	1 January 2009 (aged 17)	(German Football Association) VfL Wolfsburg
10	MF	Tadija Cojić	26 June 2009 (aged 17)	(Football Association of Serbia) IMT
11	FW	David Đokić	8 July 2009 (aged 17)	(Football Association of Serbia) Mladost Lučani
12	GK	Veljko Popović	5 August 2010 (aged 16)	(Football Association of Serbia) Teleoptik
13	GK	Matej Pribišić	7 April 2009 (aged 17)	(Football Association of Serbia) IMT
14	DF	Andrej Sibinović	7 October 2009 (aged 17)	(Football Association of Serbia) Red Star Belgrade
15	FW	Tadija Samardžić	3 August 2009 (aged 17)	(German Football Association) Arminia Bielefeld
16	MF	Luka Andrijašević	2 December 2009 (aged 16)	(Football Association of Serbia) Vojvodina
17	DF	Vukašin Davidov	23 April 2009 (aged 17)	(Football Association of Serbia) Vojvodina
18	MF	Novak Stevanović	14 July 2009 (aged 17)	(Football Association of Serbia) Napredak Kruševac
19	FW	Danilo Žarković	13 August 2009 (aged 17)	(Football Association of Serbia) Vojvodina
20	MF	Veljko Pejović	1 February 2009 (aged 17)	(Football Association of Serbia) Vojvodina
21	DF	Matej Strika	20 August 2009 (aged 17)	(Football Association of Serbia) Red Star Belgrade
