= Ssekajugo Elvis =

Ugandan association football player

Elvis Ssekajugo
Personal information
- Full name: Elvis Ssekajugo
- Place of birth: Kampala Uganda
- Position: Midfielder

Team information
- Current team: Express fc

Youth career
- Rays of Grace Academy
- Bukedea Comprehensive School
- Soltilo Bright Stars Junior Team

Senior career*
Years	Team	Apps	(Gls)
2025–2026	Express FC		

International career^{‡}
- Uganda U17
- Uganda U18
- Uganda U20
- * Club domestic league appearances and goals as of 24 May 2025 ‡ National team caps and goals as of 24 May 2025

Ssekajugo Elvis is a Ugandan footballer who plays as a Midfielder. He also captained the Uganda U17 national team. He was also part of the U18 that won the U-18 CECAFA Championship in 2023 in Kenya. He currently plays for Ssingo in the Masaza Cup and BUL FC in the Uganda Premier League.

== Early life and youth career ==
Elvis started his football career from the Rays of Grace Academy where he was part of the generation that elevated the academy’s national status by contributing multiple players to Uganda’s youth national teams. He is known for playing for Bukedea Comprehensive School and Express FC. In 2021, Ssekajugo was named in Uganda’s final squad for the Africa U17 Cup of Nations, hosted in Morocco.

== Club career ==
Ssekajugo progressed from his youth football training into professional football within the Uganda Premier League. He played 2023–24 season for BUL FC which has its home base in Jinja. Multiple matchday reports together with player tracking databases confirm he participated in league matches as a midfielder during that particular season.

== International career ==
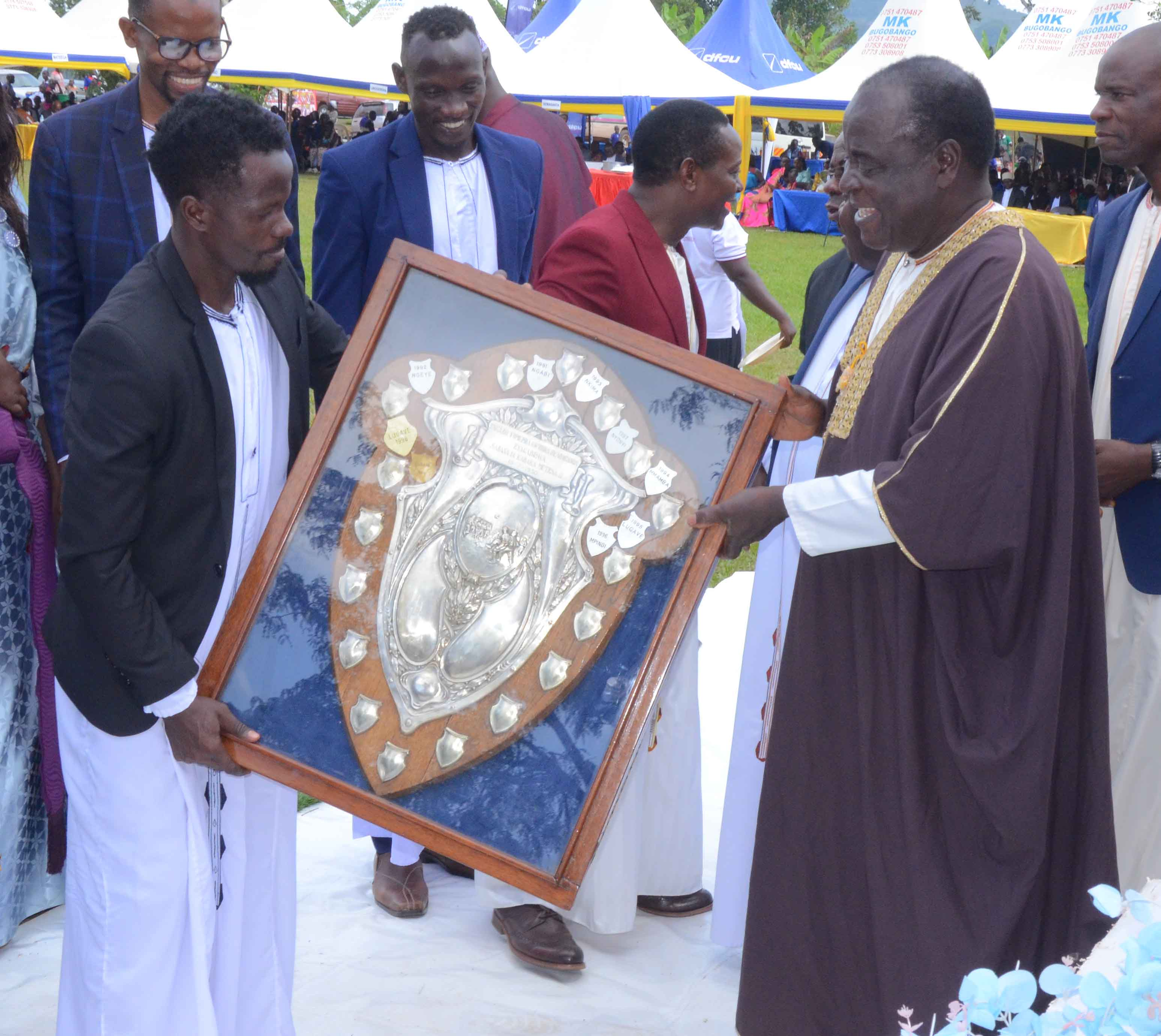
Engabi captain Vianney Ssekajugo (left) hands over the shield they won in the clan games to the grandfather of the clan, Ssaalongo Aloysius Magandaazi.

The Uganda U17 team included him as part of their squad to participate in the AFCON U17 competition which took place in Morocco during 2021. The Uganda U20 team selected him for their final roster to compete in the AFCON U20 CECAFA Zonal Qualifiers which took place in Dar es Salaam Tanzania during October 2024.

== Career statistics ==
As of May 24, 2025:

Season	Club	League	Appearances	Goals
2024–25	BUL FC	Uganda Premier League	12	0
2024–25	BUL FC	Uganda Cup	1	0
Total	–	–	13	0
