= Deniz Ofli =

Turkish footballer (born 2007)

Personal information
- Full name: Deniz Emre Ofli
- Date of birth: 29 March 2007 (age 19)
- Place of birth: Munich, Germany
- Height: 1.75 m (5 ft 9 in)
- Positions: Left-back; left midfielder; left wing-back

Team information
- Current team: Karlsruher SC (on loan from Bayern Munich)
- Number: 3

Youth career
- –2019: 1860 Munich
- 2019–2025: Bayern Munich

Senior career*
| Years | Team | Apps | (Gls) |
| 2025– | Bayern Munich | 1 | (0) |
| 2026– | Bayern Munich II | 9 | (1) |
| 2026– | → Karlsruher SC (loan) | 11 | (1) |

International career^{‡}
| 2022–2023 | Germany U16 | 6 | (0) |
| 2023–2024 | Turkey U17 | 7 | (0) |
| 2024 | Turkey U18 | 8 | (0) |
| 2025– | Turkey U19 | 11 | (0) |
| 2026– | Turkey U21 | 4 | (0) |
- * Club domestic league appearances and goals as of 23:45, 8 November 2026 (UTC) ‡ National team caps and goals as of 13 November 2026

Deniz Emre Ofli (born 29 March 2007) is a professional footballer who plays as a left-back, left midfielder and left wing-back for 2. Bundesliga club Karlsruher SC, on loan from Bayern Munich. Born in Germany, he is a Turkish youth international.

== Club career ==
=== Bayern Munich ===
Ofli is a youth product of 1860 Munich, in 2019 he joined the youth academy of Bundesliga side Bayern Munich with whom he progressed and continued his development. He was one of the players that were called up by Bayern Munich head coach Vincent Kompany for the last 2025 pre-season friendly match against Red Eagles Austria on 23 August 2025, for which he started during a 3–1 win. Ofli was listed as part of the Bayern Munich's senior team squad for the 2025–26 UEFA Champions League.

On 13 November 2025, he signed a contract extension with Bayern Munich until 2028, along with teammate Allen Junior Lambé. Ofli received his first call-up with the Bayern Munich senior team on 21 December 2025, during a 4–0 away win Bundesliga match against 1. FC Heidenheim, as an unused substitute however. He was called up for the 5–0 win friendly match against Austrian Bundesliga club Red Bull Salzburg on 6 January 2026, substituting Hiroki Ito at the 46th minute. Ofli made his professional debut with Bayern Munich II on 24 February 2026, starting for a 1–0 home win Regionalliga Bayern match against SpVgg Unterhaching.

He made his debut with the Bayern Munich senior team on 18 March 2026, during the 4–1 home win UEFA Champions League round of 16 match against Italian Serie A club Atalanta, substituting Aleksandar Pavlović at the 55th minute. Three days later, on 21 March, Ofli was called up with the Bayern Munich senior team for the 4–0 home win Bundesliga match against Union Berlin, as an unused substitute. A month later, on April 19th, he made his Bundesliga debut, substituting Josip Stanišić at the 85th minute of a 4–2 home win over VfB Stuttgart, simultaneously winning the 2025–26 Bundesliga and the 35th league title with the club.

Ofli scored his first professional goal with Bayern Munich II, during a 5–0 away win Regionalliga Bayern match against Viktoria Aschaffenburg, on 16 May 2026.

==== Loan to Karlsruher SC ====
On 4 July 2026, he joined 2. Bundesliga club Karlsruher SC, on loan for the 2026–27 season.

== International career ==
Born in Munich, Germany, Ofli holds dual German and Turkish citizenship, being eligible to represent either nation. He played six games with the Germany national under-16 team, but later switched to play with Turkey, which he has represented at the U17, U18, U19 and U21 levels since 2023.

== Career statistics ==
As of match played 11 October 2026

Appearances and goals by club, season and competition
| Club | Season | League | | | Cup (Note: Includes DFB-Pokal) | | Europe | | Other | | Total | |
| Club | Season | Division | Apps | Goals | Apps | Goals | Apps | Goals | Apps | Goals | Apps | Goals |
|---|---|---|---|---|---|---|---|---|---|---|---|---|
| Bayern Munich | 2025–26 | Bundesliga | 1 | 0 | 0 | 0 | 1 (Note: Appearance in UEFA Champions League) | 0 | 0 | 0 | 2 | 0 |
| Bayern Munich | Total | | 1 | 0 | 0 | 0 | 1 | 0 | 0 | 0 | 2 | 0 |
| Bayern Munich II | 2025–26 | Regionalliga Bayern | 9 | 1 | — | | — | | — | | 9 | 1 |
| Bayern Munich II | Total | | 9 | 1 | — | | — | | 0 | 0 | 9 | 1 |
| Karlsruher SC (loan) | 2026–27 | 2. Bundesliga | 7 | 1 | 1 | 0 | — | | — | | 9 | 1 |
| Karlsruher SC (loan) | Total | | 7 | 0 | 1 | 0 | — | | 0 | 0 | 8 | 0 |
| Career Total | | | 17 | 1 | 1 | 0 | 1 | 0 | 0 | 0 | 19 | 1 |

== Honours ==
Bayern Munich

- Bundesliga: 2025–26
