= ASG =

ASG may refer to:

== Businesses and organizations ==
- Abu Sayyaf Group, a militant Islamist group based in the Philippines
- Gomera Socialist Group, (Agrupación Socialista Gomera) a left-wing Spanish political party operating on the island of La Gomera in the Canary Islands
- Albright Stonebridge Group (est. 2009), a global business strategy firm based in Washington, D.C., United States
- All Saints Greek Orthodox Grammar School, in New South Wales, Australia
- American Society of Genealogists
- Labour and Social Justice – The Electoral Alternative (Arbeit & soziale Gerechtigkeit), a left-wing German political party founded in 2005
- ASG Technologies, formerly known as Allen Systems Group, headquartered in Naples, Florida
- AS Gien, a French association football club
- Astronomical Society of Glasgow
- Australasian Seabird Group, a special interest group of Birds Australia
- Avia Solutions Group global aerospace business group founded in Lithuania

== Science and technology ==
- Abstract semantic graph, in computer science, a form of abstract syntax
- Australian Standard Garratt, a World War II-era Australian steam-engine locomotive model

== Other uses ==
- ASG (band), from Wilmington, North Carolina
- Alsager railway station, Cheshire, England (national rail code)
- Ashburton Aerodrome, New Zealand (IATA airport code)
- Austrian Standard German, the variety of Standard German written and spoken in Austria
