= Sean Spaight =

Irish footballer (born 2009)

Personal information
- Full name: Sean Jake Spaight
- Date of birth: 25 January 2009 (age 17)
- Place of birth: Blackrock, County Louth, Ireland
- Height: 1.68 m (5 ft 6 in)
- Position: Defender

Team information
- Current team: Dundalk
- Number: 19

Youth career
- Rock Celtic
- Dundalk

Senior career*
Years	Team	Apps	(Gls)
2024–	Dundalk	9	(0)

International career^{‡}
2023–2024	Republic of Ireland U15	11	(0)
2024–2025	Republic of Ireland U16	9	(1)
2025–	Republic of Ireland U17	21	(0)
- * Club domestic league appearances and goals as of 17:00, 10 November 2026 (UTC) ‡ National team caps and goals as of 21:14, 21 November 2026 (UTC)

Sean Jake Spaight (born 25 January 2009) is an Irish professional footballer who plays as a defender for League of Ireland Premier Division club Dundalk.

== Club career ==
=== Early career ===
A native of Blackrock, County Louth, Spaight began playing football with local club Rock Celtic, before joining the academy at Dundalk.

=== Dundalk ===
Spaight's first involvement with the first team at Dundalk was on 1 November 2024 when he was an unused substitute on the bench in the final game of the season away to Drogheda United. On 20 January 2025, he made his first team debut aged 15 in a 2–1 defeat to Usher Celtic in the Leinster Senior Cup. He made his league debut for the club on 7 March 2025, replacing Sean Keogh from the bench as a late substitute in a 2–2 draw with Treaty United at Oriel Park. He made eight appearances in all competitions in his breakthrough season, as his side won the 2025 League of Ireland First Division to gain promotion back to the Premier Division, before also winning the 2024–25 Leinster Senior Cup on 26 October 2025 by defeating St Patrick's Athletic 2–1 in the final. On 20 March 2026, he made his League of Ireland Premier Division debut in a 1–1 draw away to Bohemians, with Spaight forcing an own goal from Bohs goalkeeper Kacper Chorążka in the 59th minute, as manager Ciarán Kilduff praised his performance after the match stating "He didn't look out of place at all" despite his young age.

== International career ==
In November 2023, Spaight received his first callup to the Republic of Ireland U15 team, for a UEFA Development Tournament in Serbia. He made his debut for the side on 21 November 2023, in a 3–1 victory over Greece U15. Two days later, he captained the side for the first time, as they beat Serbia U15 on penalties following a 1–1 draw. On 29 September 2024, he made his debut for the Republic of Ireland U16s in a 2–2 draw with Belgium U16. On 10 October 2024, he scored his first international goal, the winner in a 3–2 win over Wales U16 in the Victory Shield. He captained the U16s to the Victory Shield title and was also nominated for the U15 Player of the Year award in November 2024 for his excellent performances for the side. On 7 June 2025, Spaight made his Republic of Ireland U17 debut, in a 2–0 defeat to Turkey U18 in a friendly. Spaight was named in the squad for the 2025 FIFA U-17 World Cup in Qatar in November 2025, the first time his country had ever reached the tournament. On 31 March 2026, he was part of the side that secured back to back FIFA U-17 World Cup qualifications following a 7–0 victory over Slovakia U17. In November 2026, he was named in the squad for the 2026 FIFA U-17 World Cup.

== Career statistics ==
As of match played on 16 August 2026

Appearances and goals by club, season and competition
Club	Season	League			National Cup (Note: Includes FAI Cup)		Other		Total	
Club	Season	Division	Apps	Goals	Apps	Goals	Apps	Goals	Apps	Goals
Dundalk	2024	LOI Premier Division	0	0	0	0	0	0	0	0
Dundalk	2025	LOI First Division	5	0	1	0	2 (Note: Appearances in the Leinster Senior Cup)	0	8	0
Dundalk	2026	LOI Premier Division	4	0	2	0	5	0	11	0
Dundalk	Total		9	0	3	0	7	0	19	0
Career total			9	0	3	0	7	0	19	0

== Honours ==
Dundalk

- League of Ireland First Division: 2025
- Leinster Senior Cup: 2024–25
