= Aristide Hentcho Nseke =

Cameroonian footballer (born 2008)

Personal information
- Full name: Aristide Fleury Hentcho Nseke
- Date of birth: 27 February 2008 (age 18)
- Place of birth: Frankfurt, Germany
- Positions: Winger; forward

Team information
- Current team: Bayern Munich II

Youth career
- –2022: Mainz 05
- 2022–: Bayern Munich

Senior career*
Years	Team	Apps	(Gls)
2026–	Bayern Munich II	4	(0)
- * Club domestic league appearances and goals as of 24 July 2026

Aristide Fleury Hentcho Nseke (born 27 February 2008) is a German-Cameroonian professional footballer who plays as a winger and forward for Regionalliga Bayern club Bayern Munich II.

== Club career ==
Hentcho Nseke was born in Frankfurt, Germany, and is a youth product of Mainz 05, later moving to the youth academy of Bundesliga giants Bayern Munich along with his two younger brothers Aviel and Alex, in 2022.

He received his first call-up with Bayern Munich II on 6 April 2026, during a 1–0 home win Regionalliga Bayern match against DJK Vilzing, as an unused substitute however. Hentcho Nseke made his professional debut as a starter during a 4–1 away loss Regionalliga Bayern match against 1. FC Nürnberg II, on 21 April. Three days later he started once again for Bayern Munich II, during a 1–0 home win Regionalliga Bayern match against TSV Aubstadt, on April 24. Six days later, on April 30, Hentcho Nseke made his third appearance with Bayern Munich II during a 4–0 away loss Regionalliga Bayern match against FV Illertissen, substituting Michael Scott at the second half.

== International career ==
Hentcho Nseke is of Cameroonian descent, he was one of the 30 players who were called up, along with fellow Bayern Munich U19 teammate Allen Junior Lambé, for Cameroon U23 by head coach Guy Feutchine in March 2026.

== Career statistics ==
As of match played 24 July 2026

Appearances and goals by club, season and competition
Club	Season	League			Cup		Total			
Club	Season	Division	Apps	Goals	Apps	Goals	Apps	Goals		
Bayern Munich II	2025–26	Regionalliga Bayern	3	0	—		3	0		
Bayern Munich II	2026–27	Regionalliga Bayern	1	0	—		—		1	0
Bayern Munich II	Total		4	0	—		4	0		
Career Total			4	0	0	0	4	0		
