= Allen Junior Lambé =

German footballer (born 2008)

Personal information
- Full name: Allen Junior Lambé
- Date of birth: 20 August 2008 (age 18)
- Place of birth: Karlsruhe, Germany
- Height: 1.89 m (6 ft 2 in)
- Positions: Midfielder; centre-back

Team information
- Current team: Bayern Munich II

Youth career
- –2019: SG Siemens Karlsruhe
- 2019–2023: Karlsruher SC
- 2023–: Bayern Munich

Senior career*
Years	Team	Apps	(Gls)
2026–	Bayern Munich II	16	(3)

International career^{‡}
2026–	Germany U18	1	(0)
- * Club domestic league appearances and goals as of 7 November 2026 ‡ National team caps and goals as of 26 May 2026

Allen Junior Lambé (born 20 August 2008) is a German professional footballer who plays as a midfielder and centre-back for Regionalliga Bayern club Bayern Munich II. He is a German youth international.

== Club career ==
Lambé is a youth product of SG Siemens Karlsruhe, in 2019 he joined the youth academy of Karlsruher SC, after four years he then joined the youth academy of Bundesliga side Bayern Munich in 2023, with whom he progressed and continued his development. On late 2025, he was called up by Bayern Munich's head coach Vincent Kompany to train with the senior team squad.

On 13 November 2025, Lambé signed a contract extension with Bayern Munich until 2028, along with teammate Deniz Ofli.

On early 2026, multiple clubs showed interest in recruiting him, including French Ligue 1 club Marseille, Dutch Eredivisie club PSV, as well as both Italian Serie A clubs Roma and Atalanta.

He received his first call-up with Bayern Munich II on 13 March 2026, during a 2–2 home draw Regionalliga Bayern match against FC Memmingen, as an unused substitute however.

Lambé made his professional debut and scored his first professional goal with Bayern Munich II, substituting Bogdan Olychenko during a 1–1 home draw Regionalliga Bayern match against VfB Eichstätt, on May 8 2026. Eight days later, he started for the first time with Bayern Munich II, also scoring the fourth goal during a 5–0 away win Regionalliga Bayern match against Viktoria Aschaffenburg, on May 16.

== International career ==
Lambé was born in Karlsruhe, Germany, and is of Cameroonian descent, his double citizenship makes him eligible to represent either nation.

He was one of the 30 players who were called up, along with fellow Bayern Munich U19 teammate Aristide Hentcho Nseke, for Cameroon U23 by head coach Guy Feutchine in March 2026.

Lambé debuted with the Germany U18s on 26 May 2026, during a 2–1 loss against Tunisia U18.

== Career statistics ==
As of match played 7 November 2026

Appearances and goals by club, season and competition
Club	Season	League			Cup		Total			
Club	Season	Division	Apps	Goals	Apps	Goals	Apps	Goals		
Bayern Munich II	2025–26	Regionalliga Bayern	2	2	—		2	2		
Bayern Munich II	2026–27	Regionalliga Bayern	14	1	—		—		14	1
Bayern Munich II	Total		16	3	—		16	3		
Career Total			16	3	0	0	16	3		
