= Gorka Abascal =

Colombian footballer (born 2010)

Personal information
- Full name: Gorka Abascal Martínez
- Date of birth: 1 October 2010 (age 16)
- Place of birth: Bilbao, Spain
- Height: 1.92 m (6 ft 4 in)
- Position: Midfielder

Team information
- Current team: Real Madrid CF

Youth career
- –2017: SD Deusto
- 2017–2024: Danok Bat CF
- 2024–2025: Athletic Bilbao
- 2025–: Real Madrid CF

International career^{‡}
Years	Team	Apps	(Gls)
2025	Spain U16	3	(0)
2026–	Colombia U17	4	(0)
- ‡ National team caps and goals as of 3 October 2026

Gorka Abascal Martínez (born 1 October 2010) is a footballer who plays as a midfielder for Real Madrid. Born in Spain, he has represented Spain and Colombia internationally at youth level.

== Early life ==
Abascal was born on 1 October 2010 in Spain. Born to a Colombian father and a Spanish mother, he obtained Colombian citizenship and Spanish citizenship.

== Club career ==
As a youth player, Abascal joined the youth academy of Spanish side SD Deusto. Following his stint there, he joined the youth academy of Spanish side Danok Bat CF in Spain.

Subsequently, he joined the youth academy of Athletic Bilbao in Spain. Ahead of the 2025–26 season, he joined the youth academy of Spanish La Liga outfit Real Madrid CF, helping the club's under-16 team win the league title.

== International career ==
Abascal is a Spain and Colombia youth international and has represented the former internationally at under-16 levels and the latter internationally at under-17 level. Altogether, he made three appearances and scored zero goals while playing for the Spain national under-16 football team.

On 24 September 2026, he debuted for the Colombia national under-17 football team during a 2–3 away friendly loss to the England national under-17 football team. During the autumn of 2026, he played for the Colombia national under-17 football team at the 2026 FIFA U-17 World Cup.

== Style of play ==
Abascal plays as a midfielder. Colombian newspaper El Espectador wrote in 2026 that he "is a midfielder of good height and physical build, with technique, ball control, and the personality to contribute in different areas of the field... can play as a defensive midfielder, central midfielder, or attacking midfielder, a versatility that expands his options on the field. His vision, quality of his first touch, and ability to organize the midfield are some of the attributes that make him an interesting player".
