= LHM =

LHM or lhm may refer to:

- Lafayette History Museum
- Langer Heinrich Mine, a mine located in western Namibia
- Left-handed material, in negative-index metamaterial
- Liquide hydraulique minéral, for hydropneumatic suspension
- Central Tibetan language (ISO 639 code:lhm)
- Lutheran Hour Ministries, a Christian outreach ministry
- Larry Hedrick Motorsports, a former NASCAR team
- Lincoln Regional Airport (California) (FAA LID code: LHM), California, US
- Localised Harmonic Motion is a method of imaging for focused ultrasound surgery targeting
- Latent Hierarchical Model is a variable regression model
- Lu, Hager, and Mjolsness method is a method of pose estimation in video images
- Liebherr LHM series harbor mobile cranes
