= Holmes Junior =

Spanish footballer (born 2009)

Personal information
- Full name: Holmes Junior Zamorano Muñoz
- Date of birth: 8 August 2009 (age 17)
- Place of birth: Reus, Spain
- Position: Centre-back

Team information
- Current team: Girona
- Number: 38

Youth career
- Reus
- 2019–2021: Espanyol
- 2021–2024: Real Madrid
- 2024–2025: Gimnàstic
- 2025–2026: Girona

Senior career*
Years	Team	Apps	(Gls)
2026–	Girona	7	(1)

International career^{‡}
2025	Spain U16	3	(0)
2025–2026	Spain U17	18	(1)
2026–	Spain U18	4	(1)
- * Club domestic league appearances and goals as of 12 October 2026 ‡ National team caps and goals as of 3 October 2026

Holmes Junior Zamorano Muñoz (born 8 August 2009), known as Holmes Junior, is a Spanish footballer who plays as a centre-back for Girona FC.

== Club career ==
Born in Reus, Tarragona, Catalonia to Colombian parents, Holmes Junior joined Real Madrid's La Fábrica in June 2021, from RCD Espanyol. He left the club in 2024 and moved to Gimnàstic de Tarragona, and impressed with the Cadete A squad before signing for Girona FC on 3 July 2025.

In July 2026, aged 16, Holmes Junior spent the pre-season with Girona's first team. On 16 August, before even having appeared for the reserves, he made his professional debut by starting in a 1–1 Segunda División home draw against CD Leganés; aged 17 years and eight days, he became the fourth-youngest player to debut for the club. Three days later, he renewed his contract until 2029.

== International career ==
Holmes Junior represented Spain at under-16 and under-17 levels.

== Career statistics ==
As of match played 27 October 2026

Appearances and goals by club, season and competition
Club	Season	League			Cup		Europe		Other		Total	
Club	Season	Division	Apps	Goals	Apps	Goals	Apps	Goals	Apps	Goals	Apps	Goals
Girona	2026–27	Segunda División	7	1	1	0	—		—		8	1
Career total			7	1	1	0	0	0	0	0	8	1
