= Sunil Kumar =

Sunil Kumar may refer to:

- Sunil Kumar (academic administrator), Indian American college administrator
- Sunil Kumar (born 1957), Indian politician, member of the Bihar Legislative Assembly from Biharsharif
- Sunil Kumar (born 1960), Indian politician, member of the Bihar Legislative Assembly from Bhore Vidhansabha
- Sunil Kumar, known as Simple Suni, Indian filmmaker
- Sunil Kumar (kabaddi), Indian athlete
- V. Sunil Kumar, Indian politician, member of the Karnataka Legislative Assembly from Karkala
- Sunil Kumar (wrestler), Indian wrestler

== See also ==
- Sunil Kumar Kushwaha, Indian politician, Lok Sabha member from Bihar
