= Kiki Ramos =

Haitian footballer (born 2009)

Personal information
- Full name: Stephen Oscar Ramos
- Date of birth: 3 April 2009 (age 17)
- Place of birth: Port-au-Prince, Haiti
- Height: 1.75 m (5 ft 9 in)
- Position: Winger

Team information
- Current team: Vélez

Youth career
- 2015–: Vélez

International career^{‡}
Years	Team	Apps	(Gls)
2026	Argentina U17	2	(1)
- ‡ National team caps and goals as of 30 July 2026

Stephen Oscar "Kiki" Ramos (born 3 April 2009) is a Haitian footballer who plays as a winger for the youth sector of Argentine club Vélez.

A former Argentina U17 international, Ramos committed to the Haiti national under-17 team.

== Early life ==
Ramos was born on 3 April 2009 in Port-au-Prince, Haiti. While living in an orphanage as a baby he survived the 2010 Haiti earthquake. At eight months old, he was adopted by Argentine parents.

One month later, he moved to Argentina. Growing up, he started playing football at the age of two and was nicknamed "Kiki" and regarded Brazil international Neymar as his football idol.

== Club career ==
As a youth player, Ramos joined the youth academy of Argentine side Vélez at the age of six after receiving encouragement from a neighbor who supported Argentine side Vélez. Initially, he wore the number seven jersey before switching to the number nine jersey and later the number eleven jersey while playing for the club.

At the age of fourteen, he was regarded as one of the under-15 team's most important players. In 2025, he suffered injuries, which led to him being sidelined. One year later, he was promoted to their under-17 team. On 2 June 2026, he scored four goals for them during a win over Atlético de Rafaela.

== International career ==
On 28 July 2026, Ramos debuted for the Argentina national under-17 team in a 2–1 friendly home win with Ecuador. He became the first player of Caribbean descent to represent Argentina internationally. Two days later, he scored his first goal for Argentina in a 1–1 friendly draw against the same opponent.

On 8 November 2026, Ramos joined the Haiti national under-17 team. He was called up for the 2026 FIFA U-17 World Cup.

== Style of play ==
Ramos plays as a winger. He is left-footed and has received comparisons to Brazil international Vinícius Júnior based on their physical appearance.

Argentine newspaper Clarín wrote in 2026 that he "plays as a winger and stands out for his speed, his ability to unbalance defenses in one-on-one situations, and his impressive goal-scoring prowess".
