= Kevin Gyamfi =

Honduran footballer (born 2011)

Personal information
- Full name: Kevin Gyamfi González
- Date of birth: 1 January 2011 (age 15)
- Place of birth: Barcelona, Spain
- Height: 1.91 m (6 ft 3 in)
- Position: Defender

Team information
- Current team: Espanyol

Youth career
- Years: Team
- Damm
- Espanyol

Kevin Gyamfi González (born 1 January 2011) is a footballer who plays as a defender for Espanyol. Born in Spain, he has been called up to represent Honduras internationally.

== Early life ==
Gyamfi was born on 1 January 2011 in Spain. Born to a Ghanaian father and a Honduran mother, he obtained a Spanish passport.

== Club career ==
As a youth player, Gyamfi joined the youth academy of Spanish side Damm. Following his stint there, he joined the youth academy of Spanish outfit Espanyol.

During the 2025–26 season, he made twenty-five league appearances and scored one goal while playing for the club's under-15 team.

== International career ==
Gyamfi has been called up to represent Honduras internationally and is eligible to represent Ghana internationally through his father and Spain internationally, having been born in the country.

In 2026, he was first called up to the Honduras national team after an arranged meeting with Spanish Football Federation of Honduras sporting director Francis Hernández in Spain.

== Style of play ==
Gyamfi plays as a defender. Honduran newspaper Diario Diez wrote in 2026 that "standing at around 1.86 meters tall, the defender is known for his imposing physique, his aerial prowess, and his remarkable tactical awareness... hese conditions allow him to perform very well both in the central defender position and in the right full-back position".
