= Aviel Hentcho Nseke =

Cameroonian footballer (born 2009)

Personal information
- Full name: Aviel Fortune Hentcho Nseke
- Date of birth: 14 November 2009 (age 17)
- Place of birth: Frankfurt, Germany
- Height: 1.75 m (5 ft 9 in)
- Positions: Winger; attacking midfielder

Team information
- Current team: Bayern Munich U19

Youth career
- –2022: Mainz 05
- 2022–: Bayern Munich

Senior career*
Years	Team	Apps	(Gls)
2026–	Bayern Munich II	0	(0)
- * Club domestic league appearances and goals as of 24 July 2026

Aviel Fortune Hentcho Nseke (born 14 November 2009) is a German-Cameroonian footballer who plays as a winger and attacking midfielder for the under-19 team (U19 DFB-Nachwuchsliga) of Bundesliga club Bayern Munich.

== Club career ==
Hentcho Nseke, like his older brother Aristide, was born in Frankfurt, Germany, and is a youth product of Mainz 05, the two of them later moved to the youth academy of Bundesliga giants Bayern Munich along with their younger brother Alex, in 2022.

After progressing through the academy, he eventually got called up with Bayern Munich II on the first matchday of the 2026–27 season by head coach Dante, as an unused substitute for the 1–0 home loss Regionalliga Bayern match against SC Eltersdorf, on 24 July 2026.

== International career ==
Hentcho Nseke is of Cameroonian descent, he was one of the 21 players who were called up with the Cameroon U17s on 11 November 2026, by head coach Thomas Libiih for the 2026 FIFA U-17 World Cup in Qatar.
