= Rafa Cruz =

Spanish footballer

Personal information
- Full name: Rafael Cruz Suárez
- Date of birth: 24 October 2009 (age 17)
- Place of birth: Las Palmas, Spain
- Position: Winger

Team information
- Current team: Las Palmas
- Number: 32

Youth career
- 2016–2018: Veteranos del Pilar
- 2018–2023: Las Palmas
- 2023–2025: Real Madrid
- 2025–2026: Las Palmas

Senior career*
| Years | Team | Apps | (Gls) |
| 2026– | Las Palmas | 6 | (0) |
- * Club domestic league appearances and goals as of 19 October 2026

Rafael "Rafa" Cruz Suárez (born 24 October 2009) is a Spanish footballer who plays as a right winger for UD Las Palmas.

== Career ==
Born in Las Palmas, Canary Islands, Cruz began his career with Veteranos del Pilar CF before joining UD Las Palmas' youth categories in 2018. In June 2023, he moved to Real Madrid's La Fábrica, but left the club 18 months later to return to the Amarillos.

In April 2026, Cruz began training with the first team after impressing manager Luis García. In June, he was included in the pre-season of the main squad, and made his professional debut on 16 August, coming on as a second-half substitute for Jesé in a 2–1 Segunda División home win over Albacete Balompié; aged 16 years, nine months and 23 days, he became the third-youngest to debut for the club, behind Omar Fleitas and Pedri.

== Personal life ==
Cruz's twin brother Jorge is also a footballer and a winger. Both played together in the youth sides of Las Palmas.
