= ASG Technologies =

American software company

- Type: Private
- Founded: 1986; 40 years ago
- Headquarters: Naples, Florida, United States
- Key people: Charles Sansbury (CEO); Swamy Viswanathan (EVP & Chief Product Officer); Dilip Upmanya (CFO)
- Services: Information Management and IT Systems Management
- Website: www.asg.com/en/

ASG Technologies Group, Inc., doing business as ASG Technologies, is a provider of enterprise information management and IT System Management Solutions Software.

== History, acquisitions and funding ==
ASG Technologies was founded in 1986 by Arthur L. Allen as Allen Systems Group.

In 2015, Allen Systems Group turned into ASG Technologies Group under a consortium of new owners led by KKR & Co. L.P. and Evergreen Coast Capital, with Charles Sansbury as CEO.

In 2016, the company had an estimated 3,000 customers across 60 countries and 41 offices worldwide.

On March 7, 2018, ASG acquired Mowbly, an innovative business process mobility platform company.

On April 12, 2021, Rocket Software announced it has signed a definitive agreement to acquire ASG Technologies,
