= Andrej Sibinović =

Serbian footballer (born 2009)

Personal information
- Full name: Andrej Sibinović
- Date of birth: 7 October 2009 (age 17)
- Place of birth: Belgrade, Serbia
- Height: 1.80 m (5 ft 11 in)
- Position: Midfielder

Team information
- Current team: Red Star Belgrade
- Number: 66

Youth career
- –2024: Teleoptik
- 2025–2026: Čukarički
- 2026–: Red Star Belgrade

Senior career*
| Years | Team | Apps | (Gls) |
| 2026– | Red Star Belgrade | 2 | (0) |
- * Club domestic league appearances and goals

Andrej Sibinović (Serbian Cyrillic: Андреј Сибиновић; born 7 October 2009) is a Serbian professional footballer who plays as a midfielder for Red Star Belgrade.

== Early life ==
Sibinović was born on 7 October 2009. Born in Belgrade, Serbia, he is a native of the city.

== Career ==
As a youth player, Sibinović joined the youth academy of Teleoptik. Following his stint there, he joined the youth academy of Čukarički in 2025.

During the summer of 2026, he joined the youth academy of Red Star Belgrade after the director of the club's youth academy had a conversation with his father. During the 2026–27 season, he recorded seven assists in his first seven league appearances for their under-19 team. On 18 October 2026, he debuted for the Crveno-beli senior team during a 5–1 home win over Mladost in the league.

== Style of play ==
Sibinović plays as a midfielder. Serbian news website MaxBet Sport wrote in 2026 that he "can primarily respond in the position of the rear midfielder, but if necessary, he can also cover the position of stopper... his defensive style of play is particularly interesting. With long legs and a good sense of space, he can close the opponent... while his toughness in duels allows him to be useful even when the team loses the ball".
