= Jandry Calle =

Ecuadorian footballer (born 2009)

Personal information
- Full name: Jandry Isaac Calle Caicedo
- Date of birth: 17 June 2009 (age 17)
- Height: 1.73 m (5 ft 8 in)
- Positions: Attacking midfielder; right winger

Team information
- Current team: LDU Quito

Youth career
- LDU Quito

Senior career*
Years	Team	Apps	(Gls)
2026–	LDU Quito	0	(0)

International career^{‡}
2026	Ecuador U17	6	(0)
- * Club domestic league appearances and goals as of 16:53, 24 June 2026 (UTC) ‡ National team caps and goals as of 16:53, 24 June 2026 (UTC)

Jandry Isaac Calle Caicedo (born 17 June 2009) is an Ecuadorian footballer who currently plays as a attacking midfielder for LDU Quito.

== Club career ==
Ahead of LDU Quito's Under-19 Youth Championship final against Universidad Católica in December 2025, Calle was given the number 10 shirt, an honour that had last been given to Sebastián González in 2022, and had been vacant for the four years following his promotion to the first team. Calle was involved in first team training ahead of LDU Quito's 2026 pre-season, having signed his first professional contract - running until 2028 - just months earlier. He is seen as one of the club's brightest young talents.

== Style of play ==
Capable of playing as both an attacking midfielder and right-winger, Calle is noted for his dribbling and change of pace, with the ability to cut in from the right wing onto his stronger left foot.

== Career statistics ==
As of 24 June 2026.

Appearances and goals by club, season and competition
Club	Season	League			Cup (Note: Includes Copa Ecuador)		Continental		Other		Total	
Club	Season	Division	Apps	Goals	Apps	Goals	Apps	Goals	Apps	Goals	Apps	Goals
LDU Quito	2026	LigaPro Serie A	0	0	0	0	0	0	—		0	0
Career total			0	0	0	0	0	0	0	0	0	0
