= Rays of Grace Academy =

Ugandan association football academy

The Rays of Grace Academy is a Ugandan association football academy based in Njeru Municipality of Buikwe District. Rays of Grace Academy were crowned the inaugural winners of the FUFA Primary Schools championship Odilo Champions in August 2019 as well in 2022 they defended the title emerging the winners of the 2022 edition.

== History ==
The Rays of Grace Academy was established in 2015 by Robert Kiwanuka. In September 2014, he started a school, which is now home to 1000 pupils, 50 of whom are registered under their football academy which is recognized by the Uganda Youth Football Association (UYFA).

The academy comprises over 900 registered students aged between 6–18 years and operates throughout the year from 1 training centre which is found in Njeru Municipality, Buikwe District (2022). Footballers who started their careers at the academy include Travis Mutyaba, Issa Bugembe, Elvis Ssekajugo.

In 2022, Rays of Grace Academy represented Uganda at the Federation of East Africa Secondary Schools Sports Association in Arusha, Tanzania.

== Notable players ==
- Travis Mutyaba
- Issa Bugembe
- Vicent Mulema
- Elvis Ssekajugo
- Arafat Nkoola
- Leonard Kasanya
- Ratib Gulanyago
- Ronald Kigoye
- Faizo Kifumba
- Frank Ssekanjako
- Gideon Jjemba
- Ismael Remo Sampuli
- Mukisa Daniel Kirumira
- Elisa Talema
- Ryan Giggs Osinya
- David Balondemu Lukisi
- Enock Luyima
- Samuel Mubiru
- Peter Abalilya
