= 2013 in Peruvian football =

Football in Peru
- Season: 2013

Men's football
- Torneo Descentralizado: Universitario
- Segunda División: Los Caimanes

The 2013 season in Peruvian football included all the matches of the different national male and female teams, as well as the local club tournaments. It also included the participation of these teams in international competitions in which representatives of the country's teams had participated.

== Peru national football team ==
=== 2014 FIFA World Cup qualification ===
22 March 2013	Peru	1–0	Chile	Estadio Nacional, Lima
21:10 UTC−5	Farfán 87'	Report		Attendance: 60,081; Referee: Diego Abal (Argentina)

7 June 2013	Peru	1–0	Ecuador	Estadio Nacional, Lima
21:10 UTC−5	Pizarro 11'	Report		Attendance: 47,000; Referee: Marcelo Henrique (Brazil)

11 June 2013	Colombia	2–0	Peru	Estadio Metropolitano Roberto Meléndez, Barranquilla
15:30 UTC−5	Falcao 12' (pen.); T. Gutiérrez 45'	Report		Attendance: 42,265; Referee: Sandro Ricci (Brazil)

6 September 2013	Peru	1–2	Uruguay	Estadio Nacional, Lima
21:30 UTC−5	Farfán 84'	Report	Suárez 43' (pen.), 67'	Attendance: 49,222; Referee: Patricio Loustau (Argentina)

10 September 2013	Venezuela	3–2	Peru	Estadio José Antonio Anzoátegui, Puerto La Cruz
19:25 UTC−4:30	Rondón 36'; C. González 59' (pen.); Otero 76'	Report	Hurtado 19'; Zambrano 86'	Attendance: 40,049; Referee: Néstor Pitana (Argentina)

11 October 2013	Argentina	3–1	Peru	Estadio Monumental Antonio Vespucio Liberti, Buenos Aires
20:00 UTC−3	Lavezzi 23', 34'; Palacio 47'	Report	Pizarro 20'	Attendance: 48,977; Referee: Carlos Vera (Ecuador)

15 October 2013	Peru	1–1	Bolivia	Estadio Nacional, Lima
21:15 UTC−5	Yotún 18'	Report	Bejarano 45'	Attendance: 0 Referee: Enrique Cáceres (Paraguay

== Peru national under-20 football team ==
=== South American Youth Football Championship ===
Squad

Coach: Daniel Ahmed (Argentina)

No.	Pos.	Player	Date of birth (age)	Caps	Goals	Club
1	GK	Andy Vidal	23 August 1994 (aged 18)			(Peruvian Football Federation) Sporting Cristal
2	DF	Carlos Patrón	30 March 1993 (aged 19)			(Peruvian Football Federation) Universitario de Deportes
3	DF	Marcos Ortiz	27 March 1993 (aged 19)			(Peruvian Football Federation) Sporting Cristal
4	DF	Renato Tapia	28 July 1995 (aged 17)			(Peruvian Football Federation) Esther Grande
5	DF	Miguel Araujo	24 October 1994 (aged 18)			(Peruvian Football Federation) Sport Huancayo
6	MF	Hernán Hinostroza	21 December 1993 (aged 18)			(Royal Belgian Football Association) Zulte Waregem
7	DF	Claudio Torrejón	14 May 1993 (aged 19)			(Peruvian Football Federation) Sporting Cristal
8	MF	Rafael Guarderas	12 September 1993 (aged 19)			(Peruvian Football Federation) Universitario de Deportes
9	FW	Iván Bulos	20 May 1993 (aged 19)			(Royal Belgian Football Association) Sint-Truidense
10	FW	Víctor Cedrón	6 October 1993 (aged 19)			(Peruvian Football Federation) Universidad César Vallejo
11	FW	Andy Polo	29 September 1994 (aged 18)			(Peruvian Football Federation) Universitario de Deportes
12	GK	Ángelo Campos	27 April 1993 (aged 19)			(Peruvian Football Federation) Alianza Lima
13	DF	Diego Chávez	7 March 1993 (aged 19)			(Peruvian Football Federation) Universitario de Deportes
14	FW	Cristian Benavente	19 May 1994 (aged 18)			(Royal Spanish Football Federation) Real Madrid
15	MF	Edison Flores	15 May 1994 (aged 18)			(Royal Spanish Football Federation) Villarreal B
16	DF	Max Barrios	15 September 1995 (aged 17)			(Peruvian Football Federation) Juan Aurich
17	FW	Yordy Reyna	17 September 1993 (aged 19)			(Peruvian Football Federation) Alianza Lima
18	FW	Jean Deza	9 June 1993 (aged 19)			(Slovak Football Association) MŠK Žilina
19	MF	Wilder Cartagena	23 September 1994 (aged 18)			(Peruvian Football Federation) Alianza Lima
20	DF	Alexi Gómez	4 March 1993 (aged 19)			(Peruvian Football Federation) León de Huánuco
21	MF	Raziel García	15 February 1994 (aged 18)			(Peruvian Football Federation) Universidad San Martín
22	GK	Patricio Álvarez	24 January 1994 (aged 18)			(Peruvian Football Federation) Universitario de Deportes

First stage

10 January 2013	Uruguay	3–3	Peru	Estadio del Bicentenario, San Juan
22:15	López 40'; Bentancourt 53'; Rolán 55'	Report	Reyna 19'; Gómez 44'; Benavente 87' (pen.)	Attendance: 400; Referee: Enrique Cáceres (Paraguay)

14 January 2013	Peru	1–0	Venezuela	Estadio del Bicentenario, San Juan
20:00	Benavente 36' (pen.)	Report		Attendance: 700; Referee: Julio Bascuñán (Chile)

16 January 2013	Ecuador	2–1	Peru	Estadio del Bicentenario, San Juan
22:15	Esterilla 79'; Cevallos 83'	Report	Deza 65' (pen.)	Attendance: 1,200; Referee: Enrique Cáceres (Paraguay)

18 January 2013	Brazil	0–2	Peru	Estadio del Bicentenario, San Juan
20:00		Report	Reyna 23'; Flores 90+1'	Attendance: 2,000; Referee: Patricio Loustau (Argentina)

Final stage

20 January 2013	Peru	1–3	Uruguay	Estadio Malvinas Argentinas, Mendoza
19:45	Reyna 42'		Formiliano 12'; López 68'; Rolán 88'	Attendance: 1,000; Referee: Carlos Vera (Ecuador)

23 January 2013	Peru	1–1	Paraguay	Estadio Malvinas Argentinas, Mendoza
19:45	Araujo 28'		Alonso 82'	Attendance: 1,000; Referee: Raúl Orosco (Bolivia)

27 January 2013	Peru	0–1	Colombia	Estadio Malvinas Argentinas, Mendoza
19:45			Quintero 18' (pen.)	Attendance: 1,800; Referee: Patricio Loustau (Argentina)

30 January 2013	Peru	3–2	Ecuador	Estadio Malvinas Argentinas, Mendoza
19:45	Reyna 28', 34'; Polo 83'		Uchuari 52'; Esterilla 70'	Attendance: 2,000; Referee: Marlon Escalante (Venezuela)

3 February 2013	Chile	1–1	Peru	Estadio Malvinas Argentinas, Mendoza
19:15	Rabello 34'		Flores 7'	Attendance: 18,000; Referee: Enrique Cáceres (Paraguay)

== Peru national under-17 football team ==
=== South American U-17 Championship ===
Squad

Manager: Edgar Teixeira

No.	Pos.	Player	Date of birth (age)	Caps	Goals	Club
1	GK	Juniors Barbieri	20 January 1996 (aged 17)			(Peruvian Football Federation) Sporting Cristal
2	DF	Luis Abram	27 February 1996 (aged 17)			(Peruvian Football Federation) Regatas Lima
3	DF	Luis Rivas	5 January 1996 (aged 17)			(Peruvian Football Federation) Academia Cantolao
4	DF	César Hernández	5 February 1996 (aged 17)			(Peruvian Football Federation) Sport Victoria
5	DF	Francisco Duclós	29 January 1996 (aged 17)			(Peruvian Football Federation) Alianza Lima
6	DF	Henry Vega	22 January 1996 (aged 17)			(Peruvian Football Federation) Sporting Cristal
7	FW	Beto da Silva	28 December 1996 (aged 16)			(Peruvian Football Federation) Sporting Cristal
8	MF	Renzo Garcés	12 June 1996 (aged 16)			(Peruvian Football Federation) Universidad San Martín
9	FW	Dangelo Artiaga	15 June 1996 (aged 16)			(Peruvian Football Federation) Universidad San Martín
10	FW	Yamir Oliva	17 January 1996 (aged 17)			(Peruvian Football Federation) Sporting Cristal
11	FW	Roberto Siucho	7 February 1997 (aged 16)			(Peruvian Football Federation) Universitario
12	GK	Ítalo Espinoza	17 April 1996 (aged 16)			(Peruvian Football Federation) Universidad San Martín
13	DF	Diego Zurek	25 May 1996 (aged 16)			(Peruvian Football Federation) Universidad San Martín
14	DF	Camilo Jiménez	2 July 1996 (aged 16)			(Peruvian Football Federation) Universidad San Martín
15	MF	Julio Cabellos	10 February 1996 (aged 17)			(Peruvian Football Federation) Universidad San Martín
16	MF	Claudio Namoc	19 July 1996 (aged 16)			(Peruvian Football Federation) Esther Grande
17	FW	Jhon Barrueta	11 February 1996 (aged 17)			(Peruvian Football Federation) Esther Grande
18	MF	Leonardo Mendoza	27 May 1996 (aged 16)			(Peruvian Football Federation) Academia Cantolao
19	MF	Adrián Ugarriza	1 January 1997 (aged 16)			(Peruvian Football Federation) Universidad San Martín
20	MF	Enmanuel Paucar	9 August 1996 (aged 16)			(Peruvian Football Federation) Esther Grande
21	DF	Junior Morales	22 June 1996 (aged 16)			(Peruvian Football Federation) Esther Grande
22	GK	Patricio Torres	15 January 1996 (aged 17)			(Peruvian Football Federation) Esther Grande
23	FW	Carlos Orbegoso	16 January 1996 (aged 17)			(Peruvian Football Federation) Universidad San Marcos

First stage

3 April 2013	Uruguay	2–0	Peru
17:05	Buschiazzo 22'; K. Méndez 90+1'	Report		Referee: Ulises Mereles, Paraguay

7 April 2013	Peru	1–0	Bolivia
19:10	Artiaga 64'	Report		Referee: Silvio Trucco, Argentina

9 April 2013	Chile	1–1	Peru
19:00	Medel 90+2' (pen.)	Report	Garcés 59'	Referee: Ulises Mereles, Paraguay

11 April 2013	Brazil	3–0	Peru
19:10	Lincoln 29'; Caio Rangel 46'; Kenedy 71'	Report		Referee: Silvio Trucco, Argentina

Final stage

14 April 2013	Argentina	2–0	Peru
19:10	Pérez 42'; Sánchez 51'	Report		Referee: Roddy Zambrano, Ecuador

17 April 2013	Paraguay	3–1	Peru
15:00	A. Sanabria 54'; Medina 65'; J. Sanabria 90+1'	Report	Garcés 72'	Referee: José Jordán, Bolivia

21 April 2013	Venezuela	2–1	Peru
15:00	Ponce 58', 75'	Report	da Silva 34'	Referee: Germán Delfino, Argentina

24 April 2013	Brazil	2–1	Peru
17:05	Kenedy 53'; Ewandro 85'	Report	Garcés 90'	Referee: Julio Bascuñán, Chile

28 April 2013	Uruguay	4–3	Peru
17:05	Acosta 4', 30'; Pizzichillo 18', 66'	Report	da Silva 20', 64'; Artiaga 69'	Referee: Carlos Ulloa, Chile

== Peru national under-15 football team ==
=== South American U-15 Championship ===
First round

18 November 2013	Paraguay	1–2	Peru	Estadio IV Centenario, Tarija
14:00	Frachi 74'	Report	Mendieta 20'; Guivin 68'	Referee: Eduardo Gamboa (Chile)

20 November 2013	Bolivia	0–3	Peru	Estadio IV Centenario, Tarija
16:00		Report	Iberico 42', 53'; Mendieta 65'	Referee: Jesús Valenzuela (Venezuela)

22 November 2013	Ecuador	0–2	Peru	Estadio IV Centenario, Tarija
14:00		Report	Iberico 8'; Canela 27'	Referee: Wilson Lamouroux (Colombia)

24 November 2013	Argentina	4–4	Peru	Estadio IV Centenario, Tarija
14:00	Conechny 6', 14'; Roskopf 70'; Ramos 78'	Report	Arakaki 11', 32'; Iberico 17', 88'	Referee: Eduardo Gamboa (Chile)

Semi-finals

28 November 2013	Peru	2–0	Chile	Estadio Ramón Aguilera, Santa Cruz
20:00	Iberico 11'; Arakaki 64'	Report		Referee: Mario Diaz de Vivar (Paraguay)

Final

30 November 2013	Peru	1–0	Colombia	Estadio Ramón Aguilera, Santa Cruz
20:00	Iberico 83'	Report		Referee: Wilton Sampaio (Brazil)

== Peruvian clubs in international competitions ==
Team	2013 Copa Libertadores	2013 Copa Sudamericana
Sporting Cristal	Second stage	N/A
Real Garcilaso	Quarterfinals	N/A
Universidad César Vallejo	First stage	N/A
Juan Aurich	N/A	First stage
Melgar	N/A	First stage
Sport Huancayo	N/A	First stage
Inti Gas	N/A	First stage

== Torneo Descentralizado ==
=== First stage ===
Pos	Team	Pld	W	D	L	GF	GA	GD	Pts	Second Stage placement
1	Real Garcilaso	30	17	7	6	40	20	+20	57 (Note: Real Garcilaso was docked 1 point and penalized with 3 goals against.)	Liguilla A
2	Universitario	30	15	8	7	41	24	+17	53	Liguilla B
3	Sporting Cristal	30	14	7	9	51	33	+18	49	Liguilla A
4	UTC	30	13	8	9	33	27	+6	47	Liguilla B
5	Universidad César Vallejo	30	12	10	8	35	32	+3	46	Liguilla A
6	León de Huánuco	30	11	12	7	37	27	+10	45	Liguilla B
7	Alianza Lima	30	13	6	11	34	33	+1	45	Liguilla A
8	Inti Gas	30	11	10	9	41	38	+3	43	Liguilla B
9	Sport Huancayo	30	11	9	10	40	41	−1	42	Liguilla A
10	Cienciano	30	10	9	11	30	39	−9	39	Liguilla B
11	Melgar	30	8	12	10	32	33	−1	36	Liguilla A
12	Juan Aurich	30	8	9	13	37	37	0	33	Liguilla B
13	Pacífico	30	7	12	11	22	32	−10	33	Liguilla A
14	Universidad San Martín	30	8	6	16	26	44	−18	30	Liguilla B
15	Unión Comercio	30	6	8	16	24	40	−16	26	Liguilla A
16	José Gálvez	30	6	7	17	39	65	−26	25	Liguilla B

Updated to match(es) played on June 24, 2013. Source: ADFP - official site
Rules for classification: 1) points; 2) goal difference; 3) number of goals scored; 4) head-to-head record

=== Second stage ===
Liguilla A

Pos	Team	Pld	W	D	L	GF	GA	GD	Pts	Qualification or relegation
1	Real Garcilaso	44	22	12	10	63	39	+24	77 (Note: Real Garcilaso was docked 1 point and penalized with 3 goals against.)	Third Stage and the 2014 Copa Libertadores Second Stage
2	Sporting Cristal	44	22	9	13	76	45	+31	75	
3	Alianza Lima	44	19	12	13	57	46	+11	70 (Note: Alianza Lima was awarded 1 point 2012 Torneo de Promoción y Reserva runner-up.)	
4	Universidad César Vallejo	44	18	15	11	56	46	+10	69	
5	Sport Huancayo	44	14	14	16	55	62	−7	56	
6	Melgar	44	10	20	14	45	49	−4	50	
7	Unión Comercio	44	11	11	22	39	59	−20	44	
8	Pacífico	44	10	14	20	31	62	−31	44	

Updated to match(es) played on November 2013. Source: ADFP.org.pe
Rules for classification: 1) points; 2) goal difference; 3) number of goals scored.
Notes:

Liguilla B

Pos	Team	Pld	W	D	L	GF	GA	GD	Pts	Qualification or relegation
1	Universitario	44	21	13	10	59	37	+22	76	Third Stage and the 2014 Copa Libertadores Second Stage
2	UTC	44	19	11	14	54	51	+3	68	
3	Inti Gas	44	17	12	15	63	65	−2	63	
4	Juan Aurich	44	17	11	16	66	50	+16	62	
5	Cienciano	44	15	14	15	46	56	−10	59	
6	León de Huánuco	44	14	14	16	49	48	+1	56	
7	Universidad San Martín	44	12	11	21	46	60	−14	49 (Note: Universidad San Martín was awarded 2 points as 2012 Torneo de Promoción y Reserva champion.)	
8	José Gálvez	44	10	9	25	55	88	−33	39	

Updated to match(es) played on November 2013. Source: ADFP.org.pe
Rules for classification: 1) points; 2) goal difference; 3) number of goals scored.

=== Play-offs ===
December 8, 2013
13:00
First leg

Real Garcilaso	3–2	Universitario
Ortiz 2'; Ferreira 45+1'; Ramúa 88'	Report	Ruidíaz 67' (pen.); Fernández 78'

Estadio Municipal de Espinar, Yauri
Attendance: 6,544
Referee: Manuel Garay

December 15, 2013
15:30
Second leg

Universitario	3–0	Real Garcilaso
Guastavino 7'; Fernández 16'; Guarderas 85'	Report

Estadio Monumental, Lima
Attendance: 46,824
Referee: Víctor Hugo Carrillo

December 18, 2013
13:00
Third leg

Real Garcilaso	1–1 (a.e.t.)	Universitario
Bogado 64'	Report	Galliquio 52'
Penalties
Ramúa (penalty scored); Ortiz (penalty scored); Ramos (penalty missed); Guadalupe (penalty scored); Ferreira (penalty scored); Rey (penalty missed); Retamoso (penalty missed)	4–5	(penalty missed) Ximénez; (penalty scored) Gonzáles; (penalty scored) Gómez; (penalty scored) Gustavino; (penalty scored) Ruidíaz; (penalty missed) Romero; (penalty scored) Duarte

Estadio Huancayo, Huancayo
Attendance: 15,200
Referee: Henry Gambetta

Universitario won the cup after defeating Real Garcilaso.

== Segunda División ==
=== League table ===
Pos	Team	Pld	W	D	L	GF	GA	GD	Pts	Promotion or relegation
1	Los Caimanes	26	14	10	2	50	28	+22	52	2014 Torneo Descentralizado
2	Alfonso Ugarte	26	15	4	7	45	18	+27	49	
3	Atlético Torino	26	14	4	8	44	30	+14	46	
4	Deportivo Coopsol	26	10	10	6	40	31	+9	40	
5	Alianza Universidad	26	10	10	6	52	45	+7	40	
6	Defensor San Alejandro	26	11	6	9	42	36	+6	39	
7	Sport Boys	26	12	7	7	35	34	+1	39 (Note: Sport Boys was docked a total of 4 points for outstanding debts with the SAFAP.)	
8	Walter Ormeño	26	10	8	8	31	25	+6	38	
9	Sportivo Huracán	26	7	15	4	33	26	+7	36	
10	Sport Victoria	26	10	4	12	27	32	−5	34	
11	Deportivo Municipal	26	8	6	12	31	32	−1	30	
12	Atlético Minero	26	7	7	12	22	27	−5	28	
13	Sport Áncash (D)	26	3	5	18	18	62	−44	10 (Note: Sport Ancash was docked a total of 4 points for outstanding debts with the SAFAP and was disabled and relegated to the Copa Perú.)	2014 Copa Perú
14	Alianza Cristiana (D)	26	1	2	23	8	68	−60	1 (Note: Alianza Cristiana was docked a total of 4 points for outstanding debts with the SAFAP and was disabled and relegated to the Copa Perú.)	2014 Copa Perú

Updated to match(es) played on September 2013. Source: http://www.adfp-sd.com/index.php/estadisticas.html?func=showResultsRank&p=4
Rules for classification: 1) points; 2) goal difference; 3) number of goals scored.
(D) Disqualified
