= 2013 South American U-15 Championship =

Campeonato Sudamericano Sub-15 Bolivia 2013

Tournament details
- Host country: Bolivia
- Dates: 16–30 November
- Teams: 10 (from 1 confederation)
- Venue: 3 (in 3 host cities)

Final positions
- Champions: Peru (1st title)
- Runners-up: Colombia
- Third place: Argentina
- Fourth place: Chile

Tournament statistics
- Matches played: 24
- Goals scored: 72 (3 per match)
- Top scorer: (Peru) Luis Iberico (7 goals)

The 2013 South American U-15 Championship (Spanish: Campeonato Sudamericano Sub-15 Bolivia 2013) was the 6th edition of the South American U-15 Championship, the biennial international youth football championship organised by CONMEBOL for the men's under-15 national teams of South America. It was held in Bolivia from 16 to 30 November 2023.

The tournament acted as South American qualifying for the 2014 Summer Youth Olympics. The champion team qualified for the 2014 Summer Youth Olympics boys' football tournament in Nanjing, China as the CONMEBOL representative.

Brazil were the defending champions, but they failed to defend the title after being eliminated in the group stage.

Peru won their first South American U-15 title by defeating Colombia 1–0 in the final, and qualified for the 2014 Summer Youth Olympics boys' football tournament. Argentina finished in third place after beating Chile in the third-place play-off.

== Teams ==
All ten CONMEBOL member national teams entered the tournament.

| Team | Appearance | Previous best top-4 performance |
|---|---|---|
| Argentina | 6th | Runners-up (2005) |
| Bolivia (hosts) | 6th | Fourth place (2005) |
| Brazil (holders) | 6th | Champions (2005, 2007, 2011) |
| Chile | 6th | Fourth place (2007) |
| Colombia | 6th | Runners-up (2004, 2011) |
| Ecuador | 6th | Third place (2009) |
| Paraguay | 6th | Champions (2004, 2009) |
| Peru | 6th | None |
| Uruguay | 6th | Runners-up (2007) |
| Venezuela | 6th | None |

=== Squads ===
Each team was required to register a squad of 22 players, three of whom had to be goalkeepers (Regulations Article 6.2). Players born on or after 1 January 1998 were eligible to compete in the tournament (Regulations Article 6.7).

== Venues ==
| Montero | Location of host cities. |
|---|---|
| Estadio Gilberto Parada | Location of host cities. |
| Capacity: 15,000 | Location of host cities. |
| Santa Cruz | Location of host cities. |
| Estadio Ramón Aguilera | Location of host cities. |
| Capacity: 42,000 | Location of host cities. |
| Tarija | Location of host cities. |
| Estadio IV Centenario | Location of host cities. |
| Capacity: 15,000 | Location of host cities. |

Bolivia was named host country of the tournament during the CONMEBOL Executive Committee meeting held on 20 December 2012 at CONMEBOL headquarters in Luque, Paraguay. It was the third time that Bolivia hosted the tournament, having previously done so in 2005 and 2009.

Four cities were candidates to host the competition: Santa Cruz, Cochabamba, Tarija and Sucre. In May 2013, Santa Cruz and Tarija were announced as the host cities, and Montero was added as an extra venue days before the start of the tournament.

== Draw ==
The draw for the groups composition was held on 20 September 2023, 10:00 BOT (UTC−4), at the Liga del Fútbol Profesional Boliviano headquarters in Santa Cruz. The hosts Bolivia and defending champions Brazil were seeded into Group A and Group B, respectively, and assigned to position 1 in their group, while the remaining eight teams were drawn to one of the two groups.

The draw event was hosted by the president of the Bolivian Football Federation Carlos Chávez and was attended by CONMEBOL president Eugenio Figueredo. After the draw, the groups were formed as follows:

Group A
| Pos | Team |
|---|---|
| A1 | Bolivia |
| A2 | Argentina |
| A3 | Paraguay |
| A4 | Ecuador |
| A5 | Peru |

Group B
| Pos | Team |
|---|---|
| B1 | Brazil |
| B2 | Venezuela |
| B3 | Uruguay |
| B4 | Colombia |
| B5 | Chile |

== Match officials ==
On 23 October 2013, CONMEBOL announced the match officials appointed for the tournament, being selected one referee and one assistant referee from each member association.

| Association | Referees | Assistant referees |
|---|---|---|
| Argentina | Pablo Díaz | Ezequiel Brailovsky |
| Bolivia | Gery Vargas | Javier Bustillos |
| Brazil | Wilton Sampaio | Kleber Lucio Gill |
| Chile | Roberto Tobar | Raúl Orellana |
| Colombia | Wilson Lamouroux | Cristian de La Cruz |
| Ecuador | Carlos Orbe | Edwin Bravo |
| Paraguay | Mario Díaz de Vivar | Eduardo Cardozo |
| Peru | Miguel Santivañez | Víctor Ráez |
| Uruguay | Andrés Cunha | Carlos Changala |
| Venezuela | Jesús Valenzuela | Tulio Moreno |

== First stage ==
The top two teams in each group advanced to the final stage.

If teams finish level on points, order will be determined according to the following criteria:

1. superior goal difference in all matches
2. greater number of goals scored in all group matches
3. better result in matches between tied teams
4. drawing of lots

All kick-off times are local, BOT (UTC−4), as listed by CONMEBOL.

=== Group A ===
| Team | Pld | W | D | L | GF | GA | GD | Pts |
|---|---|---|---|---|---|---|---|---|
| Peru | 4 | 3 | 1 | 0 | 11 | 5 | +6 | 10 |
| Argentina | 4 | 3 | 1 | 0 | 11 | 7 | +4 | 10 |
| Paraguay | 4 | 1 | 1 | 2 | 6 | 6 | 0 | 4 |
| Ecuador | 4 | 1 | 1 | 2 | 5 | 6 | −1 | 4 |
| Bolivia | 4 | 0 | 0 | 4 | 11 | 2 | −9 | 0 |

16 November 2013
14:00

| Argentina | 2–1 | Ecuador |
|---|---|---|
| Vietto 7', 90+1' | Report | Vivero 28' |

Estadio IV Centenario, Tarija
Referee: Wilson Lamouroux (Colombia)

16 November 2013
16:00

| Bolivia | 0–3 | Paraguay |
|---|---|---|
| | Report | Aranda 65'; Colmán 67'; Díaz 68' |

Estadio IV Centenario, Tarija
Referee: Andrés Cunha (Uruguay)

18 November 2013
14:00

| Paraguay | 1–2 | Peru |
|---|---|---|
| Frachi 74' | Report | Mendieta 20'; Guivin 68' |

Estadio IV Centenario, Tarija
Referee: Eduardo Gamboa (Chile)

18 November 2013
16:00

| Bolivia | 1–2 | Argentina |
|---|---|---|
| Miranda 72' | Report | Fernández 4'; Pardo 13' |

Estadio IV Centenario, Tarija
Referee: Wilton Sampaio (Brazil)

20 November 2013
14:00

| Paraguay | 1–1 | Ecuador |
|---|---|---|
| Villaba 21' | Report | Montaño 55' |

Estadio IV Centenario, Tarija
Referee: Andrés Cunha (Uruguay)

20 November 2013
16:00

| Bolivia | 0–3 | Peru |
|---|---|---|
| | Report | Iberico 42', 53'; Mendieta 65' |

Estadio IV Centenario, Tarija
Referee: Jesús Valenzuela (Venezuela)

22 November 2013
14:00

| Ecuador | 0–2 | Peru |
|---|---|---|
| | Report | Iberico 8'; Canela 27' |

Estadio IV Centenario, Tarija
Referee: Wilson Lamouroux (Colombia)

22 November 2013
16:00

| Argentina | 3–1 | Paraguay |
|---|---|---|
| Roskopf 39', 90+2'; Vietto 27' | Report | Villalba 51' |

Estadio IV Centenario, Tarija
Referee: Wilton Sampaio (Brazil)

24 November 2013
14:00

| Argentina | 4–4 | Peru |
|---|---|---|
| Conechny 6', 14'; Roskopf 70'; Ramos 78' | Report | Arakaki 11', 32'; Iberico 17', 88' |

Estadio IV Centenario, Tarija
Referee: Eduardo Gamboa (Chile)

24 November 2013
16:00

| Bolivia | 1–3 | Ecuador |
|---|---|---|
| Miranda 53' | Report | Vivero 30'; Jaramillo 65'; Tello 90+2' |

Estadio IV Centenario, Tarija
Referee: Jesús Valenzuela (Venezuela)

=== Group B ===
| Team | Pld | W | D | L | GF | GA | GD | Pts |
|---|---|---|---|---|---|---|---|---|
| Colombia | 4 | 3 | 1 | 0 | 9 | 3 | +6 | 10 |
| Chile | 4 | 2 | 1 | 1 | 6 | 5 | +1 | 7 |
| Brazil | 4 | 1 | 2 | 1 | 4 | 2 | +2 | 5 |
| Uruguay | 4 | 1 | 2 | 1 | 6 | 5 | +1 | 5 |
| Venezuela | 4 | 0 | 0 | 4 | 4 | 14 | −10 | 0 |

17 November 2013
14:00

| Venezuela | 2–4 | Colombia |
|---|---|---|
| Trujillo 70'; Herrera 80' | Report | Cetré 13', 67'; Bolaños 25', 68' |

Estadio Gilberto Parada, Montero
Referee: Gery Vargas (Bolivia)

17 November 2013
16:00

| Brazil | 0–0 | Uruguay |
|---|---|---|
| | Report |

Estadio Gilberto Parada, Montero
Referee: Pablo Díaz (Argentina)

19 November 2013
18:00

| Uruguay | 2–2 | Chile |
|---|---|---|
| Rossi 2', 38' | Report | Pinto 9'; Álvarez 22' |

Estadio Ramón Aguilera, Santa Cruz
Referee: Miguel Santivañez (Peru)

19 November 2013
20:00

| Brazil | 3–0 | Venezuela |
|---|---|---|
| Evander 18', 31', 33' | Report |

Estadio Ramón Aguilera, Santa Cruz
Referee: Carlos Orbe (Ecuador)

21 November 2013
18:00

| Uruguay | 0–1 | Colombia |
|---|---|---|
| | Report | Bolaños 90+1' |

Estadio Ramón Aguilera, Santa Cruz
Referee: Pablo Díaz (Argentina)

21 November 2013
20:00

| Brazil | 0–1 | Chile |
|---|---|---|
| | Report | Pinto 63' |

Estadio Ramón Aguilera, Santa Cruz
Referee: Mario Díaz de Vivar (Paraguay)

23 November 2013
14:00

| Colombia | 3–0 | Chile |
|---|---|---|
| Bolaños 33'; Mosquera 70'; Cuéllar 90+1' | Report |

Estadio Ramón Aguilera, Santa Cruz
Referee: Carlos Orbe(Ecuador)

23 November 2013
16:00

| Venezuela | 2–4 | Uruguay |
|---|---|---|
| Farisato 15'; Herrera 79' | Report | Ramírez 20', 90+4'; Rossi 84'; Valverde 90+2' |

Estadio Ramón Aguilera, Santa Cruz
Referee: Gery Vargas (Bolivia)

25 November 2013
18:00

| Venezuela | 0–3 | Chile |
|---|---|---|
| | Report | Reyes 11'; Salas 21'; Fernandois 35' |

Estadio Gilberto Parada, Montero
Referee: Miguel Santivañez (Peru)

25 November 2013
20:00

| Brazil | 1–1 | Colombia |
|---|---|---|
| Miullen 69' | Report | Mosquera 24' |

Estadio Gilberto Parada, Montero
Referee: Pablo Díaz (Argentina)

== Final stage ==
In the final stage, if a match was tied after regular time (90 minutes), extra time would not be played and the match would be directly decided by a penalty shoot-out.

Semi-finals
28 November - Santa Cruz
Peru | 2
Chile | 0
28 November - Santa Cruz
Colombia | 2
Argentina | 0

Final
30 November - Santa Cruz
Peru | 1
Colombia | 0
Third place
30 November - Santa Cruz
Chile | 1
Argentina | 2

=== Semi-finals ===
28 November 2013
18:00

| Colombia | 2–0 | Argentina |
|---|---|---|
| Bolaños 9'; Lucumí 54' | Report |

Estadio Ramón Aguilera, Santa Cruz
Referee: Carlos Orbe (Ecuador)

28 November 2013
20:00

| Peru | 2–0 | Chile |
|---|---|---|
| Iberico 11'; Arakaki 64' | Report |

Estadio Ramón Aguilera, Santa Cruz
Referee: Mario Diaz de Vivar (Paraguay)

=== Third place ===
30 November 2013
18:00

| Chile | 1–2 | Argentina |
|---|---|---|
| Álvarez 41' | Report | Vietto 5'; Roskopf 37' |

Estadio Ramón Aguilera, Santa Cruz
Referee: Gery Vargas (Bolivia)

=== Final ===
30 November 2013
20:00

| Peru | 1–0 | Colombia |
|---|---|---|
| Iberico 83' | Report |

Estadio Ramón Aguilera, Santa Cruz
Referee: Wilton Sampaio (Brazil)

2013 South American Under-15 Football champions

Peru
First title

== Goalscorers ==
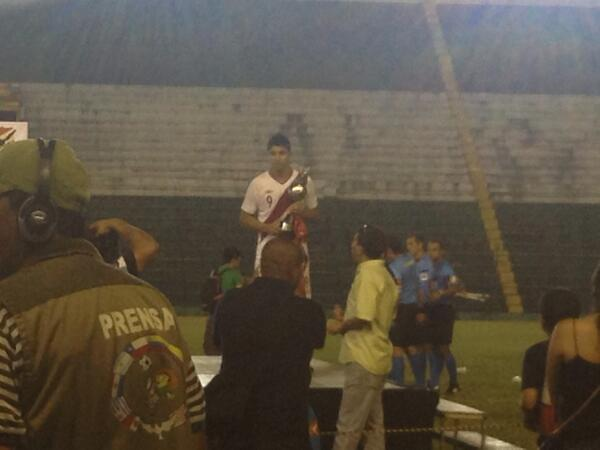
Peru's forward Luis Iberico receiving the top scorer award.

There were 72 goals scored in 24 matches, for an average of 3 goals per match.

7 goals

- (Peru) Luis Iberico

5 goals

- (Colombia) Edward Bolaños

4 goals

- (Argentina) Matías Roskopf
- (Argentina) Federico Vietto

3 goals

- (Brazil) Evander
- (Uruguay) Diego Rossi
- (Peru) Hideyoshi Arakaki

2 goals

- (Argentina) Tomás Conechny
- (Bolivia) Bruno Miranda
- (Chile) Ricardo Álvarez
- (Chile) Mathías Pinto
- (Colombia) Edwuin Cetré
- (Colombia) Andrés Mosquera
- (Ecuador) Edgar Vivero
- (Paraguay) Julio Villalba
- (Uruguay) Santiago Ramírez
- (Peru) Jesús Mendieta
- (Venezuela) Yangel Herrera

1 goal

- (Argentina) Bruno Fernández
- (Argentina) Facundo Pardo
- (Argentina) Franco Ramos
- (Brazil) Miullen
- (Chile) Paul Fermandois
- (Chile) Manuel Reyes
- (Chile) Luis Salas
- (Colombia) Jonathan Cuéllar
- (Colombia) Jhon Lucumí
- (Ecuador) Renny Jaramillo
- (Ecuador) Johao Montaño
- (Ecuador) Estefano Tello
- (Paraguay) Arturo Aranda
- (Paraguay) Josué Colmán
- (Paraguay) Sergio Díaz
- (Paraguay) Guillermo Frachi
- (Peru) Jeremy Canela
- (Peru) Jordan Guivin
- (Uruguay) Federico Valverde
- (Venezuela) Marco Farisato
- (Venezuela) Anthony Trujillo
