= Football at the 2014 South American Games =

2014 South American Games football tournament
Tournament details
- City: Santiago, Chile
- Dates: 9 March 2014– 17 March 2014
- Teams: 6 (men's); 7 (women's) (from 1 confederation)
- Venue: 1 (in 1 host city)

Final positions
- Champions: Colombia (men's); Argentina (women's)
- Runners-up: Argentina (men's); Chile (women's)
- Third place: Ecuador (men's); Brazil (women's)
- Fourth place: Chile (men's); Venezuela (women's)

The association football tournament at the 2014 South American Games was held from 7 March to 18 March in Santiago, Chile.

== Medal summary ==
Event	Gold	Silver	Bronze
Men	Colombia	Argentina	Ecuador
Women	Argentina	Chile	Brazil

=== Medal table ===
Rank	Nation	Gold	Silver	Bronze	Total
1	Argentina (ARG)	1	1	0	2
2	Colombia (COL)	1	0	0	1
3	Chile (CHI)	0	1	0	1
4	Brazil (BRA)	0	0	1	1
4	Ecuador (ECU)	0	0	1	1
Totals (5 entries)		2	2	2	6

== Men's football ==
=== Group A ===
Team	Pld	W	D	L	GF	GA	GD	Pts
Chile	2	1	1	0	5	4	+1	4
Ecuador	2	1	0	1	3	3	0	3
Paraguay	2	0	1	1	4	5	−1	1

9 March 2014 Group stage	Ecuador	2–1	Paraguay	Santiago, Chile
18:00 CLST (UTC−03:00)	Tello 55'; Casquete 57'	Report	Carlos Ferreira 75'	Stadium: Estadio Bicentenario de La Florida

11 March 2014 Group stage	Chile	2–1	Ecuador	Santiago, Chile
10:00 CLST (UTC−03:00)	René Meléndez 49'; Mathías Pinto 72'	Report	Joel Quinteros 52'	Stadium: Estadio Bicentenario de La Florida

13 March 2014 Group stage	Chile	3–3	Paraguay	Santiago, Chile
	(unknown) 4' (o.g.); Mathías Pinto 45', 50'	Report	David Josué 11'; Villalba 44' (unknown) 67'	Stadium: Estadio Bicentenario de La Florida; Referee: Pablo Díaz (Argentina)

=== Group B ===
Team	Pld	W	D	L	GF	GA	GD	Pts
Argentina	2	2	0	0	7	3	+4	6
Colombia	2	1	0	1	5	3	+2	3
Peru	2	0	0	2	3	9	−6	0

9 March 2014 Group stage	Colombia	4–1	Peru	Santiago, Chile
20:00	John Monsalve 31'; Edward Angulo 38', 43', 45+2' (pen.)	[ Report]	Luis Iberico 51'	Stadium: Estadio Bicentenario de La Florida

11 March 2014 Group stage	Peru	2–5	Argentina	Santiago, Chile
18:00	Jesús Mendieta 53'; Luis Iberico 65' (pen.)	[ Report]	Lucas Ferraz 6'; Federico Vietto 27', 40'; Matías Roskope 31'; Tomás Conechny 44'	Stadium: Estadio Bicentenario de La Florida

13 March 2014 Group stage	Colombia	1–2	Argentina	Santiago, Chile
18:00	Edward Bolaños 88'		Tomás Conechny 83'; Matías Roskopf 86'	Stadium: Estadio Bicentenario de La Florida

=== Semi-finals ===
15 March 2014 Semi-finals	Argentina	1–0	Ecuador	Santiago, Chile
				Stadium: Estadio Bicentenario de La Florida

15 March 2014 Semi-finals	Chile	2–3	Colombia	Santiago, Chile
20:00 CLST (UTC−03:00)	Felipe Molina 37'; Kevin Madariaga	Report	(unknown) 61'; Jefferson Valdeblánquez 66' (unknown) 86'	Stadium: Estadio Bicentenario de La Florida; Referee: Ulises Mereles (Paraguay)

=== Bronze-medal match ===
17 March 2014 Group stage	Chile	1–2	Ecuador	Santiago, Chile
	Alonso Rodríguez 71'	Report	John Pereira 47'; Renny Jaramillo 85'	Stadium: Estadio Bicentenario de La Florida

=== Gold-medal match ===
17 March 2014 Group stage	Argentina	1–2	Colombia	Santiago, Chile
				Stadium: Estadio Bicentenario de La Florida

== Women's football ==
=== Group A ===
Team	Pld	W	D	L	GF	GA	GD	Pts
Chile	2	2	0	0	3	0	+3	6
Argentina	2	1	0	1	4	1	+3	3
Bolivia	2	0	0	2	0	6	−6	0

9 March 2014 Group stage	Chile	1–0	Argentina	Santiago, Chile
	Moroso 26'	[ Report]		Stadium: Estadio Bicentenario de La Florida

10 March 2014 Group stage	Argentina	4–0	Bolivia	Santiago, Chile
	Quiñones 10'; Larroquette 37'; Banini 57'; Pereyra 86'	[ Report]		Stadium: Estadio Bicentenario de La Florida

12 March 2014 Group stage	Chile	2–0	Bolivia	Santiago, Chile
	Bárbara Muñoz 16'; Araya 84'	[ Report]		Stadium: Estadio Bicentenario de La Florida

=== Group B ===
Team	Pld	W	D	L	GF	GA	GD	Pts
Brazil	3	2	1	0	7	1	+6	7
Venezuela	3	2	0	1	5	5	+0	6
Colombia	3	1	0	2	3	3	+0	3
Uruguay	3	0	1	2	0	6	−6	1

8 March 2014 Group stage	Colombia	0–1	Venezuela	Santiago, Chile
		[ Report]	Zambrano 16'	Stadium: Estadio Bicentenario de La Florida

8 March 2014 Group stage	Brazil	0–0	Uruguay	Santiago, Chile
		[ Report]		Stadium: Estadio Bicentenario de La Florida

10 March 2014 Group stage	Colombia	2–0	Uruguay	Santiago, Chile
	Santos 70'; Ospina 88'	[ Report]		Stadium: Estadio Bicentenario de La Florida

10 March 2014 Group stage	Brazil	5–0	Venezuela	Santiago, Chile
	Cristiane 15', ?'; Darlene 26'; Bruna 30'; Poliana 40'	[ Report]		Stadium: Estadio Bicentenario de La Florida

11 March 2014 Group stage	Venezuela	4–0	Uruguay	Santiago, Chile
	Ascanio 10', 31'; Viso 60'; Oliveros 90+1'	[ Report]		Stadium: Estadio Bicentenario de La Florida

12 March 2014 Group stage	Brazil	2–1	Colombia	Santiago, Chile
	Rafinha 29'; Bruna 47'	[ Report]	Pineda 66'	Stadium: Estadio Bicentenario de La Florida

=== Semi-finals ===
14 March 2014 Semi-finals	Brazil	0–0 (3–5 p)	Argentina	Santiago, Chile
18:00		Report		Stadium: Estadio Bicentenario de La Florida
	Penalties
	Cristiane (penalty missed); Bia (penalty scored); Tamires (penalty scored); Poliana (penalty scored)		(penalty scored) Vallejos; (penalty scored) Larroquette; (penalty scored) Banini; (penalty scored) Espíndola; (penalty scored) Pereyra

14 March 2014 Semi-finals	Chile	0–0 (3–1 p)	Venezuela	Santiago, Chile
20:00		Report		Stadium: Estadio Bicentenario de La Florida
	Penalties
	Rothfeld (penalty scored); Pinilla (penalty scored); Aedo (penalty missed); Guerrero (penalty scored)		(penalty missed) Rangel; (penalty scored) Viso; (penalty missed) Gallardo; (penalty missed) Ulacio

=== Bronze-medal match ===
16 March 2014 Group stage	Brazil	2–0	Venezuela	Santiago, Chile
	Bruna; Poliana			Stadium: Estadio Bicentenario de La Florida

=== Gold-medal match ===
16 March 2014 Gold-medal match	Argentina	2–1	Chile	Santiago, Chile
20:00 CLST (UTC-03:00)	Banini 45'; Oviedo 67'	Report	Araya 57'	Stadium: Estadio Bicentenario de La Florida; Attendance: 12,000; Referee: Zulma Quiñónez (Paraguay)
