= Jherson Reyes =

Peruvian footballer

Personal information
- Full name: Jherson Joao Aldair Reyes Rossi
- Date of birth: 26 August 2004 (age 22)
- Place of birth: Lima, Peru
- Height: 1.79 m (5 ft 10 in)
- Position: Right-back

Team information
- Current team: Atlético Grau
- Number: 17

Youth career
- 2015–2018: Alianza Lima
- 2018: Héctor Chumpitaz
- 2019–2021: Academia Cantolao
- 2022: Deportes La Serena

Senior career*
Years	Team	Apps	(Gls)
2021–2022	Academia Cantolao	3	(0)
2023	Deportes La Serena	14	(0)
2024–	Atlético Grau	27	(1)

International career
- Peru U15
2020–2021	Peru U17		
2021–2022	Peru U20		
- * Club domestic league appearances and goals as of 29 December 2025

Jherson Joao Aldair Reyes Rossi (born 26 August 2004) is a Peruvian footballer who plays as a right-back for Peruvian Primera División club Atlético Grau.

== Club career ==
A right-back, Reyes was with Alianza Lima and Club Deportivo Héctor Chumpitaz before joining the Academia Cantolao youth ranks. He made his professional debut in 2021.

In 2022, Reyes moved to Chile and signed with Deportes La Serena. He made his debut in Chile in the 3–1 win against Santiago Wanderers on 19 February 2023.

Back to Peru, Reyes joined Atlético Grau in the top division in January 2024. He renewed with them for the 2025 season and took part in the 2025 Copa Sudamericana.

== International career ==
Reyes has represented Peru at under-15, under-17 and under-20 levels. He also served as a sparring for the Peru senior team.
