= Ricardo Álvarez =

Ricardo Álvarez may refer to:

== Footballers ==
- Ricardo Álvarez (footballer, born 1897) (1897–1955), Spanish winger
- Ricardo Álvarez (Mexican footballer) (1911–1986), Mexican forward
- Ricardo Álvarez (footballer, born 1957), Spanish midfielder
- Richy (footballer) (Ricardo Álvarez Puig, born 1984), Spanish centre-back
- Ricky Álvarez (born 1988), Argentine attacking midfielder
- Ricardo Álvarez (Chilean footballer) (born 1999), Chilean midfielder

== Others ==
- Ricardo Álvarez-Rivón (born c. 1950), Puerto Rican comic artist
- Ricardo Álvarez Arias (born 1963), Honduran vice president
- Ricardo Álvarez (boxer) (Ricardo Álvarez Barragán, born 1981), Mexican boxer
