= Jordan Guivin =

Peruvian footballer (born 1998)

Personal information
- Full name: Jordan Marcelo Guivin Tanta
- Date of birth: 23 February 1998 (age 28)
- Place of birth: Lima, Peru
- Height: 1.70 m (5 ft 7 in)
- Position: Midfielder

Team information
- Current team: Universitario de Deportes
- Number: 21

Youth career
- 2012–2016: Universidad de San Martín

Senior career*
Years	Team	Apps	(Gls)
2017–2020	Universidad de San Martín	109	(11)
2021	Cienciano	25	(2)
2022–2023	Celaya F.C.	17	(1)
2022–2023	→ Universitario de Deportes (loan)	22	(2)
2023	→ Cusco FC (loan)	16	(0)
2024	Cienciano	20	(0)
2025	Los Chankas	33	(1)
2026	Asociación Deportiva Tarma	16	(5)
2026-	Universitario de Deportes	0	(0)

International career
2013	Peru U15	6	(1)
2014	Peru U17	3	(0)
2019–2020	Peru U23	4	(1)
- * Club domestic league appearances and goals as of 30 December 2025

Jordan Marcelo Guivin Tanta (born 23 February 1998) is a Peruvian footballer who plays as a midfielder for Peruvian Liga 1 club Universitario de Deportes.

== Club career ==
Guivin came from the youth ranks of Universidad de San Martín. In 2017, he was promoted to the first team and made his professional debut in a 0–3 away loss against Ayacucho FC, coming from the bench. The next season, Guivin gained prominence with San Martín, playing 39 matches and scoring 2 goals, with his first professional goal happening in a 1–2 away victory against Comerciantes Unidos. He was signed by Cienciano for the 2021 season, in which the club qualified to the 2022 Copa Sudamericana.

== International career ==
Guivin began playing for Peru at the U15 level, being a key player in the 2013 South American U-15 Championship won by Peru, the only time the country has come in first place, with him scoring in the group stage against Paraguay and assisting Luis Iberico's winning goal against Colombia in the final. Guivin was later called at the U17 level for the 2014 South American Games and at the U23 level for the 2019 Pan American Games, where he scored in a 2–2 tie against Honduras, and for the 2020 CONMEBOL Pre-Olympic Tournament, where he did not play in any match.

== Career statistics ==
=== Club ===
As of 10 November 2022

Club	Division	League			Cup		Continental		Total	
Club	Division	Season	Apps	Goals	Apps	Goals	Apps	Goals	Apps	Goals
Universidad de San Martín	Peruvian Torneo Descentralizado	2017	14	0	—		—		14	0
Universidad de San Martín	Peruvian Torneo Descentralizado	2018	39	2	—		—		39	2
Universidad de San Martín	Peruvian Liga 1	2019	31	2	4	0	—		35	2
Universidad de San Martín	Peruvian Liga 1	2020	25	7	—		—		25	7
Universidad de San Martín	Total		109	11	4	0	0	0	113	11
Cienciano	Peruvian Liga 1	2021	25	2	1	0	—		26	2
Celaya F.C.	Liga Premier de México	2022	17	2	—		—		17	2
Universitario de Deportes	Peruvian Liga 1	2022	16	2	—		—		16	2
Universitario de Deportes	Peruvian Liga 1	2023	6	0	—		0	0	6	0
Universitario de Deportes	Total		22	2	0	0	0	0	22	2
Cusco FC	Peruvian Liga 1	2023	22	0	—		—		22	0
Career total			195	17	5	0	0	0	200	17
