= Bruna Benites =

Brazilian footballer (born 1985)

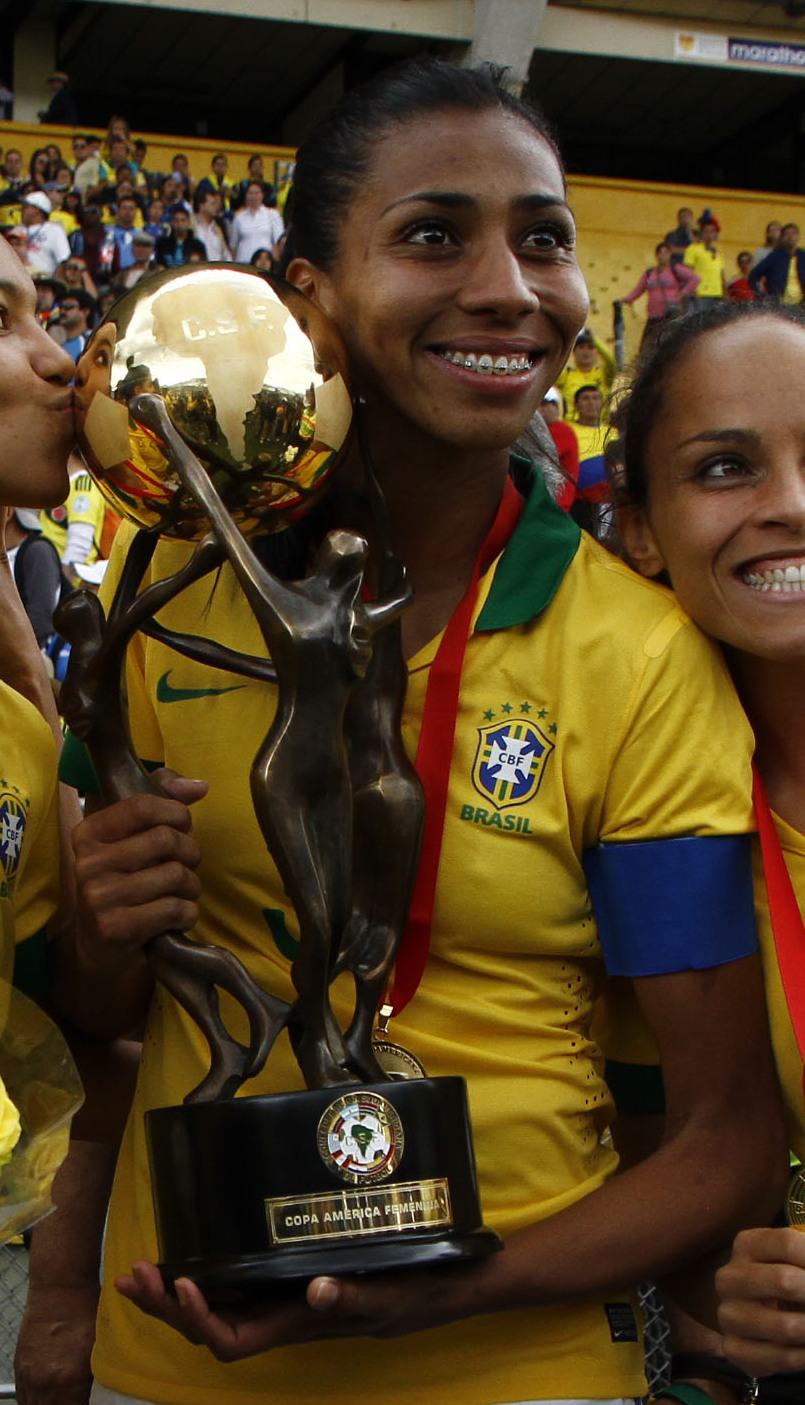
- Bruna Benites in 2014

Personal information
- Full name: Bruna Beatriz Benites Soares
- Date of birth: 16 October 1985 (age 41)
- Place of birth: Cuiabá, Mato Grosso, Brazil
- Height: 1.78 m (5 ft 10 in)
- Position: Defender

Team information
- Current team: Internacional
- Number: 3

Senior career*
Years	Team	Apps	(Gls)
–2010	Comercial		
2011–2012	Foz Cataratas		
2013–2016	São José	11	(3)
2016	Foz Cataratas Futebol Clube	6	(0)
2016	Avaldsnes	7	(1)
2017	Houston Dash	14	(0)
2017	Iranduba	0	(0)
2018	Guangdong Huijun	?	(?)
2019–	Internacional	72	(4)

International career
2012–2021	Brazil	77	(9)
- * Club domestic league appearances and goals as of 21:12, 17 November 2023 (UTC)

Bruna Beatriz Benites Soares (born 16 October 1985), commonly known as Bruna Benites or simply Bruna, is a Brazilian footballer who plays as a defender for Campeonato Brasileiro de Futebol Feminino Série A1 club Internacional.

== Club career ==
She played for Foz Cataratas and São José in Brazil.

In July 2016, she signed with Avaldsnes for one season.

On 30 November 2016 she signed with Houston Dash.

On 8 February 2018 she was waived by the Houston Dash.

== International career ==
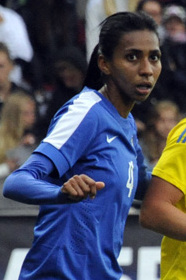
Bruna paying for the Brazil national team in 2013

Bruna made her debut at the 2012 Summer Olympics. She received a yellow card against Great Britain and in the Quarter Final defeat to Japan. In May 2015 national team captain Bruna suffered an anterior cruciate ligament injury, which caused her to miss the 2015 FIFA Women's World Cup.

=== International goals ===
No.	Date	Venue	Opponent	Score	Result	Competition
1.	10 March 2014	Estadio Bicentenario de La Florida, Santiago, Chile	Venezuela	3–0	5–0	2014 South America Games
2.	12 March 2014	Estadio Bicentenario de La Florida, Santiago, Chile	Colombia	2–0	2–1	2014 South America Games
3.	16 March 2014	Estadio Bicentenario de La Florida, Santiago, Chile	Venezuela	1–0	2–0	2014 South America Games
4.	9 March 2015	Stadium Bela Vista, Parchal, Portugal	Germany	1–1	1–3	2015 Algarve Cup
5.	9 April 2017	Arena da Amazônia, Manaus, Brazil	Bolivia	4–0	6–0	Friendly
6.	30 July 2017	Qualcomm Stadium, San Diego, United States	United States	2–1	3–4	2017 Tournament of Nations
7.	19 October 2017	Yongchuan Sports Center, Chongqing, China	Mexico	2–0	3–0	2017 Yongchuan International Tournament
8.	11 June 2021	Estadio Cartagonova, Cartagena, Spain	Russia	1–0	3–0	Friendly
9.	11 June 2021	Estadio Cartagonova, Cartagena, Spain	Russia	2–0	3–0	Friendly

== Personal life ==
She is a member of the Church of Jesus Christ of Latter-day Saints. She is also has a degree in Physiotherapy having studied at Universidade Catolica Dom Bosco in Campo Grande.
