= Vietto =

Vietto is a surname. Notable people with the surname include:

- Federico Vietto (born 1998), Argentine footballer
- Luciano Vietto (born 1993), Argentine footballer
- René Vietto (1914–1988), French cyclist
