= Hideyoshi Arakaki =

Peruvian footballer (born 1998)

Personal information
- Full name: Hideyoshi Enrique Arakaki Chinen
- Date of birth: 2 February 1998 (age 28)
- Place of birth: Lima, Peru
- Height: 1.65 m (5 ft 5 in)
- Position: Right winger

Team information
- Current team: Ayacucho
- Number: 88

Youth career
- –2016: Universidad San Martín

Senior career*
Years	Team	Apps	(Gls)
2016–2017	Universidad San Martín	40	(8)
2018–2020	Melgar	49	(4)
2021	Deportivo Municipal	18	(2)
2022	UTC	32	(12)
2023	Cusco FC	23	(1)
2024	Alianza Atlético	19	(0)
2025	César Vallejo	1	(0)
2025–	Ayacucho	16	(3)

International career
2013	Peru U15		(3)
2015	Peru U17	3	(0)
2016	Peru U20		(1)
2019	Peru U23	4	(0)
- * Club domestic league appearances and goals as of 30 December 2025

Hideyoshi Enrique Arakaki Chinen (born 2 February 1998) is a Peruvian professional footballer who plays as a right winger for Peruvian club Ayacucho.

== Club career ==
Arakaki excelled with Universidad San Martín during the 2015 Torneo de Promoción y Reserva, the national under-20 league, prompting his call-up to the first team by manager José del Solar the following year. He made his Peruvian Primera División debut on 10 February 2016, scoring the game-winner in the 47th minute of a 2–1 victory over Comerciantes Unidos.

Arakaki signed with FBC Melgar ahead of the 2018 season. He made his continental debut during the 2019 Copa Libertadores qualifying stages, scoring with an impressive strike from outside the box in their 2–0 home victory over Caracas FC on 19 February. In December 2019 he signed a one-year extension with the club.

On 8 December 2021, Arakaki signed with UTC. He later signed up for Cusco FC on 29 November 2022 for the 2023 Liga 1 where he would make around 23 appearances for the club. Alianza Atlético would later sign Arakaki for the 2024 Liga 1.

== International career ==
Arakaki has represented his country internationally at various age groups. He was part of the team that won the 2013 South American U-15 Championship for Peru, their first-ever title, while going undefeated in the tournament. He scored a brace in their 4–4 draw with Argentina and added another goal in their semi-final victory over Chile. He then played with the national under-17 team at the 2015 South American U-17 Championship before appearing with the Peru U20s at the 2016 Copa de los Andes as well as the Peru U23s during the 2019 Pan American Games in Lima.

== Personal life ==
Arakaki is of Japanese descendence. His grandparents were born in Japan, but his parents, Genoveva and Luis Enrique, were both born in Peru.

== Honours ==
=== International ===
Peru U15

- South American U-15 Championship: 2013
