= Juan José Oré =

Peruvian footballer and manager (born 1954)

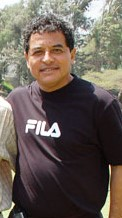
- JJ Oré in 2009

Personal information
- Full name: Juan José Oré Herrera
- Date of birth: June 12, 1954 (age 72)
- Place of birth: Lima, Peru
- Height: 1.70 m (5 ft 7 in)
- Position: Striker

Youth career
- 1965–1973: Universitario

Senior career*
| Years | Team | Apps | (Gls) |
| 1974–1979 | Universitario | | |
| 1979–1980 | Panathinaikos | | |
| 1980–1982 | OFI | | |
| 1982–1983 | Universitario | | |
| 1984 | Coronel Bolognesi | | |
| 1985 | Juventud La Palma | | |
| 1986 | Sporting Cristal | | |
| 1987 | Deportivo AELU | | |
| 1988 | CNI | | |
| 1988–1990 | Deportes Iquique | 58 | (26) |
| 1991 | Ciclista Lima | | |
| 1992 | Meteor-Lawn Tennis | | |

International career
| 1974 | Peru U20 | | |
| 1979 | Peru | 4 | (1) |

Managerial career
- 2006–2007: Peru U17
- 2008–2016: Peru U15
- * Club domestic league appearances and goals

Juan José Oré (born 12 June 1954) is a Peruvian football manager and a former striker.

== Playing career ==
Oré played professional football in Peru, Greece with Panathinaikos and OFI and Chile with Deportes Iquique. He won league titles in Peru with Universitario de Deportes and in Greece with Panathinaikos.

He was top scorer in Peru in 1978 with Universitario de Deportes and in Chile in 1988 with Deportes Iquique. he was also joint top scorer in Copa Libertadores 1979 with 6 goals.

== Coaching career ==
Oré has coached both the Peru national under-17 team and the Peru national under-15 team.

== Honours ==
=== Player ===
Universitario de Deportes

- Torneo Descentralizado (2): 1974, 1982

Individual

- Torneo Descentralizado: Top Goalscorer 1978 (19 goals)
- Copa Libertadores: Top Goalscorer 1979 (6 goals)
- Campeonato Nacional: Top goalscorer 1988 (18 goals)

=== Manager ===
Peru U15

- South American U-15 Championship: 2013
- Youth Olympic Games: 2014
