= 2021 FBC Melgar season =

FBC Melgar
2021 season
- Manager: Néstor Lorenzo (All Season)
- Stadium: Stadiums of Lima and Callao for Covid-19
- Liga 1: Fase 1: Nineth (9°) Liguilla A Copa Bicentenario: Round of 32; Fase 2: Fourth (4°); Aggregate Table: Fifth (5°); Fifth National (5°)
- Copa Sudamericana: First Stage; Group Stage: Second (2°) Group D
- Top goalscorer: League: Luis Iberico (12); All: Bernardo Cuesta (15); Luis Iberico (14); Jhonny Vidales (8); Cristian Bordacahar (8)
- Biggest win: 6–0 vs Univ. San Martín Fase 2 Match 15 (17 October 2021, Home Lima); 1–5 vs Deportivo Binacional Fase 2 Match 3 Liguilla B (1 August 2021, Away Lima)
- Biggest defeat: 3–1 vs UTC Fase 1 Match 4 Liguilla A (15 April 2021, Away Lima); 1–3 vs Alianza Atlético Fase 1 Match 7 Liguilla A (8 May 2021, Home Callao)
Home colours	Away colours	Third colours

The 2021 FBC Melgar season were the One-Hundred-Seventh (107.º) of the club from its foundation in 1915, Fifty-Two (52) participations in the top-flight of Peruvian Primera División (of 105 Editions) with denomination Liga 1. In Previous Season the club qualified to the 2021 Copa Sudamericana as 8th Place of the 2020 Liga 1.

Melgar were a of eighteen (18) clubs in the Third edition (3.º) Liga 1, the competition most important of the Peruvian football. The club played the Peruvian Primera División. In addition, it participated for the Fifth (5th) Time in its history in the Copa Sudamericana, the second most important club tournament at the continental level.

== Fase 1 (Liguilla A) ==
Pos	Team	Pld	W	D	L	GF	GA	GD	Pts
8	Academia Cantolao	9	3	1	5	8	13	-5	10
1	Melgar	9	2	3	4	11	12	-1	9

== See also ==
- FBC Melgar
- 2021 Liga 1
- 2021 Copa Bicentenario
