= Camilo Jiménez =

Peruvian footballer (born 1996)

Personal information
- Full name: Camilo César Jiménez Ballón
- Date of birth: 2 July 1996 (age 30)
- Place of birth: Lima, Peru
- Height: 1.89 m (6 ft 2 in)
- Position: Centre-back

Team information
- Current team: Deportivo Llacuabamba
- Number: 23

Youth career
- Universidad San Martín

Senior career*
Years	Team	Apps	(Gls)
2015	Zeta	6	(0)
2016	Universidad San Martín	0	(0)
2017	Deportivo Hualgayoc	17	(0)
2018–2019	Carlos A. Mannucci	44	(3)
2020	Carlos Stein	6	(0)
2021	Sport Boys	10	(0)
2022	Sport Chavelines	16	(2)
2023–	Deportivo Llacuabamba	44	(1)

International career
2011	Peru U15		
2013	Peru U17	4	(0)
- * Club domestic league appearances and goals as of 14:43, 19 October 2025 (UTC)

Camilo César Jiménez Ballón (born 2 July 1996) is a Peruvian footballer who plays as a centre-back for Peruvian Segunda División side Deportivo Llacuabamba.

== Club career ==
=== FK Zeta ===
Jiménez is a product of Universidad San Martín. At the age of 18, Jiménez went on a trial at Montenegrin club FK Zeta in January 2015. He played his first game for the club on 31 January 2015 in a friendly game against FK Dečić. In mid-February, he officially signed with the Montenegrin club.

He got his official debut for the club on 11 March 2015 against OFK Petrovac. Jiménez started on the bench, before replacing Luka Klikovac in the 66th minute. He played a total of six games for Zeta.

=== Return to Peru ===
Jiménez returned to Peru and played a season with his former club Universidad San Martín, acting on the club's reserve team. In 2017 he moved to Deportivo Hualgayoc in the Peruvian Segunda División, before joining fellow league club, Carlos A. Mannucci, on 2 February 2018. With 24 appearances in 2018, he helped Manucci securing promotion to the Peruvian Primera División for the 2019 season.

On 3 January 2020 it was confirmed, that Jiménez had joined Peruvian Primera División club FC Carlos Stein on a one-year deal. After a year at Stein, Jiménez moved to Sport Boys for the 2021, confirming the deal on 22 December 2020.

In January 2022, Jiménez moved to Peruvian Segunda División side Sport Chavelines. In January 2023, he joined Deportivo Llacuabamba.

== International career ==
Jímenez has played games for both the Peruvian U15 and U17 national teams. He was also called up for the Peruvian U20 national team, but never made his debut.
