= Turey El Taíno =

Puerto Rican comic

- Cover art by Ricardo Álvarez Rivón

Publication information
- Publisher: Editorial Manos; El Mundo; El Nuevo Día
- Schedule: Weekly
- Format: Comic strip
- Publication date: October 26, 1989
- Main character(s): Turey; Tureycito; Yari

Creative team as of 2014
- Created by: Ricardo Álvarez-Rivón
- Penciller(s): Ricardo Álvarez-Rivón
- Inker(s): Ricardo Álvarez-Rivón
- Colorist(s): Ricardo Álvarez-Rivón

Turey El Taíno is a Puerto Rican publication that remains the most long-standing local comic to date. Originally available in stand-alone magazines and in a strip featured on the now defunct El Mundo newspaper, Turey debuted in news stands on October 26, 1989. Published by Editorial Manos and written and drawn by Ricardo Álvarez-Rivón, Turey shows its readers the way the Taínos used to live before Puerto Rico was discovered by Christopher Columbus and his crew. It also depicts the many different words and instruments they used and how they battled their arch-enemies, the Caribs. Between 1991 and 2006, Turey strips were published in El Nuevo Día. Álvarez-Rivón continues to write and illustrate the Turey comic strips with the collaboration of his wife, Magali Álvarez-Rivón.

In 1999, the USPS's Hato Rey station honored the magazine by nicknaming the station the Turey station.

== Publication history ==
Puerto Rican artist Jorge Rechani first instructed Álvarez Rivón in basic illustration at Colegio San José, from where he graduated in 1968. During this timeframe, he had become heavily invested in comics, avidly following the work of Will Eisner and other authors. Despite emphasizing in his professional career, Álvarez Rivón continued to practice and refine his illustration abilities. In 1979, he became the Art Director of a magazine named Torito y sus amiguitos (lit. "Torito and friends") and worked along José Miguel Agrelot, where he first published what he later referred to as a "precursor to Turey". Álvarez Rivón's work in Torito y sus amiguitos, headlined by Coquí Lindo, featured the same educational content that he would later use in Turey. He continued to publish these for a period of approximately four years. As a reader of other Latin American comic series such as Condorito and Mafalda, Álvarez Rivón felt that Puerto Rico needed its own autochthonous series. Due to his work in public relations, he identified that this niche was unexploited.

Aided by his wife, Magali J. Meléndez, Álvarez Rivón then began the process of creating Turey, a character that he intended to portray as a "Puerto Rican hero" that could serve as a positive role model for children, but without being excessively theatric or unrealistic. In his efforts to create a relatable character, he noted that Turey was never meant to be a superhero, "he was not Superman […] he was a human character". When the approach to the character was tilting towards idealism, Meléndez contributed to keep it more realistic. At the time there were some comic authors in Puerto Rico such as Pepe Vázquez and Pedro Cortés, but none were employing the cultural aspects that Álvarez Rivón included in Turey. After settling on the idea that a Puerto Rican Taíno was the best choice for the main character, he invested heavily in familiarizing himself with their culture and customs, buying several history books in an effort to make his work as didactic as possible. The name choose is the Taíno word for "sky". After deciding that the best format was to print the comic in magazines, Álvarez Rivón and Meléndez began pursuing someone that could finance their work. However, after visiting several banks, their own personal savings were used along some sponsors. To reduce production costs, the couple was forced to contract a Miami-based print works. Hurricane Hugo delayed the debut of the series, since it prevented the copies from shipping. Originally intended for the first week of the month, the first issue of Turey was published on October 26, 1989.

Only three days later, the comic strip variant debuted in the Gente Joven (lit. "Young People") section of the now-defunct El Mundo. All of the original comics employed the same format, a fully colored cover featuring the series’ logo and its slogan, ACCIÓN, ENTRETENIMIENTO, AVENTURA (lit. "Action, Entertainment, Adventure"), with black-and-white interior art. However, the newspaper variant featured colored strips. Turey was self-published by Editorial Manos, with Álvarez Rivón in charge of illustrating and writing while Meléndez was in charge of distribution. Approx. 10,000 of each issue were printed monthly and sold in several businesses, including pharmacies and other unorthodox places. Initially, around 5,000 or 6,000 remained unsold, which were then stored by advertising agencies and later redistributed as promotional material. The number of copies was later limited to 7,000-8,000 monthly copies. This first effort did cost them some losses, something that they solved by innovating their approach. Meléndez decided to expand the brand by selling the Turey character as a mascot to several companies. Locally, it replaced Ernie Keebler as Keebler Company's mascot.

The government also adopted Turey, first becoming the image of the Puerto Rico Electric Power Authority. This was followed by an alliance with the Puerto Rico Department of Education, which led to the creation of seven publications. A van labelled with Turey el Taíno el cómic de aquí: el cómic número uno de Puerto Rico (lit. "Turey the Taíno the local comic: the number one comic in Puerto Rico") was used to promote the publication, traveling as far as Mayagüez and working along drink bottler Malta India and radio station Sistema 102. The year after El Mundo closed, El Nuevo Día's Graphic Director and a comic enthusiast himself, José Luis Díaz de Villegas, brought the Turey comic strip to that newspaper. There the sequences were featured in a section titled Muñequitos (lit. "Cartoons") of the En Grande (lit. "In a Big Way") Sunday supplement. Turey shared this space with several local comics, including Nadia Martín's Tuta y Tita and Nick Ianone's Paladín El Cacique y los Campeadores Boricuas, as well as foreign publications. However, the section was systematically reduced to create space and reduce costs, eventually disappearing. Despite this, Turey survived and continued being published in the children-friendly Mi Pequeño Día (lit. "My Little Day"), being joined by Martín Gaudier's Tato y Kenepo.

Afterwards, Álvarez Rivón made an effort to bring the character to contemporary relevancy. In its original run, the Turey comic book magazines published 35 issues, with the last one being released in June 1995. This was the longest run of a stand-alone comic book magazine in Puerto Rico. In its newspaper format, the comic strips continued to be published on a regular basis. Eventually, the supplement's editor, Josefina Barceló, requested that the Turey strips were simplified and easier to understand. However, Álvarez Rivón and Meléndez did not agree with this, feeling that it would damage its intellectual property. Barceló's demands were regarded as ridiculous and heavily deviated from its source material, with the artist noting particular discontent with an Easter strip where Turey was depicted practicing the Anglo-Saxon tradition of finding Easter eggs. After growing frustrations, Álvarez Rivón and Meléndez decided to withdraw the comic strip from El Nuevo Día in 2006, ending a 15-year run in that newspaper. The decision was made public in one last strip, which almost went unpublished.

== Art style ==
Throughout the years, Turey has featured the work of several illustrators and artists. Among them are Arturo Vilmenay, David Álvarez, and Reynaldo León, who went on to create their own series and characters. However, this also led to wildly fluctuating and contrasting art styles. In its initial form, Álvarez Rivón employed an art style that heavily incorporated textures and emphasized lighting and shadowing which has been described as "attractive [and] dynamic". His work featured aspects from older cartoon and comic strips, such as the employment of onomatopoeias and visual metaphors. His use of facial expressions bears a resemblance to that of Quino. Álvarez Rivón also used this art style to convey environmental hazards and other panoramic features. Lettering of the speech balloons was done by hand, and also featured the work of Vilmenay, who employed a different style for the character of Baracutey to emphasize his emotionless demeanor. The topic of issue 32 was based on a suggestion of Vilmenay, where the sister of a now deceased Baracutey steals his body bent on revenge, with the artist providing a realistic and detailed cover that distanced itself from Álvarez Rivón's style to depict a more vile and dark character.

Of the guest artists, León was the one that took more liberty with the artistic license. His work in issues 14, 33, 34 and 35 was notably cartoonish, heavily depending on exaggeration to emphasize its humor. David Álvarez collaborated with illustrations in issues 20, 22, 23 and 25, also inking issue 21. Finally, Pepe "J.H. Vazz" Vázquez's guest artist collaboration deviates from the art style used by all other artists, employing his personal illustration and shadowing style. Despite these variations, the content of the comic remained unchanged, with Álvarez Rivón noting that regardless of the illustration quality his priority was always the quality of the script. All of these artists, and several invited guests such as Eddie Ortiz, Nadia Martín, Paco López, Vicente Avilés, Freddy Camareno and Arturo Yépez, were featured in interviews included within the comics.

== Characters ==
- Turey: family leader, adventurer, father of Tureycito.
- Tureycito: son of Turey, inquisitive, acts like a child because he is a child.
- Yaya: wife of Turey.
- Batu: comedic character, always prefers to stay on the safe side of things.
- Baracutey: cold blooded warrior, but loyal to his friends. He possesses almost inhuman strength and many times is portrayed fighting sharks and other hard to beat opponents.
- Mambi: leader of the Caribs, who later befriends Turey

== Plot ==
Set in 1490, only two years before the arrival of Christopher Columbus to the Americas, the comic follows the life of a Taíno yucayeque or village in the island of Borikén (Puerto Rico). Among them was a member of the worker naboría class named Turey, who despite being significantly shorter than his counterparts, dreamed of becoming a member of cacique Yaguaca's royal guard. The series also follows the exploits of his family, particularly his wife Yaya and his son Tureycito, as well as his friends and other members of the village. Eventually, Turey's courage earned him the respect of his yucayeque. In its different issues, Álvarez Rivón covers different aspects of Taíno culture, ranging from their complete reliance on nature to their territorial disputes with the neighboring Carib tribes. However, these aspects are included as part of a larger story, which in turn balance its educational content with entertainment. After its third issue, the stories ended with a moral message authored by Meléndez. Each issue introduced new words from the Taíno language, with their meaning being discussed in detail in a section titled Vocabulario Taíno (lit. "Taíno Vocabulary") included towards the end of each magazine. The newspaper strips relaxed this dynamic, focusing on a humorous approach that sometimes bordered on the absurd, surreal or hypothetical. From 2000 onwards, Turey was more often depicted in large single-panel strips depicting his reaction when placed in contemporary situations or historical events, a change based on the editorial decisions of El Nuevo Día's staff.

== Reception ==
Finding original copies of the comics is difficult, something that has made it a sought after item among collectors. The entire collection is available in two volumes, and the cost of each has been estimated to be $150 per book. Turey earned the approval of author Abelardo Díaz Alfaro, who congratulated Álvarez Rivón on both his illustrations and the comic's capacity to transmit educational material about the Taínos. Likewise, Ricardo Alegría praised its timing, noting that the publication appeared just when it was needed, in years after native archeological sites were being unearthed in Tibes and Caguana. Despite featuring an art style that mostly appealed to preteens and teenagers, Turey was followed by children as young as 9-years old and was used as a resource by several school teachers. The popularity gathered during its initial run allowed the brand to expand, eventually branching into other products. Among these was a puppet show featuring Turey, Yaya and Tureycito, which was mostly a musical albeit with educational content. The marionettes were handled by two independent performers. The shows gathered contracts with the government and other entities, often being sponsored by corporations such as Mattel or Coca-Cola. Likewise, the Puerto Rico Department of Education sponsored several related presentations.

Its local popularity opened doors beyond Puerto Rico, with anglosaxon McGraw-Hill publishing a licensed English book titled Laugh 'n' Learn Spanish: Turey el Taíno, authored by Brenda Wegmann and Llanca Letelier. However, not all of the international attention gathered was positive. On three separate occasions, Turey was plagiarized by foreign publishers. In October 2005, WAPA-TV gave Turey its first television segment in its morning newscast, Noticentro 4 Al Amanecer (lit. "Noticentro 4 in the Morning"). El Mensaje Positivo de Turey el Taíno (lit. "The Positive Message of Turey the Taíno") was animated with Adobe Flash, and in 30-second vignettes the character would transmit a motivational message. In November 2017, the character migrated to Univision Puerto Rico where it served as a host of educational segments named Aprendiendo con Turey el Taíno (lit. "Learning with Turey the Taíno"), ending a decade in its previous television spot.

The Institute of Puerto Rican Culture honored Turey by publishing a book about the character, which included a collection of the comic strips. Turey is also the principal figure on an educational pamphlet published by El Nuevo Día Educador ("ENDE"). The United States Postal Service honored Turey and his creator in 1999, by presenting a cancelled postal stamp and renaming the postal station in Plaza Las Americas in San Juan, Puerto Rico, the "Turey Postal Station". On November 10, 1999, The Puerto Rican House of Representatives, honored Álvarez Rivón and presented him with a plaque. The titular character received a recognition during the 2013 San Sebastián Festival, an annual cultural event celebrated in the vicinity of Old San Juan.
