= Renzo Garcés =

Peruvian footballer (born 1996)

Personal information
- Full name: Renzo Renato Garcés Mori
- Date of birth: 12 June 1996 (age 30)
- Place of birth: Pucallpa, Peru
- Height: 1.80 m (5 ft 11 in)
- Position: Centre-back

Team information
- Current team: Alianza Lima
- Number: 6

Senior career*
Years	Team	Apps	(Gls)
2014–2016	Universidad de San Martín	52	(2)
2017–2020	Sporting Cristal	40	(0)
2019–2020	→ Universidad César Vallejo (loan)	46	(3)
2021–2023	Universidad César Vallejo	82	(2)
2024–	Alianza Lima	85	(3)

International career^{‡}
2013	Peru U17	7	(3)
2015	Peru U20	7	(0)
2015	Peru U22	1	(0)
2022–	Peru U23	1	(0)
2022–	Peru	19	(1)
- * Club domestic league appearances and goals as of 18 September 2026 ‡ National team caps and goals as of 6 October 2026

Renzo Renato Garcés Mori (born 12 June 1996) is a Peruvian professional footballer who plays as a centre-back for Peruvian Primera División club Alianza Lima and the Peru national team.

== Club career ==
In December 2023, Garcés signed for Alianza Lima.

== Career statistics ==
=== Club ===
As of match played on 19 September 2026.

Club	Season	League			Cup		Continental		Total	
Club	Season	Division	Apps	Goals	Apps	Goals	Apps	Goals	Apps	Goals
Universidad de San Martín	2014	Peruvian Liga 1	5	0	1	0	—		6	0
Universidad de San Martín	2015	Peruvian Liga 1	9	0	3	0	—		12	0
Universidad de San Martín	2016	Peruvian Liga 1	38	2	—		—		38	2
Universidad de San Martín	Total		52	2	4	0	0	0	56	2
Sporting Cristal	2017	Peruvian Liga 1	28	0	—		3	0	31	0
Sporting Cristal	2018	Peruvian Liga 1	12	0	—		—		12	0
Sporting Cristal	Total		40	0	0	0	3	0	43	0
Universidad César Vallejo	2019	Peruvian Liga 1	26	3	2	0	—		28	3
Universidad César Vallejo	2020	Peruvian Liga 1	20	0	—		—		20	0
Universidad César Vallejo	2021	Peruvian Liga 1	22	1	—		2	0	24	1
Universidad César Vallejo	2022	Peruvian Liga 1	30	1	—		2	0	32	1
Universidad César Vallejo	2023	Peruvian Liga 1	30	0	—		6	0	36	0
Universidad César Vallejo	Total		128	5	2	0	10	0	140	5
Alianza Lima	2024	Peruvian Liga 1	33	2	—		6	0	39	2
Alianza Lima	2025	Peruvian Liga 1	27	1	—		16	0	43	1
Alianza Lima	2026	Peruvian Liga 1	25	5	—		2	0	27	5
Alianza Lima	Total		85	8	—		24	0	109	8
Career total			305	14	6	0	37	0	348	14

=== International ===
As of match played 6 October 2026

Appearances and goals by national team and year
National team	Year	Apps	Goals
Peru	2022	2	0
Peru	2024	2	0
Peru	2025	9	0
Peru	2026	6	1
Total		19	1

Scores and results list Peru’s goal tally first.

No.	Date	Venue	Opponent	Score	Result	Competition
1.	5 June 2026	Nu Stadium, Miami, United States	Haiti	1–1	2–1	Friendly

== Honours ==
Universidad de San Martín

- Torneo del Inca runner-up: 2014

Sporting Cristal

- Torneo Descentralizado: 2018
