= Francisca Moroso =

Chilean footballer (born 1993)

Personal information
- Full name: Francisca Moroso Velasco
- Date of birth: 20 March 1993 (age 33)
- Place of birth: Santiago, Chile
- Height: 1.61 m (5 ft 3 in)
- Position: Forward

Senior career*
Years	Team	Apps	(Gls)
2007–2010	Universidad Católica		
2013–2016	Colo-Colo		
2017–2018	Universidad de Chile		
2018–2019	CFF Cáceres		
2019	Sporting Gijón	2	(0)
2020–2021	Universidad Católica		
2025	Unión La Calera		

International career
2010	Chile U17	3	(0)
2013–2017	Chile	8	(1)
Medal record
Women's football
Representing Chile
South American Games
Silver medal – second place	2014 Santiago	Team
- * Club domestic league appearances and goals

Francisca Moroso Velasco (born 20 March 1993) is a Chilean former footballer who played as a forward. She was a member of the Chile women's national team.

== Club career ==
After spending her first years playing in Chile, in 2018, Moroso moved for signing with Spanish team CFF Cáceres.

On 20 September 2019, Moroso agreed terms with Segunda División team Sporting de Gijón. However, on 8 November 2019, the club and the player parted ways for personal reasons.

Moroso announced that she retired from football through her social media on 25 Oct, 2021. In June 2025, she returned to the activity by signing with Unión La Calera.

== International career ==
Moroso has represented Chile at the 2010 FIFA U-17 Women's World Cup. At senior level, she played the 2013 International Women's Football Tournament of Brasília, the 2014 South American Games and the 2014 Copa América Femenina.

== Personal life ==
Moroso married a namesake woman in October 2025.

== Honours ==
Chile

- South American Games Silver medal: 2014
