= Mathías Pinto =

Chilean footballer (born 1998)

Personal information
- Full name: Mathías Daniel Pinto Mell
- Date of birth: July 13, 1998 (age 28)
- Place of birth: Santiago, Chile
- Height: 1.66 m (5 ft 5 in)
- Position: Forward

Team information
- Current team: Deportes Santa Cruz

Youth career
- Universidad de Chile

Senior career*
| Years | Team | Apps | (Gls) |
| 2016–2018 | Universidad de Chile | 0 | (0) |
| 2017 | → San Marcos (loan) | 1 | (0) |
| 2018 | → Deportes Melipilla (loan) | 23 | (8) |
| 2019–2022 | Ñublense | 45 | (14) |
| 2020 | → Coquimbo Unido (loan) | 11 | (3) |
| 2023 | Deportes Iquique | 26 | (5) |
| 2024 | Deportes Santa Cruz | 26 | (7) |
| 2025 | Rangers | 11 | (0) |
| 2026– | Deportes Santa Cruz | 0 | (0) |

International career^{‡}
| 2013 | Chile U15 | 6 | (2) |
| 2014–2015 | Chile U17 | 5 | (3) |
| 2019 | Chile U22 | 3 | (1) |
- * Club domestic league appearances and goals as of 24 November 2025 ‡ National team caps and goals as of 13 June 2019

Mathías Daniel Pinto Mell (born July 13, 1998) is a Chilean footballer who currently plays as forward for Deportes Santa Cruz.

== Career ==
After becoming top goalscorer at all youth categories of Universidad de Chile, he debuted at the age of 16 years scoring one goal in a match against Santiago Morning at the Copa Chile. Later, he was loaned to Primera B clubs San Marcos and Melipilla.

On 2019 season, he became Top Goalscorer of the Primera B, scoring 14 goals. So, on 2020 he joined Primera División club Coquimbo Unido, playing also at the 2020 Copa Sudamericana.

In the 2023 season, Pinto got promotion to the Chilean top division with Deportes Iquique. The next season, he joined Deportes Santa Cruz. In 2025, he moved to Rangers de Talca.

Pinto returned to Deportes Santa Cruz for the 2026 season.

== International career ==
Pinto represented Chile U15 at the 2013 South American Championship and Chile U17 at both the 2014 South American Games and the 2015 FIFA World Cup, playing one match against Nigeria. Also, he represented Chile U23 at the 2019 Maurice Revello Tournament, playing three matches and scoring one goal.

== Career statistics ==
=== Club ===
As of 25 September 2020

| Club | Season | League | | | Cup | | Continental | | Other | | Total | |
| Club | Season | Division | Apps | Goals | Apps | Goals | Apps | Goals | Apps | Goals | Apps | Goals |
|---|---|---|---|---|---|---|---|---|---|---|---|---|
| Universidad de Chile | 2014–15 | Primera; División | 0 | 0 | 1 | 1 | 0 | 0 | 0 | 0 | 1 | 1 |
| Universidad de Chile | 2015–16 | Primera; División | 0 | 0 | 0 | 0 | 0 | 0 | 0 | 0 | 0 | 0 |
| Universidad de Chile | 2016–17 | Primera; División | 0 | 0 | 0 | 0 | 0 | 0 | 0 | 0 | 0 | 0 |
| Universidad de Chile | Total | | 0 | 0 | 1 | 1 | 0 | 0 | 0 | 0 | 1 | 1 |
| San Marcos (loan) | 2017–T | Primera B | 1 | 0 | 2 | 0 | 0 | 0 | 2 (Note: Appearances in the Promotion playoff) | 0 | 5 | 0 |
| Melipilla (loan) | 2018 | Primera B | 23 | 8 | 0 | 0 | 0 | 0 | 0 | 0 | 23 | 8 |
| Coquimbo Unido (loan) | 2020 | Primera; División | 11 | 3 | 0 | 0 | 1 (Note: Appearances in the Copa Sudamericana) | 0 | 0 | 0 | 12 | 3 |
| Ñublense | 2019 | Primera B | 23 | 14 | 3 | 0 | 0 | 0 | 0 | 0 | 26 | 14 |
| Ñublense | 2020 | Primera B | 0 | 0 | 0 | 0 | 0 | 0 | 0 | 0 | 0 | 0 |
| Ñublense | Total | | 23 | 14 | 3 | 0 | 0 | 0 | 0 | 0 | 26 | 14 |
| Total career | | | 58 | 25 | 6 (Note: Appearances in the Copa Chile) | 1 | 1 | 0 | 2 | 0 | 67 | 26 |

=== International ===
As of match played 13 June 2019

Appearances and goals by national team and year
| National team | Year | Competition | Apps | Goals |
|---|---|---|---|---|
| Chile U15 | 2013 | South American Championship | 6 | 2 |
| Chile U17 | 2014 | South American Games | 4 | 3 |
| Chile U17 | 2015 | FIFA World Cup | 1 | 0 |
| Chile U22 | 2019 | Maurice Revello Tournament | 3 | 1 |
| Total | | | 14 | 6 |

== Honours ==
Universidad de Chile

- Primera División (1): 2017-C

Individual

- Primera B de Chile Top Scorer (1): 2019
