= Ricardo Álvarez (Chilean footballer) =

Chilean footballer (born 1999)

Personal information
- Full name: Ricardo Abraham Álvarez Casanova
- Date of birth: 10 February 1999 (age 27)
- Place of birth: Santiago, Chile
- Height: 1.74 m (5 ft 9 in)
- Position: Midfielder

Youth career
- Colo-Colo

Senior career*
Years	Team	Apps	(Gls)
2014–2018	Colo-Colo	3	(0)
2019	Huachipato	0	(0)
2021	Trasandino	–	(–)
2022	Brujas de Salamanca	–	(–)

International career
2013	Chile U15		
2014–2015	Chile U17	6	(0)
- * Club domestic league appearances and goals as of 27 April 2022

Ricardo Abraham Álvarez Casanova (born 10 February 1999) is a Chilean footballer who plays as a midfielder. He has represented his country at under-15 and under-17 level.

== Club career ==
Álvarez was born in Santiago. He made his senior debut for Colo-Colo at the age of 15 years, 96 days, as a 77th-minute substitute against Palestino in the group stages of the 2014–15 Copa Chile on 17 May 2014. Palestino scored the only goal of the match a minute later. He made his first appearance in the Primera División on the opening day of the 2017 Clausura, again as a substitute, in a 3–0 win away to Unión Española, and made his first start on 15 October 2017, as Colo-Colo beat Santiago Wanderers 3–0 to go top of the 2017 Transición table.

In 2020 he didn't play professional football. In 2021 he returned to the football activity and joined Trasandino de Los Andes in the Tercera A, the fourth category of the Chilean football. In 2022, he joined Brujas de Salamanca.

== International career ==
Internationally, Álvarez was a regular member of the Chile under-15 squad in 2013. He was in the squad at the 2013 Montaigu Tournament in March, played at the Torneo de Gradisca in May and in the Copa México de Naciones in August, and scored twice at the South American U15 Championships, once in the group stage and once as Chile lost the third-place play-off.

He played for Chile under-17 at both the 2014 South American Games and the 2015 South American U17 Championships.

== Career statistics ==
As of matches played on 24 November 2018.

Club	Season	League			Cup		Total	
Club	Season	Division	Apps	Goals	Apps	Goals	Apps	Goals
Colo-Colo	2014–15	Chilean Primera División	0	0	1	0	1	0
Colo-Colo	2016–17	Chilean Primera División	1	0	0	0	1	0
Colo-Colo	2017	Chilean Primera División	2	0	0	0	2	0
Career totals			3	0	1	0	4	0

== Honours ==
Colo-Colo

- Primera División: 2015–A, 2017–T
- Copa Chile: 2016
- Supercopa de Chile: 2017

Trasandino

- Tercera A: 2021
