= Luis Salas =

Chilean footballer (born 1998)

Personal information
- Full name: Luis Marcelo Salas Candia
- Date of birth: 19 May 1998 (age 28)
- Place of birth: Santiago, Chile
- Height: 1.73 m (5 ft 8 in)
- Position: Striker

Youth career
- Colo-Colo

Senior career*
Years	Team	Apps	(Gls)
2016–2019	Colo-Colo	1	(0)
2018	→ Deportes Antofagasta (loan)	9	(1)
2019	Deportes Recoleta	12	(1)
Total		22	(2)

International career
2014–2015	Chile U17	5	(0)
- * Club domestic league appearances and goals as of 26 November 2022

Luis Marcelo Salas Candia (born 19 May 1998) is a Chilean former footballer who played as a striker.

== Career ==
A product of Colo-Colo youth system, he played on loan at Deportes Antofagasta in 2018. In 2019, he played for Deportes Recoleta in the Segunda División Profesional de Chile.

At international level, he represented the Chile national under-17 team in both the 2014 South American Games and the 2015 World Cup.
