= Santiago Ramírez (footballer, born 1998) =

Uruguayan footballer

Personal information
- Full name: Santiago Ramírez Debali
- Date of birth: 12 March 1998 (age 28)
- Place of birth: Paysandú, Uruguay
- Height: 1.75 m (5 ft 9 in)
- Position: Left forward

Team information
- Current team: Club Deportivo Olimpia de Honduras
- Number: 18

Youth career
- –2016: Danubio

Senior career*
Years	Team	Apps	(Gls)
2016–2018	Danubio	2	(0)
2018	→ Deportivo Maldonado (loan)	8	(0)
2019–2020	Central Español	16	(3)
2021	Villa Española	18	(2)
2022	La Luz	23	(5)
2023	Guayaquil City	11	(0)
2023–2024	Cerro	39	(4)
2025–	Racing Club de Montevideo	19	(2)
- * Club domestic league appearances and goals as of 1 October 2025

Santiago Ramírez Debali (born 12 March 1998) is an Uruguayan footballer who plays for Racing Club de Montevideo as a left forward.
