= Ricardo Álvarez-Rivón =

Puerto Rican comic book creator

- Born: c. 1950s San Juan, Puerto Rico
- Areas: Cartoonist, Penciller
- Notable works: Turey el Taino

Ricardo Álvarez-Rivón (born c. 1950) is the creator of Turey el Taino, Puerto Rico's most successful locally produced comic book-magazine.

== Early life ==
Álvarez-Rivón, who drew comics since his childhood years, was born in San Juan, Puerto Rico and studied art and drawing in the University of Puerto Rico. Álvarez-Rivón wanted to come up with a different concept in comics, a comic which would entertain as well as educate children and adults alike. He then worked on an idea about a Taino and his adventures.

== Turey el Taino ==
On October 26, 1989, Turey el Taino, published by Editorial Manos, made its debut in the news and magazine stands in stores all over Puerto Rico. Turey el Taino is what is known as a "comic magazine". Instead of the regular comic format, this comic comes in the form of a magazine. It was first printed in black and white. Turey is a lovable chubby guy with two sons and a very dominating wife. Turey goes on all kinds of adventures, accompanied by his best friend "Batu", the tribe witchdoctor "Baracutey" and "Tureycito", one of his sons. They either face the "ferocious" Caribs or fight evil spirits. The comic book is education-oriented, as it teaches how the Tainos must have lived before the arrival of the Spaniards. The comic book also contains a section where the letters and drawings from the fans are published. The first newspaper to publish the adventures of Turey was "El Mundo" of Puerto Rico. Soon, the adventures of Turey were being published in color in the Sunday newspaper pages of El Nuevo Día.

== Recognitions and honors ==
The Institute of Puerto Rican Culture honored "Turey" by publishing a book on the character, which included a collection of the comic strips. "Turey" is also the principal figure on an educational pamphlet published by "ENDE" (El Nuevo Día Educador). The U.S. Postal Service honored "Turey el Taino" and his creator in 1999, by presenting a cancelled postal stamp and renaming the postal station in "Plaza Las Americas" in Puerto Rico, the "Turey Postal Station". On November 10, 1999, The Puerto Rican House of Representatives, honored "Turey's" creator Ricardo Álvarez-Rivón and presented him with a plaque. Álvarez-Rivón continues to write and illustrate the "Turey" comic strips with the collaboration of his wife, Magali Álvarez-Rivón.

== See also ==
- List of Puerto Ricans
