= Jesús Mendieta =

Peruvian footballer (born 1998)

Personal information
- Full name: Jesús Alexander Mendieta Rojas
- Date of birth: 11 April 1998 (age 28)
- Place of birth: Lima, Peru
- Height: 1.73 m (5 ft 8 in)
- Position: Left-back

Team information
- Current team: Alianza Universidad
- Number: 19

Youth career
- Sporting Cristal

Senior career*
Years	Team	Apps	(Gls)
2017–2019	Sporting Cristal	0	(0)
2017	→ Alianza Atlético (loan)	10	(0)
2018–2019	→ Ayacucho (loan)	14	(0)
2020–2022	Ayacucho	69	(2)
2023–2024	Alianza Atlético	52	(2)
2025–	Alianza Universidad	27	(0)

International career
2013	Peru U15		
2015	Peru U17	4	(0)
- * Club domestic league appearances and goals as of 30 December 2025

Jesús Alexander Mendieta Rojas (born 11 April 1998) is a Peruvian footballer who plays as a left-back for Peruvian Primera División side Alianza Universidad.

== Career ==
=== Club career ===
Mendieta started in football by participating in inter-neighborhood tournaments in the Chorrillos District, later going to an academy called "Todos Juntos" where he began his training. He then joined Atletico Minero, a football club based in Matucana, with which he participated in the Copa Federación, a tournament for youths organized by the Peruvian Football Federation.

In 2016, Mendieta was promoted to Sporting Cristal's reserve team and one year later - in 2017 - to the first team. However, he was not able to get his debut and he was then loaned out to Alianza Atlético on 24 August 2017 for the rest of the year. He made 10 appearances for the club.

In the summer 2018, he joined Ayacucho FC on loan. The loan deal was later extended for the 2019 season as well. Mendieta's contract with Sporting Cristal expired at the end of 2019 and he then joined Ayacucho on permanent basis.

Ahead of the 2023 season, Mendieta moved to his former club, Alianza Atlético; a club he formerly played for on loan in the 2017 season. Ahead of the 2025 season, he then moved to newly promoted Peruvian Primera División side Alianza Universidad.

== International career ==
Mendieta was one of the figures of the Peruvian 15 national team that won the 2013 2013 South American U-15 Championship title in Bolivia. He finished as Peru's third top scorer with two goals. He was also a part of the U17 national team squad in the 2015 South American U-17 Championship in Paraguay.
