= Matías Roskopf =

Argentine footballer

Personal information
- Full name: Matías Exequiel Roskopf
- Date of birth: 14 January 1998 (age 28)
- Place of birth: Paraná, Argentina
- Height: 1.83 m (6 ft 0 in)
- Position: Forward

Youth career
- 2007–2012: Colón
- 2012–2018: Boca Juniors

Senior career*
Years	Team	Apps	(Gls)
2018–2019	Boca Juniors	0	(0)
2018	→ Torque (loan)	25	(3)
2019	Hermannstadt	0	(0)
2019–2020	Rapid București	17	(3)
2020	Apollon Limassol	1	(0)
2020	Universitatea Cluj	3	(0)
2021	Cavalry FC	0	(0)
2021	Central Español	0	(0)
2022	Colón F.C.	0	(0)
2023	Atlante	4	(0)

International career
- Argentina U15
2015	Argentina U17	10	(1)
- * Club domestic league appearances and goals as of 30 December 2020

Matías Exequiel Roskopf (born 14 January 1998) is an Argentine professional footballer who plays as a forward for Uruguayan club Central Español.

== Club career ==
=== Boca Juniors ===
Roskopf started out in the youth ranks of Colón in 2007, prior to joining Boca Juniors five years later. In 2018, Roskopf joined Uruguayan Primera División side Torque on loan. He made his professional debut on 3 February, coming on as a second-half substitute against Nacional as Torque lost 2–4. He made his first start on 28 March against Boston River, which was followed by Roskopf scoring the first goals of his senior career in his next start during a 2–0 win over Peñarol on 31 March. He returned to Boca in December after twenty-five games and three goals as Torque were relegated.

=== Hermannstadt ===
Roskopf joined Romania's Hermannstadt in 2019. Roskopf was unable to appear for Hermannstadt in 2018–19 due to registration issues, after the club discovered he didn't have the required paperwork; with the forward subsequently applying for Italian citizenship whilst under contract.

=== Rapid București ===
However, in May 2019, Roskopf signed an agreement to join newly promoted Liga II side Rapid București for 2019–20. His bow arrived on 20 August in a 3–1 loss to Turris Turnu Măgurele, while his first goal came on 1 September versus CSM Reșița. He departed after three goals in seventeen matches.

=== Apollon Limassol ===
In January 2020, Roskopf agreed a move to Cyprus with Apollon Limassol. He appeared for his debut on 9 February against Enosis Neon Paralimni, participating for thirty-three minutes of a one-goal home defeat. That was his sole appearance in the First Division, in a season that was curtailed due to the COVID-19 pandemic one month later.

=== Universitatea Cluj ===
On 22 August, Roskopf sealed a return to Romanian football with Liga II outfit Universitatea Cluj. After just one start from three appearances, he mutually terminated his contract on 1 November – with the Cluj-Napoca club claiming a return to Boca Juniors was in the pipeline, though that never materialized.

=== Cavalry FC ===
On 30 December 2020, Roskopf signed with Canadian Premier League side Cavalry FC. However, due to issues caused by the COVID-19 pandemic preventing Roskopf from being able to join the team due to travel restrictions, they mutually agreed to terminate the contract on 15 April 2021 to allow Roskopf to join a new club.

=== Central Español ===
On 24 April 2021, Roskopf signed with Uruguayan Segunda División side Central Español.

== International career ==
In 2015, Roskopf represented Argentina at the 2015 South American U-17 Championship and 2015 FIFA U-17 World Cup. He scored once in seven matches at the U17 Championship in Paraguay, which preceded three appearances at the subsequent U17 World Cup in Chile. He had previously featured for the U15s, notably at the 2013 South American U-15 Championship, whilst also training against the senior squad before the 2015 Copa América.

== Career statistics ==
As of 30 December 2020.

Appearances and goals by club, season and competition
Club	Season	League			Cup		League Cup		Continental		Other		Total	
Club	Season	Division	Apps	Goals	Apps	Goals	Apps	Goals	Apps	Goals	Apps	Goals	Apps	Goals
Boca Juniors	2017–18	Argentine Primera División	0	0	0	0	—		0	0	0	0	0	0
Boca Juniors	2018–19	Argentine Primera División	0	0	0	0	0	0	0	0	0	0	0	0
Boca Juniors	Total		0	0	0	0	0	0	0	0	0	0	0	0
Torque (loan)	2018	Uruguayan Primera División	25	3	—		—		—		0	0	25	3
Hermannstadt	2018–19	Liga I	0	0	0	0	—		—		0	0	0	0
Rapid București	2019–20	Liga II	17	3	0	0	—		—		0	0	17	3
Apollon Limassol	2019–20	First Division	1	0	0	0	—		—		0	0	1	0
Universitatea Cluj	2020–21	Liga II	3	0	0	0	—		—		0	0	3	0
Cavalry FC	2021	Canadian Premier League	0	0	0	0	—		—		0	0	0	0
Career total			46	6	0	0	—		0	0	0	0	46	6
