= Julio Villalba =

Paraguayan footballer (born 1998)

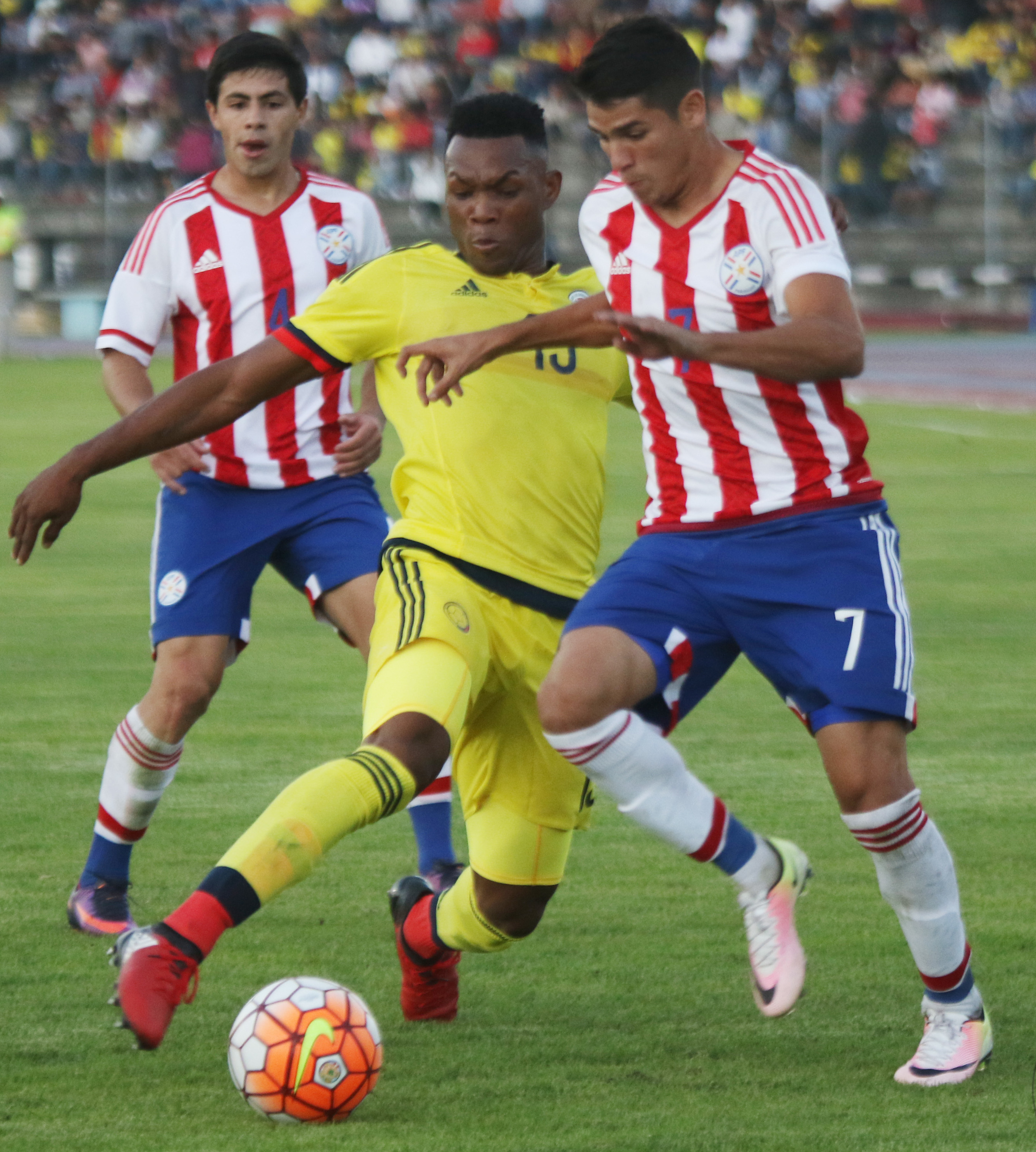
- Villalba playing for Paraguay U20 during the 2017 South American Youth Football Championship

Personal information
- Full name: Julio César Villalba Gaona
- Date of birth: 17 September 1998 (age 28)
- Place of birth: Ciudad del Este, Paraguay
- Height: 1.74 m (5 ft 9 in)
- Position: Forward

Team information
- Current team: Independiente
- Number: 9

Youth career
- –2016: Cerro Porteño

Senior career*
Years	Team	Apps	(Gls)
2016–2017	Cerro Porteño	16	(4)
2017–2021	Borussia Mönchengladbach	2	(1)
2017	→ Cerro Porteño (loan)	13	(2)
2020	→ SCR Altach (loan)	8	(0)
2021–2022	Guayaquil City	24	(1)
2022–2023	Sol de América	8	(0)
2023	Luqueño	1	(0)
2024–	Independiente	0	(0)

International career
2015	Paraguay U17	11	(2)
2016–2018	Paraguay U20	4	(1)
- * Club domestic league appearances and goals as of 26 October 2023

Julio César Villalba Gaona (born 17 September 1998) is a Paraguayan professional footballer who plays as a forward for Independiente.

== Club career ==
Villalba signed with Borussia Mönchengladbach in January 2017.

Upon returning to Paraguay, he featured for Cerro Porteño U20 in the 2016 U-20 Copa Libertadores.

He made his first-team debuts for Cerro Porteño during 2016 and the club will enjoy little of him before the player departs permanently to the Bundesliga.

On 8 January 2020, Villalba was sent on loan to SC Rheindorf Altach of the Austrian Bundesliga for the remainder of the season.

== International career ==
Villalba featured in Cerro Porteno's youth academy and Paraguay U17 alongside Sergio Díaz.

Villalba played at the 2015 South American Under-17 Football Championship, making 8 appearances.

He then featured at the 2015 FIFA U-17 World Cup making three appearances and scoring two goals against Syria U17 and France U17.
