= Estadio IV Centenario =

Multi-use stadium in Tarija, Bolivia

Coordinates: 21°31′56″S 64°43′28″W

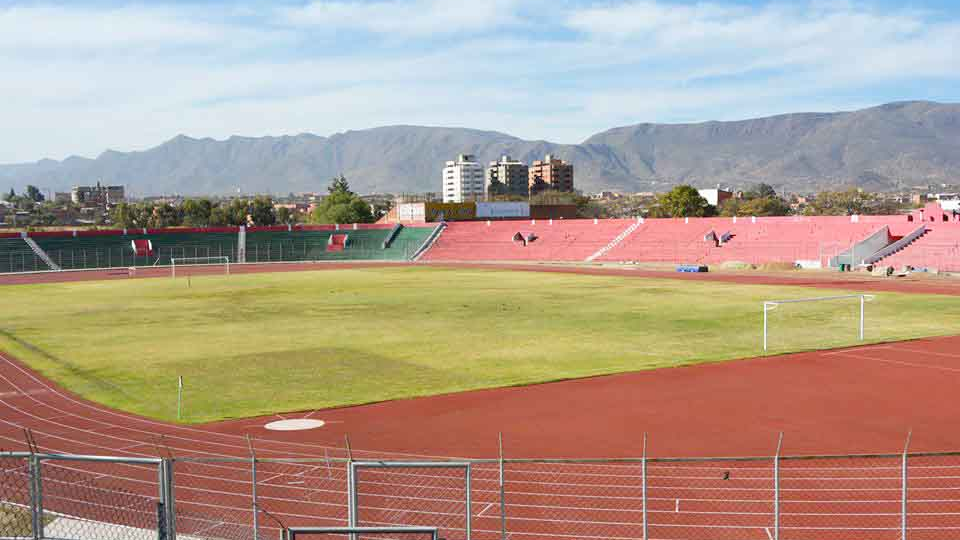
- Interactive map of Estadio IV Centenario
- Location: Tarija, Bolivia
- Elevation: 1,869 m (6,132 ft)
- Capacity: 16,586

Tenants
- Unión Central; Ciclón; Real Tomayapo; Bolivia national football team (selected matches)

Estadio IV Centenario is a multi-use stadium in Tarija, Bolivia. It is used mostly for football matches, on club level by Unión Central, Ciclón, and Real Tomayapo. The stadium was remodeled in 2024 from a capacity of 15,000 up to 16,586. It is located at 1,869 meters (6,132 feet) above sea level.
