= Estadio Bicentenario de La Florida =

Multi-purpose stadium in Santiago, Chile

Coordinates: 33°32′27″S 70°34′42″W

- La Florida Municipal Bicentennial Stadium
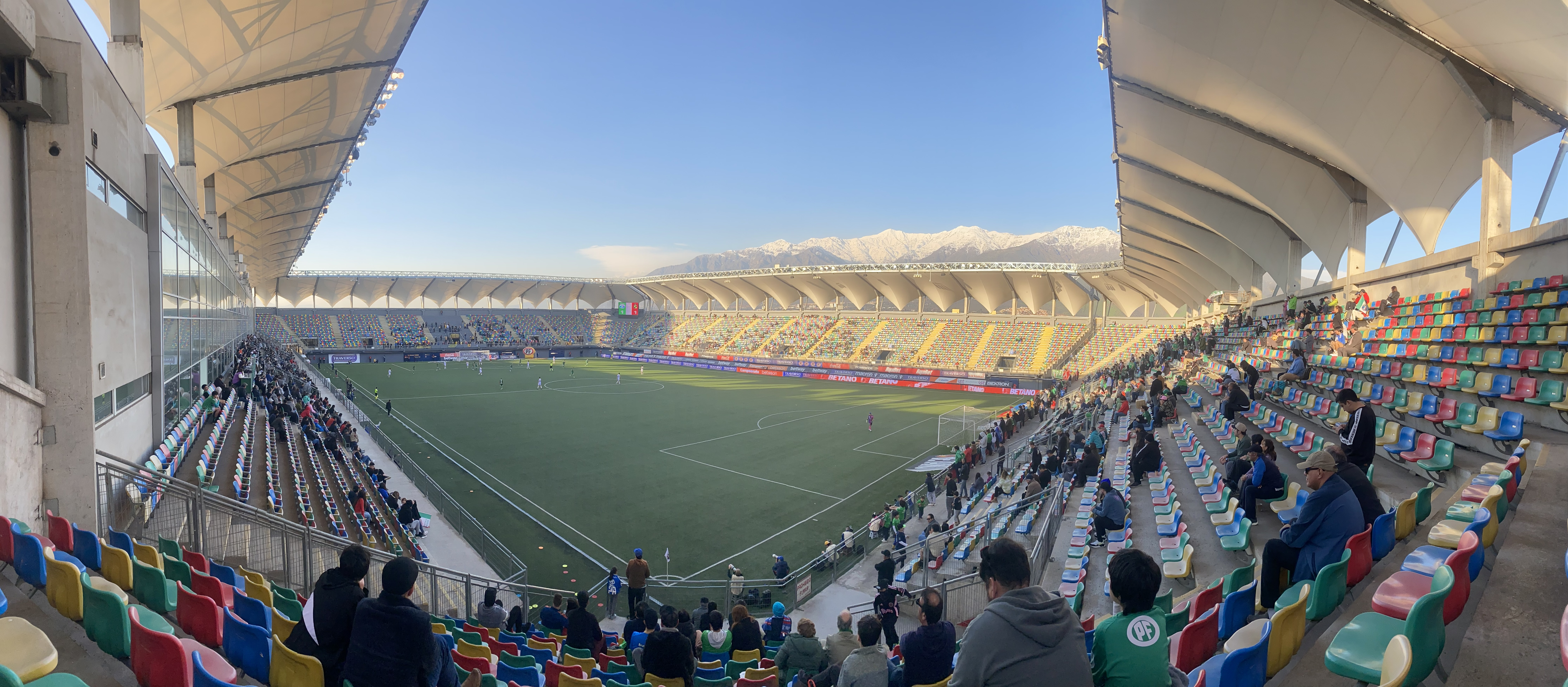
- The new stadium
- Interactive map of Estadio Bicentenario de La Florida
- Former names: Estadio Municipal de La Florida (1986—2008)
- Location: La Florida, Santiago, Chile
- Owner: Ilustre Municipalidad de la Florida
- Operator: Audax Italiano
- Capacity: 11,637 (football); 25,000 (concert)
- Surface: FieldTurf
- Field size: 105 x 68 m

Construction
- Opened: 1986 (old stadium); November 12, 2008 (new stadium)
- Renovated: January 28, 2008 to September 26, 2008
- Demolished: 2008 (old stadium)
- Cost: CLP $11,804,156,704
- Architects: Judson & Olivos Architects

Tenant
- Audax Italiano

Estadio Bicentenario Municipal de La Florida (in English: La Florida Municipal Bicentennial Stadium) is a multi-purpose stadium, located in La Florida, in eastern Santiago (Chile). It is the home stadium of the Chilean football team Audax Italiano. The stadium was built in 1986 and rebuilt in 2008.

The stadium also hosts a variety of events such as summer theatre festivals and music concerts, such as the Kiss concert in early 2009. Faith No More performed at the stadium on October 30, 2009, as part of their The Second Coming Tour. The stadium has also been used for concerts by Travis Scott, The Weeknd, System of a Down, Primus, Rage Against the Machine, The Mars Volta, The Black Eyed Peas, Green Day, Rammstein, Dua Lipa, Ed Sheeran, Harry Styles, Post Malone, Def Leppard and Mötley Crüe.

In 2007, La Florida was selected as a venue for the 2008 FIFA U-20 Women's World Cup. To comply with FIFA standards, the old stadium was torn down and an entirely new venue was built. The capacity of the latter was increased from 7000 to 12,000 people. The new stadium was inaugurated on November 12, 2008.

== Gallery ==
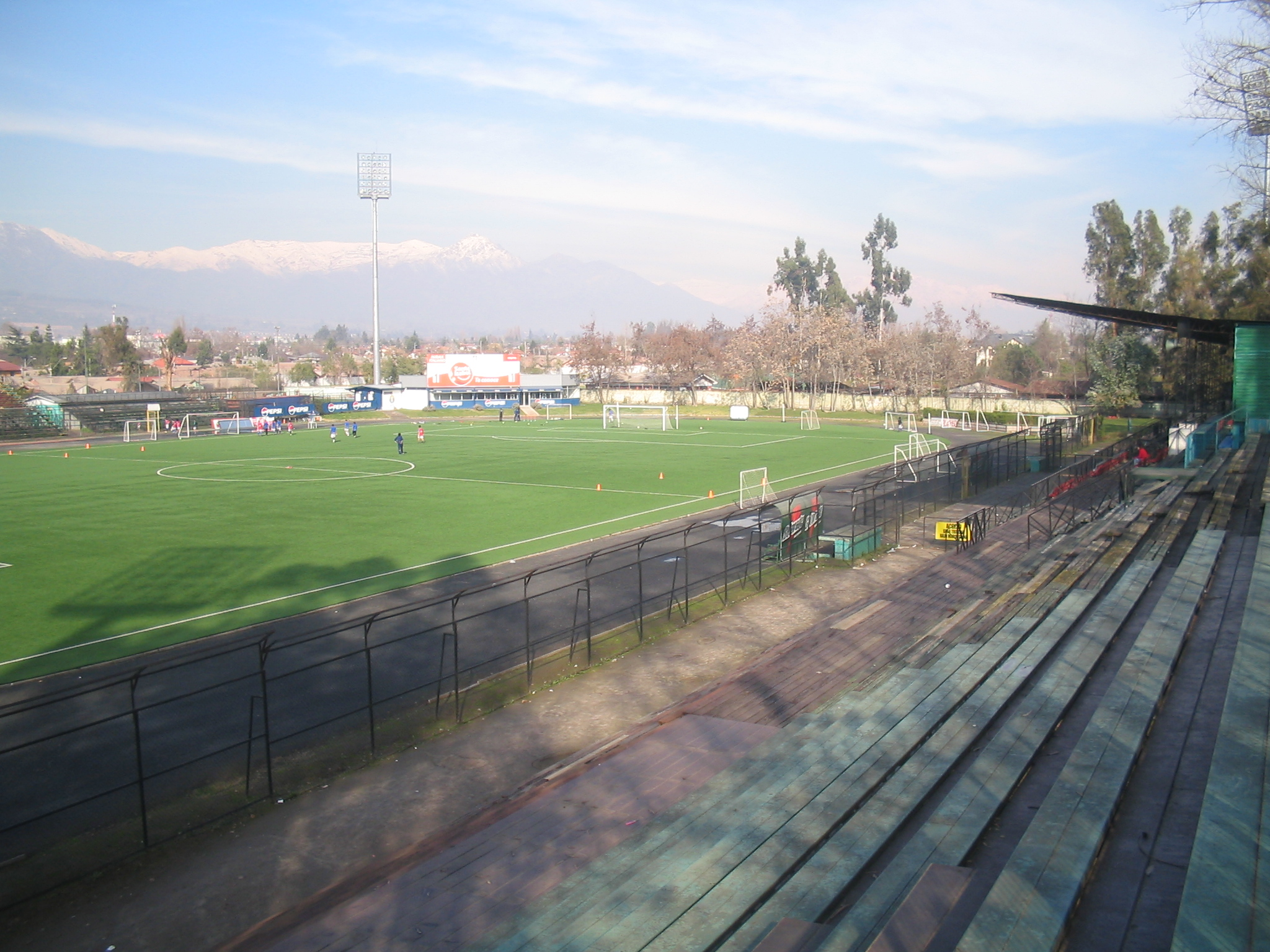
The stadium prior to renovation in 2007

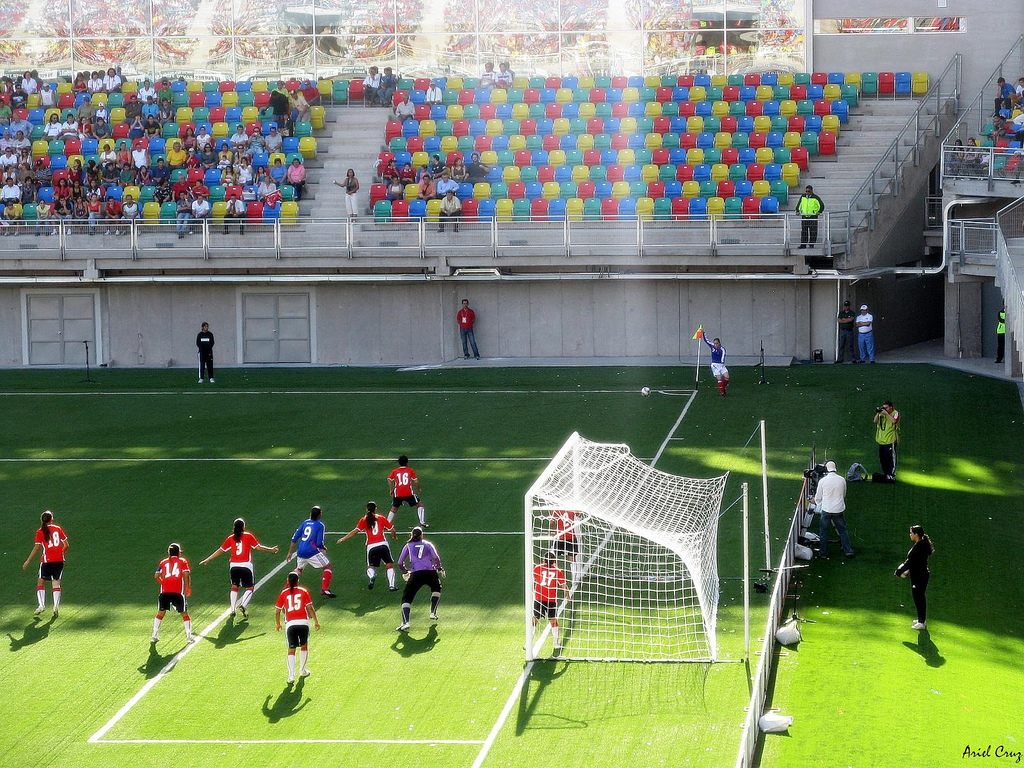
The stadium during the 2008 FIFA U-20 Women's World Cup

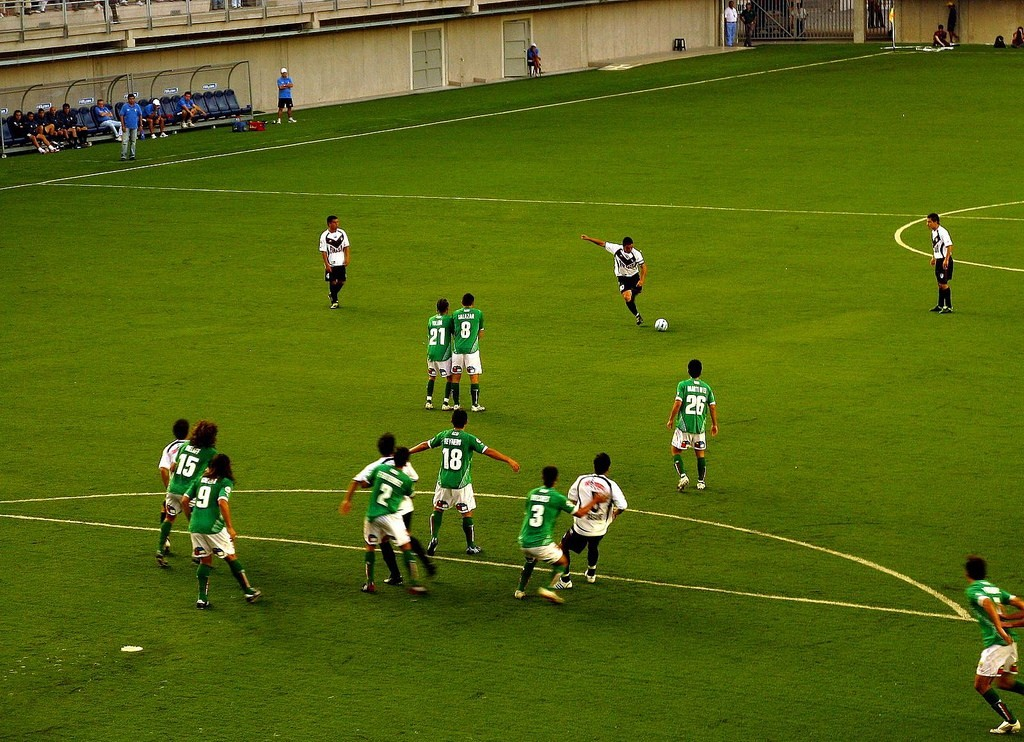
Audax Italiano vs Santiago Morning in 2009

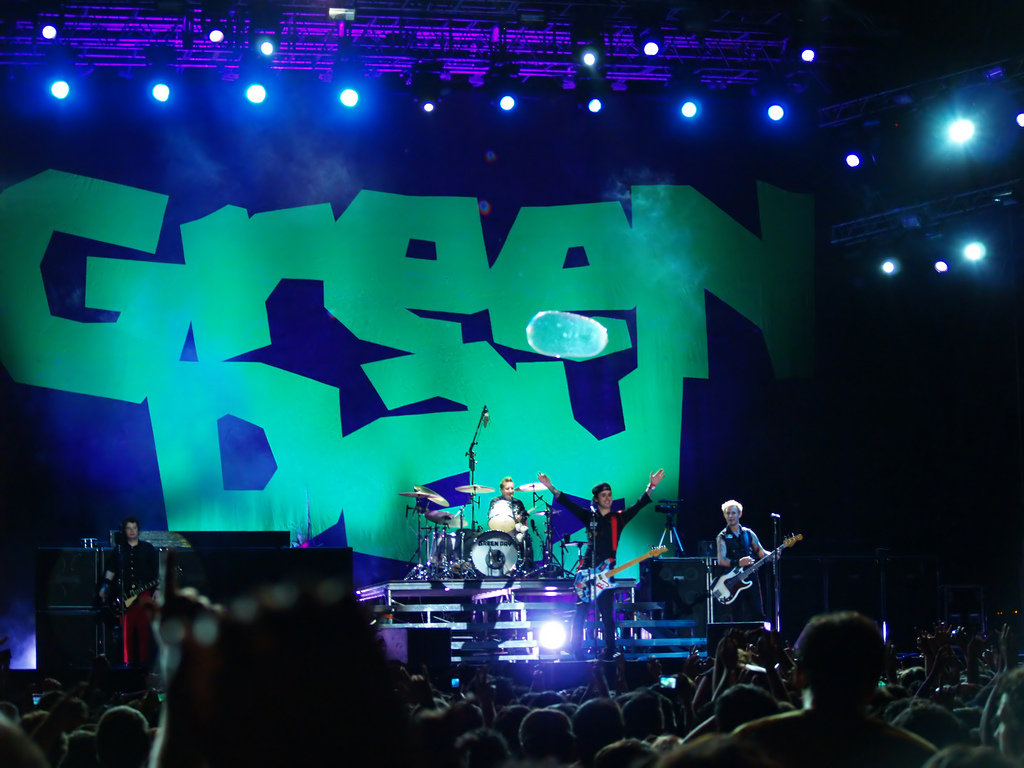
Green Day playing a concert at the stadium

Preceded by Lokomotiv Stadium; Moscow	FIFA U-20 Women's World Cup; Final Venue; 2008	Succeeded by Bielefelder Alm; Bielefeld
