= Edward Bolaños =

Colombian footballer (born 1998)

Personal information
- Full name: Edward Orlando Bolaños Angulo
- Date of birth: 14 August 1998 (age 28)
- Place of birth: Tumaco, Colombia
- Height: 1.84 m (6 ft 0 in)
- Position: Forward

Team information
- Current team: Naxxar Lions
- Number: 9

Youth career
- Estudiantil Medellín
- Rionegro Águilas
- 2017: → Rayo Vallecano (loan)

Senior career*
Years	Team	Apps	(Gls)
2017–2018	Rionegro Águilas	0	(0)
2017–2018	→ Rayo Vallecano B (loan)	34	(12)
2018–2021	Cortuluá	0	(0)
2018–2019	→ Ponferradina B (loan)	9	(5)
2019–2021	→ Ponferradina (loan)	15	(1)
2019–2020	→ Guijuelo (loan)	8	(0)
2020	→ Alcobendas (loan)	0	(0)
2021–2022	Patriotas	31	(4)
2023–2024	Club Atlético Alvarado	12	(0)
2024–2025	Nueva Santa Cruz FC		
2025–	Naxxar Lions	16	(4)
- * Club domestic league appearances and goals as of 6 October 2025

Edward Orlando Bolaños Angulo (born 14 August 1998) is a Colombian professional footballer who plays for Cortuluá as a forward for Maltese side Naxxar Lions.

== Club career ==
Born in Tumaco, Bolaños represented CD Estudiantil de Medellín and Rionegro Águilas as a youth. He moved to Spain in January 2017, after joining Rayo Vallecano's youth setup on loan.

Bolaños made his senior debut for Rayo's reserve team during the 2017–18 season, in Tercera División. On 20 August 2018, he joined Segunda División B side SD Ponferradina, on loan from Cortuluá; initially assigned to the B-team, he contributed with one goal in 14 appearances (play-offs included) as his side achieved promotion to Segunda División.

Bolaños spent the 2019–20 campaign on loan at CD Guijuelo in the third division and Fútbol Alcobendas Sport in the fourth division, but returned to Ponfe in June 2020, with his club extending his loan deal with Cortuluá for a further year.

Bolaños made his professional debut on 12 September 2020, coming on as a late substitute for Yuri de Souza in a 1–2 home loss against CD Castellón for the second division championship.
