= Federico Vietto =

Argentinian footballer

Personal information
- Full name: Federico Vietto
- Date of birth: 1 January 1998 (age 28)
- Place of birth: Balnearia, Argentina
- Height: 1.79 m (5 ft 10 in)
- Position: Forward

Team information
- Current team: Kerala Blasters FC
- Number: 9

Youth career
- Racing Club

Senior career*
Years	Team	Apps	(Gls)
2020–2022	Racing Club	0	(0)
2020	→ Patronato (loan)	2	(0)
2020–2021	→ Temperley (loan)	8	(1)
2021	→ Agropecuario (loan)	2	(0)
2023–	Guayaquil City	2	(1)

International career
2015	Argentina U17	1	(0)
- * Club domestic league appearances and goals as of 13:48, 7 April 2023 (UTC)

Federico "Fede" Vietto (born 1 January 1998) is an Argentine professional footballer who plays as a forward for Indian Super League in Kerala Blasters FC.

== Club career ==
On 19 June 2017, Vietto signed his first professional contract with Racing Club. On 12 January 2020, Vietto joined on loan Patronato. Vietto made his professional debut with Patronato in a 3-3 Argentine Primera División tie with Banfield on 26 January 2020.

In February 2023, Vietto joined Ecuadorian Serie A side Guayaquil City on a free transfer, signing a one-year deal.

== Personal life ==
Vietto is the brother of the footballer Luciano Vietto.
