= Luis Iberico =

Peruvian footballer (born 1998)

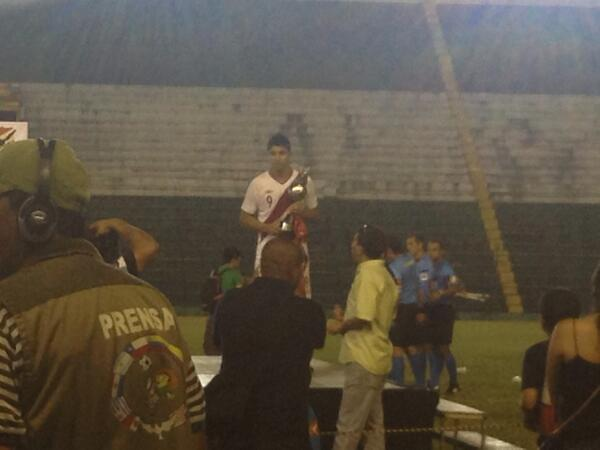

Personal information
- Full name: Luis Enrique Iberico Robalino
- Date of birth: 6 February 1998 (age 28)
- Place of birth: Lima, Peru
- Height: 1.77 m (5 ft 10 in)
- Position: Striker

Team information
- Current team: Sporting Cristal
- Number: 39

Youth career
- 2010–2014: Universidad San Martín

Senior career*
Years	Team	Apps	(Gls)
2014–2016	Universidad San Martín	39	(1)
2017–2023	Melgar	112	(31)
2020	→ UTC (loan)	23	(6)
2023–2024	Riga	27	(7)
2024–	Sporting Cristal	36	(13)

International career^{‡}
2013–2014	Peru U-15	8	(8)
2014–2016	Peru U-17	12	(9)
2014–2017	Peru U-20	13	(5)
2021–	Peru	7	(2)
- * Club domestic league appearances and goals as of 12 November 2026 ‡ National team caps and goals as of 16:52, 17 January 2022 (UTC)

Luis Enrique Iberico Robalino (born 6 February 1998) is a Peruvian professional footballer who plays as a striker for Peruvian Liga 1 club Sporting Cristal and the Peru national team.

== Club career ==
On 1 July 2023, Iberico signed for Latvian Higher League side Riga FC.

== International career ==
He made his debut for Peru national team on 8 June 2021 in a World Cup qualifier against Ecuador. He substituted Christian Cueva in the 79th minute.

== Career statistics ==
International goals by date, venue, cap, opponent, score, result and competition
No.	Date	Venue	Opponent	Score	Result	Tournament
1	20 January 2022	Estadio Nacional, Lima, Peru	Jamaica	1–0	3–0	Friendly
2	19 November 2022	Estadio Monumental Virgen de Chapi, Arequipa, Peru	Bolivia	1–0	1–0	Friendly

== Honours ==
Riga FC

- Latvian Football Cup: 2023

Sporting Cristal

- Copa de la Liga: 2026

Peru U15

- South American U-15 Championship: 2013

Individual

- 2021 Liga 1 top scorer: 12 goals
