= Peru national under-15 football team =

National association football team

Peru U-15
- Nickname(s): La Blanquirroja (The White and Red); Los Incas (The Incas)
- Association: Peruvian Football Federation
- Confederation: CONMEBOL (South America)
- Head coach: Diego Ortiz
- Home stadium: Estadio Nacional
- FIFA code: PER
First colours	Second colours

First international
- Peru 0–4 Paraguay (Ciudad del Este, Paraguay; September 11, 2004)

Biggest win
- Peru 12–0 Papua New Guinea (Baku, Azerbaijan; October 25, 2026)

Biggest defeat
- Peru 1–6 Brazil (Montería, Colombia; November 26, 2015)

FIFA U-15 World Cup & Festival
- Appearances: 1 (first in 2026)
- Best result: Round of 32 (2026)

South American U-15 Championship
- Appearances: 11 (first in 2004)
- Best result: Winners: 2013
Medal record
South American Championship
Gold medal – first place	2013 Bolivia	NA
Football at the Youth Olympic Games
Gold medal – first place	2014 Nanjing	NA

The Peru national under-15 football team, also known as Peru Under-15 or Peru U-15, represents Peru in association football at an under-15 age level and is controlled by the Peruvian Football Federation, the governing body for football in Peru.

== History ==
Coached by Juan José Oré, the U15 team won the 2013 South American championship, remaining undefeated throughout the competition. Moreover, striker Luis Iberico finished as the tournament's top scorer with 7 goals. In 2014, Peru won the gold medal at the Youth Olympic Games in Nanjing.

In 2026, Peru participated in the first-ever FIFA U-15 World Cup & Festival, held in Azerbaijan. Placed in Group O, the Peruvian team secured first place with four wins and one draw. They thus qualified for the tournament's round of 32, where they faced Italy, losing 3-4 in the penalty shootout after a 1–1 draw.

== Competitive record ==
=== FIFA U-15 World Cup & Festival ===
FIFA U-15 World Cup & Festival
Year	Round	PLD	W	D	L	GF	GA
(Azerbaijan) 2026	Round of 32	10	6	4	0	30	11
Total	Round of 32	10	6	4	0	30	11

=== South American U-15 Championship ===
South American U-15 Championship
Year	Round	PLD	W	D	L	GF	GA
(Paraguay) 2004	Quarter-final	4	1	1	2	1	5
(Bolivia) 2005	First stage	4	0	1	3	2	9
(Brazil) 2007	First stage	4	1	0	3	6	12
(Bolivia) 2009	First stage	4	0	1	3	3	9
(Uruguay) 2011	First stage	4	1	1	2	3	7
(Bolivia) 2013	Champions	6	5	1	0	14	5
(Colombia) 2015	First stage	4	1	0	3	4	14
(Argentina) 2017	Semi-final	6	2	2	2	9	11
(Paraguay) 2019	First stage	5	1	2	2	3	6
(Bolivia) 2023	First stage	4	1	0	3	2	8
(Paraguay) 2025	First stage	4	0	1	3	1	7
Total	Champions	49	13	10	26	48	93

=== Summer Youth Olympic Football Tournament ===
Football at the Summer Youth Olympics
Year	Round	PLD	W	D	L	GF	GA
(Singapore) 2010	Was not invited						
(China) 2014	Champions	4	4	0	0	10	4
Since 2018	Futsal tournament						
Total	Champions	4	4	0	0	10	4

== Coaching history ==
- (Peru) Óscar Hamada (2001)
- (Argentina) José Luis Pavoni (2004)
- (Peru) Juan José Oré (2005–2016)
- (Peru) Edgar Teixeira (2016–2019)
- (Peru) Pablo Zegarra (2023–2024)
- (Peru) Fernando del Solar (2025)
- (Peru) Diego Ortiz (2026–)

== Honours ==
South American U-15 Championship

- Winners (1): 2013

Youth Olympic Games

- Winners (1): 2014
