= Peru national under-17 football team =

National association football team

Peru
- Nickname(s): Los Jotitas (The Jotitas)
- Association: Peruvian Football Federation (FPF)
- Confederation: CONMEBOL (South America)
- Head coach: Renzo Revoredo
- Captain: Robinho Ormeño
- Home stadium: Estadio Nacional
- FIFA code: PER
First colours	Second colours

First international
- Peru 0-2 Colombia (Buenos Aires, Argentina; 1 April 1995)

Biggest win
- Peru 4–0 Venezuela (Asunción, Paraguay; 12 May 1991)

Biggest defeat
- Chile 5–0 Peru (Montería, Colombia; 31 March 2025)

FIFA U-17 World Cup
- Appearances: 2 (first in 2005)
- Best result: Quarter-finals (2007)

South American U-17 Championship
- Appearances: 21 (first in 1985)
- Best result: Fourth place (2007)
Medal record
Bolivarian Games
Gold medal – first place	2001 Ambato	NA
Silver medal – second place	1997 Arequipa	NA
Bronze medal – third place	2013 Trujillo	NA
Men's South American Games
Bronze medal – third place	1994 Valencia	NA

The Peru national under-17 football team represents Peru in international under-17 football competitions and is overseen by the Peruvian Football Federation.

They qualified for two World Cups, their best result being in 2007, when it reached the quarter-finals. The team's best result in the South American U-17 Championship was a fourth place finish in 2007.

== History ==
=== Two consecutive U-17 World Cups (2005-2007) ===
Named as host for the 2005 edition of the U-17 World Cup, Peru had players such as Christian Ramos, Carlos Zambrano, Josepmir Ballón, and Daniel Chávez, but it was eliminated with two losses and one draw; the only point earned came against Ghana at the Estadio Mansiche in Trujillo.

By finishing in fourth place at the 2007 South American U-17 Championship—a tournament in which playmaker Reimond Manco was named the best player—the Peruvian side, managed by Juan José Oré, qualified for their second World Cup, held in South Korea, by reaching the quarter-finals—a stage at which they were knocked out by Ghana, who won 2–0.

=== Missed opportunities in the 2019 and 2021 U-17 World Cups ===
Peru automatically qualified for the 2019 World Cup as host, but ended up without hosting rights on 22 February 2019 due to infrastructure concerns. Peru was forced to enter the run for the World Cup, which was moved to Brazil. Peru failed to qualify for the tournament, after only managed a lone 3–2 win over Uruguay, which was not enough compared to Ecuador's 4–1 win over eventual champions Argentina.

Peru automatically qualified for the 2021 World Cup as host, after being transferred as hosts from the 2019 FIFA U-17 World Cup. However, due to the COVID-19 pandemic, the tournament was moved to 2023. Due to Peru failing to meet infrastructure requirement, FIFA removed Peru as hosts and transferred it to Indonesia for the 2023 FIFA U-17 World Cup.

=== Bolivarian Games ===
Since 1993, the Bolivarian Games have been contested by U17 teams. Consequently, Peru's U17 squad won the gold medal at the 2001 edition in Ambato (Ecuador). This championship-winning team included players who would later go on to make a name for themselves with the senior national team, such as Paolo Guerrero, Jefferson Farfán and Alberto Rodríguez.

== Current squad ==
The following players were called up for the 2026 South American U-17 Championship.

No.	Pos.	Player	Date of birth (age)	Caps	Goals	Club
	GK	Daniel Recavarren	11 August 2009 (age 17)			(Peruvian Football Federation) Alianza Lima
	GK	Fernando Lasanta	14 September 2009 (age 17)			(Argentine Football Association) Vélez Sarsfield
	GK	Matteo Tassara	2 January 2009 (age 17)			(Italian Football Federation) Virtus Entella
	DF	Sebastián Ortega	12 February 2009 (age 17)			(Peruvian Football Federation) Alianza Lima
	DF	Alessandro Marsano	22 July 2009 (age 17)			(Peruvian Football Federation) Sporting Cristal
	DF	Ángel Villalta	1 July 2009 (age 17)			(Peruvian Football Federation) Sporting Cristal
	DF	Carlos Altez	24 May 2009 (age 17)			(Peruvian Football Federation) Sporting Cristal
	DF	Adriano Ortega	11 February 2009 (age 17)			(Peruvian Football Federation) Sporting Cristal
	DF	Fabio Vásquez	18 February 2009 (age 17)			(Peruvian Football Federation) Sporting Cristal
	DF	Jhairo Reyna	19 August 2009 (age 17)			(Peruvian Football Federation) UCV
	DF	Robert La Madrid	30 July 2009 (age 17)			(Peruvian Football Federation) Universitario
	DF	Cristóbal Gutiérrez	5 June 2009 (age 17)			(Peruvian Football Federation) Universitario
	DF	Dayron Castillo	9 May 2010 (age 16)			(Peruvian Football Federation) Universitario
	MF	Sean Gormley	13 March 2009 (age 17)			(United States Soccer Federation) Inter Miami
	MF	Franco Giambavichio	3 February 2009 (age 17)			(Italian Football Federation) Juventus FC
	MF	Robinho Ormeño (captain)	26 April 2009 (age 17)			(Peruvian Football Federation) Universitario
	MF	Rodrigo Vega	18 November 2009 (age 17)			(Peruvian Football Federation) USMP
	FW	Carlos Alvarado	7 January 2009 (age 17)			(Peruvian Football Federation) Alianza Lima
	FW	José Aranda	22 October 2009 (age 17)			(Peruvian Football Federation) Alianza Lima
	FW	Geray Motta	21 February 2009 (age 17)			(Peruvian Football Federation) Alianza Lima
	FW	Sandro Cometivos	16 May 2009 (age 17)			(Peruvian Football Federation) Universitario
	FW	Gonzalo Álvarez	26 June 2009 (age 17)			(Peruvian Football Federation) Universitario
	FW	Eysten Córdova	1 July 2009 (age 17)			(Peruvian Football Federation) Universitario

== Coaching history ==
Source consulted: RSSSF

- (Peru) Roberto Chale (1985)
- (Peru) Luis Cruzado (1986)
- (Peru) Ronald Pitot (1988)
- (Peru) Titín Drago (1991)
- (Peru) Alberto Gallardo (1993)
- (Peru) Hernán Saavedra (1995)
- (Peru) Titín Drago (1997)
- (Peru) Luis Bolaños Silva (1999)
- (Peru) César Gonzales (2001)
- (Peru) Óscar Hamada (2003)
- (Argentina) José Luis Pavoni (2004–2006)
- (Peru) Juan José Oré (2006–2012)
- (Peru) Edgar Teixeira (2012–2013)
- (Peru) Juan José Oré (2014–2018)
- (Peru) Carlos Silvestri (2018–2019)
- (Peru) Víctor Reyes (2020–2022)
- (Peru) Pablo Zegarra (2023–2024)
- (Peru) Carlos Silvestri (2025)
- (Peru) Renzo Revoredo (2025–)

== Competitive record ==
=== FIFA U-17 World Cup ===
FIFA U-17 World Cup record
Year	Round	Position	GP	W	D*	L	GS	GA
(China) 1985	Did not qualify							
(Canada) 1987	Did not qualify							
(Scotland) 1989	Did not qualify							
(Italy) 1991	Did not qualify							
(Japan) 1993	Did not qualify							
(Ecuador) 1995	Did not qualify							
(Egypt) 1997	Did not qualify							
(New Zealand) 1999	Did not qualify							
(Trinidad and Tobago) 2001	Did not qualify							
(Finland) 2003	Did not qualify							
(Peru) 2005	Group stage	13th	3	0	1	2	1	4
(South Korea) 2007	Quarter-finals	8th	5	2	2	1	3	3
(Nigeria) 2009	Did not qualify							
(Mexico) 2011	Did not qualify							
(United Arab Emirates) 2013	Did not qualify							
(Chile) 2015	Did not qualify							
(India) 2017	Did not qualify							
(Brazil) 2019	Did not qualify							
(Peru) ~~2021~~	Cancelled due to the COVID-19 pandemic							
(Indonesia) 2023	Did not qualify							
(Qatar) 2025	Did not qualify							
(Qatar) 2026	Did not qualify							
(Qatar) 2027	To be determined							
(Qatar) 2028	To be determined							
(Qatar) 2029	To be determined							
Total	Quarter-finals	2/21	8	2	3	3	4	7

FIFA U-17 World Cup matches
Year	Round	Score	Result
2005	Group stage	Peru 1–1 Ghana	Draw
2005	Group stage	Peru 0–1 China	Loss
2005	Group stage	Peru 0–2 Costa Rica	Loss
2007	Group stage	Peru 1–0 South Korea	Win
2007	Group stage	Peru 0–0 Togo	Draw
2007	Group stage	Peru 1–0 Costa Rica	Win
2007	Round of 16	Peru 1–1 Tajikistan	Draw
2007	Quarter-finals	Peru 0–2 Ghana	Loss

==== Head-to-head record ====
The following table shows Peru's head-to-head record in the FIFA U-17 World Cup.

Opponent	Pld	W	D	L	GF	GA	GD	Win %
China	1	0	0	1	0	1	−1	0.00
Costa Rica	2	1	0	1	1	2	−1	50.00
Ghana	2	0	1	1	1	3	−2	0.00
South Korea	1	1	0	0	1	0	+1	100.00
Tajikistan	1	0	1	0	1	1	+0	0.00
Togo	1	0	1	0	0	0	+0	0.00
Total	8	2	3	3	4	7	−3	25.00

=== South American U-17 Championship ===
South American U-17 Championship record
Year	Round	GP	W	D*	L	GS	GA
(Argentina) 1985	Seventh place	8	3	0	5	10	14
(Peru) 1986	Group stage	4	2	0	2	3	3
(Ecuador) 1988	Group stage	4	1	1	2	5	9
(Paraguay) 1991	Group stage	4	1	1	2	7	7
(Colombia) 1993	Group stage	4	1	1	2	3	7
(Peru) 1995	Group stage	3	0	1	2	4	7
(Paraguay) 1997	Group stage	4	0	1	3	2	6
(Uruguay) 1999	Group stage	4	1	1	2	2	6
(Peru) 2001	Group stage	4	1	1	2	8	8
(Bolivia) 2003	Group stage	4	0	2	2	2	7
(Venezuela) 2005	Group stage	4	1	0	3	5	12
(Ecuador) 2007	Fourth place	9	3	3	3	12	16
(Chile) 2009	Group stage	4	1	0	3	4	8
(Ecuador) 2011	Group stage	4	1	1	2	8	9
(Argentina) 2013	Sixth place	9	1	1	7	8	19
(Paraguay) 2015	Group stage	4	0	1	3	4	11
(Chile) 2017	Group stage	4	0	0	4	2	11
(Peru) 2019	Fifth place	9	3	4	2	11	9
(Ecuador) 2023	Group stage	4	0	1	3	1	9
(Colombia) 2025	Group stage	4	0	0	4	0	17
(Paraguay) 2026	Group stage	4	0	0	4	2	11
Total	Fourth place	102	20	20	62	103	205

=== Bolivarian Games ===
Bolivarian Games record
Year	Result	Pld	W	D	L	GF	GA
(Colombia) 1938	See A team						
From 1947 to 1981	Disputed by amateur teams						
(Ecuador) 1985	See U-20 team						
(Venezuela) 1989	No tournament held						
(Bolivia) 1993	Fourth place	4	1	1	2	4	9
(Peru) 1997	Silver medal	4	2	2	0	6	4
(Ecuador) 2001	Gold medal	4	2	1	1	8	8
(Colombia) 2005	Withdrew						
(Bolivia) 2009	Did not enter						
(Peru) 2013	Bronze medal	4	2	1	1	7	4
From 2017 to 2022	Did not enter						
From 2024 to 2025	No tournament held						
(Colombia) 2029	To be determined						
Total	Gold medal	16	7	5	4	25	25

=== South American Games ===
South American Games record
Year	Result	Pld	W	D	L	GF	GA
From 1978 to 1990	See U-20 team						
(Venezuela) 1994	Bronze medal	3	0	1	2	2	8
From 1998 to 2006	Futsal tournament						
(Colombia) 2010	Sixth place	4	0	2	2	6	10
(Chile) 2014	Fifth place	3	1	0	2	8	11
Since 2018	See U-20 team						
Total	Bronze medal	10	1	3	6	16	29

== Honours ==
- South American Games
  - (bronze) Bronze Medalists (1): 1994
- Bolivarian Games
  - (gold) Gold Medalists (1): 2001
  - (silver) Silver Medalists (1): 1997
  - (bronze) Bronze Medalists (1): 2013

== See also ==
- Peru national football team
- Federacion Peruana de Futbol
