= 2025 CONMEBOL Boys' U-15 Evolution League =

CONMEBOL Liga Evolución Sub 15 Paraguay 2025

Tournament details
- Host country: Paraguay
- Dates: 24 September – 6 October
- Teams: 10 (from 1 confederation)
- Venue: 1 (in 1 host city)

Final positions
- Champions: Brazil (1st title)
- Runners-up: Argentina
- Third place: Venezuela
- Fourth place: Uruguay

Tournament statistics
- Top scorer: (Argentina) Bruno Cabral (10 goals)

The 2025 CONMEBOL Boys' U-15 Evolution League (Spanish: CONMEBOL Liga Evolución Sub-15) is the 11th edition of the biennial international youth football championship organised by CONMEBOL for the men's under-15 national teams of South America, and the first under the new name CONMEBOL Boys' U-15 Evolution League. It was held in Luque, Paraguay from 24 September to 6 October 2025.

Starting with this edition, the tournament was renamed the CONMEBOL Boys' U-15 Evolution League and, together with the newly created CONMEBOL Girls' U-15 Evolution League, became part of the tournaments of the Evolution Program of the CONMEBOL Development Department. The tournament is a continuation of the former South American U-15 Championship.

Paraguay are the defending champions.

== Teams ==
All ten CONMEBOL member national teams entered the tournament.

Team	Appearance	Previous best top-4 performance
Argentina	11th	Champions (2017)
Bolivia	11th	Fourth place (2005)
Brazil	11th	Champions (2005, 2007, 2011, 2015, 2019)
Chile	11th	Fourth place (2007, 2013, 2023)
Colombia	11th	Runners-up (2004, 2011, 2013)
Ecuador	11th	Runners-up (2023)
Paraguay (holders, hosts)	11th	Champions (2004, 2009, 2023)
Peru	11th	Champions (2013)
Uruguay	11th	Runners-up (2007, 2015)
Venezuela	10th	None

== Venue ==
Luque	2025 CONMEBOL Boys' U-15 Evolution League is located in Paraguay
CARDIF	2025 CONMEBOL Boys' U-15 Evolution League is located in Paraguay
Capacity: ?	2025 CONMEBOL Boys' U-15 Evolution League is located in Paraguay

Paraguay hosted the tournament for the third time after the 2004 and 2019 editions. All matches were played at the Centro de Alto Rendimiento de las Divisiones Formativas (CARDIF) located within the Parque Olímpico sports complex in Luque and opened in April 2024..

== Competition format ==
South zone
Pos	Team
S1	Paraguay
S2	Argentina
S3	Uruguay
S4	Chile
S5	Bolivia

North zone
Pos	Team
N1	Ecuador
N2	Brazil
N3	Peru
N4	Venezuela
N5	Colombia

The teams were divided into two geographically based zones (North and South) to compete in a round robin against other members of their own zone during the group stage. In the final stage, the winners of each zone face each other in the final to contest the title, while the runners-up, third, fourth, and fifth place teams from each zone face each other to determine third through tenth place.

Each match had a regular playing time of 80 minutes divided into two 40-minute halves with a 15-minute break. At the end of each match, CONMEBOL implemented a third period in which members of both teams shared an educational and integration space before returning to the dressing rooms.

== Group stage ==
In the group stage, teams were ranked according to points earned (3 points for a win, 1 point for a draw, 0 points for a loss). If tied on points, tiebreakers would be applied in the following order:

1. Head-to-head result between tied teams;
  - Points in head-to-head matches among the tied teams;
  - Goal difference in head-to-head matches among the tied teams;
  - Goals scored in head-to-head matches among the tied teams;
2. Goal difference in all group matches;
3. Goals scored in all group matches;
4. Fewest red cards received;
5. Fewest yellow cards received;
6. Drawing of lots.

All match times are local times, PYT (UTC−3), as listed by CONMEBOL.

=== South zone ===
Pos	Team	Pld	W	D	L	GF	GA	GD	Pts	Qualification
1	Argentina	4	4	0	0	9	2	+7	12	Final
2	Uruguay	4	3	0	1	8	2	+6	9	Third place match
3	Paraguay (H)	4	1	1	2	3	4	−1	4	Fifth place match
4	Chile	4	0	2	2	3	5	−2	2	Seventh place match
5	Bolivia	4	0	1	3	1	11	−10	1	Ninth place match

Source: CONMEBOL
Rules for classification: Tiebreakers
(H) Hosts
24 September 2025
8:00

Bolivia	0–3	Argentina
	CONMEBOL report APF report	Cabral 25', 37', 75'

CARDIF, Luque
Referee: Fabio Villalba (Paraguay)
24 September 2025
10:30

Paraguay	0–1	Uruguay
	CONMEBOL report APF report	Rodríguez 70'

CARDIF Court 1, Luque
Referee: Jhonatan De Jesús (Paraguay)

26 September 2025
8:00

Paraguay	2–0	Bolivia
Penayo 6', 48'	CONMEBOL report APF report

CARDIF, Luque
Referee: Basilio Jara (Paraguay)
26 September 2025
10:30

Argentina	2–1	Chile
Cabral 30', 41'	CONMEBOL report APF report	Delgado 19'

CARDIF, Luque
Referee: Oscar Amarilla (Paraguay)

28 September 2025
8:00

Chile	0–1	Uruguay
	CONMEBOL report APF report	Pesce 11'

CARDIF, Luque
Referee: Gustavo Caballero (Paraguay)
28 September 2025
10:30

Argentina	2–0	Paraguay
González 48'; Cabral 76'	CONMEBOL report APF report

CARDIF Court 1, Luque
Referee: Carlos Figueredo (Paraguay)

2 October 2025
8:00

Uruguay	5–0	Bolivia
Azambuja 8'; Rodales 28'; Cardozo 58'; Pesce 62'; Soares de Lima 65'	CONMEBOL report APF report

CARDIF, Luque
Referee: Francisco Osorio (Paraguay)
2 October 2025
10:30

Chile	1–1	Paraguay
Riveros 16'	CONMEBOL report APF report	Paniagua 47'

CARDIF Court 1, Luque
Referee: Blas Medina (Paraguay)

4 October 2025
8:00

Bolivia	1–1	Chile
Sánchez 43'	CONMEBOL report APF report	Cáceres 80+2'

CARDIF, Luque
Referee: Pedro Baranda (Paraguay)
4 October 2025
10:30

Uruguay	1–2	Argentina
Pesce 23'	CONMEBOL report APF report	Cabral 32', 39'

CARDIF, Luque
Referee: Jonathan González (Paraguay)

=== North zone ===
Pos	Team	Pld	W	D	L	GF	GA	GD	Pts	Qualification
1	Brazil	4	2	2	0	8	5	+3	8	Final
2	Venezuela	4	2	2	0	5	2	+3	8	Third place match
3	Colombia	4	1	2	1	5	4	+1	5	Fifth place match
4	Ecuador	4	0	3	1	3	4	−1	3	Seventh place match
5	Peru	4	0	1	3	1	7	−6	1	Ninth place match

Source: CONMEBOL
Rules for classification: Tiebreakers
24 September 2025
15:00

Venezuela	2–0	Peru
López 44'; Gamboa 68'	CONMEBOL report APF report

CARDIF, Luque
Referee: Ángel Fleitas (Paraguay)
24 September 2025
17:30

Colombia	0–0	Ecuador
	CONMEBOL report APF report

CARDIF, Luque
Referee: Blas Medina (Paraguay)

26 September 2025
158:00

Colombia	1–2	Venezuela
Bernal 17'	CONMEBOL report APF report	Rentería 6' (o.g.); Gamboa 30'

CARDIF, Luque
Referee: Juan Jara (Paraguay)
26 September 2025
17:30

Peru	0–2	Brazil
	CONMEBOL report APF report	Rodrigo Jr 34'; Léo Rodrigues 73'

CARDIF, Luque
Referee: Gustavo Chamorro (Paraguay)

28 September 2025
15:00

Brazil	4–3	Ecuador
Geovane 37'; Myguel 38'; Henrique 54'; Caio 76'	CONMEBOL report APF report	Fragozo 25'; Poveda 53'; Mina 80'

CARDIF, Luque
Referee: Pedro Baranda (Paraguay)
28 September 2025
17:30

Peru	1–3	Colombia
Correa 41'	CONMEBOL report APF report	Rentería 26'; Arboleda 54'; Bacca 60'

CARDIF, Luque
Referee: José Franco (Paraguay)

2 October 2025
15:00

Ecuador	0–0	Venezuela
	CONMEBOL report APF report

CARDIF, Luque
Referee: Fabio Villalba (Paraguay)
2 October 2025
17:30

Brazil	1–1	Colombia
Ruan Pablo 24'	CONMEBOL report APF report	Viveros 60'

CARDIF, Luque
Referee: Basilio Jara (Paraguay)

4 October 2025
15:00

Venezuela	1–1	Brazil
Gamboa 19'	CONMEBOL report APF report	Figuera 80+3' (o.g.)

CARDIF, Luque
Referee: Juan Jara (Paraguay)
4 October 2025
17:30

Ecuador	0–0	Peru
	CONMEBOL report APF report

CARDIF, Luque
Referee: Federico Villalba (Paraguay)

== Final stage ==
=== Ninth place match ===
6 October 2025
8:00

Peru	1–1	Bolivia
Ríos 7'	CONMEBOL report APF report	Chávez 30'
Penalties
Correa (penalty missed); Relaiza (penalty scored); Tumay (penalty scored); Chuyes (penalty scored); Gael (penalty missed); Alejo (penalty missed); Armas (penalty scored); Guzmán (penalty scored)	5–4	(penalty missed) Pérez; (penalty scored) Cortez; (penalty scored) Choquevillca; (penalty missed) Romero; (penalty scored) Chávez; (penalty missed) Castro; (penalty scored) Uriona; (penalty missed) Peralta

CARDIF, Luque
Referee: Blas Medina (Paraguay)

=== Seventh place match ===
6 October 2025
8:00

Chile	2–1	Ecuador
Morales 49'; Riveros 63'	CONMEBOL report APF report	Muñoz 29'

CARDIF, Luque
Referee: Gustavo Coronel (Paraguay)

=== Fifth place match ===
6 October 2025
11:30

Colombia	1–0	Paraguay
Franco 81'	CONMEBOL report APF report

CARDIF, Luque
Referee: Juan Jara (Paraguay)

=== Third place match ===
6 October 2025
11:30

Venezuela	0–0	Uruguay
	CONMEBOL report APF report
Penalties
Gamboa (penalty scored); Noguera (penalty scored); García (penalty scored); Villarreal (penalty scored); Mendoza (penalty scored); López (penalty scored)	6–5	(penalty scored) Soares; (penalty scored) Azambuja; (penalty scored) Moliterno; (penalty scored) Rodríguez; (penalty scored) Cardozo; (penalty missed) Mora

CARDIF, Luque
Referee: Fabio Villalba (Paraguay)

=== Final ===
6 October 2025
15:00

Brazil	2–2	Argentina
Allan Santos 26'; Léo Rodrigues 53'	CONMEBOL report APF report	Cabral 47', 59'
Penalties
Lucas Lopes (penalty scored); Caio (penalty scored); Ruan Pablo (penalty scored); José Henrique (penalty scored); Jean Carlos (penalty scored)	5–4	(penalty scored) Amaya; (penalty scored) Ruiz Díaz; (penalty missed) González; (penalty scored) Pereira; (penalty scored) Cabral

CARDIF, Luque
Referee: Álvaro Giménez (Paraguay)
