= 2023 South American U-15 Championship =

2023 South American Under-15 Football Championship
CONMEBOL Sub 15 Bolivia 2023

Tournament details
- Host country: Bolivia
- Dates: 4–19 October 2024
- Teams: 10 (from 1 confederation)
- Venue: 1 (in 1 host city)

Final positions
- Champions: Paraguay (3rd title)
- Runners-up: Ecuador
- Third place: Argentina
- Fourth place: Chile

Tournament statistics
- Matches played: 24
- Goals scored: 66 (2.75 per match)
- Top scorer: (Chile) Zidane Yáñez (5 goals)

The 2023 South American U-15 Championship was the 10th edition of the South American U-15 Championship (Spanish: CONMEBOL Sudamericano Sub-15), the biennial international youth football championship organised by CONMEBOL for the men's under-15 national teams of South America. It was held in Santa Cruz de la Sierra, Bolivia between 4 and 19 October 2024.

The tournament was originally planned to be held between 17 November to 3 December 2023, but on 16 October 2023 CONMEBOL announced that it would be postponed to August–September 2024 due to unforeseen circumstances. The tournament was postponed for a second time on 30 August 2024, this time to be held in October 2024.

The South American U-15 Championship returns after 5 years because the COVID-19 pandemic forced CONMEBOL to cancel the tournament in 2021.

Brazil were the defending champions but failed to retain their title by being eliminated in the group stage. The final was contested by Paraguay and Ecuador, with the Paraguayans winning their third title after beating the Ecuadorians 4–3 on penalties. Argentina finished third after defeating Chile 2–1 in the play-off for third place.

== Teams ==
All ten CONMEBOL member national teams entered the tournament. After two editions with invited UEFA teams, the tournament will once again contested by South American teams only.

Team	Appearance	Previous best top-4 performance
Argentina	10th	Champions (2017)
Bolivia (hosts)	10th	Fourth place (2005)
Brazil (holders)	10th	Champions (2005, 2007, 2011, 2015, 2019)
Chile	10th	Fourth place (2007, 2013)
Colombia	10th	Runners-up (2004, 2011, 2013)
Ecuador	10th	Third place (2009)
Paraguay	10th	Champions (2004, 2009)
Peru	10th	Champions (2013)
Uruguay	10th	Runners-up (2007, 2015)
Venezuela	10th	None

=== Squads ===
Each team was required to register a squad of 22 players, including at least 3 goalkeepers. After the postponement of the tournament from 2023 to 2024, CONMEBOL decided to maintain the original age group of players, so this edition was an U16 tournament. Players born on or after 1 January 2008 were eligible to compete in the tournament.

== Venues ==
Santa Cruz	Location of host city.
Estadio Ramón Tahuichi Aguilera	Location of host city.
Capacity: 35,180	Location of host city.

Bolivia was named as host country of the tournament during the CONMEBOL Council meeting on 30 September 2022. This will be the fourth time that Bolivia host the tournament, having previously done so in 2005, 2009 and 2013. Bolivia was also initially selected to host the previous edition in 2019, however, the tournament had to be rescheduled in Paraguay as Bolivia was unable to host it due to the 2019 Bolivian protests.

Santa Cruz and Montero were initially considered as host cities with Estadio Ramón Tahuichi Aguilera and Estadio Gilberto Parada as venues. CONMEBOL later confirmed that the tournament would only be played in Santa Cruz, with Montero being ruled out.

== Match officials ==
On 18 September 2024, CONMEBOL announced a total of 11 referees and 22 assistant referees appointed for the tournament. The refereeing team for each match consisted of a main referee and his two assistants plus a fourth official.

- (Argentina) Nazareno Arasa
  - Assistants: Pablo Acevedo and Sebastián Osudar
- (Bolivia) Javier Revollo
  - Assistants: William Medina and Jesús Antelo
- (Brazil) Rodrigo de Lima
  - Assistants: Alex Ang and Thiago Farinha
- (Chile) Manuel Vergara and Claudio Díaz
  - Assistants: Alan Sandoval and Carlos Poblete
- (Colombia) José Ortiz
  - Assistants: Cristian Aguirre and Javier Patiño
- (Ecuador) Robert Carrera
  - Assistants: Mauricio Lozada and Alexis Acosta
- (Paraguay) Giancarlos Juliadoza
  - Assistants: Julio Aranda, José Villagra and Esteban Testta
- (Peru) Jordi Espinoza
  - Assistants: Diego Jaimes, José Castillo and Alberth Alarcón
- (Uruguay) Javier Feres
  - Assistants: Héctor Bergaló and Marcos Rosamen
- (Venezuela) Alejandro Velásquez
  - Assistants: José Martínez and Erizon Nieto

Note

1. ^{†} Non-FIFA referees.

== Draw ==
The draw of the tournament wIll be held on 12 September 2024, 12:00 PYT (UTC−4), at the CONMEBOL headquarters in Luque, Paraguay. The ten involved teams will be drawn into two groups of five. The hosts Bolivia and defending champions Brazil were seeded into Group A and Group B respectively and assigned to position 1 in their group, while the remaining teams were placed into four "pairing pots" according to their results in the 2019 South American U-15 Championship (shown in brackets).

Seeded	Pot 1	Pot 2	Pot 3	Pot 4
Bolivia (9) (Hosts, assigned to A1); Brazil (1) (Title holders, assigned to B1)	Argentina (2); Paraguay (3)	Colombia (4); Ecuador (5)	Venezuela (6); Peru (8)	Uruguay (10); Chile (11)

From each pot, the first team drawn was placed into Group A and the second team drawn was placed into Group B. In both groups, teams from pot 1 were allocated in position 2, teams from pot 2 in position 3, teams from pot 3 in position 4 and teams from pot 4 in position 5.

The draw resulted in the following groups:

Group A
Pos	Team
A1	Bolivia
A2	Paraguay
A3	Colombia
A4	Peru
A5	Chile

Group B
Pos	Team
B1	Brazil
B2	Argentina
B3	Ecuador
B4	Venezuela
B5	Uruguay

== Group stage ==
The top two teams in each group advanced to the final stage.

Tiebreakers

In the group stage, teams were ranked according to points earned (3 points for a win, 1 point for a draw, 0 points for a loss). If tied on points, tiebreakers would be applied in the following order (Regulations Article 20):

1. Head-to-head result between tied teams;
  - Points in head-to-head matches among the tied teams;
  - Goal difference in head-to-head matches among the tied teams;
  - Goals scored in head-to-head matches among the tied teams;
2. Goal difference in all group matches;
3. Goals scored in all group matches;
4. Fewest red cards received;
5. Fewest yellow cards received;
6. Drawing of lots.

All match times are local times, BOT (UTC−4), as listed by CONMEBOL.

=== Group A ===
Pos	Team	Pld	W	D	L	GF	GA	GD	Pts	Qualification
1	Chile	4	4	0	0	8	1	+7	12	Final stage
2	Paraguay	4	3	0	1	7	1	+6	9	Final stage
3	Colombia	4	1	0	3	4	4	0	3 (Note: Tied on head-to-head points. Head-to-head goal difference: Colombia +2, Bolivia 0, Peru −2.)	
4	Bolivia (H)	4	1	0	3	2	9	−7	3	
5	Peru	4	1	0	3	2	8	−6	3	

Source: CONMEBOL
Rules for classification: Tiebreakers
(H) Hosts
Notes:
4 October 2024
17:00

Chile	1–0	Colombia
Cuevas 33'	Report

Estadio Ramón Tahuichi Aguilera, Santa Cruz de la Sierra
Referee: Nazareno Arasa (Argentina)
4 October 2024
19:30

Bolivia	0–1	Peru
	Report	Meza 13'

Estadio Ramón Tahuichi Aguilera, Santa Cruz de la Sierra
Referee: Rodrigo de Lima (Brazil)

6 October 2019
17:00

Peru	0–2	Paraguay
	Report CONMEBOL; Report APF	Aranda 32', 38'

Estadio Ramón Tahuichi Aguilera, Santa Cruz de la Sierra
Referee: Javier Feres (Uruguay)
6 October 2019
19:30

Chile	3–0	Bolivia
Yáñez 14', 58'; Martínez 52' (pen.)	Report

Estadio Ramón Tahuichi Aguilera, Santa Cruz de la Sierra
Referee: Alejandro Velásquez (Venezuela)

8 October 2024
17:00

Peru	1–3	Chile
Vásquez 42'	Report	Yáñez 19', 55'; Cuevas 38'

Estadio Ramón Tahuichi Aguilera, Santa Cruz de la Sierra
Referee: Robert Cabrera (Ecuador)
8 October 2024
19:30

Paraguay	1–0	Colombia
Franco 63'	Report CONMEBOL; Report APF

Estadio Ramón Tahuichi Aguilera, Santa Cruz de la Sierra
Referee: Rodrigo de Lima (Brazil)

10 October 2019
17:00

Paraguay	0–1	Chile
	Report CONMEBOL; Report APF	Meneses 64'

Estadio Ramón Tahuichi Aguilera, Santa Cruz de la Sierra
Referee: Nazareno Arasa (Argentina)
10 October 2019
19:30

Colombia	1–2	Bolivia
Angulo 67'	Report	Maraude 13'; Barrios 33'

Estadio Ramón Tahuichi Aguilera, Santa Cruz de la Sierra
Referee: Javier Feres (Uruguay)

12 October 2019
17:00

Colombia	3–0	Peru
Angulo 38'; Londoño 40+2'; Sevillano 43'	Report

Estadio Ramón Tahuichi Aguilera, Santa Cruz de la Sierra
Referee: Alejandro Velásquez (Venezuela)
12 October 2019
19:30

Bolivia	0–4	Paraguay
	Report CONMEBOL; Report APF	De Carvalho 17'; Franco 41'; Ledesma 69', 78'

Estadio Ramón Tahuichi Aguilera, Santa Cruz de la Sierra
Referee: Rodrigo de Lima (Brazil)

=== Group B ===
Pos	Team	Pld	W	D	L	GF	GA	GD	Pts	Qualification
1	Argentina	4	2	2	0	6	4	+2	8	Final stage
2	Ecuador	4	1	2	1	5	8	−3	5 (Note: Head-to-head result: Ecuador 2–1 Brazil.)	Final stage
3	Brazil	4	1	2	1	7	5	+2	5	
4	Venezuela	4	1	1	2	7	7	0	4	
5	Uruguay	4	0	3	1	5	6	−1	3	

Source: CONMEBOL
Rules for classification: Tiebreakers
Notes:
5 October 2024
17:00

Uruguay	1–1	Ecuador
Azambuja 65'	Report	Angulo 69'

Estadio Ramón Tahuichi Aguilera, Santa Cruz de la Sierra
Referee: Giancarlos Juliadoza (Paraguay)
5 October 2024
19:30

Brazil	4–1	Venezuela
Tiago 2'; Davis 29' (o.g.); Dell 44', 46'	Report	Sulbarán 37'

Estadio Ramón Tahuichi Aguilera, Santa Cruz de la Sierra
Referee: Javier Revollo (Bolivia)

7 October 2024
17:00

Venezuela	0–1	Argentina
	Report	Silveira 49'

Estadio Ramón Tahuichi Aguilera, Santa Cruz de la Sierra
Referee: Jordi Espinoza (Peru)
7 October 2024
19:30

Uruguay	1–1	Brazil
Dos Santos 40+1'	Report	Ruan Pablo 53' (pen.)

Estadio Ramón Tahuichi Aguilera, Santa Cruz de la Sierra
Referee: Manuel Vergara (Chile)

9 October 2024
17:00

Venezuela	2–2	Uruguay
Sulbarán 28'; Berroterán 80+8'	Report	Martínez 80+1'; Pagano 80+4' (o.g.)

Estadio Ramón Tahuichi Aguilera, Santa Cruz de la Sierra
Referee: Javier Revollo (Bolivia)
9 October 2024
19:30

Argentina	2–2	Ecuador
De Martis 18' (pen.); Ojeda 56'	Report	Lerma 26' (pen.), 80+4'

Estadio Ramón Tahuichi Aguilera, Santa Cruz de la Sierra
Referee: José Ortiz (Colombia)

11 October 2024
17:00

Argentina	2–1	Uruguay
Jainikoski 31'; Yánez 65'	Report	Azambuja 20'

Estadio Ramón Tahuichi Aguilera, Santa Cruz de la Sierra
Referee: Giancarlos Juliadoza (Paraguay)
11 October 2024
19:30

Ecuador	2–1	Brazil
Angulo 11', 40'	Report	Ruan Pablo 28'

Estadio Ramón Tahuichi Aguilera, Santa Cruz de la Sierra
Referee: Jordi Espinoza (Peru)

13 October 2024
17:00

Ecuador	0–4	Venezuela
	Report	Berroterán 1'; García 17', 40'; Mancilla 52'

Estadio Ramón Tahuichi Aguilera, Santa Cruz de la Sierra
Referee: José Ortiz (Colombia)
13 October 2024
19:30

Brazil	1–1	Argentina
Wesley Natã 40+5'	Report	Esquivel 26'

Estadio Ramón Tahuichi Aguilera, Santa Cruz de la Sierra
Referee: Manuel Vergara (Chile)

== Final stage ==
The final stage was played on a single-elimination basis and consisted of the semi-finals, third place match and final. If a match was tied after 80 minutes, a penalty shoot-out was used to decide the winner (no extra time was played).

All match times are local times, BOT (UTC−4), as listed by CONMEBOL.

=== Bracket ===
The semi-finals matchups are:

- Semi-final 1 (SF1): Group A winners vs Group B runners-up
- Semi-final 2 (SF2): Group B winners vs Group A runners-up

Semi-finals
16 October – Santa Cruz de la Sierra
Chile	3 (3)
Ecuador (p)	3 (4)
16 October – Santa Cruz de la Sierra
Argentina	2 (3)
Paraguay (p)	2 (4)

Final
19 October – Santa Cruz de la Sierra
Ecuador	0 (3)
Paraguay (p)	0 (4)
Third place
19 October – Santa Cruz de la Sierra
Chile	1
Argentina	2

=== Semi-finals ===
16 October 2024
17:00

Chile	3–3	Ecuador
Martínez 33'; Orellana 37'; Silva 80+4'	Report	E. Quintero 10'; Lerma 40'; Angulo 45'
Penalties
Contreras (penalty missed); Torres (penalty scored); Ovando (penalty scored); Yáñez (penalty missed); Paris (penalty scored)	3–4	(penalty scored) Lerma; (penalty missed) Y. García; (penalty scored) Ordóñez; (penalty scored) F. Caicedo; (penalty scored) Pineda

Estadio Ramón Tahuichi Aguilera, Santa Cruz de la Sierra
Referee: Alejandro Velásquez (Venezuela)

16 October 2024
19:30

Argentina	2–2	Paraguay
De Martis 18'; Espíndola 40+2'	Report CONMEBOL; Report APF	Ledesma 27' (pen.); De Carvalho 55'
Penalties
Zalazar (penalty missed); Satas (penalty scored); Gómez (penalty scored); Baridó (penalty missed); Jainikoski (penalty scored)	3–4	(penalty missed) Zayas; (penalty scored) Freyres; (penalty scored) Alcaraz; (penalty scored) Cristaldo; (penalty scored) Coronel

Estadio Ramón Tahuichi Aguilera, Santa Cruz de la Sierra
Referee: José Ortiz (Colombia)

=== Third place match ===
19 October 2024
17:00

Chile	1–2	Argentina
Yáñez 45'		De Martis 16'; Pereyra 40+2'

Estadio Ramón Tahuichi Aguilera, Santa Cruz de la Sierra
Referee: Jordi Espinoza (Peru)

=== Final ===
19 October 2024
19:30

Ecuador	0–0	Paraguay
	Report CONMEBOL; Report APF
Penalties
Lerma (penalty scored); Dacosta (penalty scored); Ordóñez (penalty scored); H. Quintero (penalty missed); Y. García (penalty missed)	3–4	(penalty scored) De Carvalho; (penalty scored) Zayas; (penalty scored) Campss; (penalty scored) Cristaldo; (penalty missed) Franco

Estadio Ramón Tahuichi Aguilera, Santa Cruz de la Sierra
Referee: Rodrigo de Lima (Brazil)

== Goalscorers ==
There were 66 goals scored in 24 matches, for an average of 2.75 goals per match.

5 goals

- (Chile) Zidane Yáñez

4 goals

- (Ecuador) Riquelme Angulo

3 goals

- (Argentina) Thomas De Martis
- (Ecuador) Justin Lerma
- (Paraguay) Alan Ledesma
- (Uruguay) Nicolás Azambuja

2 goals

- (Brazil) Dell
- (Brazil) Ruan Pablo
- (Chile) Yastin Cuevas
- (Chile) Vicente Martínez
- (Colombia) Kevin Angulo
- (Paraguay) Thiago Aranda
- (Paraguay) Mauricio De Carvalho
- (Paraguay) Carlos Franco
- (Venezuela) Yimvert Berroterán
- (Venezuela) David García
- (Venezuela) Yerwin Sulbarán

1 goal

- (Argentina) Santiago Espíndola
- (Argentina) Felipe Esquivel
- (Argentina) Facundo Jainikoski
- (Argentina) Uriel Ojeda
- (Argentina) Lautaro Pereyra
- (Argentina) Santiago Silveira
- (Argentina) Thiago Yánez
- (Bolivia) Brayan Barrios
- (Bolivia) Jesús Maraude
- (Brazil) Tiago
- (Brazil) Wesley Natã
- (Chile) Joaquín Meneses
- (Chile) Matías Orellana
- (Chile) Agustín Silva
- (Colombia) Santiago Londoño
- (Colombia) Jhon Sevillano
- (Ecuador) Edwin Quintero
- (Peru) Samir Meza
- (Peru) Fabio Vásquez
- (Uruguay) Agustín Dos Santos
- (Uruguay) Facundo Martínez
- (Venezuela) John Mancilla

1 own goal

- (Venezuela) Román Davis (against Brazil)

== Final ranking ==
As per statistical convention in football, matches decided in extra time were counted as wins and losses, while matches decided by penalty shoot-out were counted as draws.

Pos	Team	Pld	W	D	L	GF	GA	GD	Pts	Final result
1st place, gold medalist(s)	Paraguay (C)	6	3	2	1	9	3	+6	11	Champions
2nd place, silver medalist(s)	Ecuador	6	1	4	1	8	11	−3	7	Runners-up
3rd place, bronze medalist(s)	Argentina	6	3	3	0	10	7	+3	12	Third place
4	Chile	6	4	1	1	12	6	+6	13	Fourth place
5	Brazil	4	1	2	1	7	5	+2	5	Eliminated in Group stage
6	Venezuela	4	1	1	2	7	7	0	4	Eliminated in Group stage
7	Colombia	4	1	0	3	4	4	0	3	Eliminated in Group stage
8	Uruguay	4	0	3	1	5	6	−1	3	Eliminated in Group stage
9	Peru	4	1	0	3	2	8	−6	3	Eliminated in Group stage
10	Bolivia (H)	4	1	0	3	2	9	−7	3	Eliminated in Group stage

Source: CONMEBOL
Rules for classification: For 5th to 10th place. 1) Points in group stage; 2) Goal difference; 3) Goals scored; 4) Fewest red cards received; 5) Fewest yellow cards received; 6) Drawing of lots (Regulations Article 22).
(C) Champions; (H) Hosts
