= 2013 Copa de México de Naciones =

Copa México de Naciones Sub-15

Tournament details
- Host country: Mexico
- Dates: 10 August – 18 August
- Teams: 12 (from 2 confederations)
- Venue: 3 (in 2 host cities)

Final positions
- Champions: Argentina (1st title)
- Runners-up: Uruguay
- Third place: United States
- Fourth place: Paraguay

Tournament statistics
- Matches played: 24
- Goals scored: 92 (3.83 per match)
- Top scorer(s): (United States) Joe Gallardo Jr (5 goals)
- Best player: (Uruguay) Diego Rossi
- Best goalkeeper: (Argentina) Franco Petroli

The 2013 Copa de México de Naciones is the 2nd edition of the Copa México de Naciones Sub-15 and it took place in Mexico from August 10 to August 18. The tournament is supposed to be the precursor the proposed U-15 FIFA World Cup. Twelve teams participated in this edition, four more than the 2013 edition.

The final match will be in the Estadio Azteca.

== Participating teams ==
- Mexico (host)
- Paraguay
- Canada
- Chile
- Colombia
- Costa Rica
- Panama
- Brazil
- Uruguay
- United States
- Argentina
- Cuba

== Group stage ==
The winners and runners-up from each group, as well as the best two third-placed teams, qualified for the quarter finals.

The ranking of each team in each group was determined as follows:

a) greatest number of points obtained in all group matches;
b) goal difference in all group matches;
c) greatest number of goals scored in all group matches.

Had two or more teams been equal on the basis of the above three criteria, their rankings would have been determined as follows:

d) greatest number of points obtained in the group matches between the teams concerned;
e) goal difference resulting from the group matches between the teams concerned;
f) greater number of goals scored in all group matches between the teams concerned;

=== Group A ===
Team	Pld	W	D	L	GF	GA	GD	Pts
Paraguay	3	2	0	1	7	4	+3	6
Chile	3	2	0	1	5	5	0	6
Mexico	3	1	0	2	9	5	+4	3
Canada	3	1	0	2	3	10	−7	3

10 August 2013
12:00

Paraguay	1-2	Canada
Baldisimo 61' (o.g)		Pena 61'; Norman 83' (pen.)

CECAP Cancha 2
Referee: Marco Antonio Hernandez Ramirez

10 August 2013
12:00

Mexico	1-2	Chile
Esquivel 43'		Alvarez 60'; Reyes 65' (pen.)

CECAP Cancha 1
Referee: Angel Flores Galicia

11 August 2013
12:00

Mexico	1–3	Paraguay
Godinez 31'		Ferreira 36', 46'; Martinez 71'

Cecap Cancha 1
Referee: Edgardo Espejo Tello

11 August 2013
12:00

Chile	2-1	Canada
Mell 67'; Soriano 75' (pen.)		Pena 6'

CECAP Cancha 2
Referee: Jesus Roberto Ruiz Gonzalez

12 August 2013
12:00

Mexico	7-0	Canada
Zamudio 13', 34', 54'; Marín 21', 57'; Leal 35'; Cruz 49'

CECAP Cancha 1
Referee: Brian Omar Gonzalez Veles

12 August 2013
12:00

Chile	1-3	Paraguay
Díaz 7'		Ferreira 25'; Martinez 36'; Diaz 64'

CECAP Cancha 2
Referee: Reinhold Enrique Ortiz Tienda

=== Group B ===
Team	Pld	W	D	L	GF	GA	GD	Pts
United States	3	2	0	1	7	2	+5	6
Uruguay	3	1	1	1	9	6	+3	4
Brazil	3	1	1	1	3	3	0	4
Panama	3	1	0	2	2	10	−8	3

10 August 2013
10:00

Brazil	1-0	United States
Olawale 66' (o.g.)		Pena 61'; Norman 83' (pen.)

CECAP Cancha 1
Referee: Reinhold Enrique Ortiz Tienda

10 August 2013
10:00

Uruguay	6-1	Panama
Schiappacasse 19', 45'; Rossi 22', 55'; Martinez 66', 73'		Alvarez 60'; Reyes 65' (pen.)

CECAP Cancha 2
Referee: Leopoldo Guerrero

11 August 2013
10:00

Brazil	2-2	Uruguay
Dinardi 8', 22'		Valverde 9'; Dinardi 55' (o.g.)

Cecap Cancha 1
Referee: Allan Morales

11 August 2013
10:00

United States	4-0	Panama
Perez 13'; Gallardo 29', 50'; Mate 31' (pen.)

CECAP Cancha 2
Referee: Aldo Cano Martinez

12 August 2013
10:00

United States	3-1	Uruguay
Gallardo 44', 61'; Wright 67'		Varela 70'

CECAP Cancha 2
Referee: Oscar Mejia Garcia

12 August 2013
10:00

Brazil	0-1	Panama
		Asprilla 25'

CECAP Cancha 1
Referee: Alfonso Caceres Hernandez

=== Group C ===
Team	Pld	W	D	L	GF	GA	GD	Pts
Colombia	3	3	0	0	14	2	+12	9
Argentina	3	1	1	1	6	4	+2	4
Costa Rica	3	1	1	1	4	4	0	4
Cuba	3	0	0	3	1	15	−14	0

10 August 2013
10:00

Argentina	1-1	Costa Rica
Bautista 25'		Contreras 37'

CAR Cancha 1
Referee: Ricardo Espinoza

10 August 2013
12:00

Colombia	8-1	Cuba
Marimon 8'; Ariza 13'; Bolanos 10', 34', 35', 46'; Blanco 30' (o.g.); Gonzalez 65'		Diaz 60'

CAR Cancha 1
Referee: Leopoldo Guerrero

11 August 2013
12:00

Costa Rica	2-0	Cuba
Martinez 20'; Hernandez 64'

CAR Cancha 1
Referee: Alberto Vazquez

11 August 2013
10:00

Argentina	0-3	Colombia
		Arango 10', 29'; Cetre 24'

CAR Cancha 1
Referee: Michel Caballero

12 August 2013
11:00

Argentina	5-0	Cuba
Conechny 9'; Vietto 55'; Olivera 60'; Ramos 66', 68'

CAR Cancha 1
Referee: Antonio Contrera

12 August 2013
13:00

Costa Rica	1-3	Colombia
Ramirez 42'		Perez 22'; Cuellar 44'; Calero 59'

CAR Cancha 1
Referee: Alfonso Caceres Hernandez

=== Ranking of third-placed teams ===
The two best teams among those ranked third were determined as follows:

1. points obtained in all group matches;
2. goal difference in all group matches;
3. number of goals scored in all group matches;

Grp	Team	Pld	W	D	L	GF	GA	GD	Pts
C	Costa Rica	3	1	1	1	4	4	0	4
F	Brazil	3	1	1	1	3	3	0	4
D	Mexico	3	1	0	2	9	5	+4	3

== Knockout stage ==
In the knockout stages, if a match is level at the end of normal playing time a kicks from the penalty mark to determine the winner.

Quarter-finals
14 August — CECAP
United States	1
Costa Rica	0
14 August — CECAP
Colombia	3 (3)
Uruguay (pen.)	3 (4)
14 August — CECAP
Paraguay (pen.)	1 (4)
Brazil	1 (2)
14 August — CECAP
Chile	1 (2)
Argentina (pen.)	1 (3)

Semi-finals
16 August — CECAP
United States	0
Uruguay	2
16 August — CECAP
Paraguay	0
Argentina	2

Final
18 August— Mexico City
Uruguay	0
Argentina	1
Third place
18 August— Mexico City
United States	3 (7)
Paraguay	3 (6)

=== Quarterfinals ===
14 August 2013
10:00

United States	1–0	Costa Rica
Gallardo 43'

CECAP Cancha 1
Referee: Leopoldo Guerrero

14 August 2013
10:00

Colombia	3-3	Uruguay
Marimon 14'; Cetre 16'; Arango 26'		Martinez 39'; Varela 52'; Ramirez 59'
Penalties
	3–4

CECAP Cancha 2
Attendance: 7,035
Referee: Enrique Ortiz

14 August 2013
12:00

Paraguay	1-1	Brazil
Martinez 23'		Dinardi 37'
Penalties
	4-2

CECAP Cancha 1
Referee: Aldo Cano

14 August 2013
12:00

Chile	1-1	Argentina
Pinto 40'	Report	Vietto 22'
Penalties
	2-3

CECAP Cancha 2
Referee: Omar Gonzalez

=== Semifinals ===
16 August 2013
10:00

United States	0-2	Uruguay
		Ibanez 42'; Rossi 67'

CECAP Cancha 1
Referee: Aldo Cano

16 August 2013
12:00

Paraguay	0-2	Argentina
		Federico Vietto 25' (38)

CECAP Cancha 1
Referee: Antonio Hernandez

=== Third place match ===
18 August 2013
10:00

United States	3-3	Paraguay
Wright 14', 71'; Saavedra 41'		Diaz 38'; Lopez 44'; Valiente 49'
Penalties
	7-6

Estadio Azteca, Mexico City
Referee: Baruch Castellanos

=== Final ===
18 August 2013
12:00

Uruguay	0-1	Argentina
		Tomás Conechny 31'

Estadio Azteca, Mexico City
Referee: Miguel Alaya

2013 Copa Mexico de Naciones winners

Argentina
1st title

== Top Goalscorers ==
Rank	Name	Goals
1	(United States) Joe Gallardo Jr	5
2	(Colombia) Orlando Bolanos	4
2	(Mexico) Claudio Zamudio	4
2	(Argentina) Federico Vietto	4
3	(Uruguay) Alejandro Martinez	3
3	(Uruguay) Martin Rossi	3
3	(Colombia) Wilmar Arango	3
3	(Brazil) Xavier Dinardi	3
3	(Paraguay) Javier Martinez	3
