= 2019 South American U-15 Championship =

2019 South American Under-15 Football Championship
CONMEBOL Campeonato Sudamericano Sub-15 Paraguay 2019

Tournament details
- Host country: Paraguay
- Dates: 23 November – 8 December
- Teams: 12 (from 2 confederations)
- Venues: 5 (in 3 host cities)

Final positions
- Champions: Brazil (5th title)
- Runners-up: Argentina
- Third place: Paraguay
- Fourth place: Colombia

Tournament statistics
- Matches played: 29
- Goals scored: 78 (2.69 per match)
- Top scorer: (Colombia) Ricardo Caraballo (7 goals)

The 2019 South American Under-15 Football Championship was the 9th edition of the South American Under-15 Football Championship, the biennial international youth football championship organised by the CONMEBOL for the men's under-15 national teams of South America. The tournament was originally to be held in Bolivia between 23 November and 8 December 2019. However, on 8 November 2019, CONMEBOL announced the tournament would be moved to Paraguay due to the 2019 Bolivian protests.

The defending champions are Argentina.

== Teams ==
All ten CONMEBOL member national teams entered the tournament. Moreover, two teams from UEFA will be invited to compete.

| Team | Appearance | Previous best top-4 performance |
|---|---|---|
| Argentina (holders) | 9th | Champions (2017) |
| Belgium (invitee) | 1st | None |
| Bolivia | 9th | Fourth place (2005) |
| Brazil | 9th | Champions (2005, 2007, 2011, 2015) |
| Chile | 9th | Fourth place (2007, 2013) |
| Colombia | 9th | Runners-up (2004, 2011, 2013) |
| Ecuador | 9th | Third place (2009) |
| Paraguay (hosts) | 9th | Champions (2004, 2009) |
| Peru | 9th | Champions (2013) |
| Poland (invitee) | 1st | None |
| Uruguay | 9th | Runners-up (2007, 2015) |
| Venezuela | 9th | None |

== Venues ==
| Asunción | | 2019 South American U-15 Championship is located in Paraguay |
|---|---|---|
| Estadio Arsenio Erico | Estadio Defensores del Chaco | 2019 South American U-15 Championship is located in Paraguay |
| Capacity: 5,000 | Capacity: 42,000 | 2019 South American U-15 Championship is located in Paraguay |
| Luque | | Villa Elisa |
| Cancha CONMEBOL | Estadio Adrián Jara | Estadio Luis Alfonso Giagni |
| Capacity: ? | Capacity: 4,000 | Capacity: 11,000 |

Initially, Bolivia was designated as host of the tournament at the CONMEBOL Council meeting held on 14 August 2018 in Luque, Paraguay. Estadio Ramón Tahuichi Aguilera in Santa Cruz de la Sierra and Estadio Samuel Vaca Jiménez in Warnes had been chosen as the venues. However, due to the 2019 Bolivian protests, on 8 November 2019 CONMEBOL moved the tournament to Asunción, Paraguay.

The new venues were announced on 19 November 2019. Four stadiums in 3 cities were chosen, Cancha CONMEBOL and Estadio Adrián Jara in Luque, Estadio Arsenio Erico in Asunción and Estadio Luis Alfonso Giagni in Villa Elisa. The Estadio Defensores del Chaco was added as venue for the final matchday (third place match and final).

== Draw ==
The draw of the tournament was held on 22 October 2019, 19:00 BOT (UTC−4), in Santa Cruz de la Sierra, Bolivia. The twelve involved teams were drawn into two groups of six. The original hosts Bolivia and the defending champions Argentina were seeded into Group A and Group B respectively and assigned to position 1 within their group, the remaining 8 CONMEBOL teams were placed into four "pairing pots" according to their final positions in the 2017 South American U-15 Championship (shown in brackets) and the two guests UEFA teams (Belgium and Poland) were placed in a last fifth pot.

| Seeded | Pot 1 | Pot 2 | Pot 3 | Pot 4 | Pot 5 |
|---|---|---|---|---|---|
| Bolivia (10) (Original hosts, assigned to A1); Argentina (1) (Title holders, assigned to B1) | Brazil (2); Paraguay (3) | Peru (4); Chile (5) | Ecuador (6); Colombia (7) | Uruguay (8); Venezuela (9) | Belgium; Poland |

The draw was led by Hugo Figueredo, competition director of CONMEBOL, who had the collaboration of Colombian coach Francisco Maturana and Juan Manuel Peña, former member of the Bolivia national football team.

== Match officials ==
The referees and assistants referees were:

- (Argentina) Nicolás Lamolina
  - Assistants: Pablo González and Facundo Rodríguez
- (Bolivia) Jordy Alemán
  - Assistants: Carlos Tapia and Rubén Flores
- (Brazil) Flavio Rodríguez De Souza
  - Assistants: Alessandro Rocha and Rafael Da Silva
- (Chile) Angelo Hermosilla
  - Assistants: José Retamal and Edson Cisternas
- (Colombia) Jhon Ospina
  - Assistants: Miguel Roldán and John Gallego
- (Ecuador) Franklin Congo
  - Assistants: Juan Rafael Aguiar and Dennys Guerrero
- (Paraguay) José Méndez
  - Assistants: Ródney Aquino and José Cuevas
- (Peru) Kevin Ortega
  - Assistants: Raúl López and Stephen Atoche
- (Uruguay) Andrés Matonte
  - Assistants: Santiago Fernández and Agustín Berisso
- (Venezuela) Orlando Bracamonte
  - Assistants: José Ponte and Francheskoly Chacón

Support Referees

- (Colombia) Santiago Bismarks
- (Ecuador) Augusto Aragón

== Group stage ==
The top two teams of each group advance to the semi-finals.

All times are local, PYT (UTC−3).

As a result of the change of host, the matches of Paraguay will be played on the last turn of each matchday of group B.

=== Group A ===
| Pos | Team | Pld | W | D | L | GF | GA | GD | Pts | Qualification |
|---|---|---|---|---|---|---|---|---|---|---|
| 1 | Brazil | 5 | 3 | 1 | 1 | 13 | 4 | +9 | 10 | Knockout stage |
| 2 | Colombia | 5 | 3 | 1 | 1 | 9 | 3 | +6 | 10 | Knockout stage |
| 3 | Venezuela | 5 | 1 | 3 | 1 | 4 | 4 | 0 | 6 | |
| 4 | Belgium (G) | 5 | 2 | 0 | 3 | 5 | 10 | −5 | 6 | |
| 5 | Peru | 5 | 1 | 2 | 2 | 3 | 6 | −3 | 5 | |
| 6 | Bolivia | 5 | 1 | 1 | 3 | 2 | 9 | −7 | 4 | |

Source: CONMEBOL
Rules for classification: Group stage tiebreakers
(G) Guests
23 November 2019
18:00

| Colombia | 1–1 | Venezuela |
|---|---|---|
| Girado 57' (pen.) | Report | Rojas 71' |

Estadio Adrián Jara, Luque
Referee: Andrés Matonte (Uruguay)
23 November 2019
19:00

| Brazil | 6–0 | Belgium |
|---|---|---|
| Robinho 10'; Nascimento 19', 50'; Andrey 16', 53'; Sávio 41' | Report |

Cancha CONMEBOL, Luque
Referee: José Méndez (Paraguay)
23 November 2019
20:30

| Bolivia | 0–0 | Peru |
|---|---|---|
| | Report |

Estadio Adrián Jara, Luque
Referee: Angelo Hermosilla (Chile)

25 November 2019
18:00

| Belgium | 2–1 | Peru |
|---|---|---|
| Kuavita 23'; Camara 52' (pen.) | Report | Tandazo 80' |

Estadio Adrián Jara, Luque
Referee: Augusto Aragón (Ecuador)
25 November 2019
19:00

| Venezuela | 1–1 | Brazil |
|---|---|---|
| Granadino 9' | Report | Nascimento 19' |

Cancha CONMEBOL, Luque
Referee: Franklin Congo (Ecuador)
25 November 2019
20:30

| Bolivia | 0–3 | Colombia |
|---|---|---|
| | Report | Girado 19'; Caraballo 65'; Díaz 85' |

Estadio Adrián Jara, Luque
Referee: Nicolás Lamolina (Argentina)

27 November 2019
18:00

| Peru | 2–1 | Colombia |
|---|---|---|
| del Castillo 32'; Díaz 41' | Report | Caraballo 45' (pen.) |

Estadio Adrián Jara, Luque
Referee: José Méndez (Paraguay)
27 November 2019
19:00

| Belgium | 2–0 | Venezuela |
|---|---|---|
| Camara 28'; Granadino 77' (o.g.) | Report |

Cancha CONMEBOL, Luque
Referee: Nicolás Lamolina (Argentina)
27 November 2019
20:30

| Bolivia | 0–3 | Brazil |
|---|---|---|
| | Report | Sávio 26'; Robinho 28', 78' |

Estadio Adrián Jara, Luque
Referee: Andrés Matonte (Uruguay)

29 November 2019
18:00

| Colombia | 1–0 | Belgium |
|---|---|---|
| Caraballo 16' | Report |

Estadio Adrián Jara, Luque
Referee: Franklin Congo (Ecuador)
29 November 2019
19:00

| Peru | 0–3 | Brazil |
|---|---|---|
| | Report | Nascimento 15'; Sávio 20', 45' |

Cancha CONMEBOL, Luque
Referee: Angelo Hermosilla (Chile)
29 November 2019
20:30

| Bolivia | 0–2 | Venezuela |
|---|---|---|
| | Report | Custodio 61'; Teguez 80' |

Estadio Adrián Jara, Luque
Referee: Augusto Aragón (Ecuador)

1 December 2019
18:00

| Venezuela | 0–0 | Peru |
|---|---|---|
| | Report |

Estadio Adrián Jara, Luque
Referee: José Méndez (Paraguay)
1 December 2019
19:00

| Brazil | 0–3 | Colombia |
|---|---|---|
| | Report | Villalobos 25'; Caraballo 29' (pen.), 59' |

Cancha CONMEBOL, Luque
Referee: Nicolás Lamolina (Argentina)
1 December 2019
20:30

| Bolivia | 2–1 | Belgium |
|---|---|---|
| Alcón 29' (pen.), 54' | Report | El Khannous 68' (pen.) |

Estadio Adrián Jara, Luque
Referee: Angelo Hermosilla (Chile)

=== Group B ===
| Pos | Team | Pld | W | D | L | GF | GA | GD | Pts | Qualification |
|---|---|---|---|---|---|---|---|---|---|---|
| 1 | Argentina | 4 | 2 | 2 | 0 | 9 | 1 | +8 | 8 | Knockout stage |
| 2 | Paraguay (H) | 4 | 1 | 3 | 0 | 5 | 3 | +2 | 6 | Knockout stage |
| 3 | Ecuador | 4 | 1 | 3 | 0 | 5 | 4 | +1 | 6 | |
| 4 | Uruguay | 4 | 1 | 0 | 3 | 6 | 9 | −3 | 3 | |
| 5 | Chile | 4 | 0 | 2 | 2 | 4 | 12 | −8 | 2 | |
| 6 | Poland (G, W) | 0 | 0 | 0 | 0 | 0 | 0 | 0 | 0 | Withdrew from the tournament. (Note: On 13 November 2019, the Polish Football Association (PZPN) announced that its team would not participate due to Bolivia's unstable social and political situation and despite the fact that the tournament was moved to Paraguay.) |

Source: CONMEBOL
Rules for classification: Group stage tiebreakers
(G) Guests; (H) Hosts; (W) Withdrew
Notes:
24 November 2019
18:00

| Chile | 1–1 | Ecuador |
|---|---|---|
| Silva 45' | Report | Herrera 24' |

Estadio Arsenio Erico, Asunción
Referee: Kevin Ortega (Peru)
24 November 2019
20:30

| Paraguay | 3–1 | Uruguay |
|---|---|---|
| Enciso 60'; Cardozo 72'; Pereira 81' | Report | Duarte 79' |

Estadio Arsenio Erico, Asunción
Referee: Jhon Ospina (Colombia)

26 November 2019
18:00

| Argentina | 6–0 | Chile |
|---|---|---|
| Barco 8', 28'; Sosa 47'; Romero 55'; Encinas 56'; Castro 57' | Report |

Estadio Luis Alfonso Giagni. Villa Elisa
Referee: Santiago Bismarks (Colombia)
26 November 2019
20:30

| Ecuador | 3–2 | Uruguay |
|---|---|---|
| Gallardo 8'; Medina 47'; Cuero 65' | Report | Jorge 51'; Siri 77' |

Estadio Luis Alfonso Giagni, Villa Elisa
Referee: Orlando Bracamonte (Venezuela)

28 November 2019
18:00

| Argentina | 2–0 | Uruguay |
|---|---|---|
| Romero 38'; Encinas 66' | Report |

Estadio Arsenio Erico, Asunción
Referee: Flavio Rodríguez De Souza (Brazil)
28 November 2019
20:30

| Paraguay | 0–0 | Ecuador |
|---|---|---|
| | Report |

Estadio Arsenio Erico, Asunción
Referee: Jordy Alemán (Bolivia)

30 November 2019
18:00

| Argentina | 1–1 | Ecuador |
|---|---|---|
| Fretes 77' | Report | Cuero 18' |

Estadio Luis Alfonso Giagni, Villa Elisa
Referee: Jhon Ospina (Colombia)
30 November 2019
20:30

| Paraguay | 2–2 | Chile |
|---|---|---|
| Pereira 50'; Vera 83' | Report | Assadi 5'; Palma 22' |

Estadio Luis Alfonso Giagni, Villa Elisa
Referee: Kevin Ortega (Peru)

2 December 2019
18:00

| Uruguay | 3–1 | Chile |
|---|---|---|
| Siri 29' (pen.), 76'; Duarte 74' | Report | Assadi 17' |

Estadio Arsenio Erico, Asunción
Referee: Jordy Alemán (Bolivia)
2 December 2019
20:30

| Paraguay | 0–0 | Argentina |
|---|---|---|
| | Report |

Estadio Arsenio Erico, Asunción
Referee: Flavio Rodríguez De Souza (Brazil)

== Knockout stage ==
The Third place match and the Final were moved from Estadio Arsenio Erico to Estadio Defensores del Chaco.

=== Bracket ===
Semi-finals
5 December – Luque
Argentina | 4
Colombia | 2
5 December – Luque
Brazil | 2
Paraguay | 0

Final
8 December – Asunción
Argentina | 1 (3)
Brazil | 1 (5)
Third place
8 December – Asunción
Colombia | 1
Paraguay | 2

=== Semi-finals ===
5 December 2019
18:00

| Argentina | 4–2 | Colombia |
|---|---|---|
| Álvarez 5'; Jaime 19'; Castro 45'; Barco 51' | Report | Caraballo 44', 56' (pen.) |

Estadio Adrián Jara, Luque
Referee: Franklin Congo (Ecuador)

5 December 2019
20:30

| Brazil | 2–0 | Paraguay |
|---|---|---|
| Arthur 26'; Daniel 71' | Report |

Estadio Adrián Jara, Luque
Referee: Angelo Hermosilla (Chile)

=== Third place match ===
8 December 2019
18:00

| Colombia | 1–2 | Paraguay |
|---|---|---|
| Girado 70' | Report | Benítez 29'; Mercado 45' |

Estadio Defensores del Chaco, Asunción
Referee: Orlando Bracamonte (Venezuela)

=== Final ===
8 December 2019
20:30

| Argentina | 1–1 | Brazil |
|---|---|---|
| Jaime 46' | Report | Vinicius 34' |
Penalties
| Sosa (penalty scored); Romero (penalty missed); Giay (penalty scored); Castro (penalty scored) | 3–5 | (penalty scored) Vinicius; (penalty scored) Daniel; (penalty scored) Kauê; (penalty scored) Andrey; (penalty scored) Kaiky |

Estadio Defensores del Chaco, Asunción
Referee: Kevin Ortega (Peru)

2019 South American Under-15 Football champions

Brazil
Fifth title

== Goalscorers ==
There were 78 goals scored in 29 matches, for an average of 2.69 goals per match.

7 goals

- (Colombia) Ricardo Caraballo

4 goals

- (Brazil) Matheus Nascimento
- (Brazil) Sávio

3 goals

- (Argentina) Valentín Barco
- (Brazil) Robinho
- (Colombia) Sebastián Girado
- (Uruguay) Nicolás Siri

2 goals

- (Argentina) Santiago Castro
- (Argentina) Axel Encinas
- (Argentina) Misael Jaime
- (Argentina) Luka Romero
- (Belgium) Abdul Karim Camara
- (Bolivia) Rhenzo Alcón
- (Brazil) Andrey
- (Chile) Lucas Assadi
- (Ecuador) Justin Cuero
- (Paraguay) Kevin Pereira
- (Uruguay) Anderson Duarte

1 goal

- (Argentina) Fernando Álvarez
- (Argentina) Thomas Fretes
- (Argentina) Federico Sosa
- (Belgium) Bilal El Khannouss
- (Belgium) Léandre Kuavita
- (Brazil) Arthur
- (Brazil) Daniel Silva
- (Brazil) Vinicius
- (Chile) Cristian Palma
- (Chile) Bastián Silva
- (Colombia) Jesús Manuel Díaz
- (Colombia) Breider Villalobos
- (Ecuador) Christian Gallardo
- (Ecuador) Yaimar Medina
- (Ecuador) Orlando Herrera
- (Paraguay) Víctor Benítez
- (Paraguay) Juan Cardozo
- (Paraguay) Julio César Enciso
- (Paraguay) Antonio Mercado
- (Paraguay) Francisco Vera
- (Peru) Jorge del Castillo
- (Peru) Leonardo Díaz
- (Peru) Jorge Tandazo
- (Uruguay) Juan Manuel Jorge
- (Venezuela) Álex Custodio
- (Venezuela) Nicolás Granadino
- (Venezuela) Carlos Rojas
- (Venezuela) Deivid Teguez

1 own goal

- (Venezuela) Nicolás Granadino (playing against Belgium)
