= Guilherme Dalla Déa =

Brazilian footballer

Personal information
- Full name: Carlos Guilherme Dalla Déa
- Date of birth: 28 April 1971 (age 55)
- Place of birth: São Carlos, Brazil

Team information
- Current team: Brazil U15 (head coach)

Managerial career
- Years: Team
- 2008–2011: São Carlos U15
- 2012–2015: São Paulo U15
- 2015–2017: Brazil U15
- 2018–2020: Brazil U17
- 2020–2021: Guangzhou F.C. (youth coordinator)
- 2022–2023: Corinthians U17
- 2024–2025: Atlético Mineiro U20
- 2025–: Brazil U15

Carlos Guilherme Dalla Déa (born 28 April 1971) is a Brazilian football manager. Dalla Déa is the currently Brazil under-15 national team manager.

== Career ==
Originally from São Carlos, Dalla Déa holds a degree in Physical Education from the São Carlos Educational Foundation. He began his managerial career coaching the under-15 team at São Carlos FC and was subsequently hired by São Paulo FC. He won the South American championship with the Brazilian youth national teams, and in 2019 he achieved his greatest title by winning the FIFA U17 World Cup. In 2020, he was hired by Guangzhou F.C. as the main coordinator of the club's youth departments.

After spells at Corinthians and Atlético Mineiro, he returned to the Brazil under-15 national team.

== Honours ==
Brazil U17

- FIFA U-17 World Cup: 2019

Brazil U15

- South American U-15 Championship: 2015
- CONMEBOL Boys' U-15 Evolution League: 2025
- Montaigu Tournament: 2026
