= Marquinhos Santos =

Brazilian football manager (born 1979)

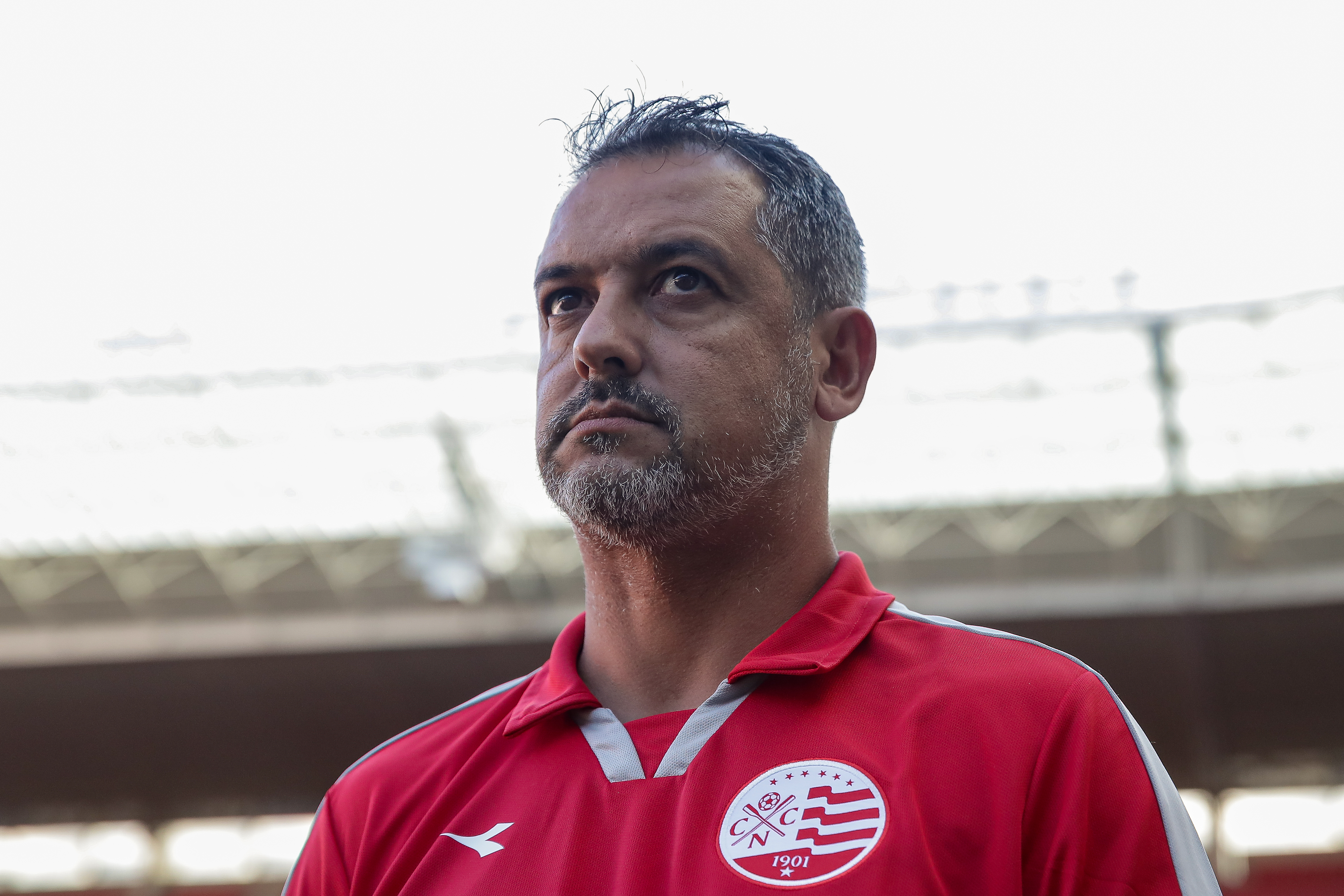
- Marquinhos managing Náutico in 2025

Personal information
- Full name: Marcos Vinícius dos Santos Gonçalves
- Date of birth: 24 May 1979 (age 47)
- Place of birth: Santos, Brazil
- Position: Midfielder

Youth career
- Years: Team
- Santos

Managerial career
- 2011–2012: Brazil U15
- 2012: Brazil U17
- 2012–2013: Coritiba
- 2014: Bahia
- 2014–2015: Coritiba
- 2016: Fortaleza
- 2016–2017: Figueirense
- 2017: Fortaleza
- 2017–2018: Paysandu
- 2018: Londrina
- 2018–2019: São Bento
- 2019: Juventude
- 2019: Chapecoense
- 2020: Juventude
- 2021: Juventude
- 2021–2022: América Mineiro
- 2022: Ceará
- 2023: Paysandu
- 2023: Vila Nova
- 2024: América Natal
- 2025: Náutico
- 2025–2026: Arema

Marcos Vinícius dos Santos Gonçalves (born 24 May 1979), known as Marquinhos Santos, is a Brazilian professional football coach.

== Managerial career ==
Born in Santos, São Paulo, Marquinhos played youth football for Santos FC as a midfielder, but never played professionally. In 1999 he moved to Curitiba, and started working in a small football school in the city called Sociedade Morgenau.

In 2003, Marquinhos joined Atlético Paranaense, being in charge of the youth squads until 2009, when he joined Coritiba's under-20 squad. In 2011 he was appointed manager of the Brazil under-15 national team, and took over the under-17s in the following year, after Emerson Ávila was in charge of the under-20s.

On 6 September 2012, Marquinhos returned to Coritiba, now being appointed first team manager after the dismissal of Marcelo Oliveira. He was dismissed roughly one year later, and was replaced by Péricles Chamusca.

Marquinhos was announced as manager of Bahia on 12 December 2013, but was sacked the following 26 July after nine winless matches. On 24 August, he returned to Coxa, and managed to avoid relegation with the club.

Marquinhos was appointed as manager of Vasco da Gama on 10 December 2014, but decided not to take over to family issues and remained at Coritiba. On 8 June of the following year, he was relieved from his duties at the latter club, after four consecutive defeats.

Marquinhos spent the following three seasons managing clubs in the Série B and in the Série C, such as Fortaleza, Figueirense, Paysandu, Londrina, São Bento and Juventude. On 16 September 2019, he returned to the top tier after being named manager of Chapecoense, seriously threatened with relegation.

Marquinhos returned to Ju for the 2020 season, but was relieved of his duties on 16 March 2020 after a poor start. On 4 February 2021, he returned to Juventude for a third spell.

Marquinhos was dismissed by Juventude on 18 October 2021, after five winless matches, and took over fellow top-tier side América Mineiro just hours later. He left the latter on a mutual agreement on 11 April, with just one league match into the new season.

On 12 June 2022, Marquinhos was announced as manager of Ceará, also in the top tier. He was sacked on 14 August, after 17 matches.

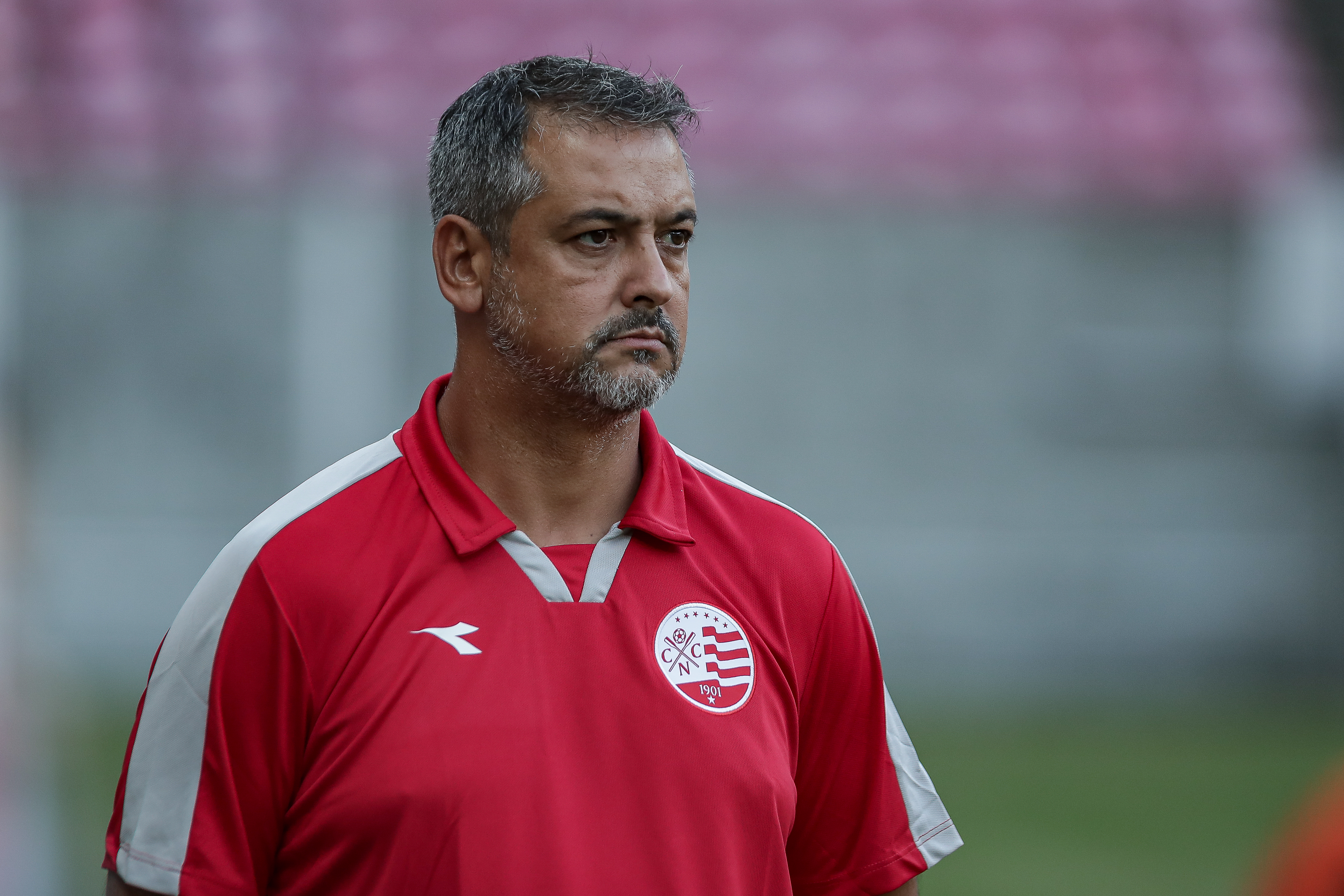
Santos as head coach of Náutico in 2025

On 1 May 2023, after nearly nine months without a club, Marquinhos returned to Paysandu in the third level, but was sacked on 28 June. On 4 August, he replaced Claudinei Oliveira at the helm of Vila Nova in the second division, but was himself dismissed on 20 September.

On 24 October 2023, Marquinhos was announced as head coach of América de Natal. Despite winning the 2024 Campeonato Potiguar, he left by mutual consent the following 9 September

On 28 September 2024, Marquinhos was named head coach of Náutico. He was dismissed the following 14 April, after a 2–1 loss to Itabaiana.

On 26 June 2025, Marquinhos officially become a coach for Indonesian club Arema.

== Managerial statistics ==
As of 23 October 2026

Managerial record by team and tenure
Team	Nat.	From	To	Record								Ref.
Team	Nat.	From	To	G	W	D	L	GF	GA	GD	Win %	Ref.
Coritiba	(Brazil)	6 September 2012	25 September 2013	69	33	19	17	105	72	+33	47.83	
Bahia	(Brazil)	12 December 2013	26 July 2014	35	14	10	11	39	38	+1	40.00	
Coritiba	(Brazil)	24 August 2014	8 June 2015	49	24	7	18	79	66	+13	48.98	
Fortaleza	(Brazil)	5 March 2016	19 September 2016	36	19	9	8	59	38	+21	52.78	
Figueirense	(Brazil)	19 September 2016	16 February 2017	19	4	4	11	15	25	−10	21.05	
Paysandu	(Brazil)	24 June 2017	12 February 2018	35	13	8	14	43	40	+3	37.14	
Londrina	(Brazil)	8 March 2018	28 June 2018	17	7	4	6	17	17	+0	41.18	
São Bento	(Brazil)	28 June 2018	10 February 2019	30	8	9	13	29	38	−9	26.67	
Juventude	(Brazil)	11 March 2019	16 September 2019	30	10	14	6	31	26	+5	33.33	
Chapecoense	(Brazil)	16 September 2019	4 December 2019	19	4	6	9	14	20	−6	21.05	
Juventude	(Brazil)	5 December 2019	16 March 2020	11	1	6	4	6	11	−5	9.09	
Juventude	(Brazil)	4 February 2021	18 October 2021	41	13	12	16	45	51	−6	31.71	
América Mineiro	(Brazil)	18 October 2021	11 April 2022	29	12	8	9	31	24	+7	41.38	
Ceará	(Brazil)	12 June 2022	14 August 2022	17	6	5	6	17	15	+2	35.29	
Paysandu	(Brazil)	1 May 2023	28 June 2023	13	3	4	6	11	21	−10	23.08	
Vila Nova	(Brazil)	4 August 2023	20 September 2023	7	3	1	3	8	6	+2	42.86	
América de Natal	(Brazil)	24 October 2023	9 September 2024	41	19	15	7	60	31	+29	46.34	
Náutico	(Brazil)	28 September 2024	14 April 2025	15	8	2	5	23	14	+9	53.33	
Arema	(Indonesia)	26 June 2025	23 October 2026	40	14	12	14	65	61	+4	35.00	
Career Total				553	215	155	183	697	614	+83	38.88	

== Honours ==
=== Club ===
Coritiba

- Campeonato Paranaense: 2013

Bahia

- Campeonato Baiano: 2014

Fortaleza

- Campeonato Cearense: 2016

América de Natal

- Campeonato Potiguar: 2024

=== International ===
Brazil U15

- South American U-15 Championship: 2011
