= 2015 South American U-15 Championship =

2015 South American Under-15 Football Championship
Campeonato Sudamericano Sub-15 Colombia 2015

Tournament details
- Host country: Colombia
- Dates: 21 November – 6 December
- Teams: 10 (from 1 confederation)
- Venues: 2 (in 2 host cities)

Final positions
- Champions: Brazil (4th title)
- Runners-up: Uruguay
- Third place: Argentina
- Fourth place: Ecuador

Tournament statistics
- Matches played: 24
- Goals scored: 98 (4.08 per match)
- Top scorer: (Brazil) Vitinho (7 goals)
- Fair play award: Brazil

The 2015 South American Under-15 Football Championship was the seventh edition of the South American Under-15 Football Championship, the biennial international youth football championship organised by the CONMEBOL for the men's under-15 national teams of South America. The tournament was held in the cities of Montería and Valledupar, Colombia between 21 November and 6 December 2015.

== Teams ==
All ten CONMEBOL member national teams entered the tournament.

Team	Appearance	Previous best top-4 performance
Argentina	7th	Runners-up (2005)
Bolivia	7th	Fourth place (2005)
Brazil	7th	Champions (2005, 2007, 2011)
Chile	7th	Fourth place (2007, 2013)
Colombia (hosts)	7th	Runners-up (2004, 2011, 2013)
Ecuador	7th	Third place (2009)
Paraguay	7th	Champions (2004, 2009)
Peru (holders)	7th	Champions (2013)
Uruguay	7th	Runners-up (2007)
Venezuela	7th	None

== Venues ==
CONMEBOL appointed Colombia as the host country during its 65th Ordinary Congress on 3 March 2015. The tournament was played in Estadio Municipal de Montería, Montería and Estadio Armando Maestre Pavajeau, Valledupar.

== Squads ==
Each team had to submit a squad of 22 players (three of whom must be goalkeepers) until 30 October 2015. Players born on or after 1 January 2000 are eligible to compete in the tournament.

== First stage ==
The draw of the tournament was held on 16 October 2015 during the CONMEBOL Executive Committee meeting at the Hyatt Hotel in Santiago, Chile. The ten teams were drawn into two groups of five teams. Each group contained one team from each of the five "pairing pots": Colombia–Chile, Argentina–Brazil, Paraguay–Uruguay, Ecuador–Peru, Bolivia–Venezuela. The schedule of the tournament was announced on 28 October 2015.

The top two teams of each group advanced to the final stage.

All times local, COT (UTC−5).

=== Group A ===
Pos	Team	Pld	W	D	L	GF	GA	GD	Pts	Qualification
1	Argentina	4	4	0	0	12	1	+11	12	Final stage
2	Ecuador	4	2	1	1	9	10	−1	7	Final stage
3	Colombia (H)	4	2	0	2	11	12	−1	6	
4	Paraguay	4	1	1	2	9	11	−2	4	
5	Venezuela	4	0	0	4	7	14	−7	0	

Source: CONMEBOL
(H) Hosts
21 November 2015
14:30

Paraguay	2–2	Ecuador
Bóveda 74'; Bergottini 81' (pen.)	Report	Quiñónez 17' (pen.); Parrales 61'

Estadio Armando Maestre Pavajeau, Valledupar
Referee: Eduardo Gamboa (Chile)
21 November 2015
16:45

Colombia	0–3	Argentina
	Report	Garré 32'; Vildoso 82'; Colidio 87'

Estadio Armando Maestre Pavajeau, Valledupar
Referee: Esteban Ostojich (Uruguay)

23 November 2015
14:30

Argentina	3–0	Venezuela
Fernández (?); Colidio (?); Córdoba (?)	Report

Estadio Armando Maestre Pavajeau, Valledupar
Referee: Luis Garay (Peru)
23 November 2015
16:45

Colombia	4–2	Paraguay
Tapia 45+1'; Gutiérrez 66'; Caicedo 70' (pen.), 80'	Report	Bergottini 32', 76'

Estadio Armando Maestre Pavajeau, Valledupar
Referee: Raphael Claus (Brazil)

25 November 2015
14:30

Ecuador	3–2	Venezuela
Parrales 35'; Quiñónez 87' (pen.), 90' (pen.)	Report	Barragán (?)

Estadio Armando Maestre Pavajeau, Valledupar
Referee: Luis Yrusta (Bolivia)
25 November 2015
16:45

Paraguay	1–3	Argentina
Méndez 90'	Report	Colidio 32', 71'; Garré 42'

Estadio Armando Maestre Pavajeau, Valledupar
Referee: Eduardo Gamboa (Chile)

27 November 2015
14:30

Argentina	3–0	Ecuador
Córdoba (?); Obando (?); Almendra (?)	Report

Estadio Armando Maestre Pavajeau, Valledupar
Referee: Raphael Claus (Brazil)
27 November 2015
16:45

Colombia	4–3	Venezuela
Caicedo 30'; López 36'; Tapia 47', 76'	Report	Barragán 60', 71'; Ibarra 73'

Estadio Armando Maestre Pavajeau, Valledupar
Referee: Luis Garay (Peru)

29 November 2015
14:30

Venezuela	2–4	Paraguay
Makoun 36'; Barragán 81'	Report	Rolón 8'; González 25'; Bergottini 37', 68'

Estadio Armando Maestre Pavajeau, Valledupar
Referee: Luis Yrusta (Bolivia)
29 November 2015
16:45

Colombia	3–4	Ecuador
Mejía 44'; Tapia 62'; Hernández 90+4'	Report	Tobar 30', 81'; Espinoza 83'; Piguave 84'

Estadio Armando Maestre Pavajeau, Valledupar
Referee: Esteban Ostojich (Uruguay)

=== Group B ===
Pos	Team	Pld	W	D	L	GF	GA	GD	Pts	Qualification
1	Brazil	4	4	0	0	18	3	+15	12	Final stage
2	Uruguay	4	3	0	1	9	8	+1	9	Final stage
3	Bolivia	4	2	0	2	6	7	−1	6	
4	Peru	4	1	0	3	4	14	−10	3	
5	Chile	4	0	0	4	5	10	−5	0	

Source: CONMEBOL
22 November 2015
14:30

Uruguay	4–0	Peru
Torres (?); Rodríguez (?)	Report

Estadio Municipal de Montería, Montería
Referee: Gustavo Murillo (Colombia)
22 November 2015
16:45

Chile	2–3	Brazil
Romero (?)	Report	Vitinho (?); Paulinho (?)

Estadio Municipal de Montería, Montería
Referee: Dario Herrera (Argentina)

24 November 2015
14:30

Peru	0–3	Bolivia
	Report	Melgar (?); García (?)

Estadio Municipal de Montería, Montería
Referee: José Hoyo (Venezuela)
24 November 2015
16:45

Uruguay	2–1	Chile
Torres 24', 84' (pen.)	Report	Martínez 14'

Estadio Municipal de Montería, Montería
Referee: Eber Aquino (Paraguay)

26 November 2015
14:30

Peru	1–6	Brazil
Valverde (?)	Report	Paulinho 17', 32'; Vinicius 50', 90+2'; Vitinho 55' (pen.); Vinícius Jr. 76'

Estadio Municipal de Montería, Montería
Referee: Gustavo Murillo (Colombia)
26 November 2015
16:45

Uruguay	3–1	Bolivia
Falconis 10'; Mechoso (?); Neris (?)	Report	García (?)

Estadio Municipal de Montería, Montería
Referee: Juan Albarracin (Ecuador)

28 November 2015
14:30

Brazil	3–0	Bolivia
Vinícius Jr. 82', 90+3'; Vitinho 90' (pen.)	Report

Estadio Municipal de Montería, Montería
Referee: Eber Aquino (Paraguay)
28 November 2015
16:45

Chile	1–3	Peru
Vega 53'	Report	Bolívar 6'; Huacho 20'; Gallardo 41'

Estadio Municipal de Montería, Montería
Referee: José Hoyo (Venezuela)

30 November 2015
14:30

Chile	1–2	Bolivia
Vega (?)	Report	García (?); Suárez (?)

Estadio Municipal de Montería, Montería
Referee: Juan Albarracin (Ecuador)
30 November 2015
16:45

Uruguay	0–6	Brazil
	Report	Vitinho 13', 36'; Alan 21', 74'; Vinícius Jr. 35'; Cristian 50'

Estadio Municipal de Montería, Montería
Referee: Dario Herrera (Argentina)

== Final stage ==
=== Bracket ===
Semi-finals
3 December – Valledupar
Argentina	1
Uruguay	2
3 December – Valledupar
Brazil	3
Ecuador	1

Final
6 December – Valledupar
Uruguay	0 (4)
Brazil (p)	0 (5)
Third place
6 December – Valledupar
Argentina	1
Ecuador	0

=== Semi-finals ===
3 December 2015
16:30

Argentina	1–2	Uruguay
Almendra 22'	Report	Napoli 68'; Rodríguez 86'

Estadio Armando Maestre Pavajeau, Valledupar
Referee: Eduardo Gamboa (Chile)

3 December 2015
18:45

Brazil	3–1	Ecuador
Vinícius Jr. 39', 71'; Vitinho 69'	Report	Quiñónez 80'

Estadio Armando Maestre Pavajeau, Valledupar
Referee: Luis Garay (Peru)

=== Third place match ===
6 December 2015
14:30

Argentina	1–0	Ecuador
Obando 85'	Report

Estadio Armando Maestre Pavajeau, Valledupar
Referee: Eber Aquino (Paraguay)

=== Final ===
6 December 2015
16:45

Uruguay	0–0	Brazil
	Report
Penalties
	4–5

Estadio Armando Maestre Pavajeau, Valledupar
Referee: Gustavo Murillo (Colombia)

== Goalscorers ==
7 goals

- (Brazil) Vitinho

6 goals

- (Brazil) Vinícius Jr.

5 goals

- (Paraguay) Carlos Bergottini
- (Uruguay) Facundo Torres
- (Venezuela) José Barragán

4 goals

- (Argentina) Facundo Colidio
- (Bolivia) Jhon García
- (Colombia) Rafael Tapia
- (Ecuador) Josue Quiñónez

3 goals

- (Brazil) Paulinho
- (Colombia) Deiber Caicedo

2 goals

- (Argentina) Agustín Almendra
- (Argentina) Gonzalo Córdoba
- (Argentina) Benjamín Garré
- (Argentina) Agustín Obando
- (Brazil) Alan
- (Brazil) Vinicius
- (Chile) Patricio Romero
- (Chile) Zederiv Vega
- (Ecuador) Andrés Parrales
- (Ecuador) Cristian Tobar
- (Uruguay) Santiago Rodríguez

1 goal

- (Argentina) Facundo Fernández
- (Argentina) Román Vildoso
- (Bolivia) Luis Melgar
- (Bolivia) Nicolás Suárez
- (Brazil) Cristian
- (Chile) Wilson Martínez
- (Colombia) Thomas Gutiérrez
- (Colombia) Maikel Hernández
- (Colombia) Edwin López
- (Colombia) Robert Mejía
- (Ecuador) Joseph Espinoza
- (Ecuador) William Piguave
- (Paraguay) Ángel Bóveda
- (Paraguay) Rodrigo González
- (Paraguay) Yair Méndez
- (Paraguay) Marcelo Rolón
- (Peru) José Bolívar
- (Peru) Frank Gallardo
- (Peru) Renzo Huacho
- (Peru) Luis Valverde
- (Uruguay) Owen Falconis
- (Uruguay) Ezequiel Mechoso
- (Uruguay) Gonzalo Napoli
- (Uruguay) José Neris
- (Venezuela) Rommell Ibarra

Own goals

- (Paraguay) Julio Chamorro (playing against Venezuela)
