= Sávio (footballer, born 2004) =

Brazilian footballer (born 2004)

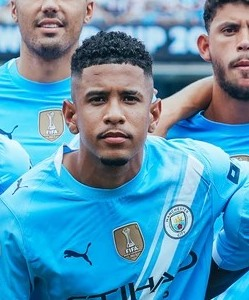
- Sávio in 2025

Personal information
- Full name: Sávio Moreira de Oliveira
- Date of birth: 10 April 2004 (age 22)
- Place of birth: São Mateus, Espírito Santo, Brazil
- Height: 1.76 m (5 ft 9 in)
- Position: Winger

Team information
- Current team: Tottenham Hotspur
- Number: 17

Youth career
- 2015–2020: Atlético Mineiro

Senior career*
Years	Team	Apps	(Gls)
2020–2022	Atlético Mineiro	29	(1)
2022–2024	Troyes	0	(0)
2022–2023	→ Jong PSV (loan)	9	(2)
2022–2023	→ PSV (loan)	6	(0)
2023–2024	→ Girona (loan)	37	(9)
2024–2026	Manchester City	53	(2)
2026–	Tottenham Hotspur	3	(0)

International career^{‡}
2019	Brazil U15	6	(4)
2021	Brazil U17	2	(1)
2021–2023	Brazil U20	6	(1)
2024–	Brazil	13	(1)
Medal record
Men's football
Representing Brazil
South American U-20 Championship
Winner	2023
- * Club domestic league appearances and goals as of 13:39, 19 September 2026 (UTC) ‡ National team caps and goals as of 23:04, 25 March 2025 (UTC)

Sávio Moreira de Oliveira (born 10 April 2004), known as Sávio (Brazilian Portuguese: [ˈsavju]), is a Brazilian professional footballer who plays as a winger for Premier League club Tottenham Hotspur and the Brazil national team.

== Early life ==
Born in São Mateus, Espírito Santo, Sávio was raised on his grandparents' farm.

== Club career ==
=== Atlético Mineiro ===
Sávio joined Atlético Mineiro at the under-14 youth level, quickly drawing attention. Sávio signed his first professional contract on 18 June 2020, securing a three-year deal with a release clause of 60 million euros. With strong performances for Galo, the attacker was called up by the Brazilian U-15 Team to participate in the South American Championship, where he emerged as a champion.

In 2020, Sávio was integrated into the transition team and began training frequently with the professional squad. He made his debut for the first team on 19 August in a 4–3 victory against Atlético Goianiense in Goiânia.

In 2021, he was part of the squad that won the triple crown for Atlético Mineiro that season. In October, he was listed by the English newspaper The Guardian as one of the 60 most promising young players in the world born after 2004.

He scored his first professional goal on 19 May 2022, sealing a 3–1 victory over Independiente del Valle at the Mineirão Stadium in a Copa Libertadores match. On 30 June, Atlético announced an agreement for his transfer to City Football Group for 6.5 million euros, with an additional six million in bonuses. The young attacker was initially allocated to Troyes, a club in France.

=== Troyes and loans to PSV, Girona ===
On 30 June 2022, Atlético Mineiro announced the transfer of Sávio to the City Football Group for a record €6.5 million, with an additional €6 million in performance-related variables. Sávio was initially assigned to Troyes, a Ligue 1 club within the City Group. Before his loan to Girona, another City Group team, he was loaned out to PSV. Sávio never made an appearance for Troyes, while the club nearly suffered consecutive relegations to Ligue 2 and then the Championnat National (the latter was only avoided due to Bordeaux's administrative relegation for financial issues). This led to fan disillusionment and backlash against the City Group ownership.

On 22 July 2022, Sávio joined PSV on loan for the 2022–23 season.

On 13 July 2023, Sávio moved to La Liga side Girona on loan for the 2023–24 season. He finished his loan season at Girona with 9 goals and 10 assists in 37 games. In addition, he made the most successful dribbles in the league with 104.

=== Manchester City ===
On 18 July 2024, Sávio signed for Premier League club Manchester City in a transfer reportedly worth £30.8 million. On 10 August, he made his debut for the club, winning the 2024 Community Shield as City defeated local rivals Manchester United 7–6 on penalties, after a 1–1 draw in regular time. On 18 August, he made his Premier League debut in a 2–0 win away at Chelsea, being replaced by Phil Foden at half-time after suffering a knock. Sávio scored his first City goal on 29 December in a 2–0 league victory over Leicester City, helping the team to their first away win since October. On 4 January 2025, Sávio made two assists and a shot which led to an own goal in a 4–1 home league win over West Ham United. Sávio scored his first UEFA Champions League goal on 29 January as a substitute for İlkay Gündoğan in a 3–1 home league phase victory over Belgian Pro League champions Club Brugge, helping Manchester City secure knockout phase play-offs qualification.

=== Tottenham Hotspur ===
On 25 August 2026, Sávio completed a permanent move to fellow Premier League club Tottenham Hotspur in a deal reportedly worth £75m (£85m with add-ons). He was given the number 17 shirt, and chose to return to his original shirt name of Sávio, rather than Savinho as he had worn at Manchester City. A day later, he scored and assisted on his debut in a 5–1 victory over Charlton Athletic in the EFL Cup.

== International career ==
Sávio was a member of the Brazil U15 team that won the 2019 South American U-15 Championship, during which he scored four goals.

Sávio was also called up to the team which took part in the 2023 FIFA U-20 World Cup. He scored one goal in Brazil's 6–0 group stage victory against the Dominican Republic. Brazil won their group, but was eventually eliminated by Israel in the quarter-finals.

On 1 March 2024, Sávio got his first call-up to the Brazil senior team for the friendlies against England and Spain. He made his debut against England on 23 March 2024, which ended in a 1–0 victory. On 28 June, Sávio scored his first senior goal for Brazil in a 4–1 victory against Paraguay in the 2024 Copa América group stage.

== Personal life ==
Sávio proposed to his childhood sweetheart Anna Carolina Barbosa when he was 18, and the couple got married one year later. She is a physiotherapist. They have a baby daughter together.

== Career statistics ==
=== Club ===
As of match played 19 September 2026

Appearances and goals by club, season and competition
Club	Season	League			State league (Note: Includes Campeonato Mineiro)		National cup (Note: Includes Copa do Brasil, Copa del Rey, FA Cup)		League cup (Note: Includes EFL Cup)		Continental		Other		Total	
Club	Season	Division	Apps	Goals	Apps	Goals	Apps	Goals	Apps	Goals	Apps	Goals	Apps	Goals	Apps	Goals
Atlético Mineiro	2020	Série A	8	0	0	0	0	0	—		0	0	—		8	0
Atlético Mineiro	2021	Série A	4	0	7	0	2	0	—		0	0	—		13	0
Atlético Mineiro	2022	Série A	8	1	2	0	2	0	—		2 (Note: Appearances in Copa Libertadores)	1	—		14	2
Atlético Mineiro	Total		20	1	9	0	4	0	—		2	1	—		35	2
Jong PSV (loan)	2022–23	Eerste Divisie	9	2	—		—		—		—		—		9	2
PSV (loan)	2022–23	Eredivisie	6	0	—		0	0	—		2 (Note: Appearances in UEFA Europa League)	0	0	0	8	0
Girona (loan)	2023–24	La Liga	37	9	—		4	2	—		—		—		41	11
Manchester City	2024–25	Premier League	29	1	—		4	0	2	0	9 (Note: Appearances in UEFA Champions League)	1	4 (Note: One appearance in FA Community Shield, three appearances and one goal in FIFA Club World Cup)	1	48	3
Manchester City	2025–26	Premier League	24	1	—		3	1	2	2	7	0	—		36	4
Manchester City	Total		53	2	—		7	1	4	2	16	1	4	1	84	7
Tottenham Hotspur	2026–27	Premier League	3	0	—		0	0	2	1	—		—		5	1
Career total			128	14	9	0	15	3	6	3	20	2	4	1	182	23

=== International ===
As of match played 25 March 2025

Appearances and goals by national team and year
National team	Year	Apps	Goals
Brazil	2024	11	1
Brazil	2025	2	0
Total		13	1

Scores and results list Brazil's goal tally first, score column indicates score after each Sávio goal

List of international goals scored by Sávio
No.	Date	Venue	Cap	Opponent	Score	Result	Competition
1	28 June 2024	Allegiant Stadium, Las Vegas, United States	5	Paraguay	2–0	4–1	2024 Copa América

== Honours ==
Atlético Mineiro

- Campeonato Brasileiro Série A: 2021
- Copa do Brasil: 2021
- Campeonato Mineiro: 2020, 2021

PSV

- KNVB Cup: 2022–23
- Johan Cruyff Shield: 2022

Manchester City

- FA Cup: 2025–26; runner-up: 2024–25
- EFL Cup: 2025–26
- FA Community Shield: 2024

Brazil U15

- South American U-15 Championship: 2019

Individual

- La Liga U23 Player of the Month: January 2024
- La Liga Team of the Season: 2023–24
