= Ezequiel Mechoso =

Uruguayan football player (born 2000)

Personal information
- Full name: Ezequiel Martín Mechoso Reyes
- Date of birth: 23 March 2000 (age 26)
- Place of birth: Montevideo, Uruguay
- Height: 1.77 m (5 ft 10 in)
- Position: Midfielder

Youth career
- Defensor Sporting
- Peñarol

Senior career*
Years	Team	Apps	(Gls)
2021	Peñarol	1	(0)
2022–2023	Racing Montevideo	11	(0)
2024	Progreso	0	(0)

International career
2014–2015	Uruguay U15	22	(3)
2016–2017	Uruguay U17	11	(0)
- * Club domestic league appearances and goals as of 1 January 2025

Ezequiel Martín Mechoso Reyes (born 23 March 2000) is a Uruguayan professional footballer who plays as a midfielder.

== Club career ==
A former youth academy player of Defensor Sporting, Mechoso joined Peñarol in October 2018 on a three-year deal. He made his professional debut for the club on 25 March 2021 in a 2–0 league win against Progreso.

== International career ==
Mechoso is a former Uruguay youth international. He was part of national youth team squads at 2015 South American U-15 Championship and 2017 South American U-17 Championship.

== Career statistics ==
=== Club ===
As of 7 December 2021

Appearances and goals by club, season and competition
Club	Season	League			Cup		Continental		Other		Total	
Club	Season	Division	Apps	Goals	Apps	Goals	Apps	Goals	Apps	Goals	Apps	Goals
Peñarol	2020	Uruguayan Primera División	1	0	—		0	0	—		1	0
Peñarol	2021	Uruguayan Primera División	0	0	—		0	0	0	0	0	0
Career total			1	0	0	0	0	0	0	0	1	0
