= Estadio Armando Maestre Pavajeau =

Football stadium in Valledupar, Colombia

- El Chemesquemena
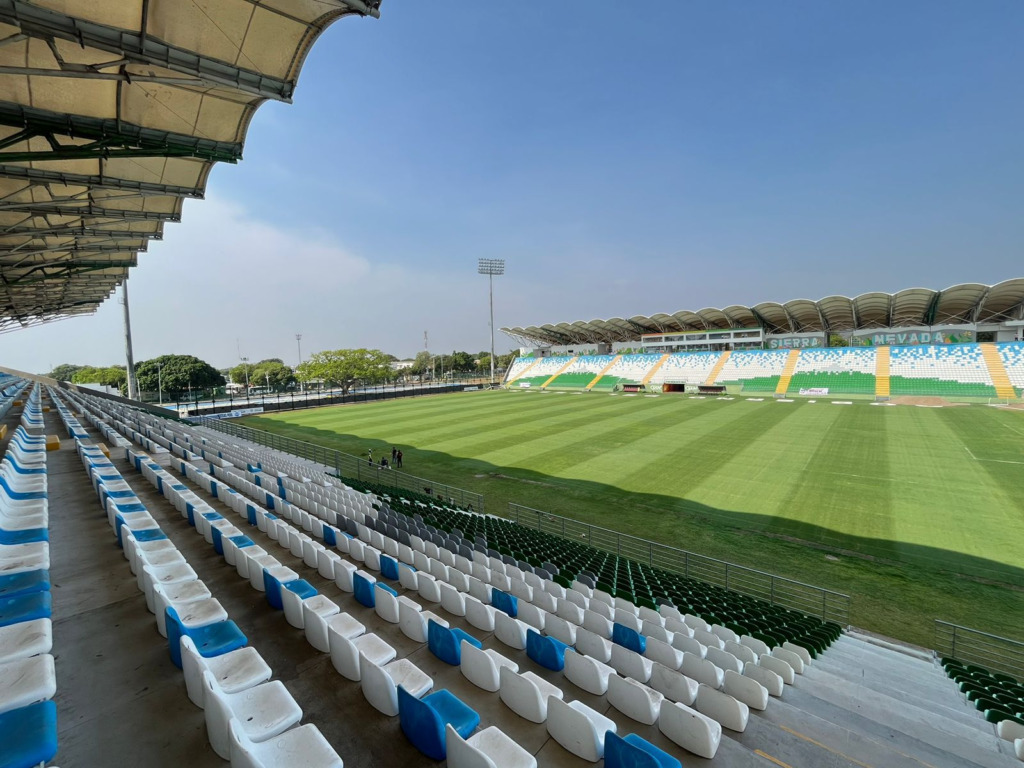
- Panoramic view of Estadio Armando Maestre Pavajeau in March 2024.
- Interactive map of Estadio Armando Maestre Pavajeau
- Location: Valledupar, Cesar, Colombia
- Coordinates: 10°27′56.68″N 73°14′57.61″W
- Capacity: 11,000
- Surface: grass

Construction
- Opened: 1956
- Renovated: 2013–2016

Tenants
- Alianza F.C. Valledupar F.C. (2004–2023)

The Estadio Armando Maestre Pavajeau is a football stadium in Valledupar, Colombia. It has a capacity of 11,000 and is the home stadium of Alianza F.C. It also hosted Valledupar F.C. from 2004 to its folding in 2023.

The stadium was named after Armando Maestre Pavajeau, a former governor of Cesar Department, and was renovated between 2014 and 2016. Besides hosting matches of the domestic football leagues Categoría Primera A and Categoría Primera B, it has also hosted the 2015 South American U-15 Championship and the 2022 Bolivarian Games.
