= Rhenzo Alcón =

Bolivian-Brazilian footballer (born 2004)

Personal information
- Full name: Rhenzo Alcón Andrade
- Date of birth: 21 July 2004 (age 22)
- Place of birth: Rio de Janeiro, Brazil
- Height: 1.80 m (5 ft 11 in)
- Position: Forward

Team information
- Current team: Botafogo

Youth career
- Vasco da Gama
- Fluminense
- 2013: Bradesco
- Vasco da Gama
- Fluminense
- 2018–: Botafogo

International career
Years	Team	Apps	(Gls)
2019	Bolivia U15	4	(2)

Rhenzo Alcón Andrade (born 21 July 2004) is a professional footballer who plays as a forward for Botafogo.

== Club career ==
Born in Rio de Janeiro to a Brazilian father and a Bolivian mother from La Paz, Alcón started his career playing futsal with Vasco da Gama, before a move to Fluminense. Following a short spell with futsal team Bradesco, he returned to Vasco da Gama in August 2014. He returned to Fluminense, where he remained until 2018.

He went on to join Botafogo at the age of thirteen and, following his recovery from knee surgery in February 2021, signed a professional contract with the club in October of the same year. He suffered another knee injury while playing for the youth teams of Botafogo, which kept him out until November 2022.

== International career ==
Alcón is eligible to represent both Bolivia and Brazil at international level, and became a nationalised Bolivian at the age of fifteen. He represented Bolivia at the 2019 South American U-15 Championship, scoring twice in four appearances.
