= Bastián Silva =

Chilean footballer

Personal information
- Full name: Bastián Patricio Alejandro Silva Acevedo
- Date of birth: 5 January 2004 (age 22)
- Place of birth: Santiago, Chile
- Height: 1.65 m (5 ft 5 in)
- Position: Midfielder

Team information
- Current team: Deportes Limache (on loan from Colo-Colo
- Number: 31

Youth career
- 2012–2023: Colo-Colo

Senior career*
Years	Team	Apps	(Gls)
2024–	Colo-Colo	0	(0)
2025–	→ Deportes Limache (loan)	19	(1)

International career
2019	Chile U15	3	(0)
2019	Chile U16	3	(0)
- * Club domestic league appearances and goals as of 10 December 2025

Bastián Patricio Alejandro Silva Acevedo (born 5 January 2004) is a Chilean footballer who plays as a midfielder for Deportes Limache in the Chilean Primera División on loan from Colo-Colo.

== Club career ==
Born in Santiago de Chile, Silva came to the Colo-Colo youth ranks at the age of 8 and signed his first professional contract on 10 January 2024. As the reserve team's captain, he made his debut with the first team under Jorge Almirón in the friendly against Deportes Puerto Montt on 17 July 2024.

The next year, he was loaned out to Deportes Limache in the Chilean Primera División for the 2025 season alongside his fellow Dylan Portilla. He scored his first goal in the 4–3 away loss against Universidad de Chile on 9 November 2025.

== International career ==
Silva represented Chile at under-15 level at the 2019 South American Championship. In the same year, he represented the under-16's in friendlies.
