= Dudu Patetuci =

Brazilian footballer

Personal information
- Full name: Carlos Eduardo Patetuci
- Date of birth: 10 February 1972 (age 54)
- Place of birth: Rio de Janeiro, Brazil
- Height: 1.76 m (5 ft 9 in)
- Position: Midfielder

Team information
- Current team: Brazil U17 (head coach)

Youth career
- Flamengo
- Fluminense

Senior career*
Years	Team	Apps	(Gls)
1991–1994	Fluminense	6	(0)

Managerial career
- 2011–2014: Flamengo U15 (assistant)
- 2014–2017: Flamengo U15
- 2017–2019: Vasco da Gama U15
- 2019: Brazil U16
- 2020–2024: Brazil U15
- 2024–: Brazil U17
- * Club domestic league appearances and goals

Carlos Eduardo Patetuci (born 10 February 1972), known as Dudu Patetuci, is a Brazilian football coach and former player who played as a midfielder. He is the current head coach of the Brazil under-17 national team.

== Playing career ==
Known simply as Dudu as a player, he played for the youth teams of Flamengo and Fluminense. Promoted to the latter's first team in 1991, he only made his senior debut on 8 March 1993, in a 1–0 Campeonato Carioca win over São Cristóvão. He featured in 24 matches for Flu until 1994.

== Coaching career ==
After retiring, Patetuci graduated in physical education from the Federal University of Rio de Janeiro. In 2014 he began his coaching career with Flamengo's under-15 team, achieving rapid success, and later coached Vasco da Gama.

In October 2019, Patetuci was hired by the Brazilian Football Confederation to coach Brazil's under-18 and under-16 teams.

== Honours ==
Flamengo U15

- Copa Votorantim Sub-15: 2015, 2017

Vasco da Gama U15

- Campeonato Carioca Sub-15: 2019

Brazil U17

- South American U-17 Championship: 2025
