= Thomas Gutiérrez =

Venezuelan footballer (born 2000)

Thomás Gutiérrez
Personal information
- Full name: Thomas Gutiérrez Serna
- Date of birth: 1 March 2000 (age 26)
- Place of birth: Mérida, Venezuela
- Height: 1.86 m (6 ft 1 in)
- Position: Centre-back

Team information
- Current team: Nacional
- Number: 4

Youth career
- Independiente Medellín
- 2018–2019: C. D. Estudiantil
- 2020–2021: River Plate
- 2021–2022: Barracas Central II

Senior career*
Years	Team	Apps	(Gls)
2022–2023	Barracas Central	1	(0)
2023	Deportivo Pereira	1	(0)
2022–2024	Sportivo Ameliano	55	(0)
2024–	Libertad	10	(0)
2025–	→ Nacional (loan)	3	(0)

International career^{‡}
2017	Colombia U17	12	(0)
2025–	Venezuela	1	(0)
- * Club domestic league appearances and goals as of 2 August 2025 ‡ National team caps and goals as of 13:05, 11 January 2025 (UTC)

Thomas Gutiérrez Serna (born 1 March 2000) is a Venezuelan professional footballer who plays as a centre-back for Nacional, on loan from Libertad and the Venezuela national team.

== Club career ==
=== Early years ===
Born in Venezuela, he has lived in Medellín since he was two months old and his parents are Colombian.

Thomas Gutiérrez's sporting career began at Club Deportivo Estudiantil, a training team in Medellín, where he was called up to the Colombia U15 and U17 national teams. In 2018 he was loaned to Deportivo Independiente Medellín youth divisions, and from there he returned to Estudiantil.

=== River Plate ===
His arrival in the youth divisions of River Plate of Argentina occurred in 2020 on loan with an option to buy and he had outstanding performances, including in the 2020 U-20 Copa Libertadores where he was runner-up. His performance led to him signing his first contract with River Plate's first team in August 2021, which runs until 2024.

=== Barracas Central ===
In January 2022, in order to get more playing time, he was loaned to Barracas Central.

=== Deportivo Pereira ===
On 26 December 2022 he will join Deportivo Pereira in Colombia on a free contract.

=== Sportivo Ameliano ===
On 1 July 2023, it was announced that Gutierrez had been transferred to Paraguayan Primera Division side Sportivo Ameliano for an undisclosed fee.

=== Libertad ===
On 7 February 2025, it was announced that Gutiérrez would leave Sportivo Ameliano to join Libertad of the Paraguayan Primera División.

==== Loan to Nacional ====
On 18 July 2025, it was announced that Gutierrez had signed for Paraguayan Primera Division side Nacional on a season-long loan.

== International career ==
Born in Venezuela, he played with the Colombian youth national teams, because Gutiérrez has Colombian ancestry, participating in two international tournaments.

In 2025, he decided to become a citizen of the Venezuelan national football team, making his debut in a friendly match against the United States national team.
