= Axel Encinas =

Argentine footballer

Personal information
- Full name: Axel Alejandro Encinas
- Date of birth: 24 May 2004 (age 22)
- Place of birth: Don Torcuato, Argentina
- Height: 1.65 m (5 ft 5 in)
- Position: Attacking midfielder

Team information
- Current team: Unión La Calera
- Number: 27

Youth career
- San Calal
- 2015–2023: River Plate

Senior career*
Years	Team	Apps	(Gls)
2024–	Unión La Calera	33	(0)

International career
2019	Argentina U16	1	(0)
2023	Argentina U20	3	(0)
- * Club domestic league appearances and goals as of 27 May 2026

Axel Alejandro Encinas (born 24 May 2004) is an Argentine footballer who plays as an attacking midfielder for Chilean club Unión La Calera.

== Early life ==
From the San Jorge neighborhood, in Don Torcuato, the same area as Argentine professional footballer Juan Román Riquelme heralded from. He played at the San Calal club, in Sordeaux, near Don Torcuato before joining the youth system at River Plate, aged 11, for whom he played as a winger and a striker before settling into a number 10 role. He impressed enough to begin training with the first team occasionally from his mid-teens where he received advice and coaching from Marcelo Gallardo. He has a reputation for possessing good ball control.

== Club career ==
In June 2020 he agreed his first professional contract with River Plate, signing a three-year contract. Encinas signed a new contract with River Plate in January 2023 keeping him at the club until 2025.

In January 2024, he ended his contract with River Plate after making seventy three appearances for the reserve team with three goals and five assists and then moved to Chile joining Unión La Calera.

== International career ==
In 2019, Encinas represented Argentina at under-16 level in a friendly against Brazil.

He was named in the Argentina under-20 squad by Javier Mascherano for the 2023 South American U-20 Championship held in Colombia in January and February 2023.

== Personal life ==
Nicknamed ‘El Gordo’, the same as Argentine World Cup winner Enzo Fernández.
