= Luis Valverde =

Peruvian footballer (born 2000)

Personal information
- Full name: Luis Leonardo Valverde Ledesma
- Date of birth: 7 April 2000 (age 26)
- Place of birth: Ascope, Peru
- Height: 1.81 m (5 ft 11 1/2 in)
- Position: Defender

Team information
- Current team: Deportivo Binacional
- Number: 3

Youth career
- –2020: Universitario

Senior career*
Years	Team	Apps	(Gls)
2020–2021	Universitario	18	(0)
2021–2022	FC Carlos Stein	14	(0)
2022	Deportivo Coopsol	7	(0)
2023–2024	Comerciantes Unidos	19	(0)
2024–	Deportivo Binacional	15	(2)
- * Club domestic league appearances and goals as of 7 September 2024

Luis Leonardo Valverde Ledesma (born 7 April 2000) is a Peruvian professional footballer who plays as a defender for Liga 1 club Deportivo Binacional.

== Career ==
Born in Ascope, Valverde signed his first professional contract with Club Universitario de Deportes in February 2018 at the age of 17. His contract with the club was ended in August 2021.
