= 2009 South American U-15 Championship =

2009 South American Under-15 Football Championship
Sudamericano Sub-15 Campeonato de Fútbolt Bolivia 2009

Tournament details
- Host country: Bolivia
- Dates: 6–22 November
- Teams: 10
- Venue: 4 (in 4 host cities)

Final positions
- Champions: Paraguay (2nd title)
- Runners-up: Brazil
- Third place: Ecuador
- Fourth place: Uruguay

Tournament statistics
- Matches played: 26
- Goals scored: 83 (3.19 per match)
- Top scorer(s): (Brazil) Lucas Piazón (10 goals)

The 2009 South American Under-15 Football Championship was the fourth South American Under-15 Football Championship, the championship for men's under-15 national association football teams in CONMEBOL. It took place in Bolivia for the second time from 6 November to 22 November 2011.

== Teams ==
- Argentina
- Bolivia (hosts)
- Brazil (holders)
- Chile
- Colombia
- Ecuador
- Paraguay
- Peru
- Uruguay
- Venezuela

== Venues ==
Four stadiums in four host cities were chosen for the tournament:

| City | Stadium | Capacity |
|---|---|---|
| Cochabamba | Estadio Félix Capriles | 32.000 |
| Santa Cruz de la Sierra | Estadio Ramón Tahuichi Aguilera | 40.000 |
| Montero | Estadio Gilberto Parada | 12.000 |
| Sucre | Estadio Olímpico Patria | 32.000 |

== Officials ==
On 7 October 2009, CONMEBOL's Commission on Referees announced the list of 10 referees and assistant to be used for the tournament.

Officials

- (Argentina) Federico Beligoy
- (Bolivia) Raúl Orosco
- (Brazil) Ricardo Márquez
- (Chile) Claudio Puga
- (Colombia) Imer Machado
- (Ecuador) Omar Ponce
- (Paraguay) Julio Quintana
- (Peru) Héctor Pacheco
- (Uruguay) Darío Ubríaco
- (Venezuela) Marlon Escalante

Assistants

- (Argentina) Ariel Bustos
- (Bolivia) Efraín Castro
- (Brazil) Marcelo Van Gasse
- (Chile) Julio Díaz Pardo
- (Colombia) Wilmar Navarro
- (Ecuador) Christian Lescano
- (Paraguay) Melciades Saldivar
- (Peru) Jonny Bossio
- (Uruguay) William Casavieja
- (Venezuela) Jorge Urrego

== First round ==
The 10 national teams were divided in 2 groups of 5 teams each. The top 2 teams in each group qualified for the final round.

=== Group A ===
| Team | Pts | Pld | W | D | L | GF | GA |
|---|---|---|---|---|---|---|---|
| Brazil | 10 | 4 | 3 | 1 | 0 | 18 | 3 |
| Paraguay | 7 | 4 | 2 | 1 | 1 | 8 | 8 |
| Chile | 6 | 4 | 2 | 0 | 2 | 6 | 8 |
| Bolivia | 4 | 4 | 1 | 1 | 2 | 4 | 7 |
| Venezuela | 1 | 4 | 0 | 1 | 3 | 3 | 13 |

6 November 2009
| Paraguay | 2 : 2 | Brazil | Estadio Félix Capriles, Cochabamba |
| Bolivia | 1 : 1 | Venezuela | Estadio Félix Capriles, Cochabamba |
8 November 2009
| Venezuela | 1 : 3 | Paraguay | Estadio Félix Capriles, Cochabamba |
| Bolivia | 1 : 0 | Chile | Estadio Félix Capriles, Cochabamba |
10 November 2009
| Brazil | 5 : 0 | Chile | Estadio Félix Capriles, Cochabamba |
| Bolivia | 1 : 2 | Paraguay | Estadio Félix Capriles, Cochabamba |
12 November 2009
| Chile | 4 : 1 | Paraguay | Estadio Félix Capriles, Cochabamba |
| Brazil | 7 : 0 | Venezuela | Estadio Félix Capriles, Cochabamba |
14 November 2009
| Chile | 2 : 1 | Venezuela | Estadio Félix Capriles, Cochabamba |
| Bolivia | 1 : 4 | Brazil | Estadio Olímpico Patria, Sucre |

=== Group B ===
| Team | Pts | Pld | W | D | L | GF | GA |
|---|---|---|---|---|---|---|---|
| Uruguay | 10 | 4 | 3 | 1 | 0 | 7 | 3 |
| Ecuador | 7 | 4 | 2 | 1 | 1 | 6 | 3 |
| Colombia | 5 | 4 | 1 | 2 | 1 | 6 | 5 |
| Argentina | 4 | 4 | 1 | 1 | 2 | 5 | 7 |
| Peru | 1 | 4 | 0 | 1 | 3 | 3 | 9 |

7 November 2009
| Peru | 1 : 3 | Colombia | Estadio Ramón Tahuichi Aguilera, Santa Cruz de la Sierra |
| Argentina | 0 : 1 | Ecuador | Estadio Ramón Tahuichi Aguilera, Santa Cruz de la Sierra |
9 November 2009
| Ecuador | 1 : 1 | Colombia | Estadio Gilberto Parada, Montero |
| Uruguay | 1 : 1 | Peru | Estadio Gilberto Parada, Montero |
11 November 2009
| Uruguay | 2 : 1 | Ecuador | Estadio Gilberto Parada, Montero |
| Colombia | 2 : 2 | Argentina | Estadio Gilberto Parada, Montero |
13 November 2009
| Argentina | 1 : 3 | Uruguay | Estadio Ramón Tahuichi Aguilera, Santa Cruz de la Sierra |
| Ecuador | 3 : 0 | Peru | Estadio Ramón Tahuichi Aguilera, Santa Cruz de la Sierra |
15 November 2009
| Uruguay | 1 : 0 | Colombia | Estadio Ramón Tahuichi Aguilera, Santa Cruz de la Sierra |
| Argentina | 2 : 1 | Peru | Estadio Ramón Tahuichi Aguilera, Santa Cruz de la Sierra |

== Final round ==
The final round was played in a round robin system between the four best teams.

| Team | Pts | Pld | W | D | L | GF | GA |
|---|---|---|---|---|---|---|---|
| Paraguay | 7 | 3 | 2 | 1 | 0 | 6 | 3 |
| Brazil | 5 | 3 | 1 | 2 | 0 | 5 | 4 |
| Ecuador | 4 | 3 | 1 | 1 | 1 | 3 | 3 |
| Uruguay | 0 | 3 | 0 | 0 | 3 | 3 | 7 |

18 November 2009
| Brazil | 1 : 1 | Ecuador | Estadio Ramón Tahuichi Aguilera, Santa Cruz de la Sierra |
| Uruguay | 1 : 3 | Paraguay | Estadio Ramón Tahuichi Aguilera, Santa Cruz de la Sierra |
20 November 2009
| Brazil | 2 : 2 | Paraguay | Estadio Ramón Tahuichi Aguilera, Santa Cruz de la Sierra |
| Uruguay | 1 : 2 | Ecuador | Estadio Ramón Tahuichi Aguilera, Santa Cruz de la Sierra |
22 November 2009
| Ecuador | 0 : 1 | Paraguay | Estadio Ramón Tahuichi Aguilera, Santa Cruz de la Sierra |
| Brazil | 2 : 1 | Uruguay | Estadio Ramón Tahuichi Aguilera, Santa Cruz de la Sierra |

2009 South American Under-15 Football champions

Paraguay
Second title
