= South American U-15 Championship =

CONMEBOL Sub 15
- Organizer(s): CONMEBOL
- Founded: 2004; 22 years ago
- Region: South America
- Teams: 10
- Related competitions: South American U-20 Championship; South American U-17 Championship
- Current champion: Paraguay (3rd title)
- Most championships: Brazil (5 titles)
- Website: Official website
- 2023 CONMEBOL Sub 15

The South American U-15 Championship (Spanish: Campeonato Sudamericano Sub-15; Portuguese: Campeonato Sul-Americano Sub-15), branded as CONMEBOL Sub 15, is a South American association football competition held every two years contested by male players under the age of 15 and is organized by CONMEBOL, the governing body for football in South America. The first edition was for under-16 age players.

Brazil is the most successful team with five titles.

== Results ==
Edition	Year	Host	Final			Third Place Match		
Edition	Year	Host	Winner	Score	Runner-up	Third Place	Score	Fourth Place
1	2004; Details	Paraguay	Paraguay	0–0 (5–3 pen.)	Colombia	Argentina	No third place match	Uruguay
2	2005; Details	Bolivia	Brazil	6–2	Argentina	Paraguay	1–0	Bolivia
3	2007; Details	Brazil	Brazil		Uruguay	Argentina		Chile
4	2009; Details	Bolivia	Paraguay		Brazil	Ecuador		Uruguay
5	2011; Details	Uruguay	Brazil		Colombia	Argentina		Uruguay
6	2013; Details	Bolivia	Peru	1–0	Colombia	Argentina	2–1	Chile
7	2015; Details	Colombia	Brazil	0–0 (5–4 pen.)	Uruguay	Argentina	1–0	Ecuador
8	2017; Details	Argentina	Argentina	3–2	Brazil	Paraguay	No third place match	Peru
9	2019; Details	Paraguay	Brazil	1–1 (5–3 pen.)	Argentina	Paraguay	2–1	Colombia
10	2023; Details	Bolivia	Paraguay	0–0 (4–3 pen.)	Ecuador	Argentina	2–1	Chile
CONMEBOL U-15 Evolution League
11	2025	Paraguay	Brazil	2–2 (5–3 pen.)	Argentina	Venezuela	0–0 (6–5 pen.)	Uruguay

== Performances by countries ==
Team	Titles	Runners-up	Third-place	Fourth-place
Brazil	6 (2005, 2007, 2011, 2015, 2019, 2025)	2 (2009, 2017)		
Paraguay	3 (2004, 2009, 2023)		3 (2005, 2017, 2019)	
Argentina	1 (2017)	3 (2005, 2019, 2025)	6 (2004, 2007, 2011, 2013, 2015, 2023)	
Peru	1 (2013)			1 (2017)
Colombia		3 (2004, 2011, 2013)		1 (2019)
Uruguay		2 (2007, 2015)		4 (2004, 2009, 2011, 2025)
Ecuador		1 (2023)	1 (2009)	1 (2015)
Venezuela			1 (2025)	
Chile				3 (2007, 2013, 2023)
Bolivia				1 (2005)

== Awards ==
=== Topscorers ===
Edition	Player	Goals
2004	(Brazil) Kerlon (Paraguay) Carlos Javier Acuña (Paraguay) Germán Angel Segovia	4
2005	(Argentina) Federico Laurito	7
2007	(Uruguay) Nicolás Mezquida	5
2009	(Brazil) Lucas Piazón	10
2011	(Brazil) Joao Arthur	11
2013	(Peru) Luis Iberico	7
2015	(Brazil) Vitinho	7
2017	(Colombia) Juan Alegría	10
2019	(Colombia) Ricardo Caraballo	10
2023	(Chile) Zidane Yáñez	5
2025	(Argentina) Bruno Cabral	10

== See also ==
- South American Under-17 Football Championship
- South American Youth Football Championship
