= Argentina national under-15 football team =

National association football team

Argentina U-15
- Nickname(s): Albiceleste (The White and Sky Blue); Los Cebollitas (Little Onions); Los Pibes (The Kids)
- Association: Asociación del Fútbol Argentino (Argentine Football Association)
- Confederation: CONMEBOL (South American Football Confederation)
- Head coach: Diego Placente
- FIFA code: ARG
First colours	Second colours

First international
- Argentina 2–1 United States (San Juan, Argentina; November 12, 2004)

Biggest win
- Argentina 8–2 Czech Republic (San Juan, Argentina; November 9, 2017)

Biggest defeat
- Brazil 6–2 Argentina (Santa Cruz de la Sierra, Bolivia; November 4, 2005) Records for competitive matches only.

South American U-15 Championship
- Appearances: 9 (first in 2004)
- Best result: Winners: 2017
Medal record
South American Championship
Gold medal – first place	2017 Argentina
Silver medal – second place	2005 Bolivia
Silver medal – second place	2019 Paraguay
Bronze medal – third place	2004 Paraguay
Bronze medal – third place	2007 Brazil
Bronze medal – third place	2011 Uruguay
Bronze medal – third place	2013 Bolivia
Bronze medal – third place	2015 Colombia

The Argentina national under-15 football team (Selección de fútbol sub-15 de Argentina), also known as Argentina Under-15 or Argentina U15, represents Argentina in association football, at an under-15 age level and is controlled by the Argentine Football Confederation, the governing body for football in Argentina.

In 2017, the team won the South American U-15 Championship for the first time in its history, which was also held in Argentina for the first time.

== Competitive record ==
=== South American U-15 Championship ===
Champions Runners up Third place Fourth place

South American U-15 Championship record
Year	Round	Position	Pld	W	D	L	GF	GA
(Paraguay) 2004	Semifinals	Third place	5	4	0	1	8	3
(Bolivia) 2005	Final	Runners-Up	6	5	0	1	15	9
(Brazil) 2007	Final Round	Third place	7	2	3	2	10	12
(Bolivia) 2009	First Stage	-	4	1	1	2	5	7
(Uruguay) 2011	Final Round	Third place	7	3	1	3	10	13
(Bolivia) 2013	Semifinals	Third place	6	4	1	1	13	10
(Colombia) 2015	Semifinals	Third place	6	5	0	1	14	3
(Argentina) 2017	Final	Champions	7	5	2	0	25	11
(Paraguay) 2019	Final	Runners-Up	6	3	3	0	14	4
(Bolivia) 2023	Semifinais	Third place	6	3	3	0	10	7
Total	9/9	1 Title	60	35	14	11	124	79

=== Summer Youth Olympic Football Tournament ===
Summer Youth Olympics record
Year	Round	Position	Pld	W	D	L	GF	GA
(Singapore) 2010	Did not participate							
(China) 2014	Did not qualify							
Total	0/2	-	-	-	-	-	-	-

== Honours ==
- CONMEBOL Sub 15
  - (gold) Champions (1): 2017
  - (silver) Runners-up (2): 2005, 2019
  - (bronze) Third Place (6): 2004, 2007, 2011, 2013, 2015, 2023
- Copa de México de Naciones
  - (gold) Champions (1): 2013
- Vlatko Marković International Tournament
  - (gold) Champions (1): 2019

== See also ==
- Argentina national under-20 football team
- Argentina national under-17 football team
- Argentina Olympic football team
- Argentina national football team
- Argentina national futsal team
