= Vitinho (footballer, born January 2000) =

Brazilian footballer

Personal information
- Full name: Victor Gabriel Moura de Oliveira
- Date of birth: 4 January 2000 (age 26)
- Place of birth: Guarulhos, Brazil
- Height: 1.75 m (5 ft 9 in)
- Position: Attacking midfielder

Team information
- Current team: Pouso Alegre

Youth career
- 2005–2021: Corinthians

Senior career*
Years	Team	Apps	(Gls)
2021–2022	Corinthians	29	(1)
2022	→ Vasco da Gama	4	(1)
2022–2025	Arouca	16	(0)
2025–	Pouso Alegre	0	(0)

International career^{‡}
2017	Brazil U17	11	(0)
- * Club domestic league appearances and goals as of 27 December 2024 ‡ National team caps and goals as of 14:27, 3 June 2021 (UTC)

Victor Gabriel Moura de Oliveira (born 4 January 2000), commonly known as Vitinho, is a Brazilian footballer who plays as an attacking midfielder for Pouso Alegre.

== Career statistics ==
=== Club ===
As of 27 October 2021.

Club	Season	League			State League		Cup		Continental		Other		Total	
Club	Season	Division	Apps	Goals	Apps	Goals	Apps	Goals	Apps	Goals	Apps	Goals	Apps	Goals
Corinthians	2021	Série A	16	1	4 (Note: Appearances in the Campeonato Paulista)	0	0	0	3 (Note: Appearances in the Copa Sudamericana)	0	—		23	1
Career total			16	1	4	0	0	0	3	0	0	0	23	1
