= Colombia national under-15 football team =

National association football team

Colombia
- Nickname: Los Cafeteros (The Coffee growers)
- Association: Federación Colombiana de Fútbol (FCF)
- Confederation: CONMEBOL (South America)
- Head coach: Jorge Eduardo Serna
- FIFA code: COL
First colours	Second colours

First international
- Colombia 1–0 Mexico (Pedro Juan Caballero, Paraguay; 13 September 2004)

Biggest win
- Colombia 12–0 Czech Republic (San Juan, Argentina; 11 November 2017)

Biggest defeat
- Colombia 0–3 Argentina (Valledupar, Colombia; 21 November 2015)

Youth Olympic Games
- Appearances: 0

South American U-15 Championship
- Appearances: 8 (first in 2004)
- Best result: Runners-up 2004, 2011, 2013

The Colombia national under-15 football team represents Colombia in international under-15 football competitions and is overseen by the Colombian Football Federation.

== Competitive record ==
*Draws include knockout matches decided on penalty kicks.
**Gold background colour indicates that the tournament was won.
***Red border colour indicates tournament was held on home soil.

Champions Runners-up Third Place Fourth place

=== Youth Olympic Games ===
Year	Round	Position	Pld	W	D*	L	GF	GA
(Singapore) 2010	Did not Enter							
(China) 2014	Did not Qualify							
Total		0/2	0	0	0	0	0	0

=== South American U-15 Championship ===
From 2013, the champion qualifies for the Youth Olympic Games.

Year	Round	Position	Pld	W	D*	L	GF	GA
(Paraguay) 2004	Runners-up	2nd	6	4	1	1	7	1
(Bolivia) 2005	First stage	5th	4	1	1	2	8	7
(Brazil) 2007	First stage	8th	4	0	3	1	5	6
(Bolivia) 2009	First stage	6th	4	1	2	1	6	5
(Uruguay) 2011	Runners-up	2nd	7	4	2	1	10	6
(Bolivia) 2013	Runners-up	2nd	6	4	1	1	11	4
(Colombia) 2015	First stage	5th	4	2	0	2	11	12
(Argentina) 2017	First stage	7th	5	2	1	2	19	8
(Paraguay) 2019	Fourth place	4th	6	3	1	2	11	7
(Bolivia) 2023	First stage	7th	4	1	0	3	4	4
Total	Runners-up	10/10	50	22	12	16	92	60

== Schedule and results ==
Win Draw Loss

== Current squad ==
The following players were named for the 2023 South American U-15 Championship.

No.	Pos.	Player	Date of birth (age)	Club
1	GK	Santiago Mondragón	3 April 2008 (aged 16)	(Colombian Football Federation) Deportivo Cali
2	DF	Brait García	7 March 2008 (aged 16)	(Colombian Football Federation) Deportivo Cali
3	DF	Edmilson Herazo (captain)	19 September 2008 (aged 16)	(Colombian Football Federation) Barranquilla
4	DF	Nicolás Caro	11 January 2008 (aged 16)	(Colombian Football Federation) Envigado
5	DF	Óscar Gómez	7 February 2008 (aged 16)	(Colombian Football Federation) Atlético Huila
6	MF	Cristian Orozco	13 July 2008 (aged 16)	(Colombian Football Federation) Rojo
7	MF	Feder Rivas	9 January 2008 (aged 16)	(Colombian Football Federation) Atlético Nacional
8	MF	Juan Cataño	21 May 2008 (aged 16)	(Colombian Football Federation) Envigado
9	FW	Santiago Londoño	29 February 2008 (aged 16)	(Colombian Football Federation) Envigado
10	MF	Romario Espín	27 January 2008 (aged 16)	(Colombian Football Federation) Millonarios
11	FW	Jhon Sevillano	12 October 2008 (aged 15)	(Colombian Football Federation) Atlético Nacional
12	GK	Jorman Mendoza	14 January 2008 (aged 16)	(Colombian Football Federation) Envigado
13	DF	Criss Macías	2 August 2008 (aged 16)	(Colombian Football Federation) Millonarios
14	DF	Juan David Aponzá	24 May 2008 (aged 16)	(Colombian Football Federation) América de Cali
15	MF	Miguel Agámez	15 May 2009 (aged 15)	(Colombian Football Federation) Barranquilla
16	FW	Juan Pablo Mosquera	21 September 2008 (aged 16)	(Colombian Football Federation) Estudiantil
17	FW	Darwin Torres	15 June 2008 (aged 16)	(Colombian Football Federation) Barranquilla
18	FW	Juan Córdoba	17 March 2009 (aged 15)	(Colombian Football Federation) Orsomarso
19	MF	Ángel Mora	11 March 2008 (aged 16)	(Colombian Football Federation) Santa Fe
20	DF	Yeminson Urrutia	9 January 2008 (aged 16)	(Colombian Football Federation) Sócrates Valencia
21	FW	Kevin Angulo	4 July 2008 (aged 16)	(Colombian Football Federation) Cyclones Cali
22	GK	Jhusstyn Rentería	7 June 2008 (aged 16)	(Colombian Football Federation) Atlético Nacional

== Honours ==
- South American U-15 Championship:
  - Runners-up (3): 2004, 2011, 2013

== See also ==
- Colombia national football team
- Colombia national futsal team
- Colombia Olympic football team
- Colombia national under-20 football team
- Colombia national under-17 football team
