= Brazil national under-15 football team =

National association football team

Brazil U-15
- Nickname(s): Seleção Sub-15 (The Selection U-15); Canarinho (Little Canary); Amarelinha (Little Yellow); Verde-Amarela (Green-Yellow)
- Association: Confederação Brasileira de Futebol (CBF)
- Confederation: CONMEBOL (South America)
- Head coach: Guilherme Dalla Déa
- FIFA code: BRA
First colours	Second colours

First international
- Brazil 6–0 Ecuador (Montero, Bolivia; October 23, 2005)

Biggest win
- Venezuela 0–7 Brazil (Cochabamba, Bolivia; November 12, 2009)

Biggest defeat
- Peru 3–0 Brazil (Passo D'Areia, Brazil; October 27, 2007); Brazil 0–3 Colombia (Luque, Paraguay; December 1, 2019) Records for competitive matches only.

South American U-15 Championship
- Appearances: 7 (first in 2005)
- Best result: Winners: 2005, 2007, 2011, 2015, 2019

Brazil national under-15 football team (Seleção Brasileira de Futebol Sub-15), also known as Brazil Under-15 or Seleção Sub-15, represents Brazil in association football, at an under-15 age level and is controlled by the Brazilian Football Confederation, the governing body for football in Brazil.

== Titles ==
- South American Under-15 Football Championship
  - Winners (5): 2005, 2007, 2011, 2015, 2019
  - Runners-up (2): 2009, 2017
- Tampa International Tournament
  - Winners: 2005
- Torneo Internacional Simón Bolívar
  - Winners: 2015
- CONMEBOL Boys' U-15 Evolution League
  - Winners: 2025, 2026

== Managers ==
- Lucho Nizzo (2004)
- Edgar Pereira (2005)
- Jorge da Silveira (2007)
- Leandro Louredo (2009)
- Marquinhos Santos (2011)
- Caio Zanardi (2013)
- Guilherme Dalla Déa (2015)
- Paulo Victor Gomes (2017–2019)
- Dudu Patetuci (2021–2024)
- Guilherme Dalla Déa (2025–)
