= 2011 South American U-15 Championship =

Campeonato Sudamericano Sub-15 Uruguay 2011

Tournament details
- Host country: Uruguay
- Dates: 17 November – 4 December
- Teams: 10 (from 1 confederation)
- Venue: 3 (in 3 host cities)

Final positions
- Champions: Brazil (3rd title)
- Runners-up: Colombia
- Third place: Argentina
- Fourth place: Uruguay

Tournament statistics
- Matches played: 26
- Goals scored: 77 (2.96 per match)
- Top scorer: (Brazil) Joao Arthur (11 goals)

The 2011 South American Under-15 Football Championship (Spanish: Campeonato Sudamericano Sub-15 Uruguay 2011) was the 5th U-15 tournament for national teams affiliated with CONMEBOL. It was held in Uruguay from 17 November to 4 December 2011.

Brazil was the winning champion.

== Teams ==
- Argentina
- Bolivia
- Brazil
- Chile
- Colombia
- Ecuador
- Paraguay (holders)
- Peru
- Uruguay (hosts)
- Venezuela

== Venues ==
Three stadiums in three host cities were chosen for the tournament:

City	Stadium	Capacity
Trinidad	Estadio Juan Antonio Lavalleja	6.500
Rivera	Estadio Atilio Paiva Olivera	28.000
Fray Bentos	Estadio Municipal Parque Liebig's	6.000

== Draw ==
The draw of the first stage groups was held on 17 March 2011 during the CONMEBOL Executive Committee meeting at the CONMEBOL headquarters in Asunción, Paraguay.

== Officials ==
On 20 October 2011, CONMEBOL's Commission on Referees announced the list of 10 referees and assistant to be used for the tournament.

Officials

- (Argentina) Patricio Loustau
- (Bolivia) Jorge Mansilla
- (Brazil) Sandro Ricci
- (Chile) Eduardo Gamboa
- (Colombia) Adrián Vélez
- (Ecuador) José Luis Espinel
- (Paraguay) Enrique Cáceres
- (Peru) Henry Gambetta
- (Uruguay) Daniel Fedorczuk
- (Venezuela) José Argote

Assistants

- (Argentina) Juan Pablo Belatti
- (Bolivia) Wilson Arellano
- (Brazil) Marcelo Van Gasse
- (Chile) Marcelo Barraza
- (Colombia) Alexander Guzmán
- (Ecuador) Douglas Espinoza
- (Paraguay) Hugo Martínez
- (Peru) Raúl López Cruz
- (Uruguay) Nicolás Tarán
- (Venezuela) Carlos López

== First round ==
The 10 national teams were divided in 2 groups of 5 teams each. The top 2 teams in each group qualified for the final round.

=== Group A ===
Team	Pts	Pld	W	D	L	GF	GA
Uruguay	10	4	3	1	0	10	2
Argentina	7	4	2	1	1	5	6
Ecuador	5	4	1	2	1	5	2
Chile	4	4	1	1	2	4	7
Venezuela	1	4	0	1	3	2	9

17 November 2011
Chile	1 : 0	Ecuador	Estadio Municipal Parque Liebig's, Fray Bentos
Uruguay	2 : 1	Venezuela	Estadio Municipal Parque Liebig's, Fray Bentos
19 November 2011
Argentina	3 : 2	Chile	Estadio Municipal Parque Liebig's, Fray Bentos
Uruguay	1 : 1	Ecuador	Estadio Municipal Parque Liebig's, Fray Bentos
21 November 2011
Argentina	2 : 0	Venezuela	Estadio Municipal Parque Liebig's, Fray Bentos
Uruguay	3 : 0	Chile	Estadio Municipal Parque Liebig's, Fray Bentos
23 November 2011
Chile	1 : 1	Venezuela	Estadio Municipal Parque Liebig's, Fray Bentos
Argentina	0 : 0	Ecuador	Estadio Municipal Parque Liebig's, Fray Bentos
25 November 2011
Venezuela	0 : 4	Ecuador	Estadio Municipal Parque Liebig's, Fray Bentos
Uruguay	4 : 0	Argentina	Estadio Municipal Parque Liebig's, Fray Bentos

=== Group B ===
Team	Pts	Pld	W	D	L	GF	GA
Brazil	10	4	3	1	0	13	2
Colombia	8	4	2	2	0	4	0
Paraguay	6	4	2	0	2	5	4
Peru	4	4	1	1	2	3	7
Bolivia	0	4	0	0	4	3	15

18 November 2011
Brazil	0 : 0	Colombia	Estadio Atilio Paiva Olivera, Rivera
Paraguay	4 : 1	Bolivia	Estadio Atilio Paiva Olivera, Rivera
20 November 2011
Brazil	5 : 1	Peru	Estadio Atilio Paiva Olivera, Rivera
Colombia	3 : 0	Bolivia	Estadio Atilio Paiva Olivera, Rivera
22 November 2011
Bolivia	1 : 2	Peru	Estadio Atilio Paiva Olivera, Rivera
Colombia	1 : 0	Paraguay	Estadio Atilio Paiva Olivera, Rivera
24 November 2011
Brazil	6 : 1	Bolivia	Estadio Atilio Paiva Olivera, Rivera
Paraguay	1 : 0	Peru	Estadio Atilio Paiva Olivera, Rivera
26 November 2011
Peru	0 : 0	Colombia	Estadio Atilio Paiva Olivera, Rivera
Paraguay	0 : 2	Brazil	Estadio Atilio Paiva Olivera, Rivera

== Final round ==
The final round was played in a round robin system between the four best teams.

Team	Pts	Pld	W	D	L	GF	GA
Brazil	9	3	3	0	0	12	4
Colombia	6	3	2	0	1	6	6
Argentina	3	3	1	0	2	5	7
Uruguay	0	3	0	0	3	0	6

28 November 2011
Brazil	4 : 2	Argentina	Estadio Juan Antonio Lavalleja, Trinidad
Uruguay	0 : 1	Colombia	Estadio Juan Antonio Lavalleja, Trinidad
1 December 2011
Brazil	4 : 2	Colombia	Estadio Juan Antonio Lavalleja, Trinidad
Uruguay	0 : 1	Argentina	Estadio Juan Antonio Lavalleja, Trinidad
4 December 2011
Argentina	2 : 3	Colombia	Estadio Juan Antonio Lavalleja, Trinidad
Uruguay	0 : 4	Brazil	Estadio Juan Antonio Lavalleja, Trinidad

2011 South American Under-15 Football champions

Brazil
Third title
