= Montero, Bolivia =

Montero
- City & Municipality
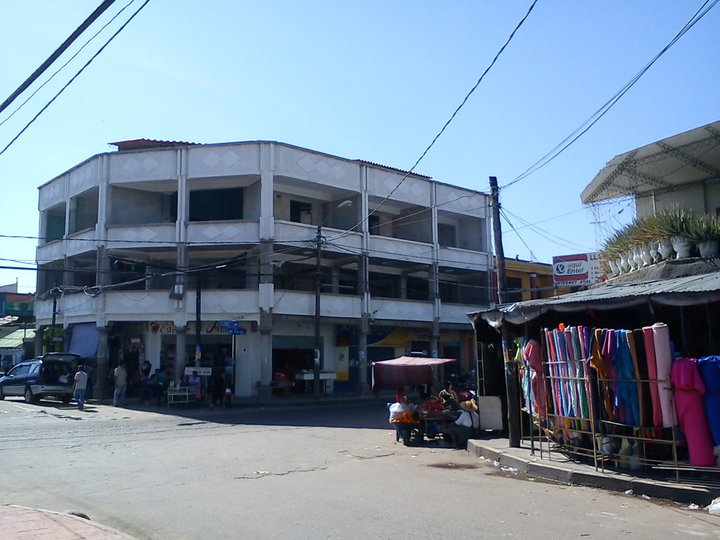

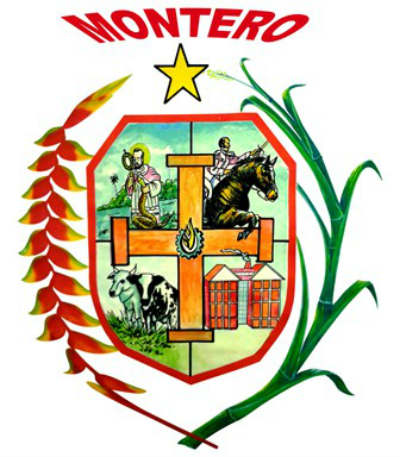
- Flag Seal

- Location in Bolivia
- Coordinates: 17°20′32″S 63°15′21″W
- Country: Bolivia
- Department: Santa Cruz Department
- Province: Obispo Santistevan Province
- Municipality: Montero Municipality
- Named: December 4, 1912

Area
  - City & Municipality: 280 km^{2} (110 sq mi)
- Elevation: 357 m (1,171 ft)

Population (2024 Census)
  - Urban: 126,093
- Time zone: UTC-4 (BOT)
- Postal code: 31001
- Area code: +591 4
- Website: Official website

Montero is a city and a municipality in Santa Cruz, Bolivia, about 50 km north of Santa Cruz de la Sierra. Montero had a population of 126,093 as of the 2024 census and has experienced growth in recent decades, becoming an important city in the region.

Montero has an elevation of about 300 meters above sea level and an average temperature of 23 °C (73.4 °F). The city is predominantly agricultural, producing soybeans, cotton, corn, and rice.

== Climate ==
Climate data for Montero (Montero Muyurina), elevation 217 m (712 ft), (1991–2013)
Month	Jan	Feb	Mar	Apr	May	Jun	Jul	Aug	Sep	Oct	Nov	Dec	Year
Mean daily maximum °C (°F)	32.0 (89.6)	31.5 (88.7)	31.6 (88.9)	30.7 (87.3)	28.1 (82.6)	26.8 (80.2)	27.2 (81.0)	29.5 (85.1)	31.3 (88.3)	32.3 (90.1)	32.4 (90.3)	32.1 (89.8)	30.5 (86.8)
Daily mean °C (°F)	26.9 (80.4)	26.6 (79.9)	26.5 (79.7)	24.9 (76.8)	22.6 (72.7)	21.4 (70.5)	21.1 (70.0)	22.9 (73.2)	24.7 (76.5)	26.2 (79.2)	26.5 (79.7)	26.8 (80.2)	24.8 (76.6)
Mean daily minimum °C (°F)	21.8 (71.2)	21.6 (70.9)	21.3 (70.3)	19.3 (66.7)	17.0 (62.6)	16.0 (60.8)	15.1 (59.2)	16.2 (61.2)	18.0 (64.4)	20.1 (68.2)	20.7 (69.3)	21.4 (70.5)	19.0 (66.3)
Average precipitation mm (inches)	207.7 (8.18)	207.3 (8.16)	110.0 (4.33)	83.0 (3.27)	63.6 (2.50)	59.5 (2.34)	36.5 (1.44)	32.8 (1.29)	61.2 (2.41)	112.9 (4.44)	149 (5.9)	184.8 (7.28)	1,308.3 (51.54)
Average precipitation days	12.0	12.0	9.0	6.4	5.5	5.3	3.5	2.7	4.0	6.2	7.8	11.4	85.8
Average relative humidity (%)	80.9	81.6	79.9	78.3	77.5	76.8	70.9	69.2	66.3	72.4	75.2	79.3	75.7
Source: Servicio Nacional de Meteorología e Hidrología de Bolivia
