= Uruguay national under-15 football team =

National association football team

Uruguay Under-15
- Nickname(s): Charrúas; La Celeste (The Sky Blue)
- Association: Asociación Uruguaya de Fútbol (Uruguayan Football Association)
- Confederation: CONMEBOL (South America)
- Head coach: Gustavo Bueno
- Captain: Joaquín Míguez
- FIFA code: URU
First colours	Second colours

FIFA U-15 World Cup & Festival
- Appearances: 1 (first in 2026)
- Best result: 10th (2026)

South American U-15 Championship
- Appearances: 10 (first in 2004)
- Best result: Runners-up (2007, 2015)

The Uruguay national under-15 football team, also known in Spanish as "sub-15", represents Uruguay in international under-15 football competitions and is overseen by the Uruguayan Football Association.

== Results and fixtures ==
The following is a list of match results in the last 12 months, as well as any future matches that have been scheduled.

Win Draw Loss

=== 2026 ===
14 July Friendly	Uruguay	1–0	Chile	Barros Blancos
		Report		Stadium: Complejo Celeste

16 July Friendly	Uruguay	1–2	Chile	Barros Blancos
		Report		Stadium: Complejo Celeste

19 August Friendly	Brazil	4–0	Uruguay	Teresópolis
		Report		Stadium: Granja Comary

22 August Friendly	Brazil	7–0	Uruguay	Teresópolis
		Report		Stadium: Granja Comary

8 September 2026 CONMEBOL Boys' U-15 Evolution League South Zone	Argentina	1–0	Uruguay	Asunción
		Report		Stadium: Parque Guasu Metropolitano

12 September 2026 CONMEBOL Boys' U-15 Evolution League South Zone	Chile	1–2	Uruguay	Asunción
		Report		Stadium: Parque Guasu Metropolitano

16 September 2026 CONMEBOL Boys' U-15 Evolution League South Zone	Uruguay	0–1	Paraguay	Asunción
		Report		Stadium: Parque Guasu Metropolitano

18 September 2026 CONMEBOL Boys' U-15 Evolution League South Zone	Uruguay	4–2	Bolivia	Asunción
		Report		Stadium: Parque Guasu Metropolitano

20 September 2026 CONMEBOL Boys' U-15 Evolution League Seventh-place match	Uruguay	0–0 (2–4 p)	Venezuela	Asunción
		Report		Stadium: Parque Guasu Metropolitano

24 October 2026 FIFA U-15 World Cup & Festival Group X	Uruguay	0–1	Moldova	Baku
		Report	Tudor Brinza 35'	Stadium: Hövsan Competition Complex

25 October 2026 FIFA U-15 World Cup & Festival Group X	Uruguay	3–1	Zambia	Baku
	Bautista González 9'; Thiago Guimaraens 24'; Santiago Larrosa 40'	Report	Moses Mukombwe 6'	Stadium: Hövsan Competition Complex

25 October 2026 FIFA U-15 World Cup & Festival Group X	Uruguay	4–2	Comoros	Baku
	Ignacio Echevarría 8'; Santiago Larrosa 16', 37', 40'	Report	Ali Ahamada 15', 33'	Stadium: Hövsan Competition Complex

26 October 2026 FIFA U-15 World Cup & Festival Group X	Tanzania	0–1	Uruguay	Baku
		Report	Luca Di Matteo 17'	Stadium: Hövsan Competition Complex

26 October 2026 FIFA U-15 World Cup & Festival Group X	Montserrat	0–12	Uruguay	Baku
		Report		Stadium: Hövsan Competition Complex

28 October 2026 FIFA U-15 World Cup & Festival Tier A - Round of 32	Uruguay	6–0	Estonia	Baku
		Report		Stadium: Hövsan Competition Complex

28 October 2026 FIFA U-15 World Cup & Festival Tier A - Round of 16	Greece	1–1 (4–2 p)	Uruguay	Baku
		Report		Stadium: Hövsan Competition Complex

29 October 2026 FIFA U-15 World Cup & Festival Tier A - 9th–16th quarter-finals	Uruguay	3–0	Egypt	Baku
		Report		Stadium: Hövsan Competition Complex

29 October 2026 FIFA U-15 World Cup & Festival Tier A - 9th–12th semi-finals	Poland	0–1	Uruguay	Baku
		Report		Stadium: Hövsan Competition Complex

30 October 2026 FIFA U-15 World Cup & Festival Tier A - 9th-place match	Mexico	3–1	Uruguay	Baku
		Report		Stadium: Hövsan Competition Complex

== Coaching staff ==
As of 29 August 2026

Position	Name
Head coach	(Uruguay) Gustavo Bueno
Assistant coach	(Uruguay) Álvaro González

== Players ==
=== Current squad ===
The following 14 players were named in the squad for the 2026 FIFA U-15 World Cup & Festival.

No.	Pos.	Player	Date of birth (age)	Club
1	GK	Thiago Carballo	2011 (age 14–15)	(Uruguayan Football Association) Peñarol
12	GK	Francisco Inciarte	11 September 2011 (age 15)	(Uruguayan Football Association) Nacional
2	DF	Bautista González	N/A	(Uruguayan Football Association) Racing Montevideo
3	DF	Joaquín Míguez (captain)	2011 (age 14–15)	(Uruguayan Football Association) Montevideo City Torque
4	DF	Luan Sosa	16 February 2011 (age 15)	(Uruguayan Football Association) Montevideo City Torque
6	DF	Ignacio Echevarría	10 February 2011 (age 15)	(Uruguayan Football Association) Montevideo City Torque
5	MF	Martín Sagasta	N/A	(Uruguayan Football Association) Defensor Sporting
8	MF	Luca Di Matteo	22 February 2011 (age 15)	(Uruguayan Football Association) Nacional
13	MF	Bautista Casco	28 October 2011 (age 15)	(Uruguayan Football Association) Liverpool Montevideo
14	MF	Santiago Mieres	23 September 2011 (age 15)	(Uruguayan Football Association) Nacional
7	FW	Thiago Guimaraens	24 April 2011 (age 15)	(Uruguayan Football Association) Nacional
9	FW	Kevin Miguelez	5 April 2011 (age 15)	(Uruguayan Football Association) Defensor Sporting
10	FW	Tiziano García	N/A	(Uruguayan Football Association) Racing Montevideo
11	FW	Santiago Larrosa	N/A	(Uruguayan Football Association) Montevideo City Torque

== See also ==
- Uruguay national football team
- Uruguay local national football team
- Uruguay national under-23 football team
- Uruguay national under-20 football team
- Uruguay national under-18 football team
- Uruguay national under-17 football team
- South American U-15 Championship
