= Paraguay men's national under-15 football team =

National association football team

Paraguay U-15
- Nickname(s): La Albirroja (The White and Red)
- Association: Paraguayan Football Association
- Confederation: CONMEBOL (South America)
- Head coach: (Paraguay) Gerardo González Aquino
- Home stadium: Defensores del Chaco
- FIFA code: PAR
First colours	Second colours

South American Under-15 Football Championship
- Appearances: 9 (first in 2004)
- Best result: Winners: 2004, 2009, 2023

The Paraguay national under-15 football team (Spanish: Selección de fútbol sub-15 del Paraguay), also known as Paraguay Sub-15 or Paraguay under-15, represents Paraguay in association football, at an under-15 age level and is controlled by the Paraguayan Football Association, the governing body for football in Paraguay.

== Titles ==
- South American U-15 Championship
  - Winners (3): 2004, 2009, 2023
