= 2017 South American U-17 Championship squads =

The 2017 South American U-17 Championship was an international football tournament held in Chile from 23 February to 19 March 2017. The ten national teams involved in the tournament were required to register a squad of 23 players; only players in these squads were eligible to take part in the tournament.

Each player had to have been born on or after 1 January 2000. All ages are as of 23 February 2017, the first day of the tournament.

Player names marked in bold have been capped at full international level.

== Group A ==
=== Bolivia ===
Head coach: Mauricio Soria

No.	Pos.	Player	Date of birth (age)	Club
1	GK	Bruno Rivas	22 August 2000 (aged 16)	(Bolivian Football Federation) Florida
2	DF	José Luis Temo	15 February 2000 (aged 17)	(Bolivian Football Federation) Calleja
3	DF	Ervin Montero	16 November 2000 (aged 16)	(Bolivian Football Federation) Blooming
4	DF	Adrián Sandoval	22 March 2000 (aged 16)	(Bolivian Football Federation) Máquina Vieja
5	DF	Carlos Chore	3 June 2000 (aged 16)	(Bolivian Football Federation) Calleja
6	MF	Daniel Rojas	22 February 2000 (aged 17)	(Bolivian Football Federation) Calleja
7	MF	Reinaldo Arancibia	15 January 2000 (aged 17)	(Bolivian Football Federation) Dínamo
8	MF	**Franz Gonzales**	26 June 2000 (aged 16)	(Bolivian Football Federation) Aurora
9	FW	Sebastián Melgar	16 July 2001 (aged 15)	(Argentine Football Association) Boca Juniors
10	MF	**John García**	13 April 2000 (aged 16)	(Bolivian Football Federation) Calleja
11	FW	**Jaume Cuéllar**	23 August 2001 (aged 15)	(Royal Spanish Football Federation) Barcelona Cadete A
12	GK	Mauricio Adorno	3 April 2001 (aged 15)	(Bolivian Football Federation) Dínamo
13	MF	Alan Siles	14 June 2000 (aged 16)	(Bolivian Football Federation) Blooming
14	DF	Alejandro Valeriano	22 February 2000 (aged 17)	(Bolivian Football Federation) Florida
15	MF	Limberth Mamani	20 August 2000 (aged 16)	(Bolivian Football Federation) Jorge Wilstermann
16	MF	Paolo Alcocer	3 September 2000 (aged 16)	(United States Soccer Federation) Orlando City
17	MF	Sebastián Galindo	29 July 2000 (aged 16)	(Bolivian Football Federation) Jorge Wilstermann
18	FW	Ferddy Roca	24 March 2000 (aged 16)	(Bolivian Football Federation) Oriente Petrolero
19	MF	**Adalid Terrazas**	25 August 2000 (aged 16)	(Bolivian Football Federation) Tiquipaya
20	FW	Roler Ferrufino	10 October 2000 (aged 16)	(Bolivian Football Federation) Florida
21	FW	Eduardo Velásquez	21 July 2000 (aged 16)	(Bolivian Football Federation) Pelota de Trapo
22	FW	Miguel Bengolea	13 September 2000 (aged 16)	(Bolivian Football Federation) Jorge Wilstermann
23	GK	Fabián Rojas	18 June 2000 (aged 16)	(Bolivian Football Federation) Sport Boys Warnes

=== Chile ===
Head coach: Hernán Caputto

No.	Pos.	Player	Date of birth (age)	Club
1	GK	Rodrigo Cancino	9 February 2000 (aged 17)	(Football Federation of Chile) Universidad de Chile
2	DF	Gastón Zúñiga	19 February 2000 (aged 17)	(Football Federation of Chile) O'Higgins
3	DF	Lucas Alarcón	5 March 2000 (aged 16)	(Football Federation of Chile) Universidad de Chile
4	DF	Nicolás Aravena	17 June 2000 (aged 16)	(Football Federation of Chile) Colo-Colo
5	DF	Yerco Oyanedel	19 September 2000 (aged 16)	(Football Federation of Chile) Universidad Católica
6	MF	Martín Lara	28 December 2000 (aged 16)	(Football Federation of Chile) Universidad Católica
7	FW	Nicolás Gutiérrez	28 January 2000 (aged 17)	(Football Federation of Chile) Palestino
8	MF	Tomás Espinoza	27 May 2001 (aged 15)	(Argentine Football Association) Rosario Central
9	FW	Zederick Vega	8 January 2000 (aged 17)	(Football Federation of Chile) Colo-Colo
10	MF	Branco Provoste	14 April 2000 (aged 16)	(Football Federation of Chile) Colo-Colo
11	FW	Pedro Campos	2 June 2000 (aged 16)	(Football Federation of Chile) Universidad Católica
12	GK	Julio Bórquez	20 April 2000 (aged 16)	(Football Federation of Chile) Deportes Iquique
13	FW	Willian Gama	30 June 2000 (aged 16)	(Football Federation of Chile) Santiago Wanderers
14	FW	**Diego Valencia**	14 January 2000 (aged 17)	(Football Federation of Chile) Universidad Católica
15	DF	Sebastián Valencia	13 February 2000 (aged 17)	(Football Federation of Chile) Colo-Colo
16	MF	Oliver Rojas	11 June 2000 (aged 16)	(Football Federation of Chile) Audax Italiano
17	DF	Matías Ferrari	8 January 2000 (aged 17)	(Football Federation of Chile) Colo-Colo
18	DF	Matías Silva	30 June 2000 (aged 16)	(Football Federation of Chile) Unión San Felipe
19	MF	Mauricio Morales	7 January 2000 (aged 17)	(Football Federation of Chile) Universidad de Chile
20	FW	Antonio Díaz	26 April 2000 (aged 16)	(Football Federation of Chile) O'Higgins
21	FW	Benjamín Cam	15 February 2000 (aged 17)	(Football Federation of Chile) Unión Española
22	GK	Hugo Araya	26 December 2000 (aged 16)	(Football Federation of Chile) Cobreloa
23	FW	Alexis Valencia	8 January 2001 (aged 16)	(Football Federation of Chile) Santiago Wanderers

=== Colombia ===
Head coach: Orlando Restrepo

No.	Pos.	Player	Date of birth (age)	Club
1	GK	Marlon Tunjano	28 May 2000 (aged 16)	(Colombian Football Federation) Once Caldas
2	DF	Andrés Balanta	18 January 2000 (aged 17)	(Colombian Football Federation) Deportivo Cali
3	DF	Kevin Moreno	23 July 2000 (aged 16)	(Colombian Football Federation) Deportivo Cali
4	DF	Christian Andrade	8 April 2000 (aged 16)	(Colombian Football Federation) Millonarios
5	DF	**Thomas Gutiérrez**	1 March 2000 (aged 16)	(Colombian Football Federation) Estudiantil
6	MF	**Andrés Perea**	14 November 2000 (aged 16)	(Colombian Football Federation) Atlético Nacional
7	FW	Juan David Martínez	30 May 2001 (aged 15)	(Colombian Football Federation) Cortuluá
8	MF	Luis Miguel López	8 November 2000 (aged 16)	(Colombian Football Federation) Independiente Santa Fe
9	FW	Santiago Barrero	26 February 2000 (aged 16)	(Colombian Football Federation) Atlético Rionegro 2010
10	MF	Brayan Gómez	29 January 2000 (aged 17)	(Colombian Football Federation) Atlético Nacional
11	FW	Juan Peñaloza	3 May 2000 (aged 16)	(Colombian Football Federation) Estudiantil
12	GK	**Kevin Mier**	18 May 2000 (aged 16)	(Colombian Football Federation) Atlético Nacional
13	DF	Robert Mejía	6 October 2000 (aged 16)	(Colombian Football Federation) Universitario Popayán
14	DF	Alejandro Arboleda	27 August 2000 (aged 16)	(Colombian Football Federation) Envigado
15	MF	Carlos Carranza	5 November 2000 (aged 16)	(Colombian Football Federation) Valledupar
16	MF	Fabián Ángel	10 January 2001 (aged 16)	(Colombian Football Federation) Barranquilla
17	DF	Juan Mateo Garavito	24 October 2000 (aged 16)	(Colombian Football Federation) Atlético Boca Juniors
18	MF	Steven Palomeque	7 June 2000 (aged 16)	(Colombian Football Federation) Estudiantil
19	FW	Juan David Vidal	16 September 2000 (aged 16)	(Colombian Football Federation) Barranquilla
20	FW	Heyler Gómez	27 May 2000 (aged 16)	(Colombian Football Federation) Orsomarso
21	MF	Wanderley Wandurraga	15 February 2000 (aged 17)	(Colombian Football Federation) Campohermoso
22	GK	Elson Mosquera	16 January 2000 (aged 17)	(Colombian Football Federation) Fortaleza CEIF
23	FW	**Jaminton Campaz**	24 May 2000 (aged 16)	(Colombian Football Federation) Deportes Tolima

=== Ecuador ===
Head coach: Gonzalo Alcocer

No.	Pos.	Player	Date of birth (age)	Club
1	GK	**Moisés Ramírez**	9 September 2000 (aged 16)	(Ecuadorian Football Federation) Independiente del Valle
2	DF	Joffre Monrroy	29 July 2000 (aged 16)	(Ecuadorian Football Federation) River Ecuador
3	DF	Mauricio Quiñónez	24 September 2000 (aged 16)	(Ecuadorian Football Federation) Independiente del Valle
4	DF	**Jackson Porozo**	4 August 2000 (aged 16)	(Ecuadorian Football Federation) Manta
5	MF	Joseph Espinoza	2 July 2000 (aged 16)	(Ecuadorian Football Federation) L.D.U. Quito
6	DF	Stephano Silva	5 September 2000 (aged 16)	(Ecuadorian Football Federation) Independiente del Valle
7	MF	Néstor Rivera	29 May 2000 (aged 16)	(Ecuadorian Football Federation) Manta
8	MF	César Parra	30 March 2000 (aged 16)	(Ecuadorian Football Federation) L.D.U. Quito
9	FW	Andrés Parrales	10 January 2000 (aged 17)	(Ecuadorian Football Federation) Macará
10	MF	Jordan Rezabala	29 February 2000 (aged 16)	(Ecuadorian Football Federation) Independiente del Valle
11	FW	Denilson Ovando	23 September 2001 (aged 15)	(Ecuadorian Football Federation) Independiente del Valle
12	GK	Julio César Cárdenas	11 September 2000 (aged 16)	(Ecuadorian Football Federation) L.D.U. Quito
13	DF	Bismark Sánchez	23 January 2000 (aged 17)	(Ecuadorian Football Federation) Aucas
14	MF	Kevin Sambonino	14 April 2000 (aged 16)	(Ecuadorian Football Federation) River Ecuador
15	MF	Ariel Hall	12 September 2000 (aged 16)	(Ecuadorian Football Federation) Orense
16	DF	Jhon Campos	30 October 2000 (aged 16)	(Ecuadorian Football Federation) El Nacional
17	MF	Kevin González	17 January 2000 (aged 17)	(Ecuadorian Football Federation) River Ecuador
18	FW	Gerly Delgado	28 March 2000 (aged 16)	(Ecuadorian Football Federation) Sporting Juncal
19	FW	Santiago Micolta	26 May 2000 (aged 16)	(Ecuadorian Football Federation) Fuerza Amarilla
20	FW	Cristian Tobar	5 July 2000 (aged 16)	(Ecuadorian Football Federation) Imbabura
21	DF	Juan Esteban Contreras	29 August 2000 (aged 16)	(Ecuadorian Football Federation) Clan Juvenil
22	GK	Alexis Villa	22 September 2001 (aged 15)	(Ecuadorian Football Federation) El Nacional
23	MF	William Piguave	25 February 2000 (aged 16)	(Ecuadorian Football Federation) Barcelona

=== Uruguay ===
Head coach: Alejandro Garay

No.	Pos.	Player	Date of birth (age)	Club
1	GK	Mauro Silveira	6 May 2000 (aged 16)	(Uruguayan Football Association) Montevideo Wanderers
2	DF	Jonathan González	22 June 2000 (aged 16)	(Uruguayan Football Association) Defensor Sporting
3	DF	Cristian Luna	26 January 2000 (aged 17)	(Uruguayan Football Association) Nacional
4	DF	Edgar Elizalde	27 February 2000 (aged 16)	(Uruguayan Football Association) Montevideo Wanderers
5	MF	Gastón Medina	13 September 2000 (aged 16)	(Uruguayan Football Association) Liverpool
6	MF	José Neris	13 March 2000 (aged 16)	(Uruguayan Football Association) River Plate
7	MF	**Juan Manuel Sanabria**	29 March 2000 (aged 16)	(Uruguayan Football Association) Nacional
8	MF	Gonzalo Nápoli	8 May 2000 (aged 16)	(Uruguayan Football Association) Defensor Sporting
9	FW	Gustavo Viera	21 October 2000 (aged 16)	(Uruguayan Football Association) Liverpool
10	MF	Santiago Rodríguez	8 January 2000 (aged 17)	(Uruguayan Football Association) Nacional
11	FW	**Facundo Torres**	13 April 2000 (aged 16)	(Uruguayan Football Association) Peñarol
12	GK	Nahuel Suárez	2 June 2000 (aged 16)	(Uruguayan Football Association) Defensor Sporting
13	DF	Brian Ferrares	1 March 2000 (aged 16)	(Uruguayan Football Association) Danubio
14	DF	Facundo Parada	28 January 2000 (aged 17)	(Uruguayan Football Association) Nacional
15	DF	Santiago Fernández	4 March 2000 (aged 16)	(Uruguayan Football Association) Montevideo Wanderers
16	MF	Alan Rodríguez	25 January 2000 (aged 17)	(Uruguayan Football Association) Defensor Sporting
17	MF	Thomás Chacón	17 August 2000 (aged 16)	(Uruguayan Football Association) Danubio
18	MF	Mateo Sena	30 March 2000 (aged 16)	(Uruguayan Football Association) Fénix
19	FW	Ezequiel Mechoso	23 March 2000 (aged 16)	(Uruguayan Football Association) Defensor Sporting
20	FW	Owen Falconis	25 February 2000 (aged 16)	(Uruguayan Football Association) Defensor Sporting
21	FW	Facundo Milán	3 February 2001 (aged 16)	(Uruguayan Football Association) Defensor Sporting
22	MF	**Brian Rodríguez**	24 January 2001 (aged 16)	(Uruguayan Football Association) Peñarol
23	GK	**Franco Israel**	22 April 2000 (aged 16)	(Uruguayan Football Association) Nacional

== Group B ==
=== Argentina ===
Head coach: Miguel Micó

No.	Pos.	Player	Date of birth (age)	Club
1	GK	Manuel Roffo	4 April 2000 (aged 16)	(Argentine Football Association) Boca Juniors
2	DF	**Nehuén Pérez**	24 June 2000 (aged 16)	(Argentine Football Association) Argentinos Juniors
3	DF	Laureano Grandis	21 January 2000 (aged 17)	(Argentine Football Association) Boca Juniors
4	DF	Marcelo Weigandt	11 January 2000 (aged 17)	(Argentine Football Association) Boca Juniors
5	MF	Nacho Pais	30 May 2000 (aged 16)	(Argentine Football Association) Racing
6	DF	Rodrigo Cavallera	23 February 2000 (aged 16)	(Argentine Football Association) San Lorenzo
7	FW	Benjamín Rollheiser	24 March 2000 (aged 16)	(Argentine Football Association) River Plate
8	MF	Fausto Vera	26 March 2000 (aged 16)	(Argentine Football Association) Argentinos Juniors
9	FW	Facundo Colidio	4 January 2000 (aged 17)	(Argentine Football Association) Boca Juniors
10	FW	Benjamín Garré	11 July 2000 (aged 16)	(The Football Association) Manchester City Academy
11	FW	Agustín Obando	11 March 2000 (aged 16)	(Argentine Football Association) Boca Juniors
12	GK	Mauricio Maslovski	15 March 2000 (aged 16)	(Argentine Football Association) Rosario Central
13	DF	Rodrigo Scagliarini	24 May 2000 (aged 16)	(Argentine Football Association) Newell's Old Boys
14	MF	Facundo Fernández	14 February 2000 (aged 17)	(Argentine Football Association) Boca Juniors
15	DF	Elías López	8 July 2000 (aged 16)	(Argentine Football Association) River Plate
16	DF	Rodrigo Sequeira	13 February 2000 (aged 17)	(Argentine Football Association) Boca Juniors
17	MF	Agustín Almendra	11 February 2000 (aged 17)	(Argentine Football Association) Boca Juniors
18	DF	Joan Mazzaco	25 April 2000 (aged 16)	(Argentine Football Association) Rosario Central
19	FW	Mauro García	15 February 2000 (aged 17)	(Argentine Football Association) Lanús
20	FW	Julián Carranza	22 May 2000 (aged 16)	(Argentine Football Association) Banfield
21	MF	Valentin Gasc	9 October 2000 (aged 16)	(Argentine Football Association) Lanús
22	MF	Valentin Barbero	13 July 2000 (aged 16)	(Argentine Football Association) Belgrano
23	GK	Leo Díaz	27 January 2000 (aged 17)	(Argentine Football Association) River Plate

=== Brazil ===
Head coach: Carlos Amadeu

No.	Pos.	Player	Date of birth (age)	Club
1	GK	Gabriel Brazão	5 October 2000 (aged 16)	(Brazilian Football Confederation) Cruzeiro
2	DF	David Wesley	13 March 2000 (aged 16)	(Brazilian Football Confederation) Flamengo
3	DF	Vitão	2 February 2000 (aged 17)	(Brazilian Football Confederation) Palmeiras
4	DF	Matheus Stockl	14 March 2000 (aged 16)	(Brazilian Football Confederation) Atlético Mineiro
5	MF	Victor Bobsin	12 January 2000 (aged 17)	(Brazilian Football Confederation) Grêmio
6	DF	Weverson	5 July 2000 (aged 16)	(Brazilian Football Confederation) São Paulo
7	FW	**Paulinho**	15 July 2000 (aged 16)	(Brazilian Football Confederation) Vasco da Gama
8	FW	Vitinho	4 January 2000 (aged 17)	(Brazilian Football Confederation) Corinthians
9	FW	Lincoln	16 December 2000 (aged 16)	(Brazilian Football Confederation) Flamengo
10	MF	Alan	8 March 2000 (aged 16)	(Brazilian Football Confederation) Palmeiras
11	FW	**Vinícius Júnior**	12 July 2000 (aged 16)	(Brazilian Football Confederation) Flamengo
12	GK	Lucão	26 February 2001 (aged 15)	(Brazilian Football Confederation) Vasco da Gama
13	DF	Rodrigo Guth	10 November 2000 (aged 16)	(Brazilian Football Confederation) Coritiba
14	DF	Lucas Halter	2 May 2000 (aged 16)	(Brazilian Football Confederation) Atlético Paranaense
15	DF	Patrick	28 February 2000 (aged 16)	(Brazilian Football Confederation) Flamengo
16	DF	Kazu	18 March 2000 (aged 16)	(Brazilian Football Confederation) Coritiba
17	MF	Victor Yan	9 April 2001 (aged 15)	(Brazilian Football Confederation) Santos
18	MF	Marcos Antônio	13 June 2000 (aged 16)	(Brazilian Football Confederation) Atlético Paranaense
19	FW	Alerrandro	12 January 2000 (aged 17)	(Brazilian Football Confederation) Atlético Mineiro
20	FW	Brenner	16 January 2000 (aged 17)	(Brazilian Football Confederation) São Paulo
21	MF	Rodrigo Nestor	9 August 2000 (aged 16)	(Brazilian Football Confederation) São Paulo
22	GK	Arthur Gazze	12 April 2000 (aged 16)	(Brazilian Football Confederation) São Paulo
23	FW	**Yuri Alberto**	18 March 2001 (aged 15)	(Brazilian Football Confederation) Santos

=== Paraguay ===
Head coach: Gustavo Morínigo

No.	Pos.	Player	Date of birth (age)	Club
1	GK	Ángel Roa	8 February 2000 (aged 17)	(Paraguayan Football Association) Olimpia
2	DF	Jesús Rolón	4 July 2000 (aged 16)	(Paraguayan Football Association) Olimpia
3	DF	Roberto Fernández	7 June 2000 (aged 16)	(Paraguayan Football Association) Guaraní
4	DF	Yair Méndez	31 August 2000 (aged 16)	(Paraguayan Football Association) Olimpia
5	DF	**Alexis Duarte**	12 March 2000 (aged 16)	(Paraguayan Football Association) Cerro Porteño
6	MF	**Braian Ojeda**	27 June 2000 (aged 16)	(Paraguayan Football Association) Olimpia
7	FW	Antonio Galeano	22 March 2000 (aged 16)	(Paraguayan Football Association) Rubio Ñu
8	MF	Stevens Gómez	8 January 2000 (aged 17)	(Paraguayan Football Association) Cerro Porteño
9	FW	Fernando Romero	24 April 2000 (aged 16)	(Paraguayan Football Association) Nacional
10	MF	Julio Báez	13 January 2000 (aged 17)	(Paraguayan Football Association) Cerro Porteño
11	FW	Martín Sánchez	27 January 2000 (aged 17)	(Paraguayan Football Association) Olimpia
12	GK	Aldo Pérez	3 November 2000 (aged 16)	(Paraguayan Football Association) Guaraní
13	DF	Marcelo Rolón	19 February 2000 (aged 17)	(Paraguayan Football Association) Libertad
14	DF	Rodrigo Quintero	15 July 2000 (aged 16)	(Paraguayan Football Association) Guaraní
15	DF	**Luis Zárate**	25 February 2000 (aged 16)	(Paraguayan Football Association) Libertad
16	FW	Ramón Zárate	10 June 2000 (aged 16)	(Paraguayan Football Association) Libertad
17	FW	Fernando Cardozo	8 February 2001 (aged 16)	(Paraguayan Football Association) Olimpia
18	FW	Blas Armoa	3 February 2000 (aged 17)	(Paraguayan Football Association) Sportivo Luqueño
19	FW	Nicolás Morínigo	9 March 2000 (aged 16)	(Paraguayan Football Association) Olimpia
20	MF	Giovanni Bogado	16 September 2001 (aged 15)	(Paraguayan Football Association) Libertad
21	DF	Alan Rodríguez	15 August 2000 (aged 16)	(Paraguayan Football Association) Cerro Porteño
22	GK	Jhonathan Martínez	12 March 2000 (aged 16)	(Paraguayan Football Association) Olimpia
23	MF	Víctor Villasanti	29 March 2000 (aged 16)	(Paraguayan Football Association) Guaraní

=== Peru ===
Head coach: Juan José Oré

No.	Pos.	Player	Date of birth (age)	Club
1	GK	Carlos Torres	12 June 2000 (aged 16)	(Peruvian Football Federation) Universidad de San Martín
2	DF	Adrián Gutierrez	20 February 2000 (aged 17)	(Peruvian Football Federation) C.A.R. de Ica
3	DF	Benjamín Villalta	24 July 2000 (aged 16)	(Peruvian Football Federation) Sporting Cristal
4	DF	Franz Schmidt	3 May 2000 (aged 16)	(Peruvian Football Federation) Universidad de San Martín
5	DF	Anthony Fuentes	24 February 2000 (aged 16)	(Peruvian Football Federation) Sport Huancayo
6	MF	Anthony Aoki	9 June 2000 (aged 16)	(Peruvian Football Federation) Sporting Cristal
7	MF	Fredy Oncoy	29 September 2000 (aged 16)	(Peruvian Football Federation) Esther Grande de Bentín
8	MF	Luis Cano	7 May 2000 (aged 16)	(Peruvian Football Federation) Universitario
9	FW	Gonzalo Sánchez	6 May 2000 (aged 16)	(Peruvian Football Federation) Alianza Lima
10	MF	Mauricio Matzuda	5 January 2000 (aged 17)	(Peruvian Football Federation) Esther Grande de Bentín
11	MF	Vasco Fry	30 July 2000 (aged 16)	(Peruvian Football Federation) Sporting Cristal
12	GK	Fabrizio Salazar	29 June 2000 (aged 16)	(Peruvian Football Federation) Alianza Lima
13	MF	Diego Nación	29 February 2000 (aged 16)	(Peruvian Football Federation) Universitario
14	MF	Fernando Melgar	8 March 2000 (aged 16)	(Peruvian Football Federation) Universidad de San Martín
15	DF	Steffano Medina	15 March 2000 (aged 16)	(Peruvian Football Federation) Los Blue Rays
16	MF	Leonardo Mifflin	4 January 2000 (aged 17)	(Peruvian Football Federation) Esther Grande de Bentín
17	FW	José Bolívar	17 January 2000 (aged 17)	(Peruvian Football Federation) Universidad de San Martín
18	MF	Nelson Cabanillas	8 February 2000 (aged 17)	(Peruvian Football Federation) Escuela Héctor Chumpitaz
19	FW	Renzo Galindo	17 February 2000 (aged 17)	(Peruvian Football Federation) Los Blue Rays
20	MF	Diego Temoche	2 April 2000 (aged 16)	(Peruvian Football Federation) Universitario
21	GK	Édgar Schottland	5 July 2000 (aged 16)	(Peruvian Football Federation) Universidad César Vallejo
22	DF	Fabricio Aragón	7 September 2000 (aged 16)	(Peruvian Football Federation) Universitario
23	FW	Paulo Gallardo	29 January 2001 (aged 16)	(Peruvian Football Federation) Sporting Cristal

=== Venezuela ===
Head coach: José Hernández

No.	Pos.	Player	Date of birth (age)	Club
1	GK	Miguel Silva	9 July 2000 (aged 16)	(Venezuelan Football Federation) Deportivo La Guaira
2	DF	Diego Luna	2 January 2000 (aged 17)	(Venezuelan Football Federation) LALA
3	DF	Pronswell Fernández	3 April 2000 (aged 16)	(Venezuelan Football Federation) Deportivo La Guaira
4	DF	Junior Moreno	3 March 2000 (aged 16)	(Venezuelan Football Federation) Trujillanos
5	MF	**Christian Makoun**	5 March 2000 (aged 16)	(Venezuelan Football Federation) Zamora
6	DF	Eduardo Fereira	29 September 2000 (aged 16)	(Venezuelan Football Federation) Escuela Secasports
7	FW	**Jan Carlos Hurtado**	5 March 2000 (aged 16)	(Venezuelan Football Federation) Deportivo Táchira
8	MF	Carlos Rodríguez	27 July 2000 (aged 16)	(Venezuelan Football Federation) Atlético Venezuela
9	FW	José Barragán	13 May 2000 (aged 16)	(Colombian Football Federation) Patriotas
10	MF	Jorge Echeverría	13 February 2000 (aged 17)	(Venezuelan Football Federation) Caracas
11	MF	Brayan Palmezano	17 September 2000 (aged 16)	(Venezuelan Football Federation) Zulia
12	GK	Manuel Sanhouse	23 January 2000 (aged 17)	(Venezuelan Football Federation) Deportivo Táchira
13	DF	Rommell Ibarra	24 March 2000 (aged 16)	(Venezuelan Football Federation) Deportivo La Guaira
14	DF	Adrián Zambrano	21 May 2000 (aged 16)	(Venezuelan Football Federation) Zulia
15	DF	Marco Gómez	19 April 2000 (aged 16)	(Venezuelan Football Federation) Zulia
16	MF	Keyner De Vasconcelos	24 February 2000 (aged 16)	(Venezuelan Football Federation) Atlético Venezuela
17	MF	Sebastián Chalbaud	26 September 2000 (aged 16)	(Venezuelan Football Federation) Escuela Secasports
18	MF	**Cristian Cásseres**	20 January 2000 (aged 17)	(Venezuelan Football Federation) Deportivo La Guaira
19	MF	**Jorge Yriarte**	4 March 2000 (aged 16)	(Venezuelan Football Federation) Deportivo Lara
20	FW	Danny Pérez	23 January 2000 (aged 17)	(Venezuelan Football Federation) Deportivo La Guaira
21	MF	Octavio Páez	28 February 2000 (aged 16)	(Venezuelan Football Federation) Academia Emeritense
22	GK	Carlos Olses	5 September 2000 (aged 16)	(Venezuelan Football Federation) Deportivo La Guaira
23	FW	Manuel Godoy	21 January 2000 (aged 17)	(Venezuelan Football Federation) Deportivo Lara
