= Andrés González =

Andrés González may refer to:

- Andrés González (bishop) (1634–1709), Roman Catholic bishop
- Andrés González de Barcia (born 1743), Spanish historian
- Andrés González Muñoz (1840-1898), Cuban politician
- Andrés González (footballer, born 1984), Colombian football midfielder
- Andrés González (footballer, born 2006), Colombian football forward for Remo
- Andrés González (gymnast) (born 1945), Cuban Olympic gymnast
- Andrés José González (born 1989), Argentine swimmer
- Andrés González (Spanish footballer) (born 1988), Spanish football right-back for La Calzada
- Andrés González (Peruvian footballer) (born 1968), Peruvian football forward
- Andrés González Díaz (born 1955), Colombian diplomat
- Universo 2000 (Andrés Reyes González, 1963–2018), Mexican wrestler
- Andrés González (footballer, born 1990), Venezuelan football goalkeeper
