= List of Burgos CF players =

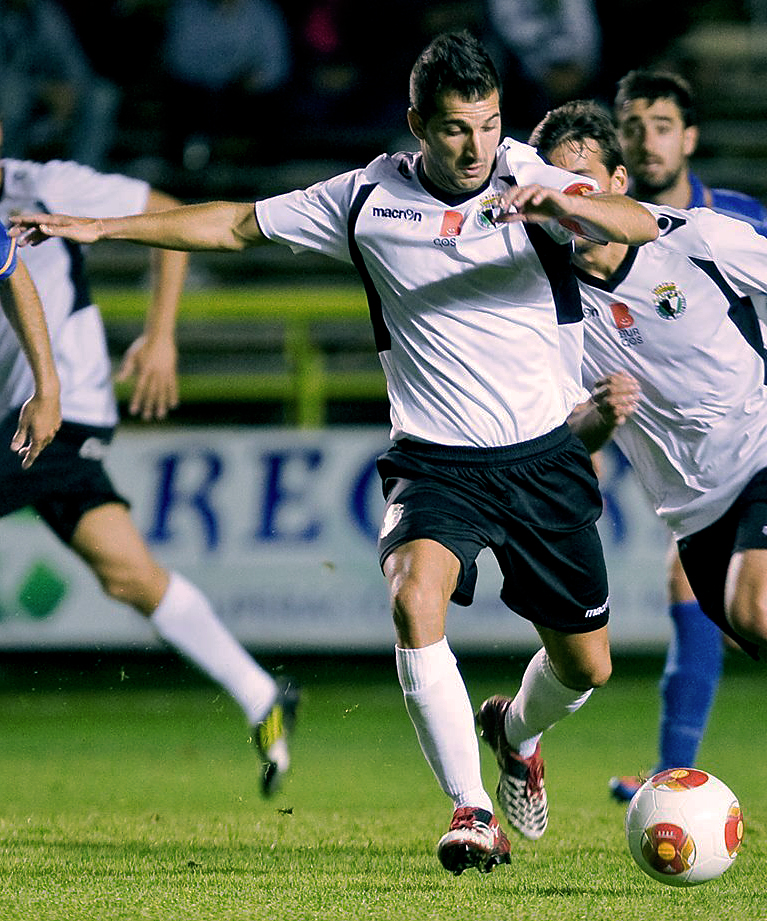
Fernando Carralero is the top goalscorer with the club

This is the list of notable footballers who have played for Burgos CF since its re-foundation in 1994. Generally, this means players that have played 100 or more league matches for the club. However, some players who have played fewer matches are also included; this includes international players at the club and some players who fell short of the 100 total but made significant contributions to the club's history or in their careers.

Appearances and goals include Segunda División, Segunda División B and Tercera División games without playoffs since 1997. Substitute appearances are included.

Statistics are correct as of the end of the 2016–17 season.

== Key ==
**Name in bold**	Currently playing at Burgos

== Players ==
Name	Pos.	BCF career	Apps	Goals
Lucio	DF	1997–2007	316	8
Aurreko	GK	2004–2017	265	0
**Andrés**	DF	2007–2009; 2013–	249	2
Enric Maureta	MF	2008–2015	221	13
Fernando Colina	DF	2009–2012	141	10
Raúl García	DF	2002–2005; 2006–2007	133	2
Sergio Torres	MF	2010–2014	121	1
Iñaki	DF	2000–2003; 2009	118	15
Galder Zubizarreta	DF	2000–2002; 2003–2007	114	5
César Esteban	DF	1998–2002	112	29
Repi	DF	1998–2002	105	0
Fernando Carralero	FW	2012–2015	105	35
Adrián	FW	2015–2018	103	31
Daniel Pendín	FW	1999–2002	90	14
Asier Goiria	FW	2004–2007	70	28
Asier Garitano	MF	1998–2000	58	19
Aritz Aduriz	FW	2003–2004	36	16
Dmitri Cheryshev	FW	2001–2002	23	1
