= Carlos Eduardo Rodríguez =

Carlos Eduardo Rodríguez may refer to:

- Carlos Rodríguez (fencer) (born 1978), Venezuelan fencer
- Carlos Eduardo Rodríguez (footballer) (born 2000), Venezuelan footballer
