= 2011 Copa América squads =

The 2011 Copa América was an international football tournament held in Argentina from 1 to 24 July 2011. The twelve national teams involved in the tournament were required to register a squad of 22 players, or 23 players if the team chooses to have three goalkeepers; only players in these squads were eligible to take part in the tournament. Each nation's squad of players will be given shirt numbers 1–23.

Number of caps, goals, players' club teams and players' age as of 1 July 2011 – the tournament's opening day.

== Group A ==
=== Argentina ===
Head coach: Sergio Batista

No.	Pos.	Player	Date of birth (age)	Caps	Goals	Club
1	GK	Juan Pablo Carrizo	6 May 1984 (aged 27)	12	0	(Argentine Football Association) River Plate
2	DF	Ezequiel Garay	10 October 1986 (aged 24)	3	0	(Royal Spanish Football Federation) Real Madrid
3	MF	Pablo Zabaleta	16 January 1985 (aged 26)	11	0	(The Football Association) Manchester City
4	DF	Nicolás Burdisso	12 April 1981 (aged 30)	40	2	(Italian Football Federation) Roma
5	MF	Esteban Cambiasso	18 August 1980 (aged 30)	50	5	(Italian Football Federation) Inter Milan
6	DF	Gabriel Milito	7 September 1980 (aged 30)	38	1	(Royal Spanish Football Federation) Barcelona
7	MF	Ángel Di María	14 February 1988 (aged 23)	20	3	(Royal Spanish Football Federation) Real Madrid
8	DF	Javier Zanetti	10 August 1973 (aged 37)	141	5	(Italian Football Federation) Inter Milan
9	FW	Gonzalo Higuaín	10 December 1987 (aged 23)	13	7	(Royal Spanish Football Federation) Real Madrid
10	FW	Lionel Messi	24 June 1987 (aged 24)	56	17	(Royal Spanish Football Federation) Barcelona
11	FW	Carlos Tevez	5 February 1984 (aged 27)	59	13	(The Football Association) Manchester City
12	GK	Mariano Andújar	30 July 1983 (aged 27)	6	0	(Italian Football Federation) Catania
13	DF	Nicolás Pareja	19 January 1984 (aged 27)	1	0	(Russian Football Union) Spartak Moscow
14	DF	Javier Mascherano (captain)	8 June 1984 (aged 27)	69	2	(Royal Spanish Football Federation) Barcelona
15	MF	Lucas Biglia	30 January 1986 (aged 25)	4	0	(Royal Belgian Football Association) Anderlecht
16	FW	Sergio Agüero	2 June 1988 (aged 23)	26	10	(Royal Spanish Football Federation) Atlético Madrid
17	DF	Marcos Rojo	20 March 1990 (aged 21)	4	0	(Russian Football Union) Spartak Moscow
18	MF	Javier Pastore	20 June 1989 (aged 22)	8	0	(Italian Football Federation) Palermo
19	MF	Éver Banega	29 June 1988 (aged 23)	9	0	(Royal Spanish Football Federation) Valencia
20	MF	Fernando Gago	10 April 1986 (aged 25)	31	0	(Royal Spanish Football Federation) Real Madrid
21	FW	Ezequiel Lavezzi	3 May 1985 (aged 26)	12	1	(Italian Football Federation) Napoli
22	FW	Diego Milito	12 June 1979 (aged 32)	24	4	(Italian Football Federation) Inter Milan
23	GK	Sergio Romero	22 February 1987 (aged 24)	17	0	(Royal Dutch Football Association) AZ

=== Bolivia ===
Head coach: Gustavo Quinteros

No.	Pos.	Player	Date of birth (age)	Caps	Goals	Club
1	GK	Carlos Erwin Arias	27 April 1980 (aged 31)	33	0	(Israel Football Association) Maccabi Netanya
2	DF	Miguel Ángel Hoyos	11 March 1981 (aged 30)	28	1	(Bolivian Football Federation) Oriente Petrolero
3	DF	Luis Gutiérrez	15 January 1985 (aged 26)	18	0	(Bolivian Football Federation) Oriente Petrolero
4	MF	Lorgio Álvarez	29 June 1978 (aged 33)	35	1	(Bolivian Football Federation) Bolívar
5	DF	Ronald Rivero	29 January 1980 (aged 31)	19	0	(Bolivian Football Federation) Bolívar
6	MF	Wálter Flores	29 October 1978 (aged 32)	20	0	(Bolivian Football Federation) Bolívar
7	FW	Edivaldo Hermoza	17 November 1985 (aged 25)	2	0	(Portuguese Football Federation) Naval
8	MF	Ronald García	17 December 1980 (aged 30)	34	2	(Bolivian Football Federation) Bolívar
9	FW	Marcelo Moreno	18 June 1987 (aged 24)	22	8	(Ukrainian Association of Football) Shakhtar Donetsk
10	MF	Joselito Vaca	12 August 1982 (aged 28)	44	2	(Bolivian Football Federation) Oriente Petrolero
11	FW	Alcides Peña	14 January 1989 (aged 22)	3	0	(Bolivian Football Federation) Oriente Petrolero
12	GK	Daniel Vaca	3 November 1978 (aged 32)	3	0	(Bolivian Football Federation) The Strongest
13	DF	Santos Amador	6 April 1982 (aged 29)	4	0	(Bolivian Football Federation) Nacional Potosí
14	DF	Christian Vargas	9 August 1983 (aged 27)	3	0	(Bolivian Football Federation) San José
15	MF	Jaime Robles	2 February 1978 (aged 33)	16	0	(Bolivian Football Federation) Aurora
16	DF	Ronald Raldes (captain)	20 April 1981 (aged 30)	55	0	(Argentine Football Association) Colón
17	FW	Juan Carlos Arce	10 April 1985 (aged 26)	20	4	(Bolivian Football Federation) Oriente Petrolero
18	FW	Ricardo Pedriel	19 January 1987 (aged 24)	12	2	(Turkish Football Federation) Sivasspor
19	MF	José Luis Chávez	18 May 1986 (aged 25)	4	0	(Bolivian Football Federation) Blooming
20	FW	Mauricio Saucedo	14 August 1985 (aged 25)	12	0	(Bolivian Football Federation) Oriente Petrolero
21	MF	Jhasmani Campos	10 May 1988 (aged 23)	14	1	(Bolivian Football Federation) Oriente Petrolero
22	MF	Rudy Cardozo	14 February 1990 (aged 21)	6	0	(Bolivian Football Federation) Bolívar
23	GK	Sergio Galarza	25 August 1975 (aged 35)	14	0	(Bolivian Football Federation) Blooming

=== Colombia ===
Head coach: Hernán Darío Gómez

No.	Pos.	Player	Date of birth (age)	Caps	Goals	Club
1	GK	Nelson Ramos	23 November 1981 (aged 29)	0	0	(Colombian Football Federation) Millonarios
2	DF	Cristián Zapata	30 September 1986 (aged 24)	14	0	(Italian Football Federation) Udinese
3	DF	Mario Yepes (captain)	13 January 1976 (aged 35)	78	4	(Italian Football Federation) Milan
4	MF	Gustavo Bolívar	16 April 1985 (aged 26)	2	0	(Colombian Football Federation) Deportes Tolima
5	MF	Yulián Anchico	28 May 1984 (aged 27)	30	1	(Mexican Football Federation) Pachuca
6	MF	Carlos Sánchez	6 February 1986 (aged 25)	19	1	(French Football Federation) Valenciennes
7	DF	Pablo Armero	2 November 1986 (aged 24)	22	0	(Italian Football Federation) Udinese
8	MF	Abel Aguilar	6 January 1985 (aged 26)	25	5	(Royal Spanish Football Federation) Hércules
9	FW	Radamel Falcao	10 February 1986 (aged 25)	30	7	(Portuguese Football Federation) Porto
10	MF	Juan Cuadrado	26 May 1988 (aged 23)	8	1	(Italian Football Federation) Udinese
11	FW	Hugo Rodallega	25 July 1985 (aged 25)	38	8	(The Football Association) Wigan Athletic
12	GK	Neco Martínez	11 July 1982 (aged 28)	10	1	(Colombian Football Federation) Once Caldas
13	MF	Fredy Guarín	30 June 1986 (aged 25)	30	1	(Portuguese Football Federation) Porto
14	DF	Luis Amaranto Perea	30 January 1979 (aged 32)	54	0	(Royal Spanish Football Federation) Atlético Madrid
15	DF	Juan David Valencia	15 January 1986 (aged 25)	6	0	(Colombian Football Federation) Atlético Junior
16	MF	Elkin Soto	4 August 1980 (aged 30)	18	6	(German Football Association) Mainz 05
17	MF	Dayro Moreno	16 September 1985 (aged 25)	17	2	(Colombian Football Federation) Once Caldas
18	DF	Juan Camilo Zúñiga	14 December 1985 (aged 25)	30	0	(Italian Football Federation) Napoli
19	FW	Teófilo Gutiérrez	27 May 1985 (aged 26)	7	2	(Argentine Football Association) Racing
20	FW	Adrián Ramos	22 January 1986 (aged 25)	15	1	(German Football Association) Hertha BSC
21	FW	Jackson Martínez	3 October 1986 (aged 24)	8	4	(Mexican Football Federation) Chiapas
22	DF	Aquivaldo Mosquera	22 June 1981 (aged 30)	19	1	(Mexican Football Federation) América
23	GK	Bréiner Castillo	5 May 1978 (aged 33)	4	0	(Colombian Football Federation) Independiente Medellín

=== Costa Rica ===
Head coach: (Argentina) Ricardo La Volpe

No.	Pos.	Player	Date of birth (age)	Caps	Goals	Club
1	GK	Minor Álvarez	14 November 1989 (aged 21)	0	0	(Costa Rican Football Federation) Saprissa
2	DF	Francisco Calvo	8 July 1992 (aged 18)	0	0	(United States Soccer Federation) San Jacinto College
3	DF	Jhonny Acosta	21 July 1983 (aged 27)	5	0	(Costa Rican Football Federation) Alajuelense
4	DF	José Salvatierra	10 October 1989 (aged 21)	3	0	(Costa Rican Football Federation) Alajuelense
5	MF	Luis Miguel Valle	11 May 1989 (aged 22)	0	0	(Costa Rican Football Federation) Alajuelense
6	DF	Heiner Mora	20 June 1984 (aged 27)	13	1	(Costa Rican Football Federation) Santos de Guápiles
7	DF	Allen Guevara	16 April 1989 (aged 22)	6	0	(Costa Rican Football Federation) Alajuelense
8	MF	David Guzmán	18 February 1990 (aged 21)	8	0	(Costa Rican Football Federation) Saprissa
9	FW	Jorge Castro	11 September 1990 (aged 20)	0	0	(Costa Rican Football Federation) Universidad de Costa Rica
10	FW	Randall Brenes (captain)	12 August 1983 (aged 27)	11	4	(Costa Rican Football Federation) Cartaginés
11	MF	Diego Madrigal	19 March 1989 (aged 22)	9	1	(Paraguayan Football Association) Cerro Porteño
12	FW	Joel Campbell	10 February 1992 (aged 19)	3	1	(Costa Rican Football Federation) Puntarenas
13	GK	Danny Carvajal	12 April 1990 (aged 21)	0	0	(Costa Rican Football Federation) Brujas
14	MF	Hansell Arauz	9 August 1989 (aged 21)	0	0	(Costa Rican Football Federation) Barrio México
15	DF	Jorge Gatgens	23 July 1988 (aged 22)	0	0	(Costa Rican Football Federation) Pérez Zeledón
16	MF	Kevin Fajardo	5 September 1989 (aged 21)	0	0	(Costa Rican Football Federation) Santos de Guápiles
17	FW	Josué Martínez	25 March 1990 (aged 21)	12	1	(Costa Rican Football Federation) Saprissa
18	GK	Leonel Moreira	2 April 1990 (aged 21)	0	0	(Costa Rican Football Federation) Herediano
19	DF	Óscar Duarte	3 June 1989 (aged 22)	3	0	(Costa Rican Football Federation) Saprissa
20	DF	Pedro Leal	31 January 1989 (aged 22)	3	0	(Costa Rican Football Federation) Puntarenas
21	FW	César Elizondo	10 February 1988 (aged 23)	6	0	(Costa Rican Football Federation) Pérez Zeledón
22	MF	José Miguel Cubero	14 February 1987 (aged 24)	8	0	(Costa Rican Football Federation) Herediano
23	DF	Gilberto Martínez	1 October 1979 (aged 31)	61	0	(Italian Football Federation) Sampdoria

== Group B ==
=== Brazil ===
Head coach: Mano Menezes

No.	Pos.	Player	Date of birth (age)	Caps	Goals	Club
1	GK	Júlio César	3 September 1979 (aged 31)	56	0	(Italian Football Federation) Inter Milan
2	DF	Dani Alves	6 May 1983 (aged 28)	47	5	(Royal Spanish Football Federation) Barcelona
3	DF	Lúcio (captain)	8 May 1978 (aged 33)	99	4	(Italian Football Federation) Inter Milan
4	DF	Thiago Silva	22 September 1984 (aged 26)	14	0	(Italian Football Federation) Milan
5	MF	Lucas Leiva	9 January 1987 (aged 24)	12	0	(The Football Association) Liverpool
6	DF	André Santos	8 March 1983 (aged 28)	17	0	(Turkish Football Federation) Fenerbahçe
7	FW	Robinho	25 January 1984 (aged 27)	86	25	(Italian Football Federation) Milan
8	MF	Ramires	24 March 1987 (aged 24)	22	2	(The Football Association) Chelsea
9	FW	Alexandre Pato	2 September 1989 (aged 21)	12	4	(Italian Football Federation) Milan
10	MF	Ganso	12 October 1989 (aged 21)	1	0	(Brazilian Football Confederation) Santos
11	FW	Neymar	5 February 1992 (aged 19)	5	3	(Brazilian Football Confederation) Santos
12	GK	Victor	21 January 1983 (aged 28)	5	0	(Brazilian Football Confederation) Grêmio
13	DF	Maicon	26 July 1981 (aged 29)	64	6	(Italian Football Federation) Inter Milan
14	DF	Luisão	13 February 1981 (aged 30)	43	3	(Portuguese Football Federation) Benfica
15	MF	Sandro	15 March 1989 (aged 22)	7	0	(The Football Association) Tottenham Hotspur
16	MF	Elano	14 June 1981 (aged 30)	47	9	(Brazilian Football Confederation) Santos
17	MF	Elias	16 May 1985 (aged 26)	7	0	(Royal Spanish Football Federation) Atlético Madrid
18	MF	Lucas Moura	13 August 1992 (aged 18)	3	0	(Brazilian Football Confederation) São Paulo
19	FW	Fred	3 October 1983 (aged 27)	11	5	(Brazilian Football Confederation) Fluminense
20	MF	Jádson	22 October 1983 (aged 27)	3	0	(Ukrainian Association of Football) Shakhtar Donetsk
21	DF	Adriano	26 October 1984 (aged 26)	10	0	(Royal Spanish Football Federation) Barcelona
22	GK	Jefferson	30 July 1983 (aged 27)	0	0	(Brazilian Football Confederation) Botafogo
23	DF	David Luiz	22 April 1987 (aged 24)	6	0	(The Football Association) Chelsea

=== Ecuador ===
Head coach: (Colombia) Reinaldo Rueda

No.	Pos.	Player	Date of birth (age)	Caps	Goals	Club
1	GK	Marcelo Elizaga	19 April 1972 (aged 39)	20	0	(Ecuadorian Football Federation) Deportivo Quito
2	DF	Geovanny Caicedo	28 March 1981 (aged 30)	6	0	(Ecuadorian Football Federation) LDU Quito
3	DF	Frickson Erazo	5 May 1988 (aged 23)	5	1	(Ecuadorian Football Federation) El Nacional
4	DF	Luis Checa	21 December 1983 (aged 27)	9	0	(Ecuadorian Football Federation) Deportivo Quito
5	MF	Oswaldo Minda	26 July 1983 (aged 27)	11	0	(Ecuadorian Football Federation) Deportivo Quito
6	MF	Christian Noboa	9 April 1985 (aged 26)	17	2	(Russian Football Union) Rubin Kazan
7	FW	Michael Arroyo	23 April 1987 (aged 24)	12	2	(Mexican Football Federation) San Luis
8	FW	Édison Méndez	16 March 1979 (aged 32)	101	18	(Ecuadorian Football Federation) Emelec
9	FW	Felipe Caicedo	5 September 1988 (aged 22)	29	3	(Royal Spanish Football Federation) Levante
10	MF	Walter Ayoví (captain)	11 August 1979 (aged 31)	59	7	(Mexican Football Federation) Monterrey
11	FW	Christian Benítez	1 May 1986 (aged 25)	38	16	(Mexican Football Federation) Santos Laguna
12	GK	Máximo Banguera	16 December 1985 (aged 25)	11	0	(Ecuadorian Football Federation) Barcelona
13	DF	Néicer Reasco	23 July 1977 (aged 33)	53	0	(Ecuadorian Football Federation) LDU Quito
14	MF	Segundo Castillo	15 May 1982 (aged 29)	53	3	(Ecuadorian Football Federation) Deportivo Quito
15	MF	David Quiroz	8 September 1982 (aged 28)	24	0	(Ecuadorian Football Federation) Emelec
16	MF	Antonio Valencia	4 August 1985 (aged 25)	46	5	(The Football Association) Manchester United
17	FW	Edson Montaño	15 March 1991 (aged 20)	2	0	(Royal Belgian Football Association) Gent
18	DF	Geovanny Nazareno	17 January 1988 (aged 23)	8	0	(Ecuadorian Football Federation) Barcelona
19	DF	Norberto Araujo	13 October 1978 (aged 32)	1	0	(Ecuadorian Football Federation) LDU Quito
20	DF	Diego Calderón	26 October 1986 (aged 24)	2	0	(Ecuadorian Football Federation) LDU Quito
21	DF	Gabriel Achilier	24 March 1985 (aged 26)	1	0	(Ecuadorian Football Federation) Emelec
22	GK	Alexander Domínguez	5 June 1987 (aged 24)	1	0	(Ecuadorian Football Federation) LDU Quito
23	FW	Narciso Mina	25 November 1982 (aged 28)	7	0	(Ecuadorian Football Federation) Independiente del Valle

=== Paraguay ===
Head coach: (Argentina) Gerardo Martino

No.	Pos.	Player	Date of birth (age)	Caps	Goals	Club
1	GK	Justo Villar (captain)	30 June 1977 (aged 34)	89	0	(Royal Spanish Football Federation) Valladolid
2	DF	Darío Verón	26 July 1979 (aged 31)	38	0	(Mexican Football Federation) UNAM
3	DF	Iván Piris	10 March 1989 (aged 22)	0	0	(Paraguayan Football Association) Cerro Porteño
4	DF	Elvis Marecos	15 February 1980 (aged 31)	4	1	(Paraguayan Football Association) Guaraní
5	DF	Antolín Alcaraz	30 July 1982 (aged 28)	15	1	(The Football Association) Wigan Athletic
6	DF	Marcos Cáceres	5 May 1986 (aged 25)	12	0	(Argentine Football Association) Racing
7	FW	Pablo Zeballos	4 March 1986 (aged 25)	4	1	(Paraguayan Football Association) Olimpia
8	MF	Édgar Barreto	15 July 1984 (aged 26)	55	3	(Italian Football Federation) Atalanta
9	FW	Roque Santa Cruz	16 August 1981 (aged 29)	83	24	(The Football Association) Blackburn Rovers
10	MF	Osvaldo Martínez	8 April 1986 (aged 25)	22	1	(Mexican Football Federation) Monterrey
11	MF	Jonathan Santana	19 October 1981 (aged 29)	27	0	(Turkish Football Federation) Kayserispor
12	GK	Diego Barreto	16 July 1981 (aged 29)	7	0	(Paraguayan Football Association) Cerro Porteño
13	MF	Enrique Vera	10 March 1979 (aged 32)	46	4	(Ecuadorian Football Federation) LDU Quito
14	DF	Paulo da Silva	1 February 1980 (aged 31)	89	2	(Royal Spanish Football Federation) Zaragoza
15	MF	Víctor Cáceres	25 March 1985 (aged 26)	36	0	(Paraguayan Football Association) Libertad
16	MF	Cristian Riveros	16 October 1982 (aged 28)	64	12	(The Football Association) Sunderland
17	DF	Aureliano Torres	16 June 1982 (aged 29)	40	2	(Argentine Football Association) San Lorenzo
18	FW	Nelson Valdez	28 November 1983 (aged 27)	48	11	(Royal Spanish Football Federation) Hércules
19	FW	Lucas Barrios	13 November 1984 (aged 26)	15	5	(German Football Association) Borussia Dortmund
20	MF	Néstor Ortigoza	7 October 1984 (aged 26)	12	0	(Argentine Football Association) San Lorenzo
21	MF	Marcelo Estigarribia	21 September 1987 (aged 23)	17	1	(Argentine Football Association) Newell's Old Boys
22	GK	Gatito Fernández	29 March 1988 (aged 23)	0	0	(Argentine Football Association) Racing
23	MF	Hernán Pérez	25 February 1989 (aged 22)	10	0	(Royal Spanish Football Federation) Villarreal B

=== Venezuela ===
Head coach: César Farías

No.	Pos.	Player	Date of birth (age)	Caps	Goals	Club
1	GK	Renny Vega	4 July 1979 (aged 31)	47	0	(Venezuelan Football Federation) Caracas
2	DF	José Luis Granados	22 October 1986 (aged 24)	15	1	(Venezuelan Football Federation) Real Esppor
3	DF	José Manuel Rey	20 May 1975 (aged 36)	111	11	(Venezuelan Football Federation) Mineros de Guayana
4	DF	Oswaldo Vizcarrondo	31 May 1984 (aged 27)	31	5	(Venezuelan Football Federation) Deportivo Anzoátegui
5	MF	Giácomo Di Giorgi	24 February 1981 (aged 30)	27	0	(Venezuelan Football Federation) Deportivo Anzoátegui
6	DF	Gabriel Cichero	25 April 1984 (aged 27)	25	1	(Argentine Football Association) Newell's Old Boys
7	FW	Miku	19 August 1985 (aged 25)	26	8	(Royal Spanish Football Federation) Getafe
8	MF	Tomás Rincón	13 January 1988 (aged 23)	34	0	(German Football Association) Hamburger SV
9	FW	Giancarlo Maldonado	29 June 1982 (aged 29)	55	20	(Mexican Football Federation) Atlante
10	MF	Yohandry Orozco	19 March 1991 (aged 20)	11	0	(German Football Association) VfL Wolfsburg
11	MF	César González	10 January 1982 (aged 29)	35	2	(Argentine Football Association) Gimnasia La Plata
12	GK	Leonardo Morales	7 July 1978 (aged 32)	23	0	(Venezuelan Football Federation) Deportivo Anzoátegui
13	MF	Luis Manuel Seijas	23 June 1986 (aged 25)	32	0	(Colombian Football Federation) Santa Fe
14	MF	Franklin Lucena	20 February 1981 (aged 30)	31	1	(Venezuelan Football Federation) Caracas
15	FW	Alejandro Moreno	9 July 1979 (aged 31)	31	3	(United States Soccer Federation) Chivas USA
16	DF	Roberto Rosales	20 November 1988 (aged 22)	24	0	(Royal Dutch Football Association) Twente
17	FW	Daniel Arismendi	4 July 1982 (aged 28)	30	11	(Venezuelan Football Federation) Deportivo Anzoátegui
18	MF	Juan Arango (captain)	16 May 1980 (aged 31)	94	18	(German Football Association) Borussia Mönchengladbach
19	MF	Jesús Meza	6 January 1986 (aged 25)	5	0	(Venezuelan Football Federation) Zamora
20	DF	Grenddy Perozo	25 May 1985 (aged 26)	18	1	(Colombian Football Federation) Boyacá Chicó
21	DF	Alexander González	13 September 1992 (aged 18)	3	0	(Venezuelan Football Federation) Caracas
22	GK	Dani Hernández	29 October 1985 (aged 25)	4	0	(Royal Spanish Football Federation) Real Murcia
23	FW	Salomón Rondón	16 September 1989 (aged 21)	11	4	(Royal Spanish Football Federation) Málaga

== Group C ==
=== Chile ===
Head coach: (Argentina) Claudio Borghi

No.	Pos.	Player	Date of birth (age)	Caps	Goals	Club
1	GK	Claudio Bravo (captain)	13 April 1983 (aged 28)	52	0	(Royal Spanish Football Federation) Real Sociedad
2	DF	Francisco Silva	11 February 1986 (aged 25)	3	0	(Football Federation of Chile) Universidad Católica
3	DF	Waldo Ponce	4 December 1982 (aged 28)	33	3	(Mexican Football Federation) Cruz Azul
4	MF	Mauricio Isla	12 June 1988 (aged 23)	21	1	(Italian Football Federation) Udinese
5	DF	Pablo Contreras	9 November 1978 (aged 32)	57	1	(Hellenic Football Federation) PAOK
6	MF	Carlos Carmona	21 February 1987 (aged 24)	27	0	(Italian Football Federation) Atalanta
7	FW	Alexis Sánchez	19 December 1988 (aged 22)	36	13	(Italian Football Federation) Udinese
8	DF	Arturo Vidal	22 May 1987 (aged 24)	31	2	(German Football Association) Bayer Leverkusen
9	FW	Humberto Suazo	10 May 1981 (aged 30)	46	19	(Mexican Football Federation) Monterrey
10	MF	Jorge Valdivia	19 October 1983 (aged 27)	45	4	(Brazilian Football Confederation) Palmeiras
11	MF	Luis Jiménez	17 June 1984 (aged 27)	22	2	(Italian Football Federation) Cesena
12	GK	Miguel Pinto	4 July 1983 (aged 27)	15	0	(Mexican Football Federation) Atlas
13	DF	Marco Estrada	28 May 1983 (aged 28)	28	1	(French Football Federation) Montpellier
14	MF	Matías Fernández	15 May 1986 (aged 25)	42	10	(Portuguese Football Federation) Sporting CP
15	FW	Jean Beausejour	1 June 1984 (aged 27)	35	3	(The Football Association) Birmingham City
16	FW	Gonzalo Fierro	21 March 1983 (aged 28)	21	1	(Brazilian Football Confederation) Flamengo
17	DF	Gary Medel	3 August 1987 (aged 23)	31	3	(Royal Spanish Football Federation) Sevilla
18	DF	Gonzalo Jara	29 August 1985 (aged 25)	43	3	(The Football Association) West Bromwich Albion
19	FW	Carlos Muñoz	21 April 1989 (aged 22)	2	0	(Football Federation of Chile) Santiago Wanderers
20	MF	Rodrigo Millar	3 November 1981 (aged 29)	28	2	(Football Federation of Chile) Colo-Colo
21	MF	Felipe Gutiérrez	8 October 1990 (aged 20)	4	0	(Football Federation of Chile) Universidad Católica
22	FW	Esteban Paredes	1 August 1980 (aged 30)	22	7	(Football Federation of Chile) Colo-Colo
23	GK	Paulo Garcés	2 August 1984 (aged 26)	1	0	(Football Federation of Chile) Universidad Católica

=== Mexico ===
Mexico participated in the 2011 Copa América as a U-22 squad.

Head coach: Luis Fernando Tena

No.	Pos.	Player	Date of birth (age)	Caps	Goals	Club
1	GK	Luis Ernesto Michel (captain)	21 July 1979 (aged 31)	7	0	(Mexican Football Federation) Guadalajara
2	DF	Kristian Álvarez	20 April 1992 (aged 19)	0	0	(Mexican Football Federation) Guadalajara
3	DF	Oswaldo Alanís	18 March 1989 (aged 22)	0	0	(Mexican Football Federation) Estudiantes Tecos
4	MF	Diego de Buen	13 July 1991 (aged 19)	0	0	(Mexican Football Federation) UNAM
5	DF	Dárvin Chávez	21 November 1989 (aged 21)	3	0	(Mexican Football Federation) Atlas
6	MF	Antonio Gallardo	19 April 1989 (aged 22)	0	0	(Mexican Football Federation) Guadalajara
7	FW	Ulises Dávila	23 June 1991 (aged 19)	0	0	(Mexican Football Federation) Guadalajara
8	DF	Carlos Orrantia	1 February 1991 (aged 20)	0	0	(Mexican Football Federation) UNAM
9	FW	Rafael Márquez Lugo	2 November 1981 (aged 29)	9	0	(Mexican Football Federation) Morelia
10	FW	Giovani dos Santos	11 May 1989 (aged 22)	45	11	(Royal Spanish Football Federation) Racing de Santander
11	MF	Javier Aquino	11 February 1990 (aged 21)	2	0	(Mexican Football Federation) Cruz Azul
12	GK	Liborio Sánchez	9 October 1989 (aged 21)	0	0	(Mexican Football Federation) Veracruz
13	GK	Carlos Felipe Rodríguez	3 April 1989 (aged 22)	0	0	(Mexican Football Federation) Morelia
14	DF	Néstor Araujo	29 August 1991 (aged 19)	2	1	(Mexican Football Federation) Cruz Azul
15	MF	Jorge Enríquez	8 January 1991 (aged 20)	2	0	(Mexican Football Federation) Guadalajara
16	DF	Miguel Ángel Ponce	12 April 1989 (aged 22)	0	0	(Mexican Football Federation) Guadalajara
17	MF	Édgar Pacheco	22 January 1990 (aged 21)	3	1	(Mexican Football Federation) Atlas
18	FW	Oribe Peralta	12 January 1984 (aged 27)	5	0	(Mexican Football Federation) Santos Laguna
19	DF	Héctor Reynoso	3 October 1980 (aged 30)	1	0	(Mexican Football Federation) Guadalajara
20	FW	Alan Pulido	8 March 1991 (aged 20)	0	0	(Mexican Football Federation) Tigres UANL
21	DF	Hiram Mier	25 August 1989 (aged 21)	1	0	(Mexican Football Federation) Monterrey
22	DF	Paul Aguilar	6 March 1986 (aged 25)	16	2	(Mexican Football Federation) Pachuca
23	DF	Diego Reyes	19 September 1992 (aged 18)	2	0	(Mexican Football Federation) América

=== Peru ===
Head coach: (Uruguay) Sergio Markarián

No.	Pos.	Player	Date of birth (age)	Caps	Goals	Club
1	GK	Raúl Fernández	6 October 1985 (aged 25)	8	0	(Peruvian Football Federation) Universitario de Deportes
2	DF	Alberto Rodríguez	31 March 1984 (aged 27)	32	0	(Portuguese Football Federation) Braga
3	DF	Santiago Acasiete	22 October 1977 (aged 33)	33	2	(Royal Spanish Football Federation) Almería
4	DF	Walter Vílchez	20 February 1982 (aged 29)	55	1	(Peruvian Football Federation) Sporting Cristal
5	MF	Adán Balbín	13 October 1986 (aged 24)	5	0	(Peruvian Football Federation) Universidad San Martín
6	FW	Juan Manuel Vargas (captain)	5 October 1983 (aged 27)	31	3	(Italian Football Federation) Fiorentina
7	MF	Josepmir Ballón	21 March 1988 (aged 23)	14	0	(Argentine Football Association) River Plate
8	MF	Michael Guevara	10 June 1984 (aged 27)	4	0	(Peruvian Football Federation) Sport Boys
9	FW	Paolo Guerrero	1 January 1984 (aged 27)	29	10	(German Football Association) Hamburger SV
10	MF	Rinaldo Cruzado	21 September 1984 (aged 26)	17	0	(Peruvian Football Federation) Juan Aurich
11	MF	Carlos Lobatón	6 February 1980 (aged 31)	9	0	(Peruvian Football Federation) Sporting Cristal
12	GK	Salomón Libman	25 February 1984 (aged 27)	4	0	(Peruvian Football Federation) Alianza Lima
13	DF	Renzo Revoredo	11 May 1986 (aged 25)	6	0	(Peruvian Football Federation) Universitario de Deportes
14	FW	Raúl Ruidíaz	25 July 1990 (aged 20)	3	0	(Peruvian Football Federation) Universitario de Deportes
15	DF	Aldo Corzo	20 May 1989 (aged 22)	4	0	(Peruvian Football Federation) Universidad San Martín
16	FW	Luis Advíncula	2 March 1990 (aged 21)	10	0	(Peruvian Football Federation) Sporting Cristal
17	DF	Giancarlo Carmona	8 October 1985 (aged 25)	2	0	(Argentine Football Association) San Lorenzo
18	FW	William Chiroque	10 March 1980 (aged 31)	8	0	(Peruvian Football Federation) Juan Aurich
19	DF	Yoshimar Yotún	7 April 1990 (aged 21)	3	0	(Peruvian Football Federation) Sporting Cristal
20	FW	André Carrillo	14 June 1991 (aged 20)	1	0	(Peruvian Football Federation) Alianza Lima
21	DF	Christian Ramos	4 November 1988 (aged 22)	10	0	(Peruvian Football Federation) Alianza Lima
22	MF	Antonio Gonzales	16 May 1986 (aged 25)	4	0	(Peruvian Football Federation) Universitario de Deportes
23	GK	Leao Butrón	6 March 1977 (aged 34)	36	0	(Peruvian Football Federation) Universidad San Martín

=== Uruguay ===
Head coach: Óscar Tabárez

No.	Pos.	Player	Date of birth (age)	Caps	Goals	Club
1	GK	Fernando Muslera	16 June 1986 (aged 25)	20	0	(Italian Football Federation) Lazio
2	DF	Diego Lugano (captain)	2 November 1980 (aged 30)	57	4	(Turkish Football Federation) Fenerbahçe
3	DF	Diego Godín	16 February 1986 (aged 25)	46	3	(Royal Spanish Football Federation) Atlético Madrid
4	DF	Sebastián Coates	7 October 1990 (aged 20)	1	0	(Uruguayan Football Association) Nacional
5	MF	Walter Gargano	27 July 1984 (aged 26)	38	1	(Italian Football Federation) Napoli
6	DF	Mauricio Victorino	11 October 1982 (aged 28)	17	0	(Brazilian Football Confederation) Cruzeiro
7	MF	Cristian Rodríguez	30 September 1985 (aged 25)	40	3	(Portuguese Football Federation) Porto
8	MF	Sebastián Eguren	8 January 1981 (aged 30)	37	6	(Royal Spanish Football Federation) Sporting Gijón
9	FW	Luis Suárez	24 January 1987 (aged 24)	42	17	(The Football Association) Liverpool
10	FW	Diego Forlán	19 May 1979 (aged 32)	76	29	(Royal Spanish Football Federation) Atlético Madrid
11	DF	Álvaro Pereira	28 November 1985 (aged 25)	28	3	(Portuguese Football Federation) Porto
12	GK	Juan Castillo	17 April 1978 (aged 33)	13	0	(Football Federation of Chile) Colo-Colo
13	FW	Sebastián Abreu	17 October 1976 (aged 34)	65	26	(Brazilian Football Confederation) Botafogo
14	MF	Nicolás Lodeiro	21 March 1989 (aged 22)	8	1	(Royal Dutch Football Association) Ajax
15	MF	Diego Pérez	18 May 1980 (aged 31)	64	0	(Italian Football Federation) Bologna
16	DF	Maxi Pereira	8 June 1984 (aged 27)	53	1	(Portuguese Football Federation) Benfica
17	MF	Egidio Arévalo	27 September 1982 (aged 28)	20	0	(Brazilian Football Confederation) Botafogo
18	FW	Abel Hernández	8 August 1990 (aged 20)	5	2	(Italian Football Federation) Palermo
19	DF	Andrés Scotti	14 December 1975 (aged 35)	33	1	(Football Federation of Chile) Colo-Colo
20	MF	Álvaro González	29 October 1984 (aged 26)	13	0	(Italian Football Federation) Lazio
21	FW	Edinson Cavani	14 February 1987 (aged 24)	28	9	(Italian Football Federation) Napoli
22	DF	Martín Cáceres	7 April 1987 (aged 24)	28	1	(Royal Spanish Football Federation) Sevilla
23	GK	Martín Silva	25 March 1983 (aged 28)	1	0	(Uruguayan Football Association) Defensor Sporting

== Player statistics ==
Player representation by club

Players	Clubs
7	(Mexico) Guadalajara, (Bolivia) Oriente Petrolero
6	(Italy) Inter Milan, (Ecuador) LDU Quito
5	(Spain) Atlético Madrid, (Spain) Barcelona, (Bolivia) Bolívar, (Italy) Udinese
4	(Costa Rica) Alajuelense, (Chile) Colo-Colo, (Venezuela) Deportivo Anzoátegui, (Ecuador) Deportivo Quito, (Italy) Milan, (Mexico) Monterrey, (Italy) Napoli, (Portugal) Porto, (Spain) Real Madrid, (Costa Rica) Saprissa, (Peru) Sporting Cristal, (Peru) Universitario de Deportes

Player representation by league

Country	Players
Mexico	35
Italy	30
Spain	30
Costa Rica	20
Bolivia	18
Peru	17
Ecuador	16
England	14
Argentina	12
Brazil	11
Venezuela	10
Portugal	9
Chile	8
Colombia	7
Germany	7
Paraguay	6
Turkey	4
Netherlands	3
Russia	3
Belgium	2
France	2
Ukraine	2
United States	2
Uruguay	2
Greece	1
Israel	1

Average age of squads

Average age	Countries
22	Costa Rica, Mexico
26	Argentina, Brazil, Chile, Peru
27	Colombia, Ecuador, Paraguay, Uruguay, Venezuela
28	Bolivia
