= Jerry León =

Ecuadorian footballer (born 1995)

Personal information
- Full name: Jerry Gabriel León Nazareno
- Date of birth: 22 April 1995 (age 31)
- Place of birth: Guayaquil, Ecuador
- Height: 1.74 m (5 ft 9 in)
- Position: Centre-back

Team information
- Current team: C.D. Olmedo

Youth career
- 2011–2012: Club Sport Norte América

Senior career*
| Years | Team | Apps | (Gls) |
| 2012–2017 | C.D. Cuenca | 20 | (1) |
| 2015 | → Deportivo Azogues (loan) | | (2) |
| 2017 | Gualaceo SC | | (1) |
| 2017–2018 | Universidad Católica | 6 | (0) |
| 2018 | Técnico Universitario | 7 | (1) |
| 2019 | Zulia F.C. | 21 | (0) |
| 2020 | Delfín S.C. | 1 | (0) |
- * Club domestic league appearances and goals as of 28 July 2019

Jerry Gabriel León Nazareno (born 22 April 1995) is an Ecuadorian footballer who plays as a defender for Olmedo in the Ecuadorian Serie A.
