= Arthur Gazze =

Brazilian footballer (born 2000)

Personal information
- Full name: Arthur Gazze de Souza
- Date of birth: 12 April 2000 (age 26)
- Place of birth: Santo André, Brazil
- Height: 1.90 m (6 ft 3 in)
- Position: Goalkeeper

Team information
- Current team: Jataiense

Youth career
- 2012–2021: São Paulo

Senior career*
| Years | Team | Apps | (Gls) |
| 2021 | São Paulo | 0 | (0) |
| 2021–2022 | Guarani | 1 | (0) |
| 2023 | Botafogo-PB | 0 | (0) |
| 2023 | Noroeste | 0 | (0) |
| 2024 | Audax-SP | 12 | (0) |
| 2024 | Audax-RJ | 9 | (0) |
| 2025– | Jataiense | 13 | (0) |

International career
| 2015 | Brazil U15 | | |
| 2017 | Brazil U17 | | |
- * Club domestic league appearances and goals as of 11 March 2025

Arthur Gazze (born 12 April 2000), is a Brazilian professional footballer who plays as a goalkeeper.

== Career ==
In the São Paulo youth categories since 2012, he was South American U15 champion in 2015 and U17 champion in 2017. In 2021 he was part of the squad registered in the 2021 Campeonato Paulista, even without playing in any game. In September 2021, Arthur was negotiated with Guarani, where he remained until the end of 2022, when he was announced by Botafogo da Paraíba.

In June 2023, he was announced by EC Noroeste as a reinforcement for the Copa Paulista dispute.

== Honours ==
São Paulo

- Copa São Paulo de Futebol Jr.: 2019
- Campeonato Paulista: 2021

Brazil U15

- South American U-15 Championship: 2015

Brazil U17

- South American U-17 Championship: 2017
