= Estadio La Granja =

Sports venue in Chile

Coordinates: 34°58′28″S 71°13′47″W

- La Granja
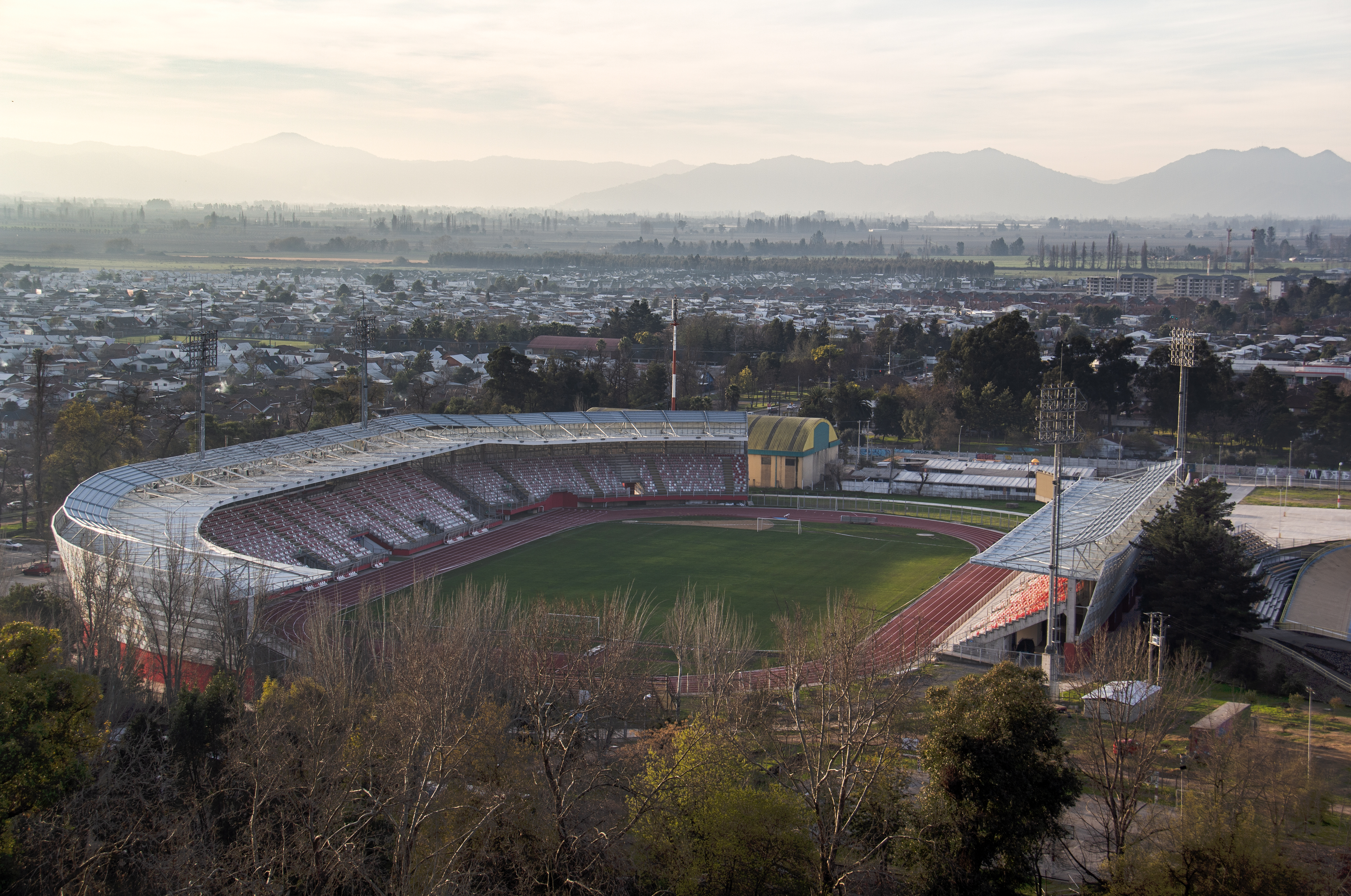
- Interactive map of Estadio La Granja
- Former names: Fiscal La Granja
- Location: Curicó, Chile
- Owner: Illustrious Municipality of Curicó
- Capacity: 8,278
- Surface: Grass

Construction
- Opened: 1949

Tenant
- Curicó Unido

The Estadio La Granja is a sports venue which is located in Curicó, Maule Region, Chile. The stadium holds 8,278 people and is part of a large sporting complex which also features tennis courts, swimming pools, a gymnasium, a velodrome and some other sport fields. It is the home stadium of Curicó Unido; and the former home ground of Alianza de Curicó, Luis Cruz, and Badminton de Curicó.

The stadium, currently owned by the Municipality of Curicó, originally has a capacity of 4,000. The first change; in 1985; was an increase of about 1,200, and another change was an increase to a capacity of 6,000, effected in 2004. An almost total reconstruction of the stadium was made in 2010, at that time only the west stands remains of the old stadium. Finally in 2017, the west stands were also renovated, marking the current capacity of 8,278 people.

The highest attendance for a match at La Granja to date is 8,981, for the Primera B match between Curicó Unido and Universidad de Chile (0-3), played on January 14, 1990.

In 2017, four Under-17 South American Championship group stage matches were played at the stadium.

== New stadium ==
In 2010, began the demolition and rebuilding the stadium, which was divided into two stages. This construction was done according to FIFA standards, including a VIP lounge, seats, transmission booths, LED scoreboards, among others.

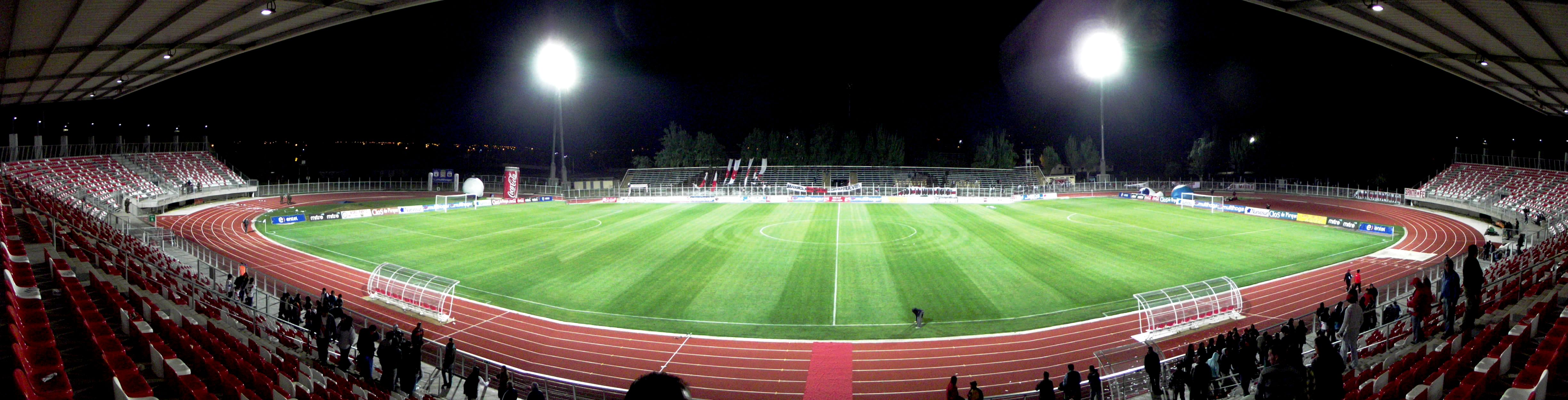
Panorama view of the stadium

== See also ==
- List of cycling tracks and velodromes
