= Anthony Aoki =

Peruvian footballer (born 2000)

Personal information
- Full name: Anthony Tadashi Aoki Nakama
- Date of birth: 8 June 2000 (age 26)
- Place of birth: Lima, Peru
- Height: 1.79 m (5 ft 10 in)
- Position: Midfielder

Team information
- Current team: Unión La Legua

Youth career
- Carper Club-Aelu
- Deportivo AELU
- 2015–2019: Sporting Cristal

Senior career*
Years	Team	Apps	(Gls)
2019–2021	Sporting Cristal	0	(0)
2019	→ Unión Huaral (loan)	7	(0)
2020	→ Ayacucho (loan)	6	(0)
2021	→ Ayacucho (loan)	8	(0)
2022–2025	Alianza Universidad	74	(0)
2025	Cusco	1	(0)
2026	Unión Comercio	1	(0)
2026–	Unión La Legua	0	(0)

International career
2014–2015	Peru U15		
2016–2017	Peru U17		
- * Club domestic league appearances and goals as of 13:12, 19 June 2026 (UTC)

Anthony Tadashi Aoki Nakama (born 8 June 2000) is a Peruvian footballer, who plays as a midfielder for Peruvian regional club *Dianderas Futbol Club* de Chincha.

== Career ==
=== Early and international career ===
Aoki started playing football at Carper Club-Aelu, where he already at the age of 4 played with boys up to 7 years old. At that time, he played as a forward but later began playing in the midfielder. Aoki then joined Deportivo AELU where he captained with great success in all the minor categories of the club, until he was summoned to train in some micro-cycles of the Peruvian U13 team (in 2012), coached by JJ Oré. Two years later, he was also included in the Peruvian U15 national team squad. In 2015, he received an offer from Sporting Cristal, which he accepted.

In February 2017, Aoki was called up for the Peruvian U17 national team to play in the 2017 South American U-17 Championship who would take place from February 23 to March 19. Aoki was also the team captain. He played four games for the team in the South American Championship.

In July 2017, Aoki went on a two-week trial at Japanese club Yokohama F. Marinos due to an invitation that arose out of the interest of Manchester City agents. Yokohama is owned by City Football Group, the holding company of Manchester City. Aoki was spotted by the City agents during the 2017 South American U-17 Championship with the U17 national team and told his representatives, that they would like him to belong to their company.

=== Club career ===
Already at the age of 17, Aoki was training with Sporting Cristal's first team and in 2017, he signed his first professional contract with Cristal. He played his first game for Cristal in January 2019 in a friendly game against Ecuadorian club C.S. Emelec. Unfortunately shortly after, Aoki suffered an injury that took him away from the courts, preventing him from playing for Cristal. To gain some experience and game fitness, he was loaned out to Peruvian Segunda División club Unión Huaral in August 2019 for the remainder of the year. He made seven appearances for the team before returning to Cristal in 2020.

At the end of February 2020, he was loaned out to Ayacucho FC. He made six appearances for the club. On 28 January 2021 it was reported, that Aoki would continue at Ayacucho FC on loan for another year.

In February 2022, Aoki moved to Peruvian Primera Division side Alianza Universidad on a permanent transfer.

== Personal life ==
Aoki is also holding a Japanese passport. His role model is former FC Barcelona legend Xavi.
