= Andrés Maldonado =

Venezuelan footballer (born 1994)

Personal information
- Full name: Andrés Eduardo Maldonado Manzini
- Date of birth: 9 April 1994 (age 32)
- Place of birth: Caracas, Venezuela
- Height: 1.89 m (6 ft 2 in)
- Position: Defender

Team information
- Current team: Atlético Venezuela
- Number: 26

Youth career
- Atlético Venezuela

Senior career*
Years	Team	Apps	(Gls)
2012–2017	Atlético Venezuela	53	(3)
2018–2020	Boston River	2	(0)
2018	→ Miramar Misiones (loan)	8	(0)
2019	→ Zulia (loan)	26	(0)
2021–	Atlético Venezuela	8	(0)
- * Club domestic league appearances and goals as of 25 September 2021

Andrés Eduardo Maldonado Manzini (born 9 April 1994) is a Venezuelan professional footballer who plays as a defender for Atlético Venezuela.

== Club career ==
Maldonado is an academy product of Atlético Venezuela and made his debut on 12 August 2012 in a 1–0 league defeat against Zulia. He scored his first goal on 26 July 2015 in a 3–1 win against Llaneros de Guanare.

== Career statistics ==
=== Club ===
As of 27 October 2019

Club	Season	League			Cup		Continental		Total	
Club	Season	Division	Apps	Goals	Apps	Goals	Apps	Goals	Apps	Goals
Atlético Venezuela	2012–13	Venezuelan Primera División	4	0	0	0	—		4	0
Atlético Venezuela	2013–14	Venezuelan Primera División	1	0	0	0	—		1	0
Atlético Venezuela	2014–15	Venezuelan Primera División	5	0	0	0	—		5	0
Atlético Venezuela	2015	Venezuelan Primera División	8	1	1	1	—		9	2
Atlético Venezuela	2016	Venezuelan Primera División	18	1	2	0	—		20	1
Atlético Venezuela	2017	Venezuelan Primera División	17	1	1	0	1 (Note: Appearances in Copa Sudamericana.)	0	19	1
Atlético Venezuela	Total		53	3	4	1	1	0	58	4
Boston River	2018	Uruguayan Primera División	2	0	—		0	0	2	0
Miramar Misiones (loan)	2018	Uruguayan Segunda División	8	0	—		—		8	0
Zulia (loan)	2019	Venezuelan Primera División	26	0	2	0	7	1	35	1
Career total			89	3	6	1	8	1	103	5
