= Joan Mazzaco =

Argentine professional footballer

Personal information
- Full name: Joan David Mazzaco
- Date of birth: 25 April 2000 (age 26)
- Place of birth: Díaz, Argentina
- Height: 1.70 m (5 ft 7 in)
- Position: Left-back

Youth career
- Sportivo Díaz
- Sportivo Díaz
- Rosario Central

Senior career*
Years	Team	Apps	(Gls)
2020–2023	Rosario Central	5	(0)
2021	→ Guayaquil City B (loan)		
2023	Guillermo Brown	2	(0)

International career
- Argentina U17
- * Club domestic league appearances and goals as of 00:09, 15 December 2020 (UTC)

Joan David Mazzaco (born 25 April 2000) is an Argentine professional footballer who plays as a left-back.

== Club career ==
Mazzaco began his career with Sportivo Diaz, where he had two spells separated by a stint with a club in Empalme Villa Constitución. In December 2019, after transferring to Rosario Central, Sportivo Diaz received compensation for developing Mazzaco as a left-back. Mazzaco himself questioned this compensation, claiming he had been poorly treated financially during his time at Sportivo Diaz. In 2020, while with Rosario Central, Mazzaco was an unused substitute seven times before making his debut in January against Huracán. On 14 December 2020, he made his debut in the Copa de la Liga Profesional in a match against Patronato.

== International career ==
In 2017, Mazzaco represented Argentina at the South American U-17 Championship in Chile. He played in matches against Peru and Brazil, but Argentina was eliminated at the first hurdle.

== Career statistics ==
As of 15 December 2020.

Appearances and goals by club, season and competition
Club	Season	League			Cup		League Cup		Continental		Other		Total	
Club	Season	Division	Apps	Goals	Apps	Goals	Apps	Goals	Apps	Goals	Apps	Goals	Apps	Goals
Rosario Central	2019–20	Primera División	0	0	0	0	0	0	—		0	0	0	0
Rosario Central	2020–21 (Note: Soccerway counts Copa de la Liga Profesional appearances as league appearances.)	Primera División	1	0	0	0	0	0	—		0	0	1	0
Career total			1	0	0	0	0	0	—		0	0	1	0
