= Benjamín Cam =

Chilean footballer (born 2000)

Personal information
- Full name: Benjamín Ignacio Cam Orellana
- Date of birth: 15 February 2000 (age 26)
- Place of birth: Providencia, Santiago, Chile
- Height: 1.78 m (5 ft 10 in)
- Position: Forward

Team information
- Current team: Ocean City Nor'easters
- Number: 21

Youth career
- Unión Española
- 2020-2021: Iowa Western CC
- 2021-2023: University of Rio Grande

Senior career*
Years	Team	Apps	(Gls)
2018–2019	Unión Española	1	(0)
2019–2020	Camden Cougars		
2022–	Ocean City Nor'easters		

International career^{‡}
2017	Chile U17	5	(0)
- * Club domestic league appearances and goals as of 14 September 2022 ‡ National team caps and goals as of June 28, 2018

Benjamín Ignacio Cam Orellana (born 15 February 2000) is a Chilean footballer who plays as a forward.

== Club career ==
A product of Unión Española youth system, Cam made his professional debut in 2018 thanks of the coach Martín Palermo. In May 2019 he moved to the United States to study and play for Camden County College. In 2021, he played for Iowa Western CC. Since 2022, he plays for Ocean City Nor'easters.

== International career ==
Cam represented Chile at under-17 level in the 2017 South American Championship.

== Personal life ==
His older brother, Nicolás, also plays football and moved to the United States in 2018, before Benjamín, to study and play for University of Rio Grande.
