= Andrés González (footballer, born 1990) =

Venezuelan footballer

Personal information
- Full name: Andrés Alfonso González
- Date of birth: 22 June 1990 (age 36)
- Place of birth: Petare, Caracas, Venezuela
- Height: 1.88 m (6 ft 2 in)
- Position: Goalkeeper

Team information
- Current team: Zulia F.C.
- Number: 1

Senior career*
Years	Team	Apps	(Gls)
2012–2015	Monagas S.C.	2	(0)
2015–2016	Deportivo Lara	0	(0)
2017–2018	Ureña F.C.		
2018–	Zulia F.C.	9	(0)
- * Club domestic league appearances and goals as of 26 July 2019

Andrés Alfonso González (born 22 June 1990) is a Venezuelan footballer who plays as a goalkeeper for Zulia F.C. in the Venezuelan Primera División.
