= Paulo Gallardo =

Peruvian footballer (born 2001)

Personal information
- Full name: Paulo Sergio Gallardo Olmos
- Date of birth: 29 January 2001 (age 25)
- Place of birth: Lima, Peru
- Height: 1.77 m (5 ft 10 in)
- Position: Forward

Youth career
- Sporting Cristal

Senior career*
Years	Team	Apps	(Gls)
2019–2021	Sporting Cristal	4	(1)
2020	→ Deportivo Municipal (loan)	5	(0)
2021	→ UTC (loan)	14	(1)
2022	UTC	0	(0)
2024	Unión Huaral	0	(0)

International career
2017	Peru U17	1	(0)
- * Club domestic league appearances and goals as of 21:48, 23 December 2021 (UTC)

Paulo Sergio Gallardo Olmos (born 29 January 2001) is a Peruvian footballer who plays as a forward.

== Club career ==
=== Sporting Cristal ===
Paulito is a product of Interlima Club, after that, he plays for Club Universidad San Martín in the Young team. Because of his good performance he goes to Sporting Cristal and got his professional debut for the club at the age of 19 on 6 April 2019 against Ayacucho FC. Gallardo started on the bench, before replacing Jesús Pretell after 80 minutes. In his fourth appearance for the club, against Deportivo Binacional

==== Career on stand-by ====
Out of sudden, 18-year old Paulito announced in August 2019, that he would put his athletic career on hold for two years due to religious reasons. In line with the announcement, Gallardo stated the following: Learning about the word of God has changed my life — I have great faith in Him. Now I will be a missionary so I can talk about the word of God with others. I’ll play soccer again, but everything is in the Lord’s hands. The missionaries continued teaching me, and a few months later I was baptized. Ever since I was a little boy, I dreamed of becoming a professional soccer player and maybe playing in Europe. You have no idea how much I will miss playing. But for now, I need to fulfill a mission for the Lord

It was also reported, that Gallardo had got his contract terminated by mutual agreement already on 5 August 2019, so he could “assume personal commitments for two years, regardless of official activities in the ‘King Sport’ during that period of time”. Gallardo also became a convert to the Church of Jesus Christ of Latter-day Saints.

==== Return to football ====
However, it was reported on 1 October 2019, that Gallardo had returned to training with Sporting Cristal's reserve team. His contract, which was under administrative leave, was reactivated from that day on and until the expiration date which was at the end of 2021.

In January 2020, Gallardo was loaned out to a fellow league club, Deportivo Municipal, to get his career back on track.

In July 2020 Gallardo revealed, that he regretted his decision to retire for a period: After a month I didn’t know what to do, I was suffering a lot and I kept thinking about what I did. Due to my mental health, I decided to return, but I was not the same, neither was my physical condition, so it was a very difficult year-end for me. Personally, I went through very hard situations and with my family I also had a hard time. They were very difficult moments in my life. I have my attitude and dedication for things that have happened to me throughout my childhood. My fights were totally different, they were struggles with myself, emotional issues, problems with my family. I suffered bullying as a child, with insults throughout my formative stage. Teasing, offensive nicknames, events that over time led me to be a person who now knows how to better control his emotions, and I focus my energy on being better on the field, ”he says with some nostalgia.

In January 2021, Gallardo was loaned out to UTC Cajamarca for the 2021 season. In December 2021 it was confirmed, that Gallardo had signed a permanent one-year deal with UTC.

In January 2024, Gallardo joined Peruvian Segunda División side Unión Huaral.
