= Nahuel Suárez =

Uruguayan footballer (born 2000)

Personal information
- Full name: Bruno Nahuel Suárez Pereyra
- Date of birth: 2 June 2000 (age 26)
- Place of birth: Montevideo, Uruguay
- Height: 1.83 m (6 ft 0 in)
- Position: Goalkeeper

Team information
- Current team: Progreso
- Number: 33

Youth career
- Defensor Sporting

Senior career*
Years	Team	Apps	(Gls)
2018–2019	Defensor Sporting	0	(0)
2018	→ Atenas (loan)	6	(0)
2019	→ Progreso (loan)	4	(0)
2020–2021	Progreso	16	(0)
2022	Villa Teresa		
2023–	Progreso	25	(0)

International career
2014–2015	Uruguay U15	12	(0)
2016–2017	Uruguay U17	11	(0)
2018	Uruguay U20	2	(0)
Medal record
Men's football
Representing Uruguay
South American Games
Silver medal – second place	2018 Cochabamba	Team
- * Club domestic league appearances and goals as of 1 January 2022

Bruno Nahuel Suárez Pereyra (born 2 June 2000) is a Uruguayan professional footballer who plays as a goalkeeper for Progreso.

== International career ==
Suárez is a former Uruguayan youth national team player.

== Career statistics ==
As of 1 January 2022

Appearances and goals by club, season and competition
Club	Season	League			Cup		Continental		Total	
Club	Season	Division	Apps	Goals	Apps	Goals	Apps	Goals	Apps	Goals
Atenas (loan)	2018	Uruguayan Primera División	6	0	—		—		6	0
Progreso (loan)	2019	Uruguayan Primera División	4	0	—		—		4	0
Progreso	2020	Uruguayan Primera División	11	0	—		—		11	0
Progreso	2021	Uruguayan Primera División	5	0	—		0	0	5	0
Progreso	Total		20	0	0	0	0	0	20	0
Career total			26	0	0	0	0	0	26	0

== Honours ==
Uruguay U20

- South American Games silver medal: 2018
