= Facundo Parada =

Uruguayan footballer (born 2000)

Personal information
- Full name: Facundo Parada Rocha
- Date of birth: 28 January 2000 (age 26)
- Place of birth: Montevideo, Uruguay
- Height: 1.90 m (6 ft 3 in)
- Position: Defender

Team information
- Current team: Cerro Largo
- Number: 2

Youth career
- –2020: Nacional

Senior career*
| Years | Team | Apps | (Gls) |
| 2019 | Nacional | 0 | (0) |
| 2019 | → Rentistas (loan) | 7 | (0) |
| 2020–2021 | Rentistas | 22 | (0) |
| 2022 | Rampla Juniors | 6 | (1) |
| 2022 | Central Español | 2 | (0) |
| 2023 | Uruguay Montevideo | 29 | (0) |
| 2024 | Albion | 19 | (0) |
| 2025– | Cerro Largo | 19 | (0) |

International career^{‡}
| 2017 | Uruguay U17 | 2 | (0) |
- * Club domestic league appearances and goals as of 1 October 2025 ‡ National team caps and goals as of 9 July 2020

Facundo Parada Rocha (born 28 January 2000) is a Uruguayan footballer who plays as a defender for Cerro Largo in the Uruguayan Primera División.

== Career ==
=== Rentistas (loan) ===
In April 2019, Parada moved to Uruguayan Segunda División club Rentistas on loan. He made his league debut for the club on 5 May 2019, coming on as a 58th minute substitute for Diego Rodríguez in a 1–0 victory over Central Español.
