= Sebastián Valencia =

Chilean footballer

Personal information
- Full name: Sebastián Andrés Valencia Cisternas
- Date of birth: 13 February 2000 (age 26)
- Place of birth: Santiago, Chile
- Height: 1.78 m (5 ft 10 in)
- Position: Defender

Team information
- Current team: Ñublense
- Number: 15

Youth career
- Colo-Colo

Senior career*
Years	Team	Apps	(Gls)
2019–2021	Colo-Colo	0	(0)
2019	→ San Antonio Unido (loan)	21	(0)
2020–2021	→ Deportes Colina (loan)	20	(1)
2021–2023	San Antonio Unido	62	(6)
2024–	Ñublense	11	(0)

International career
2017	Chile U17	12	(1)
- * Club domestic league appearances and goals as of 8 December 2025

Sebastián Andrés Valencia Cisternas (born 13 February 2000) is a Chilean footballer who plays as a defender for Ñublense in the Chilean Primera División.

== Club career ==
Born in Santiago, Chile, Valencia was trained at Colo-Colo. He was sent on loan to San Antonio Unido and Deportes Colina in 2019 and 2020, respectively.

In April 2021, Valencia returned to San Antonio Unido for three seasons until 2023.

In January 2024, Valencia signed with Ñublense in the Chilean top division.

== International career ==
Valencia represented Chile U17 at both the 2017 South American Championship and the 2017 FIFA World Cup.
