= Owen Falconis =

Uruguayan footballer (born 2000)

Personal information
- Full name: Owen Clark Falconis Lima
- Date of birth: 25 February 2000 (age 26)
- Place of birth: Montevideo, Uruguay
- Height: 1.70 m (5 ft 7 in)
- Position: Forward

Team information
- Current team: Juventud
- Number: 9

Youth career
- Defensor Sporting

Senior career*
Years	Team	Apps	(Gls)
2019–2022	Defensor Sporting	4	(1)
2020–2021	→ Salamanca (loan)	7	(0)
2021–2022	→ Cerrito (loan)	34	(1)
2023–	Juventud	50	(6)

International career
2015	Uruguay U15	17	(4)
2016–2017	Uruguay U17	19	(6)
- * Club domestic league appearances and goals as of 15 September 2024

Owen Clark Falconis Lima (born 25 February 2000) is an Uruguayan professional footballer who plays as a forward for Uruguayan Segunda División club Juventud.

== Career ==
Falconis made his professional debut on 25 May 2019 in a 2–4 loss against Fénix. He replaced Nicolás González in the 67th minute of the game and scored a goal.

Falconis is a former Uruguayan youth international. He was part of Uruguay squad at 2017 South American U-17 Championship.
