= Tomás Espinoza =

Chilean footballer (born 2001)

Personal information
- Full name: Tomás Luciano Espinoza Estay
- Date of birth: 27 May 2001 (age 25)
- Place of birth: Quilpué, Chile
- Position: Midfielder

Team information
- Current team: Colina
- Number: 13

Youth career
- 2011–2015: Santiago Wanderers
- 2015–2019: Rosario Central
- 2019–2020: Soledade

Senior career*
Years	Team	Apps	(Gls)
2022	Colchagua		
2023–	Colina		

International career
2017	Chile U17	2	(0)
- * Club domestic league appearances and goals as of 10 October 2022 (UTC)

Tomás Luciano Espinoza Estay (born 27 May 2001) is a Chilean footballer, currently playing as a midfielder for Colina.

== Club career ==
Born in Quilpué, Chile, Espinoza started his career with Santiago Wanderers, joining at the age of nine, before a move to Argentina with Rosario Central at the age of thirteen. Due to intervention by FIFA, he was unable to play for a year. In October 2018, he was named by English newspaper The Guardian as one of the best players born in 2001 worldwide.

Shortly before his eighteenth birthday, he left Rosario Central in controversial circumstances to pursue a career in Brazil, with the Argentinian club claiming he "went on vacation and never came back". According to Espionza, he received threats from fans for the move. While in Brazil, he trained with a subsidiary of Grêmio named Soledade, eventually signing a two-year deal.

He returned to Chile in 2020, training with former club Rosario Central. However, after he was unable to secure a contract, he went on to train with Deportes La Serena in late 2020.

In 2022, he signed with Chilean Third Division side Colchagua. However, after fans and players clashed during a match against Rancagua Sur, both clubs were suspended from all competitions for eighteen months. Following his release from Colchagua, he worked as a labourer for his uncle, transporting jerky.

He returned to football in March 2023, playing in Deportes Colina's 3–0 Copa Chile win over Municipal Puente Alto.

== International career ==
Espinoza has represented Chile at under-17 level.

== Career statistics ==
=== Club ===
As of 11 March 2023.

Appearances and goals by club, season and competition
Club	Season	League			Cup		Other		Total	
Club	Season	Division	Apps	Goals	Apps	Goals	Apps	Goals	Apps	Goals
Deportes Colina	2023	Tercera A	0	0	1 (Note: Appearances in the Copa Chile)	0	0	0	1	0
Career total			0	0	1	0	0	0	1	0
