= 2017 South American U-17 Championship =

Campeonato Sudamericano Sub-17 Chile 2017

Tournament details
- Host country: Chile
- City: Rancagua (Final stage)
- Dates: 23 February – 19 March
- Teams: 10 (from 1 confederation)
- Venue: 3 (in 3 host cities)

Final positions
- Champions: Brazil (12th title)
- Runners-up: Chile
- Third place: Paraguay
- Fourth place: Colombia

Tournament statistics
- Matches played: 35
- Goals scored: 90 (2.57 per match)
- Top scorer: (Brazil) Vinícius Júnior (7 goals)
- Best player: (Brazil) Vinícius Júnior

The 2017 South American Under-17 Football Championship (Spanish: Campeonato Sudamericano Sub-17 Chile 2017, Brazilian Portuguese: Campeonato Sul-Americano Sub-17 Chile 2017) was the 17th edition of the South American Under-17 Football Championship, a football competition for the under-17 national teams in South America organized by CONMEBOL. It was held in Chile from 23 February to 19 March 2017.

Brazil were crowned champions, and together with Chile, Paraguay and Colombia, which were the top four teams of this tournament, qualified for the 2017 FIFA U-17 World Cup in India.

== Teams ==
All ten CONMEBOL member national teams entered the tournament.

Team	Appearance	Previous best performance
Argentina	17th	Champions (3 times, most recent 2013)
Bolivia	17th	Champions (1 time, 1986)
Brazil (holders)	17th	Champions (11 times, most recent 2015)
Chile (hosts)	17th	Runners-up (1 time, 1993)
Colombia	17th	Champions (1 time, 1993)
Ecuador	16th	Third place (4 times, most recent 2015)
Paraguay	16th	Runners-up (1 time, 1999)
Peru	17th	Fourth place (1 time, 2007)
Uruguay	17th	Runners-up (3 times, most recent 2011)
Venezuela	17th	Runners-up (1 time, 2013)

== Venues ==
According to ANFP sources, Chile was named as host country of the tournament during the CONMEBOL Executive Committee meeting held on 12 May 2015, this was ratified by CONMEBOL at another meeting of its executive committee held on 4 April 2016. The chosen venues were Estadio El Teniente, Rancagua (Group A and final stage) and Estadio Fiscal, Talca (Group B). On 22 February 2017, Estadio La Granja, Curicó was added as an emergency venue to host the first two matchdays of Group B since Estadio Fiscal field was in poor condition.

Rancagua	Talca	Curicó
Estadio El Teniente	Estadio Fiscal	Estadio La Granja
34.177917°S 70.737507°W	35.419771°S 71.673905°W	34.974444°S 71.229722°W
Capacity:13,849	Capacity:8,200	Capacity:8,000

== Squads ==
Each team registered a squad of 23 players (three of whom had to be goalkeepers).

== Draw ==
The draw of the tournament was held on 12 January 2017, 14:00 CLST (UTC−3), at the Chilean Football Federation headquarters in Santiago, Chile. The ten teams were drawn into two groups of five. The hosts Chile and the defending champions Brazil were seeded into Group A and Group B respectively and assigned to position 1 in their group, while the remaining eight teams were placed into four "pairing pots" according to their final positions in the 2015 South American Under-17 Football Championship (shown in brackets).

Seeded	Pot 1	Pot 2	Pot 3	Pot 4
Chile (10) (Hosts, assigned to A1); Brazil (1) (Title holders, assigned to B1)	Argentina (2); Ecuador (3)	Paraguay (4); Uruguay (5)	Colombia (6); Venezuela (7)	Bolivia (8); Peru (9)

== Match officials ==
The referees and assistants referees were:

(Argentina) Jorge Baliño and Fernando Rapallini

Assistants: Lucas Germanotta and Gabriel Chade

(Bolivia) Juan Nelio García

Assistants: Jorge Baldivieso and Roger Orellana

(Brazil) Raphael Claus

Assistants: Bruno Pires and Danilo Manis

(Chile) Eduardo Gamboa

Assistants: Claudio Ríos and Edson Cisternas

(Colombia) Luis Sánchez

Assistants: Wilmar Navarro and Dionisio Ruiz

(Ecuador) Juan Albarracín

Assistants: Ricardo Barén and Edwin Bravo

(Paraguay) José Méndez

Assistants: Juan Zorrilla and Carlos Cáceres

(Peru) Michael Espinoza

Assistants: Michael Orué and Stephen Atoche

(Uruguay) Leodán González and Óscar Rojas

Assistants: Miguel Nievas and Gabriel Popovits

(Venezuela) Adrián Cabello

Assistants: Tulio Moreno and Elbis Gómez

- The Uruguayan referee Esteban Ostojich was replaced by Leodán González after Ostojich was ruled out of the championship after suffering an injury. González was assisted by Wilmar Navarro and Dionisio Ruiz (Colombia) in the first stage and by Nievas and Popovits (Uruguay) in the final stage.
- For the final stage, Fernando Rapallini (Argentina), Óscar Rojas and the assistants Miguel Nievas and Gabriel Popovits (Uruguay) were included.
- The Colombian referee Luis Sánchez, Ostojich and the uruguayan assistants Carlos Pastorino and Horacio Ferreiro did not referee any match in the tournament.

== First stage ==
The top three teams in each group advanced to the final stage.

Tiebreakers

When teams finished level of points, the final rankings were determined according to:

1. goal difference
2. goals scored
3. head-to-head result between tied teams (two teams only)
4. drawing of lots

All times local, CLST (UTC−3).

=== Group A ===
Pos	Team	Pld	W	D	L	GF	GA	GD	Pts	Qualification
1	Chile (H)	4	2	2	0	4	2	+2	8	Final stage
2	Colombia	4	2	1	1	8	6	+2	7	Final stage
3	Ecuador	4	2	0	2	3	3	0	6	Final stage
4	Uruguay	4	1	1	2	4	5	−1	4	
5	Bolivia	4	1	0	3	3	6	−3	3	

Source: CONMEBOL
(H) Hosts
23 February 2017
20:00

Ecuador	1–2	Colombia
Rezabala 25'	Report	Barrero 72'; Peñaloza 78'

Estadio El Teniente, Rancagua
Referee: Michael Espinoza (Peru)
23 February 2017
22:15

Chile	1–0	Bolivia
S. Valencia 38'	Report

Estadio El Teniente, Rancagua
Referee: José Méndez (Paraguay)

25 February 2017
20:00

Ecuador	1–0	Uruguay
Porozo 16'	Report

Estadio El Teniente, Rancagua
Referee: Raphael Claus (Brazil)
25 February 2017
22:15

Chile	1–1	Colombia
Alarcón 70'	Report	Peñaloza 60'

Estadio El Teniente, Rancagua
Referee: Jorge Baliño (Argentina)

27 February 2017
17:00

Uruguay	1–3	Colombia
Falconis 44'	Report	Peñaloza 38' (pen.); Barrero 49'; Campaz 63'

Estadio El Teniente, Rancagua
Referee: José Méndez (Paraguay)
27 February 2017
19:15

Ecuador	1–0	Bolivia
Campos 80'	Report

Estadio El Teniente, Rancagua
Referee: Adrián Cabello (Venezuela)

1 March 2017
17:00

Colombia	2–3	Bolivia
López 76'; Campaz 79'	Report	Roca 3', 56'; Melgar 7'

Estadio El Teniente, Rancagua
Referee: Raphael Claus (Brazil)
1 March 2017
19:15

Chile	1–1	Uruguay
A. Valencia 89'	Report	Neris 70'

Estadio El Teniente, Rancagua
Referee: Adrián Cabello (Venezuela)

3 March 2017
17:00

Uruguay	2–0	Bolivia
Chacón 45'; Viera 65'	Report

Estadio El Teniente, Rancagua
Referee: Michael Espinoza (Peru)
3 March 2017
19:15

Chile	1–0	Ecuador
Porozo 23' (o.g.)	Report

Estadio El Teniente, Rancagua
Referee: Jorge Baliño (Argentina)

=== Group B ===
Pos	Team	Pld	W	D	L	GF	GA	GD	Pts	Qualification
1	Brazil	4	3	1	0	7	1	+6	10	Final stage
2	Paraguay	4	2	2	0	6	3	+3	8	Final stage
3	Venezuela	4	2	1	1	6	5	+1	7	Final stage
4	Argentina	4	1	0	3	3	4	−1	3	
5	Peru	4	0	0	4	2	11	−9	0	

Source: CONMEBOL
24 February 2017
20:00

Argentina	0–1	Venezuela
	Report	Chalbaud 53'

Estadio La Granja, Curicó
Referee: Eduardo Gamboa (Chile)
24 February 2017
22:15

Brazil	3–0	Peru
Vinícius Jr. 13'; Marcos Antônio 33'; Lincoln 45+2' (pen.)	Report

Estadio La Granja, Curicó
Referee: Juan Albarracín (Ecuador)

26 February 2017
20:00

Argentina	0–1	Paraguay
	Report	Romero 19'

Estadio La Granja, Curicó
Referee: Juan Nelio García (Bolivia)
26 February 2017
22:15

Brazil	1–0	Venezuela
Paulinho 55'	Report

Estadio La Granja, Curicó
Referee: Leodán González (Uruguay)

28 February 2017
18:00

Paraguay	2–2	Venezuela
Galeano 22' (pen.); Morínigo 90+1'	Report	Fereira 47'; Hurtado 68'

Estadio Fiscal, Talca
Referee: Juan Albarracín (Ecuador)
28 February 2017
20:15

Argentina	3–0	Peru
Colidio 35', 39'; Obando 57'	Report

Estadio Fiscal, Talca
Referee: Leodán González (Uruguay)

2 March 2017
17:00

Venezuela	3–2	Peru
Barragán 21'; Hurtado 30'; Makoun 77'	Report	Mifflin 24'; Sánchez 45+3'

Estadio Fiscal, Talca
Referee: Juan Nelio García (Bolivia)
2 March 2017
19:15

Brazil	1–1	Paraguay
Vinícius Jr. 38'	Report	Sánchez 15' (pen.)

Estadio Fiscal, Talca
Referee: Eduardo Gamboa (Chile)

4 March 2017
17:00

Paraguay	2–0	Peru
Rodríguez 20'; Fuentes 43' (o.g.)	Report

Estadio Fiscal, Talca
Referee: Juan Albarracín (Ecuador)
4 March 2017
19:15

Brazil	2–0	Argentina
Brenner 61'; Yuri Alberto 82'	Report

Estadio Fiscal, Talca
Referee: Leodán González (Uruguay)

== Final stage ==
When teams finished level of points, the final rankings were determined according to the same criteria as the first stage, taking into account only matches in the final stage.

Pos	Team	Pld	W	D	L	GF	GA	GD	Pts	Qualification
1	Brazil	5	4	1	0	17	2	+15	13	2017 FIFA U-17 World Cup
2	Chile (H)	5	3	0	2	3	7	−4	9	2017 FIFA U-17 World Cup
3	Paraguay	5	2	2	1	10	7	+3	8	2017 FIFA U-17 World Cup
4	Colombia	5	2	1	2	4	6	−2	7	2017 FIFA U-17 World Cup
5	Venezuela	5	1	1	3	5	10	−5	4	
6	Ecuador	5	0	1	4	5	12	−7	1	

Source: CONMEBOL
(H) Hosts
7 March 2017
17:45

Colombia	2–1	Ecuador
Campaz 53'; Martínez 90+2'	Report	Quiñónez 12'

Estadio El Teniente, Rancagua
Referee: Juan Nelio García (Bolivia)
7 March 2017
20:00

Chile	1–0	Venezuela
Díaz 37'	Report

Estadio El Teniente, Rancagua
Referee: Juan Albarracín (Ecuador)
7 March 2017
22:15

Brazil	2–2	Paraguay
Lincoln 15', 40' (pen.)	Report	Sánchez 78'; Fernández 82'

Estadio El Teniente, Rancagua
Referee: Eduardo Gamboa (Chile)

10 March 2017
17:45

Paraguay	2–2	Ecuador
J. Rolón 44'; Fernández 56'	Report	Micolta 35'; Tobar 39'

Estadio El Teniente, Rancagua
Referee: Adrián Cabello (Venezuela)
10 March 2017
20:00

Chile	1–0	Colombia
Zúñiga 19'	Report

Estadio El Teniente, Rancagua
Referee: Raphael Claus (Brazil)
10 March 2017
22:15

Brazil	4–0	Venezuela
Luna 24' (o.g.); Lucas Halter 39'; Vinícius Jr. 83'; Yuri Alberto 90'	Report

Estadio El Teniente, Rancagua
Referee: José Méndez (Paraguay)

13 March 2017
17:45

Colombia	0–0	Venezuela
	Report

Estadio El Teniente, Rancagua
Referee: Jorge Baliño (Argentina)
13 March 2017
20:00

Chile	0–2	Paraguay
	Report	Romero 7'; Sánchez 45+1'

Estadio El Teniente, Rancagua
Referee: Óscar Rojas (Uruguay)
13 March 2017
22:15

Brazil	3–0	Ecuador
Vinícius Jr. 19', 29'; Lincoln 52'	Report

Estadio El Teniente, Rancagua
Referee: Michael Espinoza (Peru)

16 March 2017
17:45

Paraguay	3–1	Venezuela
Fernández 2'; Romero 20'; Rodríguez 54'	Report	Cásseres 90+1' (pen.)

Estadio El Teniente, Rancagua
Referee: Fernando Rapallini (Argentina)
16 March 2017
20:00

Chile	1–0	Ecuador
Zúñiga 34'	Report

Estadio El Teniente, Rancagua
Referee: Juan Nelio García (Bolivia)
16 March 2017
22:15

Brazil	3–0	Colombia
Vinícius Jr. 24', 52'; Alerrandro 69'	Report

Estadio El Teniente, Rancagua
Referee: Leodán González (Uruguay)

19 March 2017
17:45

Ecuador	2–4	Venezuela
Rezabala 37'; Micolta 46'	Report	Hurtado 21'; Echeverría 25' (pen.); Barragán 77'; Luna 90+2'

Estadio El Teniente, Rancagua
Referee: Óscar Rojas (Uruguay)
19 March 2017
20:00

Colombia	2–1	Paraguay
Barrero 40'; Vidal 66'	Report	Sánchez 9'

Estadio El Teniente, Rancagua
Referee: Michael Espinoza (Peru)
19 March 2017
22:15

Chile	0–5	Brazil
	Report	Paulinho 12'; Alan 44', 63', 83'; Lincoln 80'

Estadio El Teniente, Rancagua
Referee: Jorge Baliño (Argentina)

== Winners ==
2017 South American Under-17 Football champions

Brazil
12th title

== Goalscorers ==
7 goals

- (Brazil) Vinícius Júnior

5 goals

- (Brazil) Lincoln

4 goals

- (Paraguay) Martín Sánchez

3 goals

- (Brazil) Alan
- (Colombia) Santiago Barrero
- (Colombia) Jaminton Campaz
- (Colombia) Juan Peñaloza
- (Paraguay) Roberto Fernández
- (Paraguay) Fernando Romero
- (Venezuela) Jan Carlos Hurtado

2 goals

- (Argentina) Facundo Colidio
- (Bolivia) Ferddy Roca
- (Brazil) Paulinho
- (Brazil) Yuri Alberto
- (Chile) Gastón Zuñiga
- (Ecuador) Santiago Micolta
- (Ecuador) Jordan Rezabala
- (Paraguay) Alan Rodríguez
- (Venezuela) José Barragán

1 goal

- (Argentina) Agustín Obando
- (Bolivia) Sebastián Melgar
- (Brazil) Alerrandro
- (Brazil) Brenner
- (Brazil) Lucas Halter
- (Brazil) Marcos Antônio
- (Chile) Lucas Alarcón
- (Chile) Antonio Díaz
- (Chile) Alexis Valencia
- (Chile) Sebastián Valencia
- (Colombia) Luis Miguel López
- (Colombia) Juan David Martínez
- (Colombia) Juan David Vidal
- (Ecuador) Jhon Campos
- (Ecuador) Jackson Porozo
- (Ecuador) Mauricio Quiñónez
- (Ecuador) Cristian Tobar
- (Paraguay) Antonio Galeano
- (Paraguay) Nicolás Morínigo
- (Paraguay) Jesús Rolón
- (Peru) Leonardo Mifflin
- (Peru) Gonzalo Sánchez
- (Uruguay) Thomás Chacón
- (Uruguay) Owen Falconis
- (Uruguay) José Neris
- (Uruguay) Gustavo Daniel Viera
- (Venezuela) Cristian Cásseres
- (Venezuela) Sebastián Chalbaud
- (Venezuela) Jorge Echeverría
- (Venezuela) Eduardo Fereira
- (Venezuela) Diego Luna
- (Venezuela) Christian Makoun

Own goal

- (Ecuador) Jackson Porozo (playing against Chile)
- (Peru) Anthony Fuentes (playing against Paraguay)
- (Venezuela) Diego Luna (playing against Brazil)

Source: CONMEBOL

== Qualified teams for FIFA U-17 World Cup ==
The following four teams from CONMEBOL qualified for the 2017 FIFA U-17 World Cup.

Team	Qualified on	Previous appearances in tournament^{1}
Brazil	16 March 2017	15 (1985, 1987, 1989, 1991, 1995, **1997**, **1999**, 2001, **2003**, 2005, 2007, 2009, 2011, 2013, 2015)
Chile	16 March 2017	3 (1993, 1997, 2015)
Paraguay	16 March 2017	3 (1999, 2001, 2015)
Colombia	19 March 2017	5 (1989, 1993, 2003, 2007, 2009)

^{1} Bold indicates champion for that year. Italic indicates host for that year.
