= Marco Gómez (footballer, born 2000) =

Venezuelan footballer

Personal information
- Full name: Marco Andrés Gómez Muzzatti
- Date of birth: April 19, 2000 (age 26)
- Place of birth: Maracaibo, Venezuela
- Height: 1.77 m (5 ft 9 1/2 in)
- Position: Defender

Team information
- Current team: Zulia
- Number: 2

Senior career*
Years	Team	Apps	(Gls)
2016–	Zulia	48	(0)

International career^{‡}
2019–	Venezuela U20	1	(0)
- * Club domestic league appearances and goals as of 14:11, 20 October 2019 (UTC) ‡ National team caps and goals as of 14:11, 30 January 2019 (UTC)

Marco Andrés Gómez Muzzatti (born 19 April 2000) is a Venezuelan footballer who plays as a defender for Zulia.

== Career statistics ==
=== Club ===
As of 20 October 2019.

Club	Season	League			Cup		Continental		Other		Total	
Club	Season	Division	Apps	Goals	Apps	Goals	Apps	Goals	Apps	Goals	Apps	Goals
Zulia	2016	Venezuelan Primera División	0	0	1 (Note: Appearances in the Copa Venezuela)	0	–		0	0	1	0
Zulia	2017	Venezuelan Primera División	12	0	3	1	–		0	0	15	1
Zulia	2018	Venezuelan Primera División	24	0	7	0	0	0	0	0	31	0
Zulia	2019	Venezuelan Primera División	12	0	0	0	1 (Note: Appearances in the Copa Sudamericana)	0	0	0	13	0
Career total			48	0	11	1	1	0	0	0	60	1
