= Valentin Barbero =

Argentine footballer

Personal information
- Full name: Valentin Barbero
- Date of birth: 13 July 2000 (age 26)
- Place of birth: La Carlota, Argentina
- Height: 1.84 m (6 ft 1/2 in)
- Position: Midfielder

Team information
- Current team: San Luis (on loan from Belgrano)
- Number: 29

Youth career
- Belgrano

Senior career*
Years	Team	Apps	(Gls)
2017–	Belgrano	11	(0)
2021	→ Banfield (loan)	7	(0)
2022–	→ San Luis (loan)	14	(2)
- * Club domestic league appearances and goals as of 20:15, 20 June 2022 (UTC) ‡ National team caps and goals as of Estudiantes de Río IV Se encuentra a Préstamo por dos temporadas

Valentin Barbero (born 13 July 2000) is an Argentine professional footballer who plays as a midfielder for San Luis de Quillota, on loan from Belgrano.
