= Zulia F.C. =

Association football club in Venezuela

Zulia FC
- Full name: Zulia Fútbol Club
- Nicknames: Negriazules; Petroleros
- Founded: January 16, 2005; 21 years ago
- Dissolved: December 12, 2022; 3 years ago
- Ground: Estadio José Pachencho Romero; Maracaibo, Venezuela
- Capacity: 40,800
- Chairman: Luis Eduardo Farías
Home colours	Away colours

Zulia Fútbol Club was a professional football club that last competed in the Primera División Venezolana. The club was based in Maracaibo, Zulia State, Venezuela, and it's internationally recognized for its participation in the 2019 Copa Sudamericana, where the club was eliminated by Colón de Santa Fe, Argentinian club, in quarter-finals.

On 12 December 2022, it was announced that Zulia would merge into Segunda División side Deportivo Rayo Zuliano, with the latter taking the former's place in the Venezuelan Primera División. The merger was officially confirmed on 28 January 2023.

== Titles ==
- Venezuelan Primera División: 1
  - Runners-up: 1 (2016)
  - Torneo Clausura: 1 (2016)
- Copa Venezuela: 2
  - 2016, 2018
- Venezuelan Segunda División: 1
  - 2007–08
- Venezuelan Segunda División B: 1
  - 2006–07
- Venezuelan Tercera División: 1
  - 2005–06

== Current squad ==
As of 6 February 2018.

Note: Flags indicate national team as defined under FIFA eligibility rules; some limited exceptions apply. Players may hold more than one non-FIFA nationality.

No.	Pos.	Nation	Player
1	GK	VEN	Andrés González
2	MF	VEN	Marco Gómez
3	DF	VEN	Daniel Rivillo
4	DF	ECU	Jerry León
5	MF	VEN	Juan Manuel Castilla
6	DF	VEN	Gabriel Benítez
7	MF	VEN	Albert Zambrano
8	MF	ECU	Abel Casquete
9	FW	VEN	Junior Paredes
10	MF	VEN	Evelio Hernandez
13	MF	VEN	José Martínez
14	DF	VEN	Hector Bello
15	MF	VEN	Alan Sierra

No.	Pos.	Nation	Player
16	FW	VEN	Miguel Celis
17	MF	VEN	David Barreto
18	FW	VEN	Luis Paz
19	MF	VEN	Johao Martinez
20	DF	VEN	Andrés Maldonado
21	FW	VEN	José Rondon
22	MF	VEN	Camilo Pedrozo
23	GK	VEN	Leonardo Morales
24	DF	VEN	José Lara
25	MF	VEN	Gregory Rodriguez
26	DF	VEN	Jesus Paz
27	MF	VEN	Carlos Moreno
28	MF	VEN	Leonardo De La Hoz

== Top goalscorers ==
Player	Club career	Goals
(Colombia) Eder Hernández	2008–13	40
(Venezuela) Jefferson Savarino	2010–17	37
(Venezuela) Manuel Arteaga	2010–15	32
(Colombia) Freddys Arrieta	2008–10	26
(Venezuela) Gustavo Rojas	2008–13	21
(Venezuela) Yohandry Orozco	2009–11	11
