= Leonardo Morales (footballer, born 1978) =

Venezuelan footballer

José Leonardo Morales
Personal information
- Full name: José Leonardo Morales Lares
- Date of birth: July 7, 1978 (age 48)
- Place of birth: El Tigre, Venezuela
- Height: 1.84 m (6 ft 1/2 in)
- Position: Goalkeeper

Senior career*
Years	Team	Apps	(Gls)
1998–2000	Nueva Cádiz		
2000–2001	Zulianos		
2001–2002	Atlético Zulia		
2001–2002	Nacional Táchira		
2002–2003	Trujillanos		
2003–2007	Táchira		
2007–2013	Anzoátegui	87	(0)
2010–2011	Estudiantes de Mérida	14	(0)
2013–2017	Carabobo	140	(0)
2018–2021	Zulia	50	(0)

International career
2007–2014	Venezuela	26	(0)
- * Club domestic league appearances and goals as of 11 September 2011

José Leonardo Morales Lares (born 7 July 1978 in El Tigre) is a Venezuelan football goalkeeper who plays for Zulia and formerly the Venezuela national team.
