= Juan David Martínez =

Colombian footballer (born 2001)

Personal information
- Full name: Juan David Martínez Sánchez
- Date of birth: 3 May 2001 (age 25)
- Place of birth: Cali, Colombia
- Height: 1.70 m (5 ft 7 in)
- Position: Forward

Youth career
- Cortuluá

Senior career*
Years	Team	Apps	(Gls)
2017–2019	Cortuluá	2	(0)
2020–2022	Coritiba B	0	(0)
2022–2023	Fortaleza B	3	(0)
2023	Kukësi	3	(0)
2024	Lorca Deportiva	8	(0)

International career^{‡}
2017–2019	Colombia U17	18	(2)
- * Club domestic league appearances and goals as of 14 April 2024 ‡ National team caps and goals as of 28 April 2023

Juan David Martínez (born 3 May 2001) is a Colombian football player who plays as forward.
