= Andrés González (Spanish footballer) =

Spanish footballer

Personal information
- Full name: Andrés González Cardero
- Date of birth: 2 March 1988 (age 38)
- Place of birth: Burgos, Spain
- Height: 1.78 m (5 ft 10 in)
- Position: Right back

Team information
- Current team: La Calzada

Youth career
- Río Vena

Senior career*
Years	Team	Apps	(Gls)
2006–2007	Río Vena		
2007–2009	Burgos	65	(0)
2009–2010	Eibar	34	(0)
2010–2012	Salamanca	36	(2)
2012–2013	Racing B	35	(2)
2013–2020	Burgos	191	(2)
2020	Guijuelo	3	(0)
2021	Burgos Promesas	13	(0)
2022–2023	Arandina	21	(1)
2023–	La Calzada	35	(2)
- * Club domestic league appearances and goals as of 13 October 2024

Andrés González Cardero (born 2 March 1988), sometimes known as just Andrés, is a Spanish footballer who plays for La Calzada as a right back.

== Club career ==
Born in Burgos, Castile and León, González made his senior debuts with local UDG Río Vena in the 2006–07 season, in the regional leagues. He moved straight to Segunda División B in 2007, after agreeing to a contract with Burgos CF.

On 7 August 2009, González signed for SD Eibar also in the third level. The following 14 July, after being a regular starter, he moved to Segunda División side UD Salamanca.

A fourth-choice behind Sito, Anaitz Arbilla and Juanpa, Andrés only made his professional debut on 4 June 2011, starting in a 2–2 home draw against CD Numancia as his side suffered relegation. In the following campaign, he was an undisputed starter.

In August 2012, González moved to Racing de Santander B in the third division, suffering team relegation in his only season at the club. He subsequently returned to Burgos, being a first-choice in the following campaigns.
