= Martín Sánchez (footballer) =

Paraguayan footballer (born 2000)

Personal information
- Full name: Leonardo Martín Sánchez Cohener
- Date of birth: 27 January 2000 (age 26)
- Place of birth: Ybycuí, Paraguay
- Position: Forward

Team information
- Current team: Deportes Limache
- Number: 26

Youth career
- Olimpia

Senior career*
Years	Team	Apps	(Gls)
2017–2019	Olimpia	5	(0)
2019	→ Huachipato (loan)	0	(0)
2019	→ San Lorenzo (loan)	3	(0)
2020	Feirense	0	(0)
2021	Tapatío	–	(–)
2022	Barnechea	29	(5)
2023–	Deportes Limache	14	(7)

International career
2017	Paraguay U17	12	(5)
2017	Paraguay U18	1	(1)
- * Club domestic league appearances and goals as of 12 September 2023

Leonardo Martín Sánchez Cohener (born 27 May 2000), known as Martín Sánchez, is a Paraguayan footballer who currently plays as a forward for Chilean club Deportes Limache.

== Club career ==
For the 2023 season, he signed with Deportes Limache in the Segunda División Profesional de Chile, winning the league title.

== International career ==
Sánchez Cohener represented Paraguay at the 2017 FIFA U-17 World Cup, scoring in a 3-2 victory against the Mali.

== Career statistics ==
=== Club ===
As of 10 May 2018.

Club	Season	League			Cup		Continental		Other		Total	
Club	Season	Division	Apps	Goals	Apps	Goals	Apps	Goals	Apps	Goals	Apps	Goals
Club Olimpia	2017	Paraguayan Primera División	2	0	0	0	0	0	0	0	2	0
Club Olimpia	2018	Paraguayan Primera División	0	0	0	0	0	0	0	0	0	0
Career total			2	0	0	0	0	0	0	0	2	0

== Honours ==
Deportes Limache

- Segunda División Profesional de Chile: 2023
