= Carlos Eduardo Rodríguez (footballer) =

Venezuelan footballer (born 2000)

Carlos Rodríguez
Personal information
- Full name: Carlos Eduardo Rodríguez Gutiérrez
- Date of birth: 27 July 2000 (age 26)
- Place of birth: Maturín, Venezuela
- Height: 1.74 m (5 ft 9 in)
- Position: Midfielder

Team information
- Current team: Atlético Venezuela

Senior career*
Years	Team	Apps	(Gls)
2016–	Atlético Venezuela	10	(0)

International career^{‡}
2017–	Venezuela U17	8	(0)
- * Club domestic league appearances and goals as of February 24, 2018 ‡ National team caps and goals as of May 24, 2017

Carlos Eduardo Rodríguez Gutiérrez (born 27 July 2000) is a Venezuelan football player who plays as midfielder for Atlético Venezuela in Venezuelan Primera División.
