= Eduardo Fereira =

Venezuelan footballer (born 2000)

Eduardo Ferreira
Personal information
- Full name: Eduardo Enrique Ferreira Peñaranda
- Date of birth: 29 September 2000 (age 26)
- Place of birth: Valencia, Carabobo, Venezuela
- Height: 1.69 m (5 ft 7 in)
- Position: Right-back

Team information
- Current team: Caracas

Youth career
- Escuela Secasport
- Caracas

Senior career*
Years	Team	Apps	(Gls)
2017–2022	Caracas	143	(4)
2022–2023	Casa Pia	3	(0)
2023–2024	→ Academia Puerto Cabello (loan)	29	(0)
2025	Deportivo La Guaira	28	(1)
2026-	Caracas	2	(0)

International career
2017	Venezuela U17	9	(1)
2018	Venezuela U20	3	(0)
- * Club domestic league appearances and goals as of 6 May 2024

Eduardo Enrique Fereira Peñaranda (born 29 September 2000) is a Venezuelan professional footballer who plays as a right-back for Caracas.
