= Juan Peñaloza =

Colombian footballer (born 2000)

Personal information
- Full name: Juan Sebastián Peñaloza Ragga
- Date of birth: 3 May 2000 (age 26)
- Place of birth: Quibdó, Colombia
- Height: 1.70 m (5 ft 7 in)
- Position: Forward

Team information
- Current team: Ekranas

Youth career
- Estudiantil Medellín

Senior career*
Years	Team	Apps	(Gls)
2018–2019	Almudévar	8	(1)
2019	→ Teruel (loan)	11	(0)
2019–2020	Ejea	12	(0)
2020–2023	Huesca	0	(0)
2020–2021	→ Racing Ferrol (loan)	19	(0)
2021–2022	→ Águilas Doradas (loan)	24	(2)
2022–2023	→ Deportivo Pereira (loan)	8	(0)
2023	Valmiera	13	(1)
2024	Guangzhou FC	26	(2)
2025–2026	Llaneros	0	(0)
2026–	Ekranas	0	(0)

International career
2017	Colombia U17	13	(6)
- * Club domestic league appearances and goals as of 14 March 2026

Juan Sebastián Peñaloza Ragga (born 3 May 2000) is a Colombian footballer who plays as a forward for I Lyga club Ekranas.

== Club career ==
Born in Quibdó, Peñaloza was a CD Estudiantil de Medellín youth graduate, and moved to Spain on 19 September 2018, after signing a five-year contract with SD Huesca; he was initially assigned to the farm team AD Almudévar in Tercera División. The following 31 January, he moved on loan to Segunda División B side CD Teruel until June.

Peñaloza played for SD Ejea in the third division during the 2019–20 season, as the club became Huesca's new farm team. On 2 October 2020, he was loaned to fellow third-tier side Racing de Ferrol.

On 9 August 2021, Peñaloza returned to his home country after agreeing to a one-year loan deal with Águilas Doradas Rionegro. He made his professional debut the following day, coming on as a half-time substitute for Juan Camilo Salazar and scoring the match's winner in a 1–0 home success over Patriotas Boyacá.

On 28 February 2024, Peñaloza joined China League One club Guangzhou FC.
