= 2015 South American U-17 Championship squads =

The 2015 South American U-17 Championship was an international football tournament held in Paraguay from 4 to 29 March 2015. The ten national teams involved in the tournament were required to register a squad of 22 players; only players in these squads were eligible to take part in the tournament.

All ages are as of 4 March 2015, the first day of the tournament.

Player names marked in bold have been capped at full international level.

== Group A ==
=== Brazil ===
Manager: Caio Zanardi

No.	Pos.	Player	Date of birth (age)	Club
1	GK	Bruno	31 May 1998 (aged 16)	(Brazilian Football Confederation) Coritiba
2	DF	Kléber	2 August 1998 (aged 16)	(Brazilian Football Confederation) Flamengo
3	DF	Adryelson	23 March 1998 (aged 16)	(Brazilian Football Confederation) Sport Recife
4	DF	Zé Marcos	1 February 1998 (aged 17)	(Brazilian Football Confederation) Atlético Paranaense
5	MF	Riuler	25 January 1998 (aged 17)	(Brazilian Football Confederation) Atlético Paranaense
6	DF	Caíque	14 June 1998 (aged 16)	(Brazilian Football Confederation) São Paulo
7	MF	Andrey	15 February 1998 (aged 17)	(Brazilian Football Confederation) Vasco da Gama
8	MF	Matheus Pereira	25 February 1998 (aged 17)	(Brazilian Football Confederation) Corinthians
9	FW	Eronildo	16 July 1998 (aged 16)	(Brazilian Football Confederation) Vitória
10	FW	Leandrinho	11 October 1998 (aged 16)	(Brazilian Football Confederation) Ponte Preta
11	FW	Ramon	19 September 1998 (aged 16)	(Brazilian Football Confederation) Fluminense
12	GK	Juliano	14 March 1998 (aged 16)	(Brazilian Football Confederation) Atlético Paranaense
13	DF	Léo	9 December 1998 (aged 16)	(Brazilian Football Confederation) Corinthians
14	DF	Ronaldo	12 January 1998 (aged 17)	(Brazilian Football Confederation) Cruzeiro
15	MF	Renan	18 January 1998 (aged 17)	(Brazilian Football Confederation) Corinthians
16	DF	Matheus Mascarenhas	27 July 1998 (aged 16)	(Brazilian Football Confederation) Fluminense
17	MF	Lincoln	7 November 1998 (aged 16)	(Brazilian Football Confederation) Grêmio
18	MF	Jean Pyerre	7 May 1998 (aged 16)	(Brazilian Football Confederation) Grêmio
19	FW	Evander	9 June 1998 (aged 16)	(Brazilian Football Confederation) Vasco da Gama
20	MF	Mauro Júnior	6 May 1999 (aged 15)	(Brazilian Football Confederation) Desportivo Brasil
21	MF	Marco Túlio	13 March 1998 (aged 16)	(Brazilian Football Confederation) Atlético Mineiro
22	GK	Carlinhos	16 March 1998 (aged 16)	(Brazilian Football Confederation) São Paulo

=== Colombia ===
Manager: Juan Camilo Pérez

No.	Pos.	Player	Date of birth (age)	Club
1	GK	Luis García	20 March 1998 (aged 16)	(Royal Spanish Football Federation) Rayo Vallecano Juvenil B
2	MF	Cristian Tovar	6 May 1998 (aged 16)	(Colombian Football Federation) Deportes Tolima
3	MF	Jefferson Valdeblánquez	1 March 1998 (aged 17)	(Colombian Football Federation) Estudiantil
4	DF	Anderson Arroyo	27 September 1999 (aged 15)	(Colombian Football Federation) Boca Juniors
5	DF	**Stiven Vega**	22 May 1998 (aged 16)	(Colombian Football Federation) Millonarios
6	FW	Jesús Marimón	9 September 1998 (aged 16)	(Colombian Football Federation) Palmazul
7	MF	Jonathan Cuéllar	8 January 1998 (aged 17)	(Colombian Football Federation) Deportivo Cali
8	MF	David Josué Pérez	11 November 1998 (aged 16)	(Colombian Football Federation) Colombia Sport
9	FW	Edward Bolaños	14 August 1998 (aged 16)	(Colombian Football Federation) Estudiantil
10	MF	Wilmar Arango	13 January 1998 (aged 17)	(Colombian Football Federation) Estudiantil
11	MF	Edwin Ariza	17 January 1998 (aged 17)	(Colombian Football Federation) Alianza Petrolera
12	GK	Andrés Felipe Pérez	7 May 1999 (aged 15)	(Colombian Football Federation) Deportivo Cali
13	MF	Juan David Rengifo	27 January 1998 (aged 17)	(Colombian Football Federation) Deportivo Cali
14	MF	**Jhon Lucumí**	26 June 1998 (aged 16)	(Colombian Football Federation) Deportivo Cali
15	MF	**Jorge Carrascal**	25 May 1998 (aged 16)	(Colombian Football Federation) Millonarios
16	DF	Santiago Jiménez	1 March 1998 (aged 17)	(Colombian Football Federation) Envigado
17	MF	Jhan Carlos Riascos	17 May 1998 (aged 16)	(Colombian Football Federation) Deportivo Cali
18	MF	Edwin Cetré	1 January 1998 (aged 17)	(Colombian Football Federation) Boca Juniors
19	DF	**Carlos Cuesta**	9 March 1999 (aged 15)	(Colombian Football Federation) Atlético Nacional
20	FW	Juan José Calero	5 November 1998 (aged 16)	(Mexican Football Federation) Pachuca
21	DF	Brayhan Torres	23 January 1998 (aged 17)	(Colombian Football Federation) CEIF
22	GK	Juan Arturo	2 February 1998 (aged 17)	(Colombian Football Federation) Escuela Carlos Sarmiento Lora

=== Paraguay ===
Manager: Carlos Jara Saguier

No.	Pos.	Player	Date of birth (age)	Club
1	GK	Óscar Meza	15 March 1998 (aged 16)	(Paraguayan Football Association) Sportivo Luqueño
2	DF	Rodi Ferreira	29 May 1998 (aged 16)	(Paraguayan Football Association) Olimpia
3	DF	Juan Ojeda	4 April 1998 (aged 16)	(Paraguayan Football Association) Sportivo Luqueño
4	DF	**Blas Riveros**	3 February 1998 (aged 17)	(Paraguayan Football Association) Olimpia
5	DF	Elvis Echagüe	14 January 1998 (aged 17)	(Paraguayan Football Association) Sportivo Luqueño
6	MF	Arturo Aranda	20 April 1998 (aged 16)	(Paraguayan Football Association) Libertad
7	FW	Julio Villalba	11 September 1998 (aged 16)	(Paraguayan Football Association) Cerro Porteño
8	DF	**Jorge Morel**	22 January 1998 (aged 17)	(Paraguayan Football Association) Guaraní
9	FW	**Sebastián Ferreira**	13 February 1998 (aged 17)	(Paraguayan Football Association) Olimpia
10	MF	**Josué Colmán**	25 July 1998 (aged 16)	(Paraguayan Football Association) Cerro Porteño
11	DF	Óscar Rodas	8 February 1998 (aged 17)	(Paraguayan Football Association) Olimpia
12	GK	Gabriel Perrota	26 December 1998 (aged 16)	(Paraguayan Football Association) Nacional
13	DF	Luis Giménez	1 August 1998 (aged 16)	(Paraguayan Football Association) Olimpia
14	DF	Fernando Lomaquis	5 September 1998 (aged 16)	(Paraguayan Football Association) Rubio Ñu
15	MF	Bill López	13 January 1998 (aged 17)	(Paraguayan Football Association) Guaraní
16	MF	Gianlucca Fatecha	17 January 1998 (aged 17)	(Paraguayan Football Association) Olimpia
17	MF	**Cristian Paredes**	18 May 1998 (aged 16)	(Paraguayan Football Association) Sol de América
18	FW	Édgar Riveros	13 March 1998 (aged 16)	(Paraguayan Football Association) 3 de Febrero
19	FW	Jonathan Valiente	21 January 1998 (aged 17)	(Paraguayan Football Association) Libertad
20	MF	**Sergio Díaz**	5 March 1998 (aged 16)	(Paraguayan Football Association) Cerro Porteño
21	DF	Marcelo Arce	24 March 1998 (aged 16)	(Paraguayan Football Association) Olimpia
22	GK	Miguel Ángel Martínez	29 September 1998 (aged 16)	(Paraguayan Football Association) General Díaz

=== Peru ===
Manager: Juan José Oré

No.	Pos.	Player	Date of birth (age)	Club
1	GK	Pedro Ynamine	14 October 1998 (aged 16)	(Peruvian Football Federation) Universidad San Martín
2	DF	Marco Saravia	6 February 1999 (aged 16)	(Peruvian Football Federation) Academia Cantolao
3	DF	Óscar Pacheco	11 February 1998 (aged 17)	(Peruvian Football Federation) Universitario
4	DF	Martín Chang	4 January 1998 (aged 17)	(Peruvian Football Federation) Universidad San Martín
5	DF	Junior Huerto	26 April 1999 (aged 15)	(Peruvian Football Federation) Universidad San Martín
6	MF	Christian André Sánchez	5 April 1999 (aged 15)	(Peruvian Football Federation) Academia Cantolao
7	MF	**Gerald Távara**	25 March 1999 (aged 15)	(Peruvian Football Federation) Sporting Cristal
8	MF	José María Corrales	18 June 1998 (aged 16)	(Peruvian Football Federation) Universidad San Martín
9	FW	**Luis Iberico**	6 February 1998 (aged 17)	(Peruvian Football Federation) Universidad San Martín
10	FW	**Bryan Reyna**	23 August 1998 (aged 16)	(Peruvian Football Federation) Academia Cantolao
11	MF	Christopher Olivares	3 April 1999 (aged 15)	(Peruvian Football Federation) Esther Grande
12	GK	Víctor Egocheaga	2 February 1998 (aged 17)	(Peruvian Football Federation) Universitario
13	DF	Renzo Castro	12 April 1998 (aged 16)	(Peruvian Football Federation) Universidad San Martín
14	MF	Raúl Pajuelo	23 May 1998 (aged 16)	(Peruvian Football Federation) Universidad San Martín
15	MF	Jesús Mendieta	11 April 1998 (aged 16)	(Peruvian Football Federation) Sporting Cristal
16	MF	Anthony Quijano	3 March 1999 (aged 16)	(Peruvian Football Federation) Sporting Cristal
17	FW	Fernando José Pacheco	26 June 1999 (aged 15)	(Peruvian Football Federation) Sporting Cristal
18	FW	José Bolívar	17 January 2000 (aged 15)	(Peruvian Football Federation) Universidad San Martín
19	FW	Hideyoshi Arakaki	2 January 1998 (aged 17)	(Peruvian Football Federation) Universidad San Martín
20	MF	Kelvin Sánchez	3 January 1999 (aged 16)	(Peruvian Football Federation) Academia Cantolao
21	MF	Ricardo Bruno	1 June 1998 (aged 16)	(Peruvian Football Federation) Academia Cantolao
22	GK	Tarek Bendeck	27 November 1998 (aged 16)	(Peruvian Football Federation) Regatas Lima

=== Venezuela ===
Manager: Ceferino Bencomo

No.	Pos.	Player	Date of birth (age)	Club
1	GK	**Wuilker Faríñez**	15 February 1998 (aged 17)	(Venezuelan Football Federation) Caracas
2	DF	Sandro Notaroberto	10 March 1998 (aged 16)	(Venezuelan Football Federation) Deportivo La Guaira
3	DF	Christopher Camilli	20 April 1998 (aged 16)	(Venezuelan Football Federation) Zulia
4	DF	Jesús Farías	13 August 1998 (aged 16)	(Venezuelan Football Federation) Ciudad Vinotinto
5	DF	Antony Trujillo	14 November 1998 (aged 16)	(Venezuelan Football Federation) Zamora
6	DF	Joiser Arias	3 December 1998 (aged 16)	(Venezuelan Football Federation) Caracas
7	MF	**Edson Tortolero**	5 February 1998 (aged 17)	(Venezuelan Football Federation) Potros de Barinas
8	MF	**Yangel Herrera**	7 January 1998 (aged 17)	(Venezuelan Football Federation) Monagas
9	FW	Marco Farisato	30 January 1998 (aged 17)	(Royal Spanish Football Federation) Valencia Juvenil B
10	MF	Daniel Saggiomo	7 February 1998 (aged 17)	(Venezuelan Football Federation) Caracas
11	FW	Ronaldo Chacón	18 February 1998 (aged 17)	(Venezuelan Football Federation) Deportivo Táchira
12	GK	Jorge Roa	17 June 1998 (aged 16)	(Venezuelan Football Federation) Carabobo
13	FW	Víctor Arias	9 January 1998 (aged 17)	(Venezuelan Football Federation) Zamora
14	DF	Carlos Martínez	31 March 1998 (aged 16)	(Venezuelan Football Federation) Estudiantes de Caracas
15	FW	Gerardo Colmenares	10 March 1998 (aged 16)	(Venezuelan Football Federation) Deportivo Táchira
16	MF	Edgar Pérez	2 May 1998 (aged 16)	(Venezuelan Football Federation) Llaneros de Guanare
17	MF	Kevin de La Hoz	15 July 1998 (aged 16)	(Venezuelan Football Federation) Zamora
18	FW	Víctor Rivero	17 February 1998 (aged 17)	(Venezuelan Football Federation) Deportivo La Guaira
19	MF	Starling Yendis	7 March 1998 (aged 16)	(Venezuelan Football Federation) Puerto Cabello Te Quiero
20	DF	Winter Rivas	18 July 1998 (aged 16)	(Venezuelan Football Federation) Caracas
21	FW	Jholvis Acevedo	2 October 1998 (aged 16)	(Venezuelan Football Federation) Carabobo
22	GK	Carlos Hernández	17 January 1998 (aged 17)	(Venezuelan Football Federation) Catia

== Group B ==
=== Argentina ===
Manager: Miguel Lemme

No.	Pos.	Player	Date of birth (age)	Club
1	GK	Franco Petroli	11 June 1998 (aged 16)	(Argentine Football Association) River Plate
2	DF	Julián Ferreyra	22 April 1998 (aged 16)	(Argentine Football Association) Argentinos Juniors
3	DF	Luis Olivera	24 October 1998 (aged 16)	(Argentine Football Association) River Plate
4	DF	Matías Escudero	27 December 1998 (aged 16)	(Argentine Football Association) Racing
5	MF	Julián Chicco	13 January 1998 (aged 17)	(Argentine Football Association) Boca Juniors
6	DF	Facundo Pardo	12 August 1998 (aged 16)	(Argentine Football Association) Newell's Old Boys
7	MF	Gianluca Mancuso	3 February 1998 (aged 17)	(Argentine Football Association) Vélez Sarsfield
8	MF	**Exequiel Palacios**	5 October 1998 (aged 16)	(Argentine Football Association) River Plate
9	FW	Matias Roskopf	14 January 1998 (aged 17)	(Argentine Football Association) Boca Juniors
10	MF	Bautista Cejas	6 March 1998 (aged 16)	(Argentine Football Association) Estudiantes
11	FW	Lucas Ferraz Vila	18 February 1998 (aged 17)	(Argentine Football Association) River Plate
12	GK	Federico Bonansea	13 March 1998 (aged 16)	(Argentine Football Association) Belgrano
13	DF	**David Martínez**	21 January 1998 (aged 17)	(Argentine Football Association) River Plate
14	DF	Tiago Ruíz Díaz	24 July 1998 (aged 16)	(Argentine Football Association) Newell's Old Boys
15	DF	Juan Antonio Di Lorenzo	6 July 1998 (aged 16)	(Argentine Football Association) Independiente
16	MF	Lucas Coyette	28 March 1998 (aged 16)	(Argentine Football Association) Arsenal
17	FW	**Germán Berterame**	13 November 1998 (aged 16)	(Argentine Football Association) San Lorenzo
18	FW	Tomás Conechny	30 March 1998 (aged 16)	(Argentine Football Association) San Lorenzo
19	MF	Pablo Ruiz	20 December 1998 (aged 16)	(Argentine Football Association) San Lorenzo
20	FW	Abel Argañaraz	21 July 1998 (aged 16)	(Argentine Football Association) Lanús
21	FW	Valentín Fauro Aguirre	23 February 1998 (aged 17)	(Argentine Football Association) Instituto
22	GK	Matías Blengio	14 April 1998 (aged 16)	(Argentine Football Association) Tigre

=== Bolivia ===
Manager: (Argentina) Claudio Chacior

No.	Pos.	Player	Date of birth (age)	Club
1	GK	Carlos Garcia	3 February 1998 (aged 17)	(Bolivian Football Federation) Callejas
2	DF	Aldair Galarza	16 August 1998 (aged 16)	(Bolivian Football Federation) Callejas
3	MF	Miguel Paredes	1 June 1998 (aged 16)	(Bolivian Football Federation) Universitario de Pando
4	DF	**Harry Céspedes**	27 July 1998 (aged 16)	(Bolivian Football Federation) Bancruz Piraí
5	DF	Brandon Torrico	30 September 1998 (aged 16)	(Bolivian Football Federation) Quebracho
6	MF	Luis Iriondo	8 January 1999 (aged 16)	(Bolivian Football Federation) Callejas
7	MF	Alexander Gonzales	4 September 1998 (aged 16)	(Royal Spanish Football Federation) Athletic Bilbao Juvenil B
8	MF	**Moisés Villarroel**	27 August 1998 (aged 16)	(Bolivian Football Federation) Blooming
9	FW	Ronaldo Monteiro	11 January 1998 (aged 17)	(Bolivian Football Federation) Bolívar
10	MF	**Limberg Gutiérrez**	12 June 1998 (aged 16)	(Bolivian Football Federation) San Martín
11	FW	**Bruno Miranda**	10 February 1998 (aged 17)	(Bolivian Football Federation) Callejas
12	GK	**Rubén Cordano**	16 October 1998 (aged 16)	(Bolivian Football Federation) Blooming
13	MF	José Miguel Serrano	7 July 1998 (aged 16)	(Bolivian Football Federation) Florida
14	DF	Juan José Orellana	2 January 1998 (aged 17)	(Bolivian Football Federation) Bolívar
15	MF	**Henry Vaca**	27 January 1998 (aged 17)	(Bolivian Football Federation) Callejas
16	DF	Gabriel Medina	28 January 1999 (aged 16)	(Bolivian Football Federation) Florida
17	DF	Adrián Ulloa	28 January 1998 (aged 17)	(Bolivian Football Federation) Quebracho
18	MF	Diego Figueroa	13 March 1998 (aged 16)	(Argentine Football Association) Argentinos Juniors
19	FW	Danner Beltrán	4 February 1999 (aged 16)	(Bolivian Football Federation) Florida
20	MF	**Daniel Camacho**	15 October 1998 (aged 16)	(Bolivian Football Federation) Bolívar
21	MF	Marcelo Velasco	5 February 1998 (aged 17)	(Bolivian Football Federation) Blooming
22	GK	**Leonardo Vaca**	23 January 2000 (aged 15)	(Bolivian Football Federation) Florida

=== Chile ===
Manager: (Argentina) Alfredo Grelak

No.	Pos.	Player	Date of birth (age)	Club
1	GK	**Zacarías López**	30 June 1998 (aged 16)	(Football Federation of Chile) San Marcos
2	DF	Ricardo Álvarez	10 February 1999 (aged 16)	(Football Federation of Chile) Colo-Colo
3	DF	Alonso Rodríguez	8 June 1998 (aged 16)	(Football Federation of Chile) Universidad de Chile
4	DF	Lukas Soza	19 January 1998 (aged 17)	(Football Federation of Chile) Universidad Católica
5	DF	Diego González	29 April 1998 (aged 16)	(Football Federation of Chile) O'Higgins
6	MF	Marcelo Sandoval	30 July 1998 (aged 16)	(Football Federation of Chile) Universidad de Chile
7	MF	David Salazar	19 April 1999 (aged 15)	(Football Federation of Chile) O'Higgins
8	MF	Víctor Araya	15 June 1998 (aged 16)	(Football Federation of Chile) Colo-Colo
9	FW	Gabriel Mazuela	30 January 1999 (aged 16)	(Football Federation of Chile) Universidad de Chile
10	MF	René Meléndez	19 November 1998 (aged 16)	(Football Federation of Chile) Audax Italiano
11	FW	Simón Ramírez	3 November 1998 (aged 16)	(Football Federation of Chile) Huachipato
12	GK	Andrés Fernández	30 July 1998 (aged 16)	(Football Federation of Chile) Universidad Católica
13	MF	Maximiliano Riveros	5 July 1998 (aged 16)	(Football Federation of Chile) Barnechea
14	FW	Branco Provoste	14 April 2000 (aged 14)	(Football Federation of Chile) Colo-Colo
15	MF	Mathías Galdames	5 February 1998 (aged 17)	(Football Federation of Chile) Universidad de Chile
16	MF	Celín Valdés	16 January 1998 (aged 17)	(Football Federation of Chile) Colo-Colo
17	FW	Manuel Reyes	8 January 1998 (aged 17)	(Football Federation of Chile) Universidad Católica
18	FW	Antonio Ramírez	3 November 1998 (aged 16)	(Football Federation of Chile) Huachipato
19	DF	Juan José Soriano	12 January 1998 (aged 17)	(Football Federation of Chile) Universidad Católica
20	DF	Kevin Madariaga	18 April 1998 (aged 16)	(Football Federation of Chile) Audax Italiano
21	FW	**Iván Morales**	29 July 1999 (aged 15)	(Football Federation of Chile) Colo-Colo
22	GK	Luis Ureta	8 March 1999 (aged 15)	(Football Federation of Chile) O'Higgins

=== Ecuador ===
Manager: Javier Rodríguez

No.	Pos.	Player	Date of birth (age)	Club
1	GK	José Gabriel Cevallos	19 March 1998 (aged 16)	(Ecuadorian Football Federation) LDU Quito
2	DF	Joan Cortez	13 January 1998 (aged 17)	(Ecuadorian Football Federation) Norte América
3	DF	Joel Quintero	25 September 1998 (aged 16)	(Ecuadorian Football Federation) Emelec
4	DF	Francisco Obando	24 February 1998 (aged 17)	(Ecuadorian Football Federation) Independiente del Valle
5	MF	Juan Nazareno	18 August 1998 (aged 16)	(Ecuadorian Football Federation) Independiente del Valle
6	DF	Jhonner Montezuma	11 June 1998 (aged 16)	(Ecuadorian Football Federation) Norte América
7	FW	**Washington Corozo**	9 July 1998 (aged 16)	(Ecuadorian Football Federation) Emelec
8	MF	Andy Casquete	23 January 1998 (aged 17)	(Ecuadorian Football Federation) LDU Quito
9	FW	Arturo Batioja	5 August 1998 (aged 16)	(Ecuadorian Football Federation) Emelec
10	MF	Fabiano Tello	28 October 1998 (aged 16)	(Ecuadorian Football Federation) Independiente del Valle
11	FW	Jhon Pereira	3 September 1998 (aged 16)	(Ecuadorian Football Federation) Norte América
12	GK	Giancarlos Terreros	14 May 1998 (aged 16)	(Ecuadorian Football Federation) Barcelona
13	DF	**Byron Castillo**	10 November 1998 (aged 16)	(Ecuadorian Football Federation) Norte América
14	MF	Renny Jaramillo	12 June 1998 (aged 16)	(Ecuadorian Football Federation) América
15	FW	Jhoel Montaño	1 December 1998 (aged 16)	(Ecuadorian Football Federation) Deportivo Azogues
16	MF	Joao Montaño	22 April 1998 (aged 16)	(Ecuadorian Football Federation) América
17	DF	**Pervis Estupiñán**	21 January 1998 (aged 17)	(Ecuadorian Football Federation) LDU Quito
18	MF	Peter Valencia	27 January 1998 (aged 17)	(Ecuadorian Football Federation) River Plate
19	MF	Anderson Naula	22 June 1998 (aged 16)	(Ecuadorian Football Federation) LDU Loja
20	MF	Jean Carlos Peña	5 March 1998 (aged 16)	(Ecuadorian Football Federation) El Nacional
21	MF	**Alan Franco**	21 August 1998 (aged 16)	(Ecuadorian Football Federation) Independiente del Valle
22	GK	Leodán Chalá	25 January 1998 (aged 17)	(Ecuadorian Football Federation) El Nacional

=== Uruguay ===
Manager: Santiago Ostolaza

No.	Pos.	Player	Date of birth (age)	Club
1	GK	Renzo Rodríguez	1 January 1999 (aged 16)	(Uruguayan Football Association) Peñarol
2	DF	Nicolás Rodríguez	20 August 1998 (aged 16)	(Uruguayan Football Association) Nacional
3	DF	Joaquín Varela	27 June 1998 (aged 16)	(Uruguayan Football Association) Defensor Sporting
4	DF	Nicolás Fernández	2 March 1998 (aged 17)	(Uruguayan Football Association) Fénix
5	DF	**Santiago Bueno**	9 November 1998 (aged 16)	(Uruguayan Football Association) Peñarol
6	DF	**Marcelo Saracchi**	1 April 1998 (aged 16)	(Uruguayan Football Association) Danubio
7	MF	Wiston Fernández	4 January 1998 (aged 17)	(Uruguayan Football Association) Defensor Sporting
8	MF	**Federico Valverde**	22 July 1998 (aged 16)	(Uruguayan Football Association) Peñarol
9	FW	**Diego Rossi**	5 March 1998 (aged 16)	(Uruguayan Football Association) Peñarol
10	MF	Leonardo Fernández	8 November 1998 (aged 16)	(Uruguayan Football Association) Fénix
11	MF	Santiago Mederos	16 January 1998 (aged 17)	(Uruguayan Football Association) Danubio
12	GK	Francisco Tinaglini	9 November 1998 (aged 16)	(Uruguayan Football Association) River Plate
13	DF	Santiago Pérez	8 November 1998 (aged 16)	(Uruguayan Football Association) River Plate
14	DF	Andrés Romero	8 June 1998 (aged 16)	(Uruguayan Football Association) Nacional
15	DF	Maximiliano Silvera	25 January 1998 (aged 17)	(Uruguayan Football Association) Peñarol
16	MF	**Joaquín Piquerez**	24 August 1998 (aged 16)	(Uruguayan Football Association) Defensor Sporting
17	DF	Robert Ergas	15 January 1998 (aged 17)	(Uruguayan Football Association) Defensor Sporting
18	MF	Diego Vicente	19 July 1998 (aged 16)	(Uruguayan Football Association) River Plate
19	FW	Nicolás Schiappacasse	12 January 1999 (aged 16)	(Uruguayan Football Association) River Plate
20	FW	Martín Cháves	12 May 1998 (aged 16)	(Uruguayan Football Association) Peñarol
21	FW	Uri Amaral	19 May 1998 (aged 16)	(Uruguayan Football Association) Defensor Sporting
22	GK	**Cristopher Fiermarin**	1 January 1998 (aged 17)	(Uruguayan Football Association) Defensor Sporting
