= 2015 South American U-17 Championship =

2015 South American Under-17 Football Championship
Campeonato Sudamericano Sub-17 Paraguay 2015

Tournament details
- Host country: Paraguay
- Dates: 4–29 March
- Teams: 10 (from 1 confederation)
- Venues: 3 (in 3 host cities)

Final positions
- Champions: Brazil (11th title)
- Runners-up: Argentina
- Third place: Ecuador
- Fourth place: Paraguay

Tournament statistics
- Matches played: 35
- Goals scored: 116 (3.31 per match)
- Top scorer(s): (Brazil) Leandrinho (8 goals)
- Fair play award: Ecuador

The 2015 South American Under-17 Football Championship (Spanish: Campeonato Sudamericano Sub-17 Paraguay 2015, Brazilian Portuguese: Campeonato Sul-Americano Sub-17 Paraguay 2015) was the 16th edition of the biennial international youth football tournament organized by CONMEBOL for players aged 17 and below. It was held in Paraguay from 4 to 29 March 2015.

This tournament served as CONMEBOL's qualifier for the 2015 FIFA U-17 World Cup in Chile. The top four teams, tournament champions Brazil, Argentina, Ecuador, and hosts Paraguay, qualified for the 2015 FIFA U-17 World Cup, joining Chile who automatically qualified as hosts of the 2015 FIFA U-17 World Cup.

== Teams ==
All ten CONMEBOL member national teams entered the tournament.

Team	Appearance	Previous best performance
Argentina (holders)	16th	Champions (3 times, most recent 2013)
Bolivia	16th	Champions (1 time, 1986)
Brazil	16th	Champions (10 times, most recent 2011)
Chile	16th	Runners-up (1 time, 1993)
Colombia	16th	Champions (1 time, 1993)
Ecuador	15th	Third place (3 times, most recent 2005)
Paraguay (hosts)	15th	Runners-up (1 time, 1999)
Peru	16th	Fourth place (1 time, 2007)
Uruguay	16th	Runners-up (3 times, most recent 2011)
Venezuela	16th	Runners-up (1 time, 2013)

== Venues ==
Paraguay was named as host country of the tournament on 23 May 2012 at the CONMEBOL Executive Committee meeting held in Budapest, Hungary, prior to the 62nd FIFA Congress. A total of three venues were chosen to host the matches: Estadio Dr. Nicolás Léoz in Asunción, Estadio Deportivo Capiatá in Capiatá and Estadio Feliciano Cáceres, Luque.

Asunción	2015 South American U-17 Championship is located in Paraguay
Estadio Dr. Nicolás Léoz	2015 South American U-17 Championship is located in Paraguay
Capacity: 10,000	2015 South American U-17 Championship is located in Paraguay
Capiatá	2015 South American U-17 Championship is located in Paraguay
Estadio Deportivo Capiatá	2015 South American U-17 Championship is located in Paraguay
Capacity: 8,000	2015 South American U-17 Championship is located in Paraguay
Luque	2015 South American U-17 Championship is located in Paraguay
Estadio Feliciano Cáceres	2015 South American U-17 Championship is located in Paraguay
Capacity: 24,000	2015 South American U-17 Championship is located in Paraguay

== Match officials ==
On 10 February 2015, CONMEBOL announced the referees and assistants referees summoned for the tournament. The assistants Ariel Scime (Argentina), Cleriston Barreto (Brazil), Carlos Changala (Uruguay) and Tulio Moreno (Venezuela) were replaced by Cristian Navarro, Bruno Boschilia, Gabriel Popovits and Luis Murillo respectively.

(Argentina) Fernando Rapallini

Assistants: Iván Núñez and Cristian Navarro

(Bolivia) Gery Vargas

Assistants: Javier Bustillos and Juan Pablo Montaño

(Brazil) Wilton Sampaio

Assistants: Fabrício Vilarinho and Bruno Boschilia

(Chile) Roberto Tobar

Assistants: Christian Schiemann and Raúl Orellana

(Colombia) Luis Alfonso Sánchez

Assistants: Alexander Guzmán and Cristian de la Cruz

(Ecuador) Carlos Orbe

Assistants: Juan Carlos Macías and Edwin Bravo

(Paraguay) Mario Díaz de Vivar

Assistants: Eduardo Cardozo and Juan Zorrilla

(Peru) Miguel Santiváñez

Assistants: Víctor Ráez and Coty Carrera

(Uruguay) Jonhatan Fuentes

Assistants: Gabriel Popovits and Richard Trinidad

(Venezuela) Jesús Valenzuela

Assistants: Luis Murillo and Elbis Gómez

== Squads ==
Each team registered a squad of 22 players (three of whom had to be goalkeepers).

== Draw ==
The draw was held on 24 October 2014, 10:00 PYT (UTC−3), at the CONMEBOL Headquarters in Luque, Paraguay. The ten teams involved were settled in five "pairing pots" (Argentina–Brazil, Paraguay–Uruguay, Colombia–Ecuador, Chile–Peru, Bolivia–Venezuela) to be drawn into two groups of five. Initially Argentina and Brazil were announced as seeded teams, however, Paraguay (as hosts) and Uruguay were finally the teams seeded into Group A and Group B respectively and assigned to position 1 in their group. The remaining teams, including Argentina and Brazil, were drawn to determine their group as well as their position within it.

Seeded	Pot 1	Pot 2	Pot 3	Pot 4
Paraguay (Hosts, assigned to A1); Uruguay (assigned to B1)	Argentina; Brazil	Colombia; Ecuador	Chile; Peru	Bolivia; Venezuela

The draw results were as follows:

Group A
Pos	Team
A1	Paraguay
A2	Brazil
A3	Venezuela
A4	Colombia
A5	Peru

Group B
Pos	Team
B1	Uruguay
B2	Argentina
B3	Bolivia
B4	Ecuador
B5	Chile

== First stage ==
The top three teams in each group qualified for the final stage.

When teams finished level of points, the final order was determined according to:

1. superior goal difference in all matches
2. greater number of goals scored in all group matches
3. better result in matches between the tied teams
4. drawing of lots

All match times are in local Paraguay Time (UTC−3).

=== Group A ===
Pos	Team	Pld	W	D	L	GF	GA	GD	Pts	Group stage result
1	Paraguay (H)	4	2	2	0	8	5	+3	8	Advance to Final stage
2	Brazil	4	2	1	1	10	7	+3	7	Advance to Final stage
3	Colombia	4	1	2	1	8	7	+1	5	Advance to Final stage
4	Venezuela	4	1	2	1	8	8	0	5	
5	Peru	4	0	1	3	4	11	−7	1	

Source: CONMEBOL
(H) Hosts
4 March 2015
18:30

Paraguay	3–2	Venezuela
Díaz 24'; S. Ferreira 42', 51'	Report	Chacón 76'; Yendis 83'

Estadio Dr. Nicolás Léoz, Asunción
Referee: Roberto Tobar (Chile)
5 March 2015
20:10

Brazil	3–2	Colombia
Leandrinho 50'; Evander 65'; Andrey 73'	Report	Bolaños 45+1' (pen.); Ariza 74'

Estadio Feliciano Cáceres, Luque
Referee: Jonhatan Fuentes (Uruguay)

7 March 2015
18:00

Venezuela	2–2	Peru
Farisato 14'; Chacón 54'	Report	Iberico 59', 60'

Estadio Deportivo Capiatá, Capiatá
Referee: Gery Vargas (Bolivia)
7 March 2015
20:10

Paraguay	2–2	Brazil
Díaz 68'; Morel 80'	Report	Leandrinho 32'; Kléber 53'

Estadio Deportivo Capiatá, Capiatá
Referee: Fernando Rapallini (Argentina)

9 March 2015
18:00

Colombia	4–2	Peru
Bolaños 10'; Valdeblánquez 35'; D. Pérez 47' (pen.); Cuesta 50'	Report	Iberico 40' (pen.), 69'

Estadio Deportivo Capiatá, Capiatá
Referee: Roberto Tobar (Chile)
9 March 2015
20:10

Brazil	2–3	Venezuela
Lincoln 16'; Adryelson 23'	Report	Herrera 53' (pen.); Chacón 75'; Zé Marcos 82' (o.g.)

Estadio Deportivo Capiatá, Capiatá
Referee: Carlos Orbe (Ecuador)

11 March 2015
18:00

Venezuela	1–1	Colombia
Herrera 56'	Report	D. Pérez 6' (pen.)

Estadio Dr. Nicolás Léoz, Asunción
Referee: Fernando Rapallini (Argentina)
11 March 2015
20:10

Paraguay	2–0	Peru
R. Ferreira 20'; S. Ferreira 81'	Report

Estadio Dr. Nicolás Léoz, Asunción
Referee: Jonhatan Fuentes (Uruguay)

13 March 2015
18:00

Brazil	3–0	Peru
Leandrinho 59', 63', 82'	Report

Estadio Feliciano Cáceres, Luque
Referee: Gery Vargas (Bolivia)
13 March 2015
20:10

Paraguay	1–1	Colombia
Valiente 9'	Report	Ariza 58' (pen.)

Estadio Feliciano Cáceres, Luque
Referee: Carlos Orbe (Ecuador)

=== Group B ===
Pos	Team	Pld	W	D	L	GF	GA	GD	Pts	Group stage result
1	Uruguay	4	4	0	0	11	3	+8	12	Advance to Final stage
2	Ecuador	4	3	0	1	10	3	+7	9	Advance to Final stage
3	Argentina	4	2	0	2	7	5	+2	6	Advance to Final stage
4	Bolivia	4	1	0	3	5	14	−9	3	
5	Chile	4	0	0	4	4	12	−8	0	

Source: CONMEBOL
6 March 2015
18:00

Argentina	1–2	Ecuador
Berterame 89'	Report	Pereira 21'; Naula 88'

Estadio Dr. Nicolás Léoz, Asunción
Referee: Mario Díaz de Vivar (Paraguay)
6 March 2015
20:10

Uruguay	4–1	Bolivia
Ergas 38'; Valverde 48'; N. Rodríguez 71', 84'	Report	H. Vaca 56'

Estadio Dr. Nicolás Léoz, Asunción
Referee: Luis Sánchez (Colombia)

8 March 2015
18:00

Uruguay	2–1	Argentina
Valverde 4', 76' (pen.)	Report	Conechny 64'

Estadio Feliciano Cáceres, Luque
Referee: Wilton Sampaio (Brazil)
8 March 2015
20:10

Bolivia	3–2	Chile
Iriondo 25'; Miranda 48'; H. Vaca 63'	Report	Mazuela 15', 90'

Estadio Feliciano Cáceres, Luque
Referee: Jesús Valenzuela (Venezuela)

10 March 2015
18:00

Argentina	4–1	Bolivia
Conechny 31'; Ruiz 45+1', 90+2'; Coyette 63'	Report	Miranda 19'

Estadio Feliciano Cáceres, Luque
Referee: Miguel Santiváñez (Peru)
10 March 2015
20:10

Ecuador	4–1	Chile
Corozo 28'; Estupiñán 72'; Naula 88', 90+2'	Report	Salazar 33'

Estadio Feliciano Cáceres, Luque
Referee: Luis Sánchez (Colombia)

12 March 2015
18:00

Bolivia	0–4	Ecuador
	Report	Corozo 1'; Tello 10'; Jaramillo 25'; Casquete 33'

Estadio Deportivo Capiatá, Capiatá
Referee: Jesús Valenzuela (Venezuela)
12 March 2015
20:10

Uruguay	4–1	Chile
Rossi 1', 88'; Valverde 17'; Schiappacasse 90+3'	Report	Provoste 77' (pen.)

Estadio Deportivo Capiatá, Capiatá
Referee: Wilton Sampaio (Brazil)

14 March 2015
18:00

Argentina	1–0	Chile
Conechny 28'	Report

Estadio Deportivo Capiatá, Capiatá
Referee: Miguel Santiváñez (Peru)
14 March 2015
20:10

Uruguay	1–0	Ecuador
Saracchi 80'	Report

Estadio Deportivo Capiatá, Capiatá
Referee: Mario Díaz de Vivar (Paraguay)

== Final stage ==
When teams finished level of points, the final order was determined according to the same criteria as the first stage, taking into account only matches in the final stage.

All match times are in local Paraguay Time (UTC−3 for matchdays 1–2, and UTC−4 for matchdays 3–5).

Pos	Team	Pld	W	D	L	GF	GA	GD	Pts	Qualification
1	Brazil	5	3	0	2	8	7	+1	9	2015 FIFA U-17 World Cup
2	Argentina	5	2	2	1	7	4	+3	8	2015 FIFA U-17 World Cup
3	Ecuador	5	2	2	1	6	5	+1	8	2015 FIFA U-17 World Cup
4	Paraguay (H)	5	2	1	2	11	10	+1	7	2015 FIFA U-17 World Cup
5	Uruguay	5	2	0	3	6	7	−1	6	
6	Colombia	5	1	1	3	3	8	−5	4	

Source: CONMEBOL
(H) Hosts
17 March 2015
17:50

Brazil	0–1	Argentina
	Report	Berterame 34'

Estadio Feliciano Cáceres, Luque
Referee: Roberto Tobar (Chile)
17 March 2015
20:00

Paraguay	4–0	Colombia
R. Ferreira 37', 81'; Valdeblánquez 60' (o.g.); Valiente 72'	Report

Estadio Feliciano Cáceres, Luque
Referee: Wilton Sampaio (Brazil)
17 March 2015
22:10

Uruguay	0–1	Ecuador
	Report	Pereira 36'

Estadio Feliciano Cáceres, Luque
Referee: Fernando Rapallini (Argentina)

20 March 2015
17:50

Brazil	2–1	Ecuador
Leandrinho 5'; Lincoln 33'	Report	Tello 65'

Estadio Dr. Nicolás Léoz, Asunción
Referee: Gery Vargas (Bolivia)
20 March 2015
20:00

Paraguay	1–4	Argentina
S. Ferreira 78'	Report	Conechny 3', 90'; Berterame 32'; Chicco 80'

Estadio Dr. Nicolás Léoz, Asunción
Referee: Jonhatan Fuentes (Uruguay)
20 March 2015
22:10

Uruguay	1–0	Colombia
Rossi 68'	Report

Estadio Dr. Nicolás Léoz, Asunción
Referee: Miguel Santiváñez (Peru)

23 March 2015
16:50

Colombia	1–1	Argentina
Carrascal 24'	Report	Roskopf 49'

Estadio Deportivo Capiatá, Capiatá
Referee: Mario Díaz de Vivar (Paraguay)
23 March 2015
19:00

Paraguay	2–2	Ecuador
Rodas 51'; Díaz 62'	Report	Casquete 1', 9'

Estadio Deportivo Capiatá, Capiatá
Referee: Jesús Valenzuela (Venezuela)
23 March 2015
21:10

Uruguay	2–3	Brazil
Valverde 61', 75' (pen.)	Report	Evander 14', 82'; Ramón 68'

Estadio Deportivo Capiatá, Capiatá
Referee: Luis Sánchez (Colombia)

26 March 2015
16:50

Colombia	1–2	Ecuador
Cetré 52'	Report	Pereira 40'; Corozo 53'

Estadio Dr. Nicolás Léoz, Asunción
Referee: Fernando Rapallini (Argentina)
26 March 2015
19:00

Paraguay	2–3	Brazil
Aranda 7'; Caíque 67' (o.g.)	Report	Andrey 38'; Leandrinho 42', 77'

Estadio Dr. Nicolás Léoz, Asunción
Referee: Miguel Santiváñez (Peru)
26 March 2015
21:10

Uruguay	2–1	Argentina
Mederos 21'; R. Fernández 42'	Report	Palacios 74'

Estadio Dr. Nicolás Léoz, Asunción
Referee: Roberto Tobar (Chile)

29 March 2015
16:50

Ecuador	0–0	Argentina
	Report

Estadio Feliciano Cáceres, Luque
Referee: Gery Vargas (Bolivia)
29 March 2015
19:00

Paraguay	2–1	Uruguay
Paredes 31'; S. Ferreira 75'	Report	Valverde 53'

Estadio Feliciano Cáceres, Luque
Referee: Wilton Sampaio (Brazil)
29 March 2015
21:10

Brazil	0–1	Colombia
	Report	Cetré 58'

Estadio Feliciano Cáceres, Luque
Referee: Mario Díaz de Vivar (Paraguay)

== Winners ==
2015 South American Under-17 Football champions

Brazil
Eleventh title

== Goalscorers ==
There were 116 goals scored in 35 matches, for an average of 3.31 goals per match.

8 goals

- (Brazil) Leandrinho

7 goals

- (Uruguay) Federico Valverde

5 goals

- (Argentina) Tomás Conechny
- (Paraguay) Sebastián Ferreira

4 goals

- (Peru) Luis Iberico

3 goals

- (Argentina) Germán Berterame
- (Brazil) Evander
- (Ecuador) Andy Casquete
- (Ecuador) Washington Corozo
- (Ecuador) Anderson Naula
- (Ecuador) Jhon Pereira
- (Paraguay) Sergio Díaz
- (Paraguay) Rodi Ferreira
- (Uruguay) Diego Rossi
- (Venezuela) Ronaldo Chacón

2 goals

- (Argentina) Pablo Enrique Ruiz
- (Bolivia) Bruno Miranda
- (Bolivia) Henry Vaca
- (Brazil) Andrey
- (Brazil) Lincoln
- (Chile) Gabriel Mazuela
- (Colombia) Edwin Ariza
- (Colombia) Edward Bolaños
- (Colombia) Edwin Cetré
- (Colombia) David Josué Pérez
- (Ecuador) Fabiano Tello
- (Paraguay) Jonathan Valiente
- (Uruguay) Nicolás Rodríguez
- (Venezuela) Yangel Herrera

1 goal

- (Argentina) Julián Chicco
- (Argentina) Lucas Coyette
- (Argentina) Exequiel Palacios
- (Argentina) Matías Roskopf
- (Bolivia) Luis Iriondo
- (Brazil) Adryelson
- (Brazil) Kléber
- (Brazil) Ramón
- (Chile) Branco Provoste
- (Chile) David Salazar
- (Colombia) Jorge Carrascal
- (Colombia) Carlos Cuesta
- (Colombia) Jefferson Valdeblánquez
- (Ecuador) Pervis Estupiñán
- (Ecuador) Renny Jaramillo
- (Paraguay) Arturo Aranda
- (Paraguay) Jorge Morel
- (Paraguay) Cristhian Paredes
- (Paraguay) Óscar Rodas
- (Uruguay) Robert Ergas
- (Uruguay) Roberto Nicolás Fernández
- (Uruguay) Santiago Mederos
- (Uruguay) Marcelo Saracchi
- (Uruguay) Nicolás Schiappacasse
- (Venezuela) Marco Farisato
- (Venezuela) Starling Yendis

1 own goal

- (Brazil) Caíque (playing against Paraguay)
- (Brazil) Zé Marcos (playing against Venezuela)
- (Colombia) Jefferson Valdeblánquez (playing against Paraguay)

Source: CONMEBOL

== Qualified teams for FIFA U-17 World Cup ==
The following five teams from CONMEBOL qualify for the 2015 FIFA U-17 World Cup, besides Chile who qualified automatically as host.

Team	Qualified on	Previous appearances in FIFA U-17 World Cup^{1}
Chile	3 March 2011	2 (1993, 1997)
Brazil	26 March 2015	14 (1985, 1987, 1989, 1991, 1995, **1997**, **1999**, 2001, **2003**, 2005, 2007, 2009, 2011, 2013)
Argentina	26 March 2015	12 (1985, 1989, 1991, 1993, 1995, 1997, 2001, 2003, 2007, 2009, 2011, 2013)
Ecuador	26 March 2015	3 (1987, 1995, 2011)
Paraguay	29 March 2015	2 (1999, 2001)

^{1} Bold indicates champions for that year. Italic indicates hosts for that year.

== See also ==
- 2015 FIFA U-17 World Cup
