= Montserrat Carulla =

Spanish actress (1930–2020)

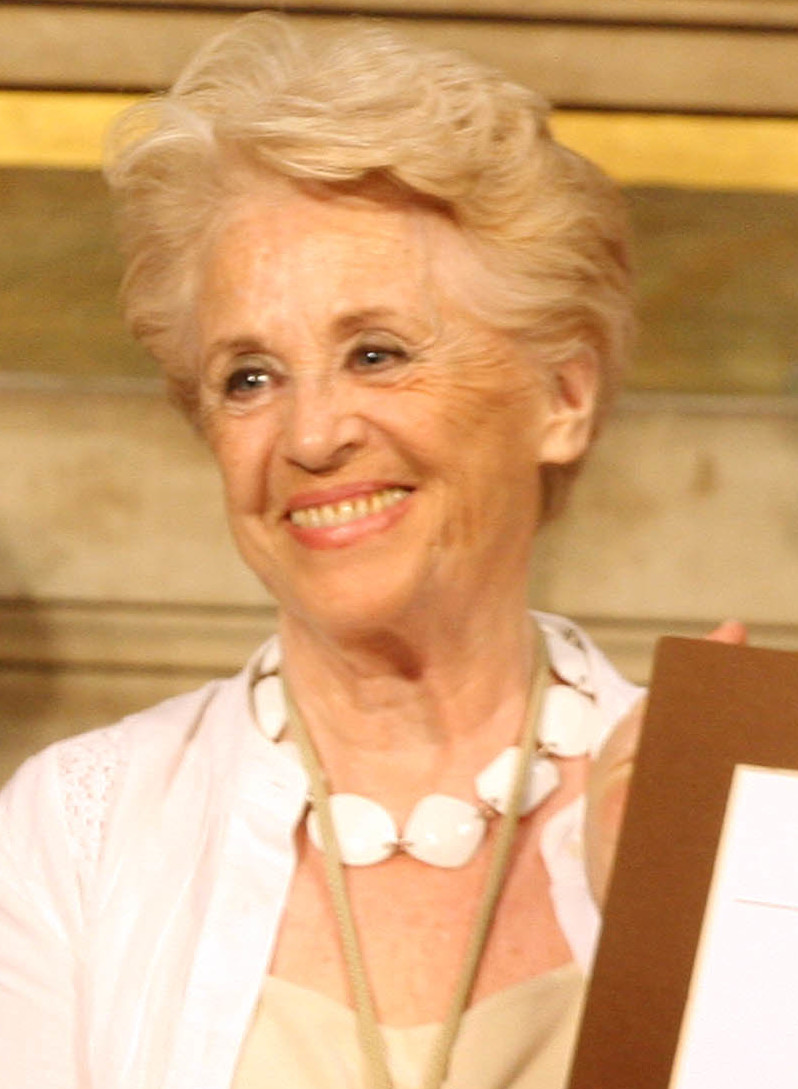
- Born: 19 September 1930; Barcelona, Catalonia, Spain
- Died: 24 November 2020 (aged 90); Barcelona

Montserrat Carulla i Ventura (Catalan pronunciation: [munsəˈrat kəˈɾuʎə]; 19 September 1930 – 24 November 2020) was a Spanish actress.

== Career ==
Coming from the amateur theatre, she completed her training with courses at the Institut del Teatre de Barcelona (Barcelona Theatre Institute) at the end of the 1940s. However, it was not until 1960 that she began to work in the professional theatre with Soparem a casa (We'll Dine at Home), by Josep Maria de Sagarra. After two seasons in Madrid, she returned to Barcelona in 1964.

== Theatre ==
- Soparem a casa (We'll Dine at Home), by Josep Maria de Sagarra
- El fiscal Recasens (Recasens, the District Attorney) by Josep Maria de Sagarra
- Romeo and Juliet adaptation by Josep Maria de Sagarra
- L'enterrament és a les quatre (The Burial is at Four), by Joan Vila Casas
- Mort de Dama (Death of a Lady), by Llorenç Villalonga
- La filla del mar (Daughter of the Sea), by Àngel Guimerà
- Pygmalion by Bernard Shaw
- La viuda trapella (The Widow Swindler), by Carlo Goldoni, in an adaptation by Maria Aurèlia Campmany
- Hamlet (1980), directed by Pere Planella.
- Primera història d'Esther (First Story of Esther) (1982) by Salvador Espriu
- El temps i els Conway (1992) by J. B. Priestley
- Guys and Dolls (1998), directed by Mario Gas
- The Beauty Queen of Leenane (1999) by Martin McDonagh
- A Little Night Music (2001) by Stephen Sondheim
- La plaça del Diamant (2004)
- Almenys no és Nadal (2004)

== Filmography ==
=== Film ===
- Surcos (1951) - Rosario
- Vida de familia (1963) - Rosa María
- Sunscorched (1965)
- Hic Digitur Dei (1976) - Mare d'Ell
- Cambio de sexo (1977, by Vicente Aranda) - Madre de José María
- Autopista A-2-7 (1977)
- Companys, procés a Catalunya (1979, by Josep Maria Forn) - Ramona Companys
- El vicari d'Olot (1981, by Ventura Pons) - Mare de Maria
- La rebelión de los pájaros (1982) - Madre
- Your Name Poisons My Dreams (1996) - Pilar Buendía
- Backroads (1997) - Abuela
- La ciutat dels prodigis (1999) - Micaela Castro
- Mala Uva (2004) - Matilde
- Working class (2005)
- Mariposa negra (2006) - Pilar
- El orfanato (2007) - Benigna
- Siempre hay tiempo (2009) - Clara
- Urteberri on, amona! (2011) - Amona Mari
- Orson west (2012) - Actriu teatre
- Barcelona, nit d'hivern (2015) - Carme
- Oh, quina joia! (2016) - Senyora Angelina

=== Television ===
- Oh! Europa (1994, by Dagoll Dagom) - Sra. Emília
- Secrets de família (1995) - Martina
- Oh! Espanya (1996, by Dagoll Dagom) - Sra. Emília
- Dones d'aigua (1997) - Anna Miralpeix
- Laberint d'ombres (1998-2000, by Josep Maria Benet i Jornet) - Cèlia
- El cor de la ciutat (2000-2008, by Josep Maria Benet i Jornet) - Teresa Torner
- Serrallonga (2008)
- Elles et Moi (2008) - Esperanza
