= Companys, procés a Catalunya =

1979 film

- Directed by: Josep Maria Forn
- Written by: Josep Maria Forn; Antoni Freixas
- Starring: Luis Iriondo
- Cinematography: Cecilio Paniagua
- Edited by: Emilio Rodríguez
- Release date: 17 September 1979
- Country: Spain
- Languages: Catalan; Spanish

Companys, procés a Catalunya (Spanish: Companys, proceso a Cataluña) is a 1979 Spanish Catalan drama film directed by Josep Maria Forn, based on the last months of the life of the President of Catalonia, Lluís Companys, in which he shows his detention by the Nazis and his subsequent execution by the Spanish Francoists. It competed in the Un Certain Regard section at the 1979 Cannes Film Festival.

== Cast ==
- Luis Iriondo - Lluís Companys
- Marta Angelat - Àngela
- Montserrat Carulla - Ramona Companys
- Xabier Elorriaga - Fortuny
- Pau Garsaball - Miquel
- Agustín González - Miembro del Tribunal
- Alfred Lucchetti - Juez instructor
- Marta May - Carme Ballester
- Biel Moll - Urraca Pastor
- Ovidi Montllor - Jordi
- Conrado Tortosa 'Pipper' - García
- Rafael Anglada - Martí
