= Bonansea =

Bonansea is an Italian surname. Notable people with the surname include:

- Alan Bonansea (born 1996), Argentine football player
- Barbara Bonansea (born 1991), Italian football player
- Federico Bonansea (born 1998), Argentine football player
- Miranda Bonansea (1926–2019), Italian actress
