= Santiago Mederos =

Santiago Mederos is the name of:

- Santiago Villalba Mederos (born 1991), American former fugitive
- Santiago Mederos (baseball) (1944–1979), Cuban baseball player
- Santiago Mederos (footballer) (born 1998), Uruguayan footballer
