= Sandro Notaroberto =

Venezuelan-Italian footballer (born 1998)

Personal information
- Full name: Sandro Notaroberto Peci
- Date of birth: 10 March 1998 (age 28)
- Place of birth: Caracas, Venezuela
- Height: 1.83 m (6 ft 0 in)
- Position: Centre back

Team information
- Current team: Academia Puerto Cabello

Youth career
- 2010–2015: Deportivo La Guaira

Senior career*
Years	Team	Apps	(Gls)
2015–2019	Deportivo La Guaira	16	(0)
2016–2017	→ Zulia (loan)	28	(0)
2019	Estudiantes de Caracas	11	(0)
2020–2023	Caracas	52	(0)
2023—	Academia Puerto Cabello	0	(0)

International career
2015	Venezuela U17	3	(0)
- * Club domestic league appearances and goals as of 17:45, 17 June 2021 (UTC)

Sandro Notaroberto Peci (born 10 March 1998) is a Venezuelan–Italian footballer who plays as a defender for Venezuelan Primera División side Academia Puerto Cabello.

== Club career ==
Notaroberto started his career at Deportivo La Guaira, making his debut in a 2015 Copa Venezuela game, before moving to Zulia for the 2016 season.

He played in his side's first game of the 2017 Copa Libertadores; a 2–1 loss to Chapecoense.

== International career ==
Notaroberto represented the Venezuelan under 17 side at the 2015 South American Under-17 Football Championship, where his side were knocked out in the first round.

He was called up to the under 20 side in 2015. He was called up to the 2017 South American Youth Football Championship, but failed to make an appearance.

== Career statistics ==
=== Club ===
As of 5 June 2017

Club performance			League		Cup		Continental		Total	
Club	Season	League	Apps	Goals	Apps	Goals	Apps	Goals	Apps	Goals
Venezuela			Primera División		Copa Venezuela		Continental		Total	
Deportivo La Guaira	2015	Primera División	5	0	1	0	0	0	6	0
Deportivo La Guaira	Total		5	0	1	0	0	0	6	0
Zulia	2016	Primera División	27	0	2	0	0	0	29	0
Zulia	2017	Primera División	1	0	0	0	1 (Note: Appearance in the Copa Libertadores)	0	2	0
Zulia	Total		28	0	2	0	1	0	31	0
Total	Venezuela		33	0	3	0	1	0	37	0
Total	Career total		33	0	3	0	1	0	37	0
