= Leandrinho (footballer, born 1998) =

Brazilian footballer

Personal information
- Full name: Leandro Henrique do Nascimento
- Date of birth: 11 October 1998 (age 28)
- Place of birth: Ribeirão Claro, Brazil
- Height: 1.74 m (5 ft 9 in)
- Position: Forward

Team information
- Current team: Capivariano

Youth career
- 2012–2013: Ituano
- 2014–2015: Ponte Preta

Senior career*
| Years | Team | Apps | (Gls) |
| 2015–2017 | Ponte Preta | 8 | (0) |
| 2017–2020 | Napoli | 0 | (0) |
| 2018–2019 | → Atlético Mineiro (loan) | 9 | (0) |
| 2020 | → Red Bull Bragantino (loan) | 0 | (0) |
| 2020–2025 | Red Bull Bragantino | 27 | (0) |
| 2022 | → Londrina (loan) | 8 | (0) |
| 2023 | → Maringá (loan) | 5 | (0) |
| 2025– | Capivariano | 0 | (0) |

International career
| 2014–2015 | Brazil U17 | 16 | (11) |
- * Club domestic league appearances and goals

Leandro Henrique do Nascimento (born 10 November 1998), commonly known as Leandrinho, is a Brazilian professional footballer who plays as a forward for Capivariano.

== Club career ==
=== Ponte Preta ===
Born in Ribeirão Claro, Leandrinho made his debut for Ponte Preta on the 8th matchday of the 2015 Campeonato Brasileiro Série A against Fluminense being substituted on for Renato Cajá. He scored his first goal for the club in the Copa do Brasil against Moto Club de São Luís on 7 May 2015, scoring in the 58th minute.

=== Napoli ===
On 12 January 2017, he joined Serie A club Napoli on a reported four-year/$600,000 deal. He did not make any appearances during his time, only being named on the bench.

=== Loan to Atlético Mineiro ===
On 10 July 2018, Leandrinho joined Atlético Mineiro on a year-long loan deal. He made his league debut against São Paulo on 6 September 2018.

=== RB Bragantino ===
On 28 February 2020, he joined Red Bull Bragantino on loan until 30 June 2020 with an option to purchase.

On 12 August 2020, Red Bull Bragantino activated the option to purchase. He made his league debut against Fortaleza Esporte Clube on 30 August 2020.

=== Loan to Londrina ===
On 17 August 2022, Leandrinho made his league debut against Esporte Clube Bahia on 17 August 2022.

=== Loan to Maringá ===
On 16 February 2023, Leandrinho made his league debut against Cianorte on 16 February 2023.

== International career ==
Leandrinho scored a hattrick against Peru U17s on 13 March 2015.

== Honours ==
Ponte Preta

- Campeonato Brasileiro Série B runner-up: 2014

Brazil U17

- South American U-17 Championship: 2015

Individual

- South American U-17 Championship top scorer: 2015
