= Cristopher Fiermarin =

Uruguayan footballer (born 1998)

Personal information
- Full name: Cristopher Javier Fiermarin Forlán
- Date of birth: 1 January 1998 (age 28)
- Place of birth: Rosario, Uruguay
- Height: 1.89 m (6 ft 2 in)
- Position: Goalkeeper

Team information
- Current team: Atlético Bucaramanga (on loan from Defensa y Justicia)
- Number: 25

Youth career
- Defensor Sporting

Senior career*
| Years | Team | Apps | (Gls) |
| 2018–2019 | Defensor Sporting | 0 | (0) |
| 2018 | → Montevideo City Torque (loan) | 21 | (0) |
| 2019–2024 | Montevideo City Torque | 78 | (0) |
| 2021–2022 | → Lommel (loan) | 18 | (0) |
| 2023–2024 | → Defensa y Justicia (loan) | 5 | (0) |
| 2024– | Defensa y Justicia | 21 | (0) |
| 2025 | → Deportes Tolima (loan) | 33 | (0) |
| 2026– | → Atlético Bucaramanga (loan) | 15 | (0) |

International career^{‡}
| 2014 | Uruguay U17 | 2 | (0) |
| 2020 | Uruguay U23 | 2 | (0) |
| 2025– | Uruguay | 4 | (0) |
- * Club domestic league appearances and goals as of 8 November 2026 ‡ National team caps and goals as of 14 November 2026

Cristopher Javier Fiermarin Forlán (born 1 January 1998) is a Uruguayan professional footballer who plays as a goalkeeper for Categoría Primera A club Atlético Bucaramanga, on loan from Argentine club Defensa y Justicia, and the Uruguay national team.

== Club career ==
A youth academy graduate of Defensor Sporting, Fiermarin joined newly promoted side Montevideo City Torque on loan for 2018 season. He made his professional debut on 1 April 2018, by replacing Jonathan Cubero in a 2–0 league win against Peñarol.

On 22 July 2021, Belgian club Lommel announced the signing of Fiermarin on a season long loan deal. In July 2023, he joined Argentine club Defensa y Justicia on loan for an year. In June 2024, he signed a four-year contract with Defensa y Justicia after the club bought 60% of his economic rights.

In January 2025, Fiermarin joined Colombian club Deportes Tolima on a season long loan deal.

== International career ==
As a youth international, Fiermarin has represented Uruguay at under-17 and under-23 levels. He was part of Uruguay at the 2015 South American U-17 Championship. In December 2019, he was named in 23-man final squad for the 2020 CONMEBOL Pre-Olympic Tournament.

In June 2025, Fiermarin received his first call-up to the Uruguay national team. He made his debut on 10 October 2025 in a 1–0 friendly win against the Dominican Republic.

== Personal life ==
Fiermarin is a distant relative of Diego Forlán.

== Career statistics ==
=== Club ===
As of 17 October 2022

Appearances and goals by club, season and competition
| Club | Season | League | | | Cup | | Continental | | Other | | Total | |
| Club | Season | Division | Apps | Goals | Apps | Goals | Apps | Goals | Apps | Goals | Apps | Goals |
|---|---|---|---|---|---|---|---|---|---|---|---|---|
| Montevideo City Torque (loan) | 2018 | Uruguayan Primera División | 21 | 0 | — | | — | | 1 (Note: Appearance in Torneo Intermedio final.) | 0 | 22 | 0 |
| Montevideo City Torque | 2019 | Uruguayan Segunda División | 22 | 0 | — | | — | | — | | 22 | 0 |
| Montevideo City Torque | 2020 | Uruguayan Primera División | 36 | 0 | — | | — | | — | | 36 | 0 |
| Montevideo City Torque | 2021 | Uruguayan Primera División | 6 | 0 | — | | 6 (Note: Appearances in Copa Sudamericana.) | 0 | — | | 12 | 0 |
| Montevideo City Torque | 2022 | Uruguayan Primera División | 14 | 0 | 0 | 0 | 0 | 0 | — | | 14 | 0 |
| Montevideo City Torque | Total | | 99 | 0 | 0 | 0 | 6 | 0 | 1 | 0 | 106 | 0 |
| Lommel (loan) | 2021–22 | Belgian First Division B | 18 | 0 | 2 | 0 | — | | — | | 20 | 0 |
| Career total | | | 117 | 0 | 2 | 0 | 6 | 0 | 1 | 0 | 126 | 0 |

=== International ===
As of match played 13 November 2026

Appearances and goals by national team and year
| National team | Year | Apps | Goals |
|---|---|---|---|
| Uruguay | 2025 | 2 | 0 |
| Uruguay | 2026 | 2 | 0 |
| Total | | 4 | 0 |

== Honours ==
Montevideo City Torque

- Uruguayan Segunda División: 2019
