= Lukas Soza =

Chilean footballer

Personal information
- Full name: Lukas Gustavo Soza Rodríguez
- Date of birth: 19 January 1998 (age 28)
- Place of birth: Linares, Chile
- Height: 1.81 m (5 ft 11 in)
- Position: Full-back

Team information
- Current team: Coquimbo Unido
- Number: 26

Youth career
- Balmaceda FC
- Universidad Católica

Senior career*
Years	Team	Apps	(Gls)
2018	Universidad Católica	0	(0)
2018	→ Deportes Copiapó (loan)	23	(1)
2019	Deportes Copiapó	27	(0)
2020–2024	Deportes Antofagasta	75	(1)
2022	→ San Luis (loan)	28	(0)
2025–	Coquimbo Unido	0	(0)

International career
2014–2015	Chile U17	3	(0)
- * Club domestic league appearances and goals as of 16 December 2024

Lukas Gustavo Soza Rodríguez (born 19 January 1998) is a Chilean footballer who plays as a right-back for Coquimbo Unido. Mainly a right-back, he can also operate on the left side.

== Club career ==
As a youth player, Soza was with Balmaceda Fútbol Club from Santiago. A product of Universidad Católica, Soza was loaned out and made his professional debut with Deportes Copiapó in 2018. The next year, he renewed with them.

In 2020, Soza signed with Deportes Antofagasta in the Chilean top level. In 2022, he was loaned out to San Luis de Quillota. He ended his contract with Deportes Antofagasta in 2024.

Soza signed with Coquimbo Unido for the 2025 season and won the 2025 league title, the first one for the club.

== International career ==
In November 2014, Soza represented Chile U17 in the Copa Libertador Bernardo O'Higgins 2014 Talca-Chillán, a friendly international tournament. The next year, he represented them in the South American Championship.

In August 2019, Soza was called up to a training microcycle of the Chile under-23 team under Bernardo Redín in the context of preparations for the 2020 Pre-Olympic Tournament.

== Honours ==
Coquimbo Unido

- Chilean Primera División: 2025
- Supercopa de Chile: 2026
- Copa de La Liga: 2026
