= Joiser Arias =

Venezuelan footballer (born 1998)

Personal information
- Full name: Joiser Daniel Arias Maza
- Date of birth: 3 December 1998 (age 27)
- Place of birth: Venezuela
- Height: 1.76 m (5 ft 9 in)
- Position: Left-back

Team information
- Current team: Deportivo La Guaira

Youth career
- –2019: Caracas F.C.

Senior career*
Years	Team	Apps	(Gls)
2017–2019	Caracas F.C.	0	(0)
2019–2022	Aragua F.C.	56	(5)
2023	Alvarado	8	(0)
2024-	Deportivo La Guaira	44	(3)

International career^{‡}
2015	Venezuela U17	3	(0)
- * Club domestic league appearances and goals as of 8 August 2022 ‡ National team caps and goals as of 8 August 2022

Joiser Daniel Arias Maza (born 3 December 1998) is a Venezuelan footballer who plays as a defender for Deportivo La Guaira in the Venezuelan Primera División.

== Career ==
=== Early career ===
Arias spent much of his youth career with hometown club Caracas. Despite appearing in the matchday squad for the club several times between 2017 and 2018, he never made a first-team appearance for the club.

=== Aragua ===
In January 2019, Arias joined Primera División club Aragua. He made his professional debut for the club on 3 February 2019, coming on as a 73rd-minute substitute for Rafael Arace in a 2–1 defeat to Trujillanos. He would score his first professional goal for the club the following season, scoring in the 24th minute of a 2–1 victory over Portuguesa.

== Career statistics ==
=== Club ===
As of match played 4 August 2022

Appearances and goals by club, season and competition
Club	Season	League			Cup		Continental		Other		Total	
Club	Season	Division	Apps	Goals	Apps	Goals	Apps	Goals	Apps	Goals	Apps	Goals
Caracas	2017	Venezuelan Primera División	0	0	—		—		—		0	0
Caracas	2018	Venezuelan Primera División	0	0	—		—		—		0	0
Caracas	Total		0	0	—		—		—		0	0
Aragua	2019	Venezuelan Primera División	7	0	—		—		—		7	0
Aragua	2020	Venezuelan Primera División	8 (Note: Arias made 3 appearances during the regular season, which was declared null and void by the FVF on 15 May 2020 due to the COVID-19 pandemic. These appearances are therefore not included.)	3	—		1 (Note: Includes appearance(s) in the Copa Sudamericana)	0	—		9	3
Aragua	2021	Venezuelan Primera División	8	1	—		5	0	7 (Note: Includes appearances in the Venezuelan Primera División Fase Final B)	0	20	1
Aragua	2022	Venezuelan Primera División	18	1	—		—		—		18	1
Aragua	Total		41	5	—		6	0	7	0	54	5
Career total			41	5	—		6	0	7	0	54	5
