= Zé Marcos =

Brazilian footballer

Personal information
- Full name: José Marcos Alves Luis
- Date of birth: 1 February 1998 (age 28)
- Place of birth: Americana, Brazil
- Height: 1.87 m (6 ft 2 in)
- Position: Centre-back

Team information
- Current team: Vitória

Youth career
- 2012–2016: Atlético Paranaense

Senior career*
Years	Team	Apps	(Gls)
2015–2017	Atlético Paranaense	0	(0)
2017–2019	Red Star Belgrade	0	(0)
2018	→ Rad (loan)	7	(1)
2019	→ Grbalj (loan)	13	(1)
2019–2021	Avaí	10	(1)
2021–2022	Criciúma	16	(2)
2023–2024	Juventude	69	(1)
2025–	Vitória	36	(1)
2026	→ Sport Recife (loan)	13	(0)

International career
2013	Brazil U15		
2015	Brazil U17	8	(0)
Medal record
Gold medal – first place	South American Under-17 Football Championship	2015
- * Club domestic league appearances and goals as of 4 July 2026

José Marcos Alves Luis (born 1 February 1998), commonly known as Zé Marcos, is a Brazilian professional footballer who plays as a central defender for Vitória.

== Club career ==
Born in Paraná, Brazil, Zé Marcos started playing football in Curitiba, where he played in Atlético Paranaense academy. He played with Atlético Paranaense U15 side in 2012 and 2013, and next he played with the U17 side in 2014 and 2015. In 2015 he was promoted to the main team, however, he failed to debut having been twice an unused substitute in Atlético games in the 2015 Campeonato Paranaense. In 2016 he was active with the Atlético Paranaense U20 side.

In summer 2017, Zé Marcos moved to Europe and joined Red Star Belgrade. He signed a four-year professional contract with the club on 7 July 2017. He was training with first squad in the first half of the 2017–18 season, but failed to make any official appearance for the club until the end of 2017. In the mid-season, he was loaned to Rad for the rest of the 2017–18 Serbian SuperLiga campaign, as the first foreign footballer (Note: Does not include players from countries which formed after disintegration of the Socialist Federal Republic of Yugoslavia, players with dual citizenship and youth team members) after five years. Zé Marcos made his professional debut for Rad in 1–1 draw to Radnik Surdulica on 17 February 2018. He scored his first senior goal in 5–0 victory over Borac Čačak in 25th SuperLiga fixture, played on 3 March 2018. Following the end of season, Zé Marcos returned to Red Star. On the last day of the summer transfer window 2018, he moved on new loan to Rad until the end of the calendar year.

== International career ==
Zé Marcos played with Brazilian under-15 national team at the 2013 South American Under-15 Football Championship. Next, Zé Marcos was a member of Brazilian under-17 national team in 2015. He appeared in the 2015 South American Under-17 Football Championship, helping Brazil to win the competition. He also led the team as a captain in the 2015 FIFA U-17 World Cup.

== Style of play ==
Standing at 6-foot-2-inches (1.88 m), Zé Marcos is a left-footed footballer, who mainly operates as a centre-back. Although he has started playing football as a left-back, he adapted in the middle of defence due to his high. He is characterised as dominant in positioning, having good heading abilities, as also leadership characteristics. He is also described as a fast player with solid technique, dangerous in the offensive interruptions.

== Career statistics ==
=== Club ===
As of 30 March 2018

Appearances and goals by club, season and competition
Club	Season	League			Cup		Continental		Other		Total	
Club	Season	Division	Apps	Goals	Apps	Goals	Apps	Goals	Apps	Goals	Apps	Goals
Atlético Paranaense	2015	Série A	0	0	0	0	0	0	0	0	0	0
Atlético Paranaense	2016	Série A	0	0	0	0	0	0	0	0	0	0
Atlético Paranaense	2017	Série A	0	0	0	0	0	0	0	0	0	0
Atlético Paranaense	Total		0	0	0	0	0	0	0	0	0	0
Red Star Belgrade	2017–18	Serbian SuperLiga	0	0	0	0	0	0	—		0	0
Red Star Belgrade	2018–19	Serbian SuperLiga	0	0	—		0	0	—		0	0
Red Star Belgrade	Total		0	0	0	0	0	0	—		0	0
Rad (loan)	2017–18	Serbian SuperLiga	7	1	—		—		—		7	1
Rad (loan)	2018–19	Serbian SuperLiga	0	0	0	0	—		—		0	0
Rad (loan)	Total		7	1	0	0	—		—		7	1
Career total			7	1	0	0	0	0	0	0	7	1

== Honours ==
Brazil U17

- South American Under-17 Football Championship: 2015

Criciúma

- Campeonato Catarinense Série B: 2022
