= Estadio Lic. Erico Galeano Segovia =

Football stadium in Capiatá, Paraguay

Coordinates: 25.3499°S 57.4353°W

Lic. Erico Galeano Segovia
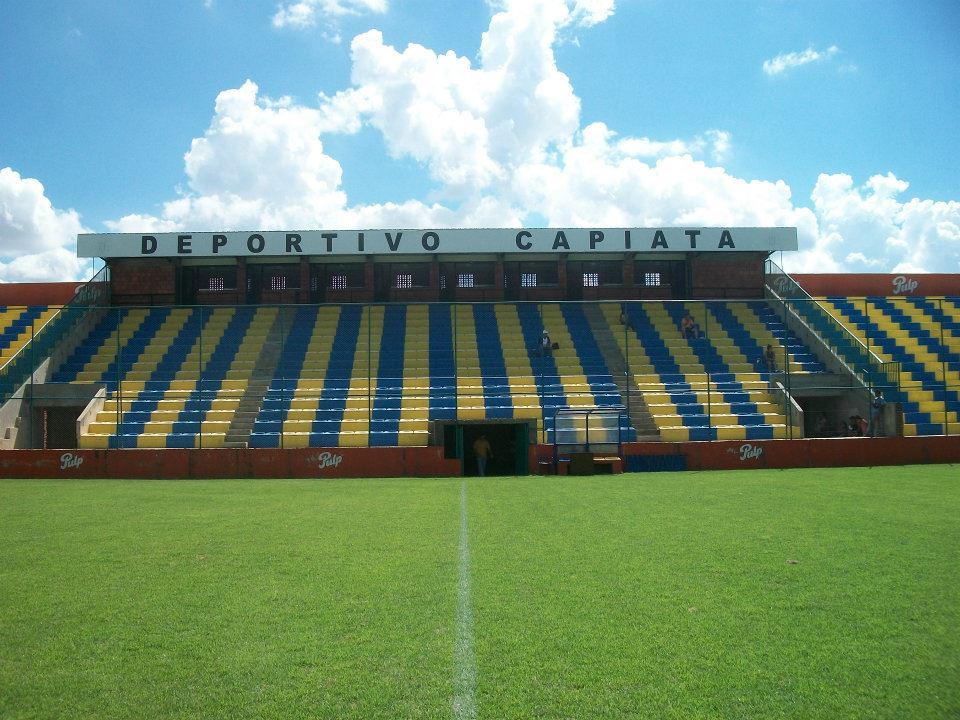
- Interactive map of Lic. Erico Galeano Segovia
- Full name: Estadio Lic. Erico Galeano Segovia
- Owner: Deportivo Capiatá
- Capacity: 10,000 since most recent renovation works

Construction
- Opened: 2009

Tenant
- Deportivo Capiatá

Estadio Lic. Erico Galeano Segovia is a football stadium in the city of Capiatá, Paraguay. It is the home venue of Deportivo Capiatá.
