= Josep Maria Forn =

Spanish actor (1928–2021)

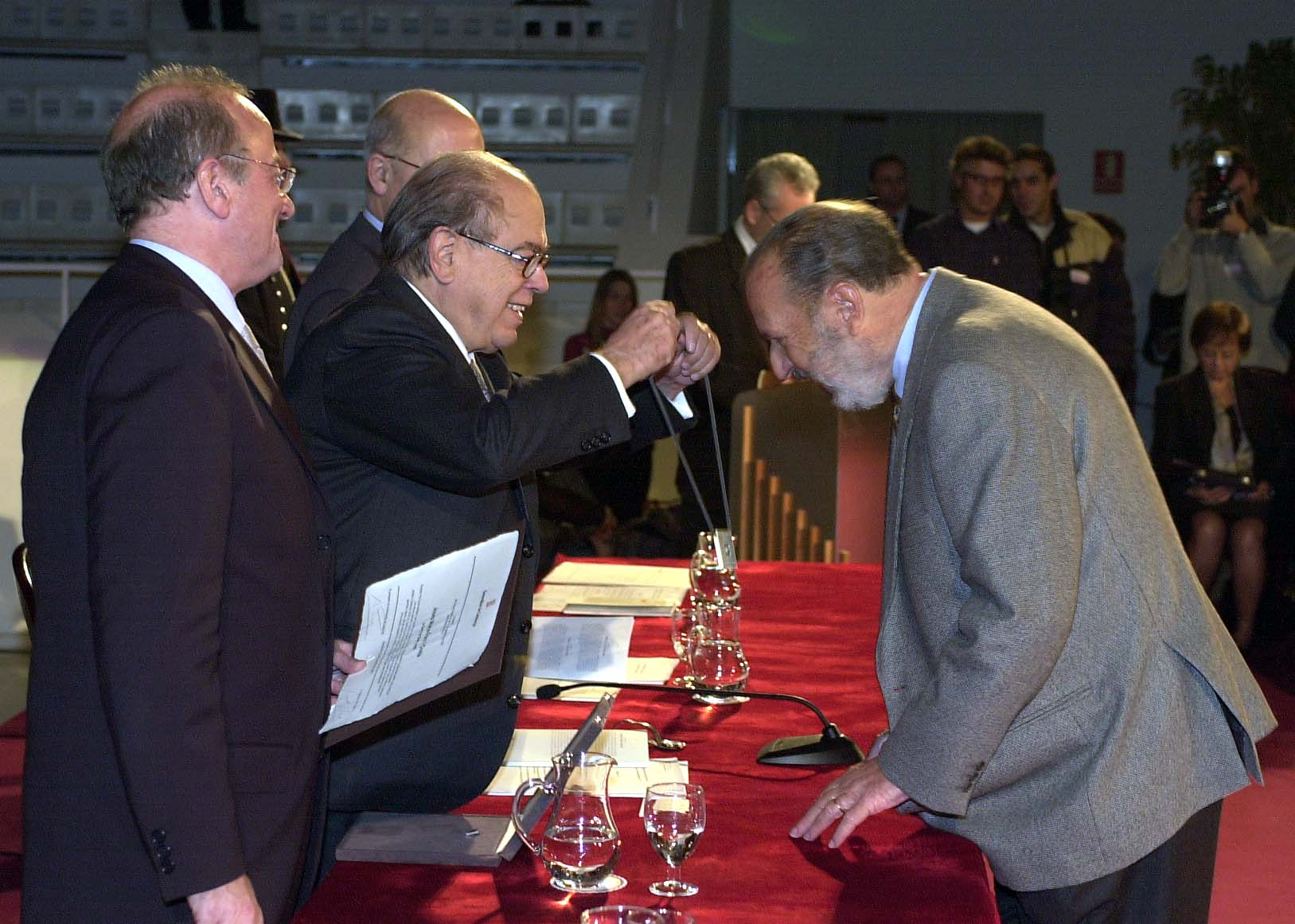
Josep Maria Forn.jpg

Josep Maria Forn i Costa (Catalan pronunciation: [ʒuˈzɛb məˈɾi.ə ˈfoɾn]; April 4, 1928 – October 3, 2021) was a Spanish actor, film producer and film director.

He was born in Barcelona, and began making movies in the 1950s with the short-film Gaudí (1954) and some commercial movies. His film, La piel quemada (Burnt Skin) (1967), dealt with the migration to Catalonia from other parts of Spain, and was very successful besides the Franco's censorship.

In 1975, he became the founder and president of Institut de Cinema Català. From 1987 to 1991, he was the director of the cinematography department in the Generalitat de Catalunya, and in 1994, president of Catalan Film Directors College.

He received the Creu de Sant Jordi Award by the Catalan Government in 2001.

== Filmography ==
=== Director ===
- 1957: Yo maté
- 1959: Muerte al amanecer
- 1960: La vida privada de Fulano de Tal
- 1960: La rana verde
- 1961: ¿Pena de muerte?
- 1962: La ruta de los narcóticos
- 1962: Los culpables
- 1963: José María
- 1964: La barca sin pescador
- 1967: La piel quemada
- 1975: La respuesta
- 1979: Companys, procés a Catalunya
- 1991: Ho sap el ministre?
- 1998: Subjúdice
- 2006: El coronel Macià

=== Actor ===
- 1978: La ràbia
- 1978: Serenata a la claror de la lluna
- 1979: Alicia en la España de las maravillas
- 1980: La campanada
- 1981: Un drac, Sant Jordi i el cavaller Kaskarlata
- 1982: Puny clos
- 1983: Como un adiós
- 1985: Un, dos, tres... ensaïmades i res més
