= Branco Provoste =

Chilean footballer (born 2000)

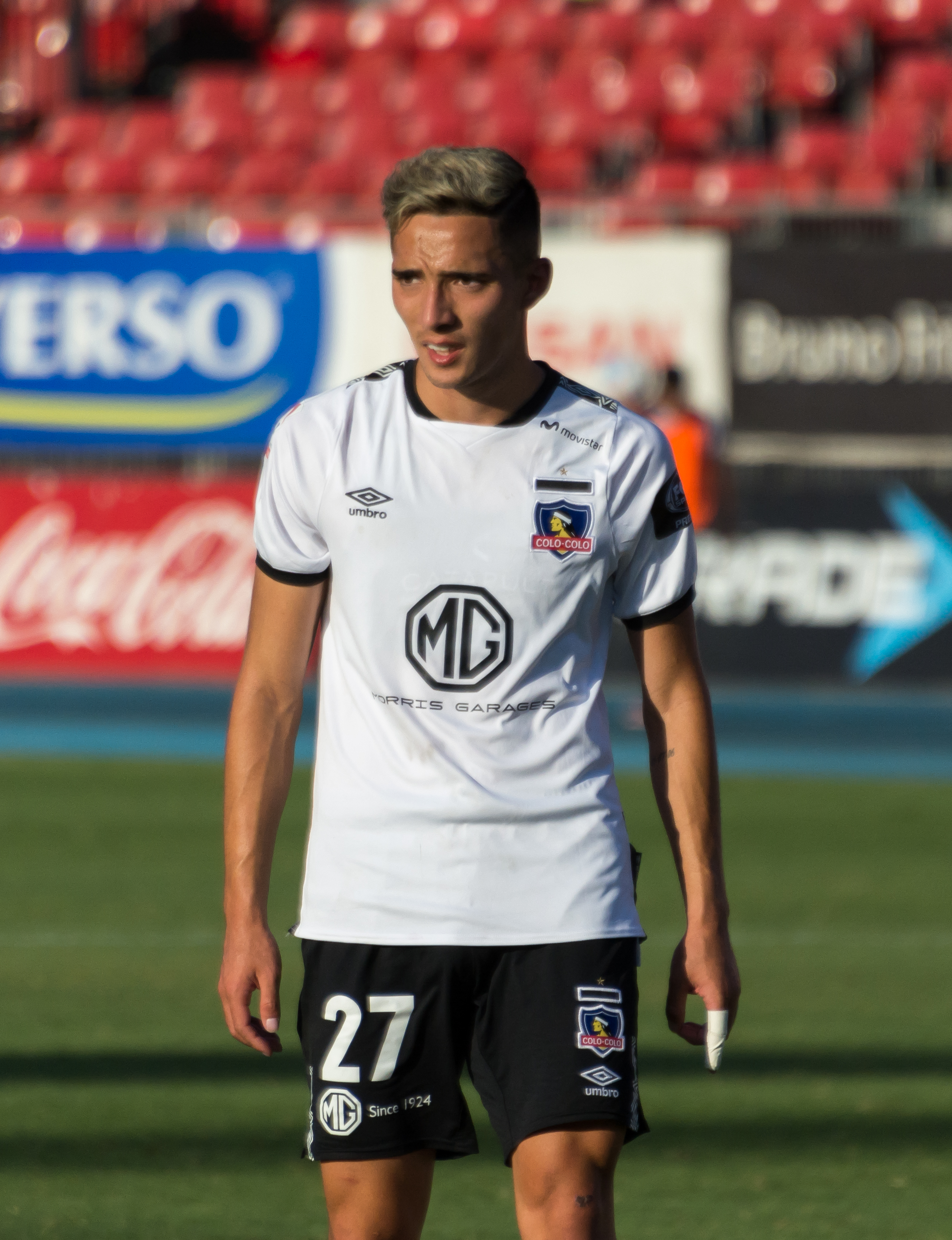
- Provoste with Colo-Colo in 2020

Personal information
- Full name: Branco Antonio Provoste Ovalle
- Date of birth: 14 April 2000 (age 26)
- Place of birth: Santiago, Chile
- Height: 1.77 m (5 ft 10 in)
- Position: Midfielder

Team information
- Current team: Deportes Recoleta

Youth career
- Colo-Colo

Senior career*
Years	Team	Apps	(Gls)
2016–2020	Colo-Colo	24	(0)
2021–2023	Ñublense	41	(1)
2024–2025	Deportes Limache	12	(0)
2025	→ Cobreloa (loan)	11	(1)
2026–	Deportes Recoleta	0	(0)

International career^{‡}
2015	Chile U15		
2015–2017	Chile U17	18	(1)
- * Club domestic league appearances and goals as of 18 December 2025 ‡ National team caps and goals as of 11 October 2017

Branco Antonio Provoste Ovalle (born April 14, 2000) is a Chilean football player who plays as a midfielder for Deportes Recoleta.

== Club career ==
In 2021, Provoste signed with Ñublense in the Chilean Primera División until 2023.

In June 2024, Provoste joined Deportes Limache in the Primera B. He was loaned out to Cobreloa for the second half of 2025.

On 23 December 2025, Provoste joined Deportes Recoleta.

== International career ==
At early age, he represented Chile at under-15 level at the 2015 South American U-15 Championship and Chile U17 at the 2015 South American U-17 Championship, at two friendly matches against USA U17, at the 2017 South American U-17 Championship – Chile was the runner-up – and at the 2017 FIFA U-17 World Cup. Also, he played all the matches for Chile U17 at the friendly tournament Lafarge Foot Avenir 2017 in France, better known as Tournament Limoges, where Chile became champion after defeating Belgium U18 and Poland U18 and drawing France U18.

== Personal life ==
Provoste is married to the Chilean former footballer Fernanda Contreras.

== Career statistics ==
As of matches played on 12 December 2020.

Club	Season	League			Cup		Continental		Other		Total	
Club	Season	Division	Apps	Goals	Apps	Goals	Apps	Goals	Apps	Goals	Apps	Goals
Colo-Colo	2016–17	Primera División	4	0	1	0	0	0	0	0	5	0
Colo-Colo	2017–T	Primera División	0	0	0	0	0	0	0	0	0	0
Colo-Colo	2018	Primera División	3	0	1	0	0	0	1 (Note: Appearances in the Supercopa de Chile)	0	5	0
Colo-Colo	2019	Primera División	5	0	7	0	0	0	0	0	12	0
Colo-Colo	2020	Primera División	12	0	—		1 (Note: Appearances in the Copa Libertadores)	0	0	0	13	0
Colo-Colo	Total		24	0	9 (Note: Appearances in the Copa Chile)	0	1	0	1	0	35	0
Ñublense	2021	Primera División	0	0	0	0	—		0	0	0	0
Total career			24	0	9	0	1	0	1	0	35	0

== Honours ==
Colo-Colo

- Primera División (1): 2017–T
- Copa Chile (2): 2016, 2017
- Supercopa de Chile (2): 2017, 2018

Chile U17

- Tournoi de Limoges: 2017
