= Nicolás Fernández (footballer, born 1998) =

Uruguayan footballer (born 1998)

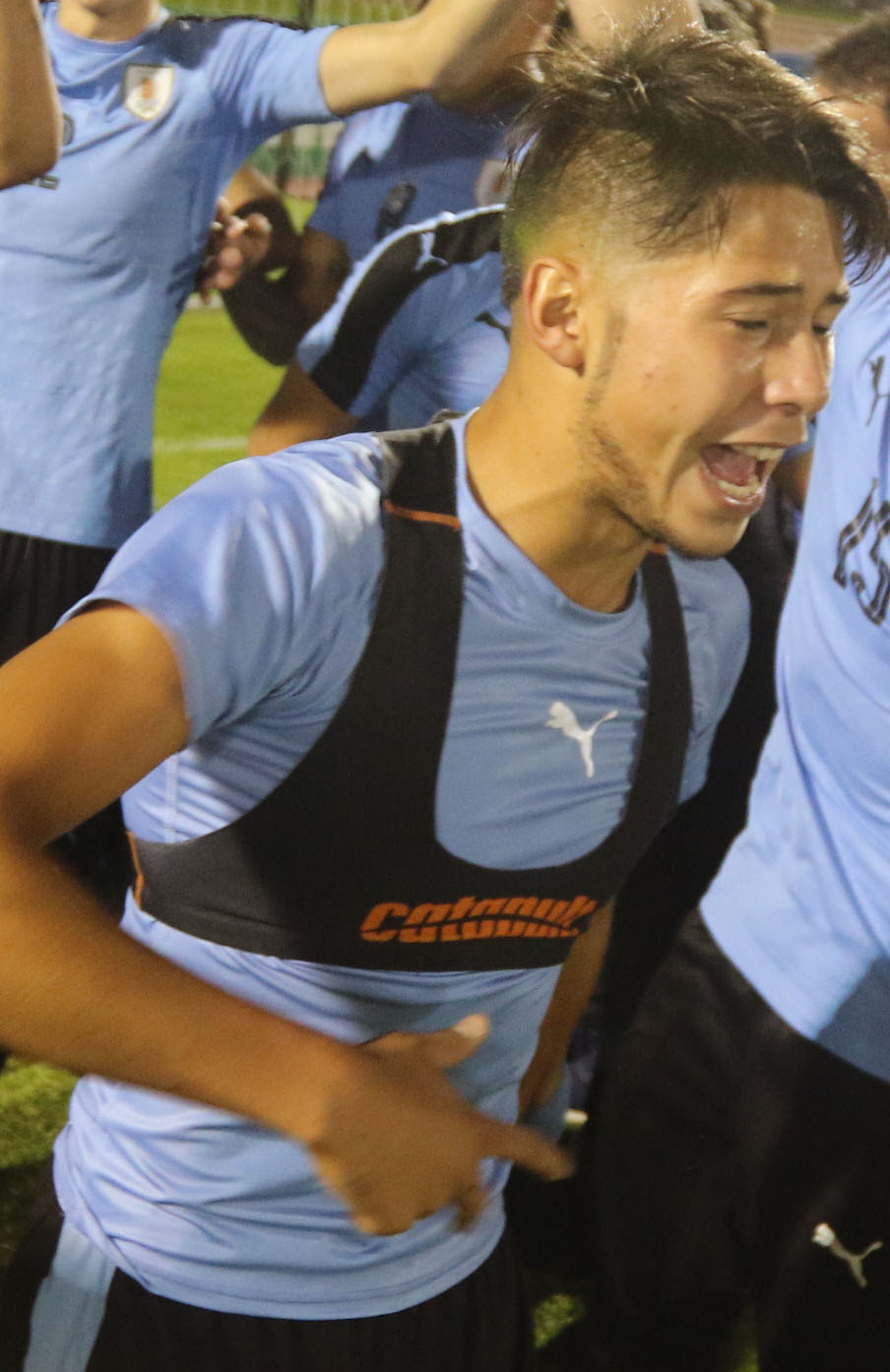
- Fernández in 2017

Personal information
- Full name: Roberto Nicolás Fernández Fagundez
- Date of birth: 2 March 1998 (age 28)
- Place of birth: Montevideo, Uruguay
- Height: 1.78 m (5 ft 10 in)
- Position: Midfielder

Team information
- Current team: Peñarol
- Number: 8

Youth career
- Carrasco Polo
- Fénix

Senior career*
Years	Team	Apps	(Gls)
2015–2024	Fénix	155	(6)
2021	→ Atenas (loan)	19	(0)
2023	→ Godoy Cruz (loan)	42	(2)
2024–2026	Godoy Cruz	58	(4)
2026–	Peñarol	2	(0)

International career
2013	Uruguay U15	20	(0)
2014–2015	Uruguay U17	20	(1)
2015	Uruguay U18	5	(0)
2015–2017	Uruguay U20	15	(0)
Medal record
Men's football
Representing Uruguay
South American U-20 Championship
Winner	2017 Ecuador
- * Club domestic league appearances and goals as of 23:49, 11 March 2026 (UTC)

Roberto Nicolás Fernández Fagundez (born 2 March 1998) is a Uruguayan professional footballer who plays as a midfielder for Uruguayan Primera División club Peñarol.

== Career ==
Fernández made his professional debut on 24 October 2015, in a 1–1 draw against Montevideo Wanderers. On 5 May 2018, he scored his first professional goal in a 2–0 win against Atlético Torque. Fernández made his continental debut on 18 August 2016, in a 2–0 loss against Cerro Porteño.

Fernández is a former Uruguay youth international. He was part of Uruguay under-20 team which won 2017 South American U-20 Championship. He has also represented his nation at 2013 South American U-15 Championship and 2015 South American U-17 Championship.
