= Ramon (footballer, born 1998) =

Brazilian footballer

Personal information
- Full name: Ramon de Araújo Siqueira
- Date of birth: 19 September 1998 (age 28)
- Place of birth: Rio de Janeiro, Brazil
- Height: 1.72 m (5 ft 7 1/2 in)
- Position: Forward

Youth career
- 2006–2018: Fluminense

Senior career*
Years	Team	Apps	(Gls)
2018–2019	Fluminense	1	(0)
2019	→ CSA (loan)	2	(0)
2019	→ FC Ryukyu (loan)	9	(0)
2020–2022	FC Ryukyu	6	(0)
2020	→ Gainare Tottori (loan)	5	(0)
2022–2023	Guayaquil City	19	(3)
2023	Boavista	2	(0)
2023	Al-Jeel	0	(0)

International career
2015	Brazil U17	6	(1)
Medal record
Representing Brazil
Winner	South American U-17 Championship	2015
- * Club domestic league appearances and goals as of 17:06, 19 October 2020 (UTC)

Ramon de Araújo Siqueira (born 19 September 1998), commonly known as Ramon, is a Brazilian footballer who currently plays as a forward.

== Club career ==
In 2018, Ramon agreed a deal to sign with Spanish giants Real Madrid on a one-year loan deal, in which he would have played for their Castilla team. However, this deal fell through due to a knee injury found during his medical.

In 2019, Ramon joined Japanese second division side FC Ryukyu for the remainder of the J2 League season in their bid the avoid relegation. In 2020 Ramon joined FC Ryukyu on a permanent basis after his contract at Fluminense expired.

On 27 July 2023, Ramon joined Saudi Second Division side Al-Jeel.

== International career ==
Ramon represented Brazil at the 2015 South American Under-17 Football Championship.

== Career statistics ==
=== Club ===
As of 29 February 2020.

Club	Season	League			State League		Cup		Continental		Other		Total	
Club	Season	Division	Apps	Goals	Apps	Goals	Apps	Goals	Apps	Goals	Apps	Goals	Apps	Goals
Fluminense	2018	Série A	0	0	1 (Note: Appearances in the Campeonato Carioca)	0	0	0	–		0	0	1	0
Fluminense	2019	Série A	0	0	0	0	0	0	–		0	0	0	0
Fluminense	Total		0	0	1	0	0	0	0	0	0	0	1	0
CSA (loan)	2019	Série A	0	0	2 (Note: Appearances in the Campeonato Alagoano)	0	0	0	–		1 (Note: Appearances in the Copa do Nordeste)	0	3	0
FC Ryukyu (loan)	2019	J2 League	9	0	–		0	0	–		0	0	9	0
FC Ryukyu	2020	J2 League	0	0	–		0	0	–		0	0	0	0
Gainare Tottori (loan)	2020	J3 League	0	0	–		0	0	–		0	0	0	0
Career total			9	0	3	0	0	0	0	0	1	0	13	0
