= Washington Corozo =

Ecuadorian footballer (born 1998)

Personal information
- Full name: Washington Bryan Corozo Becerra
- Date of birth: 9 July 1998 (age 28)
- Place of birth: Guayaquil, Ecuador
- Height: 1.80 m (5 ft 11 in)
- Position: Winger

Team information
- Current team: C.S. Emelec
- Number: 7

Youth career
- 2009–2010: Academia Alfaro Moreno
- 2011: Norte America
- 2012–2016: Independiente del Valle

Senior career*
Years	Team	Apps	(Gls)
2015–2019	Independiente del Valle	53	(6)
2020–2023	Sporting Cristal	41	(8)
2021–2022	→ UNAM (loan)	34	(7)
2022	→ Austin FC (loan)	3	(0)
2024–	Emelec	34	(4)

International career^{‡}
2015	Ecuador U17	5	(2)
2016–2017	Ecuador U20	15	(1)
2021–	Ecuador	1	(0)
- * Club domestic league appearances and goals as of 20 August 2025 ‡ National team caps and goals as of 2 September 2021

Washington Bryan Corozo Becerra (born 9 July 1998) is an Ecuadorian professional footballer who plays as a winger for Emelec.

== Club career ==
=== Early career ===
Born in Guayaquil, Ecuador, Corozo started his football career in 2009 at Academia Alfaro Moreno, owned by former footballer Carlos Alfaro Moreno. In 2011, he moved to club Norte America, which transferred him to Independiente del Valle (known as Independiente José Terán at that time) in 2012, where he began playing in the under-14 category. Corozo went through all the youth divisions of Independiente del Valle as well as the reserve team until reaching the first team.

=== Independiente del Valle ===
At the age of seventeen, Corozo made his professional debut with Independiente del Valle in a 2–0 home win against Deportivo Cuenca on 6 December 2015, coming on as a substitute in the second half for Bryan Cabezas. In 2016, he joined to the first team of Independiente del Valle and scores his first goal in the professional football in a 5–2 away loss against El Nacional.

He remained in the team until 2019 playing several matches in the Ecuadorian Serie A. He also participated with his team in the 2016 U-20 Copa Libertadores and 2018 Copa Libertadores. In 2019, he was part of the Copa Sudamericana title won by Independiente del Valle.

During the time at Independiente del Valle he made a total of 62 appearances (53 in Serie A and 9 in international events) and scored 6 goals, all in the local league.

=== Sporting Cristal ===
On 10 January 2020, Peruvian side Sporting Cristal announced that it had reached a deal with Independiente del Valle for which Corozo signed a 4-year contract with his new team. He made his debut and scored his first goal with Sporting Cristal in a Liga 1 match against UTC on 1 February 2020, starting in a 2–1 away loss. On 7 February 2020, he started in the 2020 Copa Libertadores second stage first leg match against Ecuadorian side Barcelona, which ended in a 4–0 away loss. He was not considered for the second leg and eventually his team was eliminated at that stage. However, under the management of Sporting Cristal new coach Roberto Mosquera, Corozo became a regular starting player in the Liga 1 and finished the season with 28 appearances and 8 goals scored, helping Sporting Cristal win the 2020 Liga 1 title.

== International career ==
Corozo was part of both Under-17 and Under-20 teams of Ecuador and participated in the corresponding U-17 and U-20 South American and World Cup championships in 2015 and 2017 respectively.

On 20 February 2015, he was included in the 22-man squad of Ecuador under-17 by manager Javier Rodríguez for the 2015 South American U-17 Championship held in Paraguay. Corozo scored three goals in that tournament and Ecuador finished third, thus qualifying for the 2015 FIFA U-17 World Cup in Chile. Corozo was also part of Ecuador U-17 squad at the U-17 World Cup, in which he scored two goals and Ecuador reached the quarter-finals being eliminated by Mexico.

On 3 January 2017, Corozo was called up by coach Javier Rodriguez for the Ecuador under-20 team to participate in the 2017 South American U-20 Championship held in his country Ecuador. He played all nine matches of the tournament scoring one goal, helping Ecuador finish as runners-up and qualifying for the 2017 FIFA U-20 World Cup in South Korea. Corozo was also part of Ecuador U-20 squad at the U-20 World Cup, in which he made 3 appearances without scoring goals, while Ecuador were eliminated in the group stage.

He made his debut for the senior national team on 2 September 2021 in a World Cup qualifier against Paraguay, a 2–0 home victory. He substituted Joao Rojas in the 65th minute.

== Honours ==
Independiente del Valle

- Copa Sudamericana: 2019

Sporting Cristal

- Liga 1: 2020
