= Ribeirão Claro =

Coordinates: 23.1939°S 49.7578°W

- Municipality
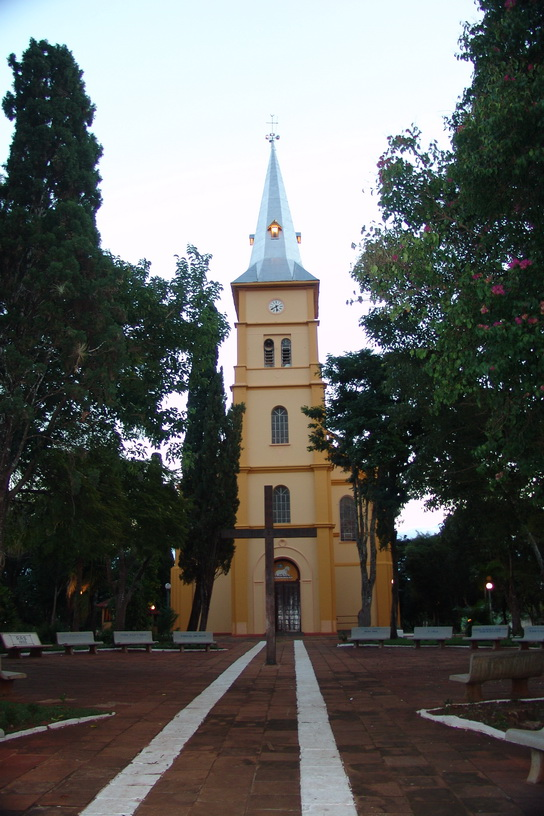

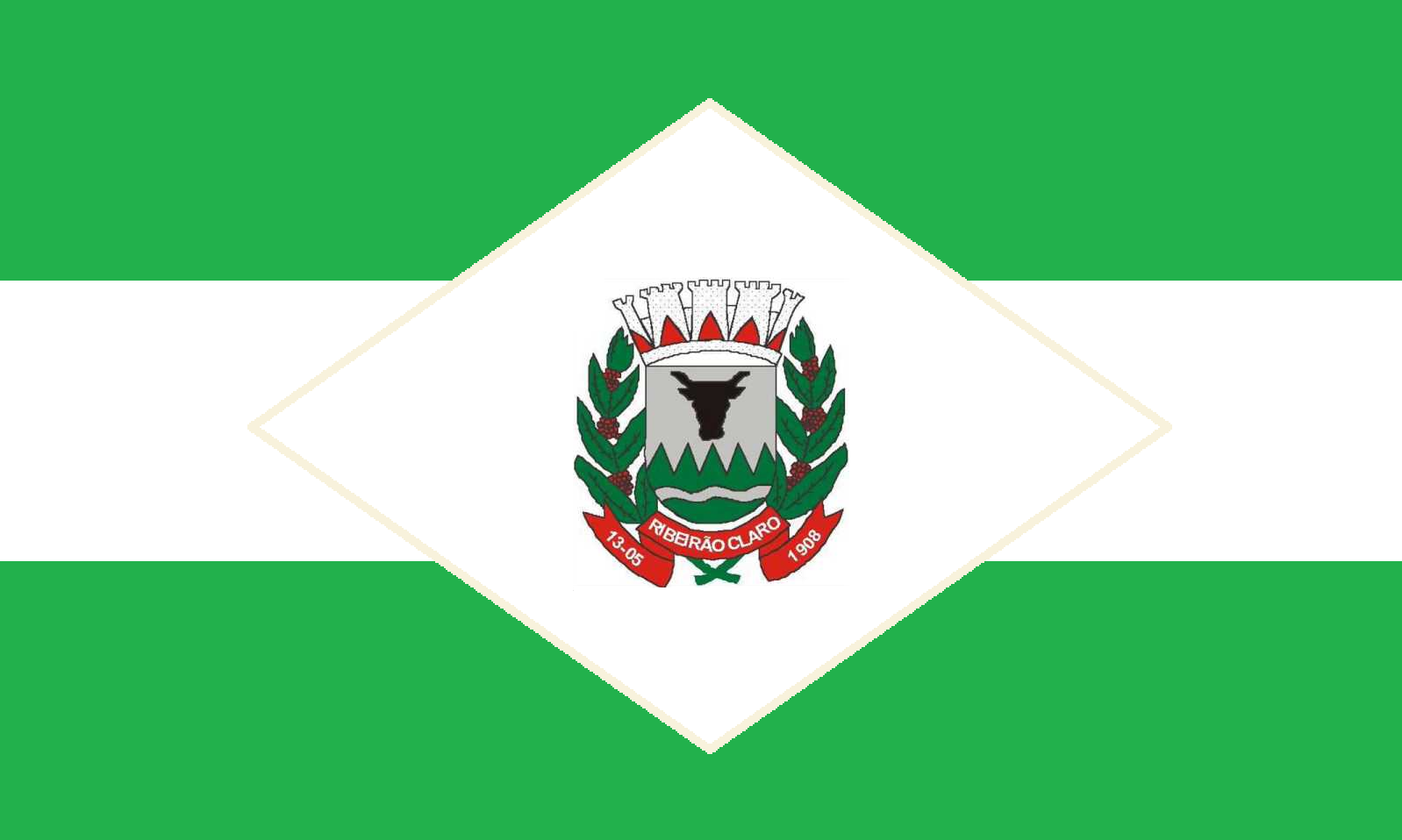
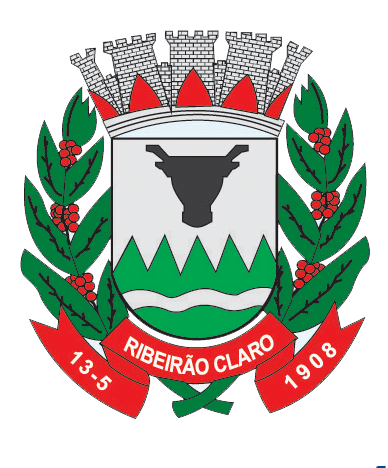
- Flag Coat of arms
- Interactive map of Ribeirão Claro
- Country: Brazil
- Region: Southern
- State: Paraná
- Mesoregion: Norte Pioneiro Paranaense

Population (2020)
  - Total: 10,645
- Time zone: UTC−3 (BRT)

Ribeirão Claro is a municipality in the state of Paraná in the Southern Region of Brazil.

== See also ==
- List of municipalities in Paraná
