= Federico Bonansea =

Argentine professional footballer (born 1998)

Personal information
- Date of birth: 13 March 1998 (age 28)
- Place of birth: Dalmacio Vélez Sarsfield, Argentina
- Height: 1.86 m (6 ft 1 in)
- Position: Goalkeeper

Team information
- Current team: San Martín SJ

Youth career
- Fray Nicasio Gutiérrez
- All Boys (VM)
- Estudiantes (H)
- 2010–2016: Belgrano

Senior career*
Years	Team	Apps	(Gls)
2016–2019	Belgrano	0	(0)
2016–2017	→ Villarreal C (loan)	4	(0)
2019	Moralo	1	(0)
2020–2022	Unión Santa Fe	2	(0)
2022	→ Agropecuario (loan)	0	(0)
2023–	San Martín SJ	1	(0)

International career
2015	Argentina U17		
- * Club domestic league appearances and goals as of 29 September 2024

Federico Bonansea (born 13 March 1998) is an Argentine professional footballer who plays as a goalkeeper for San Martín de San Juan.

== Career ==
Bonansea started his youth career in his hometown with Fray Nicasio Gutiérrez, which preceded stints with All Boys de Villa María and Estudiantes de Hernando. In 2010, he joined Belgrano's academy. In July 2016, Bonansea was loaned to Spanish football with Tercera División team Villarreal C. He made his debut on 23 October in a 4–0 home win against Segorbe, which was followed by further appearances against Rayo Ibense, Segorbe (away) and Muro. During his time there, the goalkeeper was an unused substitute thirty-two times. Bonansea returned to Belgrano in July 2017, though would depart two years later.

July 2019 saw Bonansea return to Spain with Moralo. He'd appear just once, playing all of a 9–2 away win versus Valdivia on 9 November 2019. In January 2020, Bonansea returned to his homeland with Primera División side Unión Santa Fe. After being on the bench for a Copa Sudamericana defeat to Emelec in October, he made his competitive Unión debut on 20 November against Arsenal de Sarandí. In January 2022, Bonansea joined Primera Nacional club Agropecuario on a one-year loan deal.

== International career ==
In 2015, Bonansea was called up to represent Argentina at the South American U-17 Championship and FIFA U-17 World Cup; though didn't appear at either tournament. He also trained with the senior squad at the 2015 Copa América.

== Career statistics ==
As of 21 November 2020.

Appearances and goals by club, season and competition
Club	Season	League			Cup		League Cup		Continental		Other		Total	
Club	Season	Division	Apps	Goals	Apps	Goals	Apps	Goals	Apps	Goals	Apps	Goals	Apps	Goals
Belgrano	2016–17	Primera División	0	0	0	0	—		0	0	0	0	0	0
Belgrano	2017–18	Primera División	0	0	0	0	—		—		0	0	0	0
Belgrano	2018–19	Primera División	0	0	0	0	—		—		0	0	0	0
Belgrano	total		0	0	0	0	—		0	0	0	0	0	0
Villarreal C (loan)	2016–17	Tercera División	4	0	—		—		—		0	0	4	0
Moralo	2019–20	Tercera División	1	0	0	0	0	0	—		0	0	1	0
Unión Santa Fe	2019–20	Primera División	0	0	0	0	0	0	0	0	0	0	0	0
Unión Santa Fe	2020–21 (Note: Soccerway counts Copa de la Liga Profesional appearances as league appearances.)	Primera División	1	0	0	0	0	0	0	0	0	0	1	0
Unión Santa Fe	total		1	0	0	0	0	0	0	0	0	0	1	0
Career total			6	0	0	0	0	0	0	0	0	0	6	0
