= David Salazar (footballer, born 1999) =

Chilean footballer

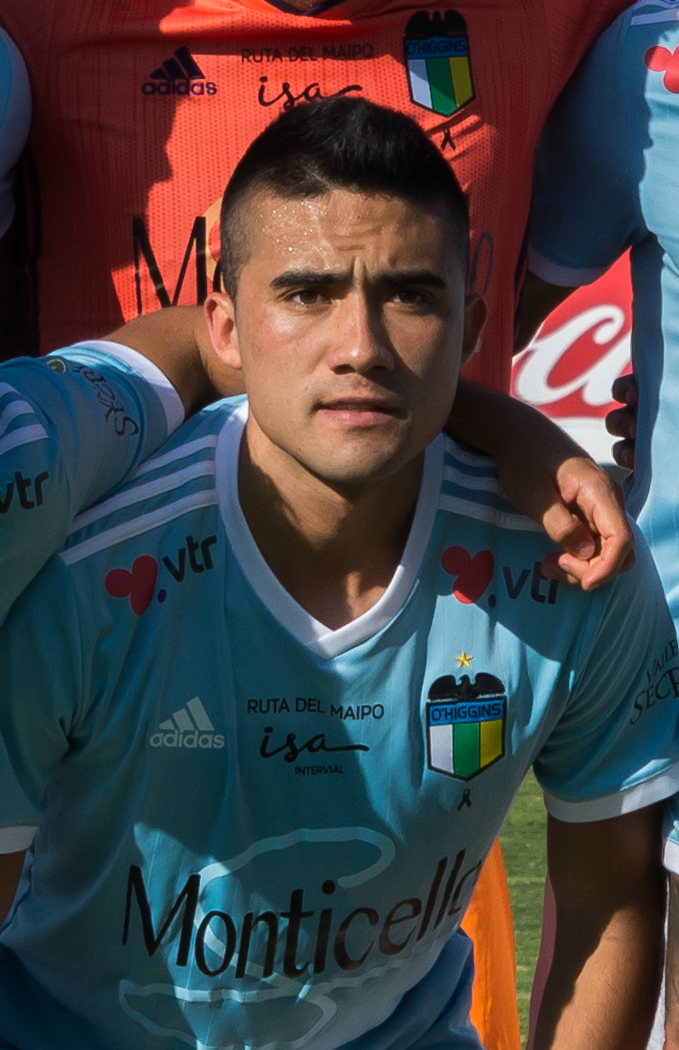
- Salazar with O'Higgins in 2019

Personal information
- Full name: David Andrés Salazar Bustamante
- Date of birth: 19 April 1999 (age 27)
- Place of birth: Lo Miranda, Chile
- Height: 1.80 m (5 ft 11 in)
- Position: Forward

Team information
- Current team: Deportes Rengo

Youth career
- O'Higgins

Senior career*
Years	Team	Apps	(Gls)
2016–2023	O'Higgins	20	(1)
2020	→ Deportes Santa Cruz (loan)	24	(7)
2021–2022	→ Magallanes (loan)	40	(6)
2023	→ Santiago Morning (loan)	10	(1)
2024	Unión San Felipe	23	(5)
2025	Deportes Recoleta	23	(3)
2026	Provincial Ovalle	8	(0)
2026–	Deportes Rengo	0	(0)

International career^{‡}
2015	Chile U17	4	(1)
2018–2019	Chile U20	3	(0)
Medal record
Men's football
Representing Chile
South American Games
Gold medal – first place	2018 Cochabamba
- * Club domestic league appearances and goals as of 16 August 2026 ‡ National team caps and goals as of 9 November 2023

David Andrés Salazar Bustamante (born 19 April 1999) is a Chilean footballer who plays as a forward for Deportes Rengo.

== Club career ==
After ending his contract with O'Higgins in 2023, Salazar signed with Unión San Felipe for the 2024 season. The next year, he played for Deportes Recoleta.

On 28 January 2026, Salazar joined Provincial Ovalle. He switched to Deportes Rengo in August of the same year.

== International career ==
At under-20 level, Salazar represented Chile in both the 2018 South American Games, winning the gold medal, and the 2019 South American Championship.

== Honours ==
Chile U20

- South American Games Gold medal: 2018
