= Jorge Morel (footballer) =

Paraguayan footballer (born 1998)

Personal information
- Full name: Jorge Emanuel Morel Barrios
- Date of birth: 22 January 1998 (age 28)
- Place of birth: Asunción, Paraguay
- Height: 1.80 m (5 ft 11 in)
- Position: Defender

Team information
- Current team: Cerro Porteño
- Number: 5

Youth career
- Guaraní

Senior career*
Years	Team	Apps	(Gls)
2015–2023	Guaraní	145	(7)
2021	→ Lanús (loan)	20	(0)
2022	→ Estudiantes (loan)	45	(3)
2023	→ Adana Demirspor (loan)	12	(1)
2023–	Cerro Porteño	67	(3)

International career^{‡}
2015	Paraguay U17	10	(2)
2017	Paraguay U20	4	(0)
2019–	Paraguay	9	(0)
2020–	Paraguay U23	3	(0)
- * Club domestic league appearances and goals as of 12 August 2025 ‡ National team caps and goals as of 14:11, 28 September 2020 (UTC)

Jorge Emanuel Morel Barrios (born 22 January 1998) is a Paraguayan footballer who plays as a defender for Paraguayan Primera División club Cerro Porteño.

On 10 October 2019 Morel made his debut for the Paraguay national team in a 1–0 loss against Slovakia. On making his debut, Morel said in an interview “Every achievement I get marks something in my life, but debuting in the senior team so far is the best. I am very happy to accomplish this at such a young age.”

== Honours ==
Guarani

- Paraguayan Primera División: 2016 Clausura
- Copa Paraguay: 2018
