= Arturo Aranda =

Paraguayan footballer (born 1998)

Personal information
- Full name: Arturo Osvaldo Aranda Barreto
- Date of birth: 20 April 1998 (age 28)
- Place of birth: Asunción, Paraguay
- Position: Central midfielder

Team information
- Current team: Libertad
- Number: 36

Youth career
- Libertad

Senior career*
Years	Team	Apps	(Gls)
2015–	Libertad	6	(0)

International career^{‡}
2015–	Paraguay U17	15	(2)
2016–	Paraguay U23	0	(0)
- * Club domestic league appearances and goals as of 11 November 2015 ‡ National team caps and goals as of 11 November 2015

Arturo Osvaldo Aranda Barreto (born 20 April 1998) is a Paraguayan professional footballer who plays as a central midfielder for Club Libertad.
