= Caíque (footballer, born 1998) =

Brazilian footballer

Personal information
- Full name: Caíque da Silva Maria
- Date of birth: 14 June 1998 (age 28)
- Place of birth: Campinas, Brazil
- Height: 1.71 m (5 ft 7 in)
- Position: Midfielder

Team information
- Current team: Floresta
- Number: 29

Youth career
- 2007–2017: São Paulo

Senior career*
Years	Team	Apps	(Gls)
2018–2022	São Paulo	7	(0)
2019	→ Criciúma (loan)	23	(1)
2023–2024	Maringá	50	(3)
2023	→ Guarani (loan)	10	(0)
2025	Ypiranga	15	(0)
2026	Velo Clube	6	(0)
2026–	Floresta	24	(2)

International career
2015	Brazil U17	8	(0)
- * Club domestic league appearances and goals as of 9 November 2026

Caíque da Silva Maria (born 14 June 1998), known as just Caíque, is a Brazilian professional footballer who plays as a midfielder for Floresta.

== Club career ==
Born in Campinas, Caíque joined the youth academy of São Paulo FC in 2007. In 2016, he won the Copa do Brasil and Campeonato Paulista under 20 with the side. On 30 December 2017, Caíque was promoted by manager Dorival Júnior to the senior squad.

On 20 January 2018, Caíque made his first team debut against Grêmio Esportivo Novorizontino in the Paulista competition, where he failed to score from the penalty spot. In 2020 he joined Botafogo FC on a free transfer.
