= Rodi Ferreira =

Paraguayan footballer (born 1998)

Personal information
- Full name: Rodi David Ferreira
- Date of birth: 29 May 1998 (age 28)
- Place of birth: Concepción, Paraguay
- Height: 1.71 m (5 ft 7 in)
- Position: Right back

Team information
- Current team: Sportivo Luqueño
- Number: 2

Youth career
- Olimpia

Senior career*
Years	Team	Apps	(Gls)
2015–2018	Olimpia	40	(3)
2017	→ Temperley (loan)	1	(0)
2018	→ Leixões (loan)	2	(0)
2018	→ 3 de Febrero (loan)	19	(2)
2019	San Lorenzo (loan)	27	(0)
2020	Nacional (loan)	12	(0)
2021	Confiança (loan)	0	(0)
2021–	Club Guaraní	35	(1)
2023–	Sportivo Luqueño (loan)	65	(5)

International career
2015	Paraguay U17	12	(3)
2016–2017	Paraguay U20	12	(0)
- * Club domestic league appearances and goals as of 16:22, 13 Fevereiro 2021 (UTC)

Rodi Ferreira (born 29 May 1998) is a Paraguayan professional footballer who plays as a right back for Sportivo Luqueño.

== Carreira ==
=== Confiança ===
No dia 12 de Fevereiro de 2021, Foi anunciado pelo Confiança.
