= Robert Ergas =

Uruguayan footballer (born 1998)

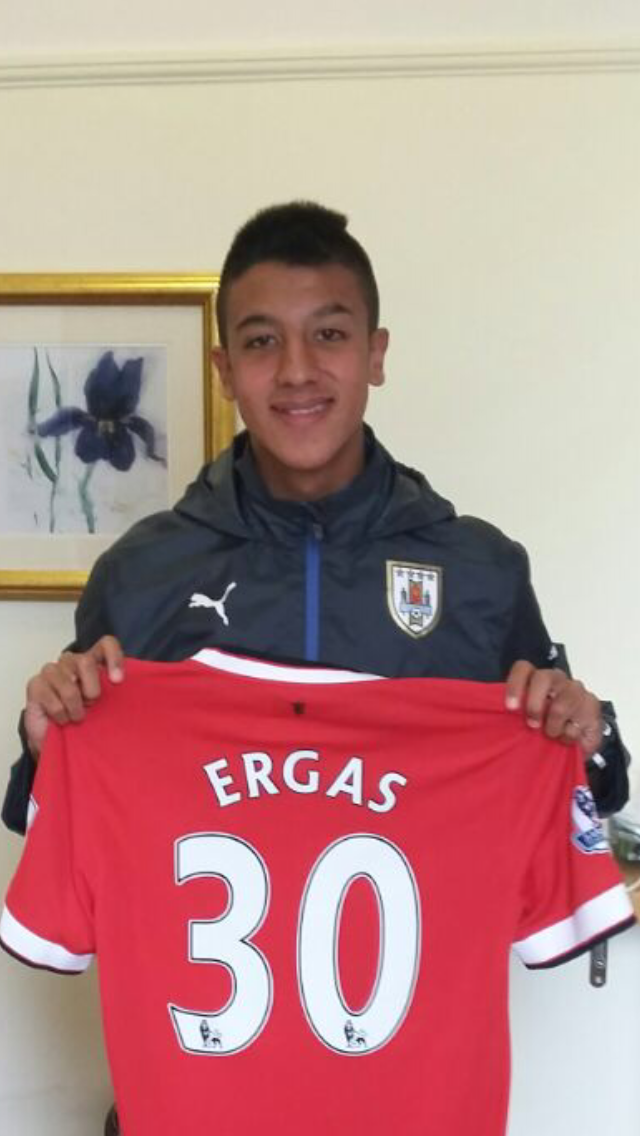
- Ergas holding his Manchester United shirt in 2015

Personal information
- Full name: Robert Ismael Ergas Moreno
- Date of birth: 15 January 1998 (age 28)
- Place of birth: Montevideo, Uruguay
- Height: 1.81 m (5 ft 11 in)
- Positions: Left-back; left winger

Youth career
- Club América
- CA Alumni
- 2010–2017: Defensor Sporting

Senior career*
Years	Team	Apps	(Gls)
2017–2023	Defensor Sporting	7	(0)
2018	→ Boston River (loan)	12	(2)
2019–2020	→ Albacete B (loan)	10	(0)
2019–2020	→ Albacete (loan)	1	(0)
2020	→ Rentistas (loan)	14	(0)
2020–2021	→ Olimpia (loan)	5	(0)
2022	→ Cerro Largo (loan)	29	(0)
2023–2025	UNAM	67	(1)
2025–2026	Aris Limassol	4	(0)

International career
2014–2015	Uruguay U17	17	(2)
2015	Uruguay U18	1	(0)
2016	Uruguay U20	3	(0)
- * Club domestic league appearances and goals as of 09:13, 27 May 2026 (UTC)

Robert Ismael Ergas Moreno (born 15 January 1998) is an Uruguayan professional footballer who plays as either a left-back or a left winger.

== Club career ==
Born in Montevideo, Ergas joined Defensor Sporting's youth setup at the age of 12, after representing Club América de Baby Fútbol and Club Atlético Alumni. In April 2015, he went on a trial at Manchester United, but nothing came of it as Defensor refused an offer from the Red Devils; subsequently, he spent almost a year sidelined due to a knee injury.

Ergas made his first team – and Primera División – debut on 5 February 2017, coming on as a late substitute for Matías Cabrera in a 1–0 home win against Rampla Juniors. For the 2018 season, he was loaned to fellow top-tier side Boston River.

Upon returning, Ergas was included in the main squad, but appeared sparingly. On 6 August 2019, he moved abroad after agreeing to a one-year loan deal with Segunda División side Albacete Balompié.

After mainly appearing for Alba's reserve team, Ergas returned to Uruguay and joined C.A. Rentistas on loan. On 23 October 2020, Ergas joined Paraguayan club Club Olimpia on loan until 31 December 2021 with an buying option.
