= Henry Vaca =

Bolivian footballer (born 1998)

Personal information
- Full name: Henry Vaca Urquiza
- Date of birth: 27 January 1998 (age 28)
- Place of birth: Santa Cruz de la Sierra, Bolivia
- Height: 1.67 m (5 ft 6 in)
- Position: Attacking midfielder

Team information
- Current team: Oriente Petrolero
- Number: 19

Youth career
- Academía Tahuichi

Senior career*
Years	Team	Apps	(Gls)
2014–2016	Calleja		
2016	O'Higgins	0	(0)
2017–2021	The Strongest	79	(9)
2019	→ Universitario (loan)	8	(0)
2020	→ Atlético Goianiense (loan)	1	(0)
2021–2023	Oriente Petrolero	47	(10)
2022	→ The Strongest (loan)	20	(4)
2023–2024	Maccabi Bnei Reineh	12	(0)
2024–2025	Bolivar	19	(2)
2025–	Oriente Petrolero	15	(1)

International career^{‡}
2015	Bolivia U17	4	(2)
2017	Bolivia U20	2	(0)
2020–	Bolivia U23	3	(0)
2018–	Bolivia	26	(1)
- * Club domestic league appearances and goals as of 30 December 2025 ‡ National team caps and goals as of 14 October 2025

Henry Vaca Urquiza (born 27 January 1998) is a Bolivian professional footballer who plays as an attacking midfielder for Oriente Petrolero.

== Career ==
Vaca made his professional debut with The Strongest in 2016. In 2019, he was loaned to Universitario. In 2020, he joined Atlético Goianiense also on loan.

On 25 June 2023 signed for the Israeli Premier League club Maccabi Bnei Reineh.

== International career ==
On 10 September 2018, Vaca made his debut for the Bolivia national football team starting in a friendly against Saudi Arabia. He scored his first goal for the national team in November 2023, during a 2–0 home win for Bolivia against Peru in a CONMEBOL 2026 FIFA World Cup qualification match.

== Career statistics ==
=== International ===
As of matches played 14 October 2025

Appearances and goals by national team and year
National team	Year	Apps	Goals
Bolivia	2018	4	0
Bolivia	2019	2	0
Bolivia	2020	1	0
Bolivia	2021	8	0
Bolivia	2022	2	0
Bolivia	2023	3	1
Bolivia	2024	1	0
Bolivia	2025	5	0
Total		26	1

=== International goals ===
No.	Date	Venue	Opponent	Score	Result	Competition
1.	16 November 2023	Estadio Hernando Siles, La Paz, Bolivia	Peru	1–0	2–0	2026 FIFA World Cup qualification

== Honours ==
The Strongest

- Bolivian Primera División: 2016–17 Apertura
