= Santiago Mederos (footballer) =

Uruguayan football player (born 1998)

Personal information
- Full name: Santiago Nicolás Mederos Pascal
- Date of birth: 16 January 1998 (age 28)
- Place of birth: Montevideo, Uruguay
- Height: 1.72 m (5 ft 8 in)
- Position: Midfielder

Team information
- Current team: Deportes Santa Cruz

Youth career
- Danubio

Senior career*
Years	Team	Apps	(Gls)
2019–2021	Danubio	62	(6)
2021	Liverpool Montevideo	6	(0)
2022	Plaza Colonia	27	(3)
2023	Deportes La Serena	25	(4)
2024	Racing Montevideo	12	(1)
2025	River Plate Montevideo	5	(0)
2025	Tacuary	15	(1)
2026–	Deportes Santa Cruz	0	(0)

International career
2012	Uruguay U15	5	(0)
2014–2015	Uruguay U17	24	(3)
- * Club domestic league appearances and goals as of 13 January 2026

Santiago Nicolás Mederos Pascal (born 16 January 1998) is a Uruguayan professional footballer who plays as a midfielder for Chilean club Deportes Santa Cruz.

== Club career ==
Mederos is a youth academy graduate of Danubio. He made his professional debut for the club on 3 March 2019 in a 1–0 league win against Cerro. He scored his first goal on 15 September 2019 in a 1–2 defeat against Cerro Largo.

On 12 January 2026, Mederos joined Chilean club Deportes Santa Cruz.

== International career ==
Mederos is a former Uruguayan youth national team player. He was part of Uruguay squad at 2015 South American U-17 Championship.

== Career statistics ==
As of 23 October 2022

Appearances and goals by club, season and competition
Club	Season	League			Cup		Continental		Total	
Club	Season	Division	Apps	Goals	Apps	Goals	Apps	Goals	Apps	Goals
Danubio	2019	Uruguayan Primera División	30	2	—		0	0	30	2
Danubio	2020	Uruguayan Primera División	28	4	—		—		28	4
Danubio	2021	Uruguayan Segunda División	4	0	—		—		4	0
Danubio	Total		62	6	0	0	0	0	62	6
Liverpool Montevideo	2021	Uruguayan Primera División	6	0	—		—		6	0
Plaza Colonia	2022	Uruguayan Primera División	27	3	3	0	0	0	30	3
Career total			95	9	3	0	0	0	98	9
