= Ronaldo Chacón =

Venezuelan footballer (born 1998)

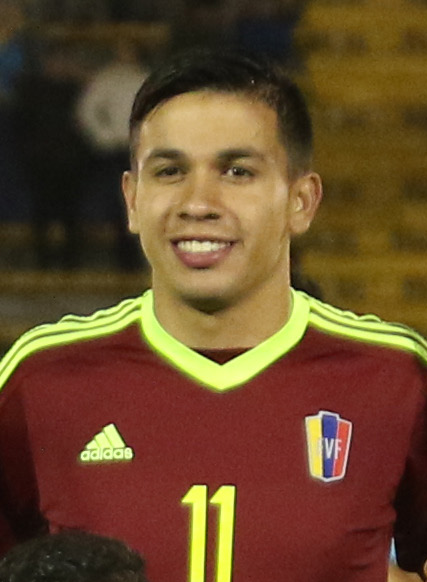
- Ronaldo Chacón (2017)

Personal information
- Full name: Ronaldo Daniel Chacón Zambrano
- Date of birth: 18 February 1998 (age 28)
- Place of birth: San Cristóbal, Táchira, Venezuela
- Height: 1.83 m (6 ft 0 in)
- Position: Forward

Team information
- Current team: Estudiantes de Mérida

Youth career
- 2008–2014: Deportivo Táchira

Senior career*
Years	Team	Apps	(Gls)
2014–2016	Deportivo Táchira	11	(1)
2016–2017	Caracas	26	(3)
2018	→ Senica (loan)	7	(0)
2019–2021	→ Academia Puerto Cabello (loan)	50	(7)
2022	Carabobo	34	(3)
2023—2024	Deportivo La Guaira	49	(4)
2025	Portuguesa	21	(5)
2025-2026	Drenica	29	(7)
2026-	Estudiantes de Mérida	11	(2)

International career^{‡}
2015	Venezuela U17	4	(3)
2017	Venezuela U20	14	(2)
2018	Venezuela U21	5	(1)
Medal record
Men's football
Representing Venezuela
FIFA U-20 World Cup
Runner-up	2017
South American U-20 Championship
Third place	2017
- * Club domestic league appearances and goals as of 9 November 2026 ‡ National team caps and goals as of 16:14, 11 June 2017 (UTC)

Ronaldo Daniel Chacón Zambrano (born 18 February 1998) is a Venezuelan footballer who plays as a forward for Estudiantes de Mérida.

== International career ==
Chacón was called up to the Venezuela under-20 side for the 2017 FIFA U-20 World Cup. He played in the final, as his side were beaten by England.

== Career statistics ==
=== Club ===
As of 20 October 2019.

Club	Season	League			Cup		Continental		Other		Total	
Club	Season	Division	Apps	Goals	Apps	Goals	Apps	Goals	Apps	Goals	Apps	Goals
Deportivo Táchira	2014–15	Primera División	1	0	0	0	–		0	0	1	0
Deportivo Táchira	2015	Primera División	7	1	1 (Note: Appearances in the Copa Venezuela)	0	–		0	0	8	1
Deportivo Táchira	2016	Primera División	3	0	0	0	–		0	0	3	0
Deportivo Táchira	Total		11	1	1	0	0	0	0	0	12	1
Caracas	2016	Primera División	2	1	0	0	–		0	0	2	1
Caracas	2017	Primera División	10	1	1	2	0	0	0	0	11	3
Caracas	2018	Primera División	14	1	1	1	2 (Note: Appearances in the Copa Sudamericana)	0	0	0	17	2
Caracas	2019	Primera División	0	0	0	0	–		0	0	0	0
Caracas	Total		26	3	2	3	2	0	0	0	30	6
Senica (loan)	2017–18	Fortuna Liga	7	0	0	0	0	0	1 (Note: Appearances in the Relegation play-offs)	1	8	1
Academia Puerto Cabello (loan)	2019	Primera División	29	7	1	1	–		0	0	30	7
Career total			10	1	0	0	0	0	0	0	10	1

== Honours ==
=== International ===
Venezuela U-20

- FIFA U-20 World Cup: Runner-up 2017
- South American Youth Football Championship: Third Place 2017
