= Luis Iriondo =

Bolivian footballer (1952-2005)

Personal information
- Date of birth: 15 December 1952
- Date of death: 6 May 2005 (aged 52)
- Position: Midfielder

International career
Years	Team	Apps	(Gls)
1973–1975	Bolivia	4	(0)

Luis Iriondo (15 December 1952 – 6 May 2005) was a Bolivian footballer. He played in four matches for the Bolivia national football team from 1973 to 1975. He was also part of Bolivia's squad for the 1975 Copa América tournament.
