= 2015 South American U-20 Championship squads =

The 2015 South American Youth Football Championship was an international association football tournament held in Uruguay. The ten national teams involved in the tournament were required to register a squad of 23 players; only players in these squads were eligible to take part in the tournament.

Each player had to have been born after 1 January 1995.

Players' names marked in bold have been capped at full international level.

== Argentina ==
Coach: Humberto Grondona (Argentina)

No.	Pos.	Player	Date of birth (age)	Club
1	GK	Augusto Batalla	30 April 1996 (aged 18)	(Argentine Football Association) River Plate
2	DF	**Emanuel Mammana**	10 February 1996 (aged 18)	(Argentine Football Association) River Plate
3	DF	Facundo Cardozo	6 April 1995 (aged 19)	(Argentine Football Association) Vélez Sarsfield
4	MF	Nicolás Tripichio	5 January 1996 (aged 18)	(Argentine Football Association) Vélez Sarsfield
5	MF	Mariano Bareiro	8 March 1995 (aged 19)	(Argentine Football Association) Racing
6	DF	Leandro Vega	27 May 1996 (aged 18)	(Argentine Football Association) River Plate
7	FW	Cristian Espinoza	3 April 1995 (aged 19)	(Argentine Football Association) Huracán
8	MF	Leonardo Rolón	19 January 1995 (aged 19)	(Argentine Football Association) Vélez Sarsfield
9	FW	**Giovanni Simeone**	5 July 1995 (aged 19)	(Argentine Football Association) River Plate
10	MF	Tomás Martínez	7 March 1995 (aged 19)	(Argentine Football Association) River Plate
11	FW	**Ángel Correa**	9 March 1995 (aged 19)	(Royal Spanish Football Federation) Atlético Madrid
12	GK	José Devecchi	1 September 1995 (aged 19)	(Argentine Football Association) San Lorenzo
13	GK	Agustín Rossi	21 August 1995 (aged 19)	(Argentine Football Association) Chacarita Juniors
14	MF	Lucio Compagnucci	23 February 1996 (aged 18)	(Argentine Football Association) Vélez Sarsfield
15	DF	Tiago Casasola	11 August 1995 (aged 19)	(The Football Association) Fulham
16	MF	Leonardo Suárez	30 March 1996 (aged 18)	(Royal Spanish Football Federation) Villarreal B
17	MF	Joaquín Ibáñez	5 September 1996 (aged 18)	(Argentine Football Association) Lanús
18	MF	Iván Leszczuk	20 February 1996 (aged 18)	(Argentine Football Association) Boca Juniors
19	FW	Rodrigo Contreras	27 October 1995 (aged 19)	(Argentine Football Association) San Lorenzo
20	DF	Facundo Monteseirín	12 March 1995 (aged 19)	(Argentine Football Association) Lanús
21	DF	Rodrigo Moreira	15 July 1996 (aged 18)	(Argentine Football Association) Independiente
22	FW	Sebastián Driussi	9 February 1996 (aged 18)	(Argentine Football Association) River Plate
23	FW	Maxi Rolón	19 January 1995 (aged 19)	(Royal Spanish Football Federation) Barcelona B

== Bolivia ==
Coach: Claudio Chacior (Argentina)

No.	Pos.	Player	Date of birth (age)	Club
1	GK	**Javier Rojas**	14 January 1996 (aged 18)	(Bolivian Football Federation) Bolívar
2	DF	**Óscar Baldomar**	16 February 1996 (aged 18)	(Bolivian Football Federation) Bolívar
3	DF	**Jordy Candia**	20 April 1996 (aged 18)	(Bolivian Football Federation) Callejas
4	DF	Jesús Carlos Flores	10 April 1996 (aged 18)	(Bolivian Football Federation) Petrolero
5	DF	**Pablo Pedraza**	10 March 1995 (aged 19)	(Bolivian Football Federation) Blooming
6	DF	Joel Bejarano	21 March 1996 (aged 18)	(Bolivian Football Federation) Blooming
7	DF	**Carlos Áñez**	6 July 1995 (aged 19)	(Bolivian Football Federation) Oriente Petrolero
8	MF	**Erwin Saavedra**	22 February 1996 (aged 18)	(Bolivian Football Federation) Bolívar
9	FW	Denis Pinto	25 September 1995 (aged 19)	(Bolivian Football Federation) Blooming
10	MF	Erick Iragua	30 November 1995 (aged 19)	(Bolivian Football Federation) Bolívar
11	FW	Rodrigo Mejido	6 May 1995 (aged 19)	(Bolivian Football Federation) Universitario de Pando
12	GK	Braulio Uraezaña	26 March 1995 (aged 19)	(Bolivian Football Federation) Blooming
13	DF	Jefferson Virreira	19 January 1997 (aged 17)	(Bolivian Football Federation) Callejas
14	MF	**Paul Arano**	23 February 1995 (aged 19)	(Bolivian Football Federation) Blooming
15	MF	Kevin Alcántara	10 May 1996 (aged 18)	(Bolivian Football Federation) Bolívar
16	MF	Miguel Paredes	1 June 1998 (aged 16)	(Bolivian Football Federation) Universitario de Pando
17	MF	**Carmelo Algañaraz**	27 January 1996 (aged 18)	(Bolivian Football Federation) Oriente Petrolero
18	FW	Alberto Pinto	25 August 1995 (aged 19)	(Bolivian Football Federation) Real Santa Cruz
19	FW	Alexis Carrasco	11 February 1995 (aged 19)	(Bolivian Football Federation) Blooming
20	MF	**Limberg Gutiérrez**	12 June 1998 (aged 16)	(Bolivian Football Federation) San Martín
21	MF	**Leonardo Vaca**	24 November 1995 (aged 19)	(Bolivian Football Federation) Blooming
22	MF	Mauricio Baldivieso	22 July 1996 (aged 18)	(Bolivian Football Federation) Jorge Wilstermann
23	GK	Pedro Galindo	13 April 1995 (aged 19)	(Bolivian Football Federation) Guabirá

== Brazil ==
Coach: Alexandre Gallo (Brazil)

No.	Pos.	Player	Date of birth (age)	Club
1	GK	Marcos Felipe	13 April 1996 (aged 18)	(Brazilian Football Confederation) Fluminense
2	DF	João Pedro	15 November 1996 (aged 18)	(Brazilian Football Confederation) Palmeiras
3	DF	Eduardo Bauermann	13 February 1996 (aged 18)	(Brazilian Football Confederation) Internacional
4	DF	Marlon	7 September 1995 (aged 19)	(Brazilian Football Confederation) Fluminense
5	MF	**Walace**	4 April 1995 (aged 19)	(Brazilian Football Confederation) Grêmio
6	DF	Caju	17 July 1995 (aged 19)	(Brazilian Football Confederation) Santos
7	FW	**Gabriel Barbosa**	30 August 1996 (aged 18)	(Brazilian Football Confederation) Santos
8	MF	Lucas Evangelista	6 February 1995 (aged 19)	(Italian Football Federation) Udinese
9	FW	Thalles	18 May 1995 (aged 19)	(Brazilian Football Confederation) Vasco da Gama
10	MF	Nathan	13 March 1996 (aged 18)	(Brazilian Football Confederation) Atlético Paranaense
11	FW	Marcos Guilherme	5 August 1995 (aged 19)	(Brazilian Football Confederation) Atlético Paranaense
12	GK	Georgemy	15 August 1995 (aged 19)	(Brazilian Football Confederation) Cruzeiro
13	DF	Auro Jr.	23 January 1996 (aged 18)	(Brazilian Football Confederation) São Paulo
14	DF	Nathan Cardoso	13 May 1995 (aged 19)	(Brazilian Football Confederation) Palmeiras
15	DF	Léo Pereira	31 January 1996 (aged 18)	(Brazilian Football Confederation) Atlético Paranaense
16	DF	Lorran	28 January 1996 (aged 18)	(Brazilian Football Confederation) Vasco da Gama
17	MF	Thiago Maia	22 March 1997 (aged 17)	(Brazilian Football Confederation) Santos
18	MF	Eduardo Henrique	17 May 1995 (aged 19)	(Brazilian Football Confederation) Atlético Mineiro
19	FW	Kenedy	8 February 1996 (aged 18)	(Brazilian Football Confederation) Fluminense
20	FW	**Malcom**	26 February 1997 (aged 17)	(Brazilian Football Confederation) Corinthians
21	MF	**Gerson**	20 July 1997 (aged 17)	(Brazilian Football Confederation) Fluminense
22	GK	Lucas Perri	10 December 1997 (aged 17)	(Brazilian Football Confederation) São Paulo
23	FW	Yuri Mamute	7 May 1995 (aged 19)	(Brazilian Football Confederation) Botafogo

== Chile ==
Coach: Hugo Tocalli (Argentina)

No.	Pos.	Player	Date of birth (age)	Club
1	GK	Miguel Vargas	15 June 1996 (aged 18)	(Football Federation of Chile) Universidad Católica
2	DF	Brayan Véjar	14 July 1995 (aged 19)	(Football Federation of Chile) Huachipato
3	DF	**Sebastián Vegas**	4 December 1996 (aged 18)	(Football Federation of Chile) Audax Italiano
4	DF	Brian Torrealba	14 July 1997 (aged 17)	(Football Federation of Chile) O'Higgins
5	DF	Bernardo Cerezo	21 January 1995 (aged 19)	(Football Federation of Chile) Universidad de Chile
6	MF	**Pablo Galdames**	30 December 1996 (aged 18)	(Football Federation of Chile) Unión Española
7	MF	**Luciano Cabral**	26 April 1995 (aged 19)	(Argentine Football Association) Argentinos Juniors
8	DF	Camilo Rodríguez	4 March 1995 (aged 19)	(Football Federation of Chile) Colo-Colo
9	FW	**Ignacio Jeraldino**	6 December 1995 (aged 19)	(Italian Football Federation) Parma Primavera
10	MF	Diego Rojas	15 February 1995 (aged 19)	(Football Federation of Chile) Universidad Católica
11	DF	Luis Pavez	17 September 1995 (aged 19)	(Football Federation of Chile) Colo-Colo
12	GK	**Brayan Cortés**	11 March 1995 (aged 19)	(Football Federation of Chile) Deportes Iquique
13	DF	Raúl Osorio	29 June 1995 (aged 19)	(Football Federation of Chile) O'Higgins
14	MF	**Marcos Bolados**	28 February 1996 (aged 18)	(Football Federation of Chile) Deportes Antofagasta
15	MF	**Cristián Cuevas**	2 April 1995 (aged 19)	(Football Federation of Chile) Universidad de Chile
16	MF	Juan Fuentes	21 March 1995 (aged 19)	(Football Federation of Chile) O'Higgins
17	FW	Matías Ramírez	5 February 1996 (aged 18)	(Royal Spanish Football Federation) Granada B
18	FW	Iván Pardo	10 November 1995 (aged 19)	(Football Federation of Chile) O'Higgins
19	MF	Sebastián Díaz	23 February 1996 (aged 18)	(Football Federation of Chile) Deportes Temuco
20	DF	**Rodrigo Echeverría**	1 April 1995 (aged 19)	(Football Federation of Chile) Universidad de Chile
21	MF	Bryan Carvallo	15 September 1996 (aged 18)	(Football Federation of Chile) Colo-Colo
22	GK	Nelson Espinoza	22 September 1995 (aged 19)	(Football Federation of Chile) Universidad de Chile
23	FW	José Luis Sierra	24 June 1997 (aged 17)	(Football Federation of Chile) Unión Española

== Colombia ==
Coach: Carlos Restrepo (Colombia)

No.	Pos.	Player	Date of birth (age)	Club
1	GK	**Álvaro Montero**	29 March 1995 (aged 19)	(Brazilian Football Confederation) São Caetano
2	DF	Aldayr Hernández	4 August 1995 (aged 19)	(Colombian Football Federation) Bogotá
3	DF	Jeison Angulo	27 June 1996 (aged 18)	(Colombian Football Federation) Deportivo Cali
4	DF	Daniel Londoño	1 January 1995 (aged 20)	(Colombian Football Federation) Envigado
5	DF	Juan Sebastián Quintero	23 March 1995 (aged 19)	(Colombian Football Federation) Deportivo Cali
6	MF	Andrés Tello	6 September 1996 (aged 18)	(Italian Football Federation) Juventus
7	MF	Deinner Quiñones	16 August 1995 (aged 19)	(Colombian Football Federation) Deportes Quindío
8	MF	Alexis Zapata	10 May 1995 (aged 19)	(Italian Football Federation) Udinese
9	MF	Joao Rodríguez	19 May 1996 (aged 18)	(French Football Federation) Bastia
10	MF	Brayan Rovira	2 December 1996 (aged 18)	(Colombian Football Federation) Atlético Nacional
11	FW	Jeison Lucumí	8 April 1995 (aged 19)	(Colombian Football Federation) América
12	GK	Luis Erney Vásquez	1 March 1996 (aged 18)	(Colombian Football Federation) Independiente Medellín
13	DF	**Davinson Sánchez**	12 June 1996 (aged 18)	(Colombian Football Federation) Atlético Nacional
14	DF	Nilson Castrillón	28 January 1996 (aged 18)	(Colombian Football Federation) Deportivo Cali
15	MF	Luis Ángel Díaz	11 January 1995 (aged 19)	(Colombian Football Federation) Bogotá
16	MF	Jarlan Barrera	16 September 1995 (aged 19)	(Colombian Football Federation) Atlético Junior
17	MF	Juan Ferney Otero	26 May 1995 (aged 19)	(Colombian Football Federation) Fortaleza
18	FW	Mauro Manotas	15 July 1995 (aged 19)	(Colombian Football Federation) Uniautónoma
19	FW	**Alfredo Morelos**	21 June 1996 (aged 18)	(Colombian Football Federation) Independiente Medellín
20	FW	**Rafael Santos Borré**	15 September 1995 (aged 19)	(Colombian Football Federation) Deportivo Cali
21	DF	**Luis Manuel Orejuela**	20 August 1995 (aged 19)	(Colombian Football Federation) Deportivo Cali
22	GK	Yasser Chávez	5 March 1995 (aged 19)	(Colombian Football Federation) Bogotá
23	DF	Eduar Caicedo	23 April 1995 (aged 19)	(Colombian Football Federation) Deportivo Cali

== Ecuador ==
Coach: Sixto Vizuete (Ecuador)

No.	Pos.	Player	Date of birth (age)	Club
1	GK	Édisson Recalde	16 January 1996 (aged 18)	(Ecuadorian Football Federation) Imbabura
2	DF	Gabriel Corozo	5 January 1995 (aged 19)	(Royal Spanish Football Federation) Granada B
3	DF	Ronny Santos	4 July 1995 (aged 19)	(Ecuadorian Football Federation) Manta
4	DF	Darwin Suárez	17 January 1995 (aged 19)	(Mexican Football Federation) Pachuca
5	MF	**Jefferson Intriago**	4 June 1996 (aged 18)	(Ecuadorian Football Federation) LDU Quito
6	DF	**Aníbal Chalá**	9 May 1996 (aged 18)	(Ecuadorian Football Federation) El Nacional
7	FW	David Vélez	21 April 1995 (aged 19)	(Argentine Football Association) Vélez Sarsfield
8	MF	**José Francisco Cevallos**	18 January 1995 (aged 19)	(Ecuadorian Football Federation) LDU Quito
9	FW	Miguel Parrales	26 December 1995 (aged 19)	(Ecuadorian Football Federation) El Nacional
10	FW	**Gabriel Cortez**	10 October 1995 (aged 19)	(Ecuadorian Football Federation) Independiente del Valle
11	MF	Kevin Mercado	28 January 1995 (aged 19)	(Royal Spanish Football Federation) Granada B
12	GK	Xavier Cevallos	22 June 1996 (aged 18)	(Ecuadorian Football Federation) Emelec
13	FW	Gregoris Ortiz	10 December 1995 (aged 19)	(Ecuadorian Football Federation) LDU Loja
14	DF	Édison Realpe	13 April 1996 (aged 18)	(Ecuadorian Football Federation) River Plate
15	DF	Jerry León	22 April 1995 (aged 19)	(Ecuadorian Football Federation) Deportivo Cuenca
16	DF	Fabiano Tello	28 October 1998 (aged 16)	(Ecuadorian Football Federation) Independiente del Valle
17	MF	**Jhegson Méndez**	26 April 1997 (aged 17)	(Ecuadorian Football Federation) Independiente del Valle
18	MF	Boris Quiroz	18 April 1995 (aged 19)	(Ecuadorian Football Federation) Deportivo Quevedo
19	MF	Ronaldo Johnson	15 April 1995 (aged 19)	(Ecuadorian Football Federation) Deportivo Cuenca
20	MF	Robert Burbano	10 April 1995 (aged 19)	(Ecuadorian Football Federation) Emelec
21	FW	Jonathan Betancourt	14 February 1995 (aged 19)	(Portuguese Football Federation) Gondomar
22	GK	Gonzalo Valle	28 February 1996 (aged 18)	(Ecuadorian Football Federation) River Plate
23	DF	**Luis Cangá**	15 June 1995 (aged 19)	(Ecuadorian Football Federation) LDU Quito

== Paraguay ==
Coach: Víctor Genes (Paraguay)

No.	Pos.	Player	Date of birth (age)	Club
1	GK	Tomás Echagüe	18 September 1996 (aged 18)	(Paraguayan Football Association) Sportivo Luqueño
2	DF	**Juan Escobar**	3 July 1995 (aged 19)	(Paraguayan Football Association) Sportivo Luqueño
3	DF	Iván Cañete	22 April 1995 (aged 19)	(Royal Spanish Football Federation) Atlético Madrid C
4	DF	Ariel Benítez	15 September 1997 (aged 17)	(Paraguayan Football Association) Guaraní
5	DF	**Saúl Salcedo**	29 August 1997 (aged 17)	(Paraguayan Football Association) Olimpia
6	MF	Ángel Benítez	27 January 1996 (aged 18)	(Paraguayan Football Association) Libertad
7	MF	Danilo Santacruz	12 June 1995 (aged 19)	(Paraguayan Football Association) Libertad
8	MF	Gustavo Viera	28 August 1995 (aged 19)	(Brazilian Football Confederation) Corinthians
9	FW	**Luis Amarilla**	25 August 1995 (aged 19)	(Paraguayan Football Association) Libertad
10	FW	**Antonio Sanabria**	4 April 1996 (aged 18)	(Italian Football Federation) Roma
11	FW	**Sergio Díaz**	5 March 1998 (aged 16)	(Paraguayan Football Association) Cerro Porteño
12	GK	José Colmán	4 June 1996 (aged 18)	(Paraguayan Football Association) 3 de Febrero
13	DF	**Omar Alderete**	26 December 1996 (aged 18)	(Paraguayan Football Association) Cerro Porteño
14	DF	José Sanabria	25 March 1996 (aged 18)	(Paraguayan Football Association) Libertad
15	DF	Marcos González	15 July 1995 (aged 19)	(Paraguayan Football Association) Olimpia
16	MF	Ariel Guachire	5 May 1995 (aged 19)	(Paraguayan Football Association) Libertad
17	MF	**Jesús Medina**	30 April 1997 (aged 17)	(Paraguayan Football Association) Libertad
18	MF	Enrique Araújo	3 October 1995 (aged 19)	(Paraguayan Football Association) Nacional
19	FW	Walter González	21 May 1995 (aged 19)	(Paraguayan Football Association) Olimpia
20	MF	Jeremías Bogado	4 July 1995 (aged 19)	(Paraguayan Football Association) Olimpia
21	MF	Walter Araújo	5 September 1995 (aged 19)	(Paraguayan Football Association) Sol de América
22	GK	Miguel Mereles	6 April 1996 (aged 18)	(Paraguayan Football Association) Libertad
23	FW	Brahian Ayala	29 June 1995 (aged 19)	(Paraguayan Football Association) Rubio Ñu

== Peru ==
Coach: Víctor Rivera (Peru)

No.	Pos.	Player	Date of birth (age)	Club
1	GK	Carlos Grados	15 May 1995 (aged 19)	(Peruvian Football Federation) Sporting Cristal
2	DF	**Luis Abram**	27 February 1996 (aged 18)	(Peruvian Football Federation) Sporting Cristal
3	DF	Brian Bernaola	17 January 1995 (aged 19)	(Peruvian Football Federation) Sporting Cristal
4	DF	Aldair Ramos	12 August 1995 (aged 19)	(Peruvian Football Federation) Alianza Lima
5	DF	Francisco Duclós	29 January 1996 (aged 18)	(Royal Spanish Football Federation) Celta Vigo B
6	DF	Alexis Cossio	11 February 1995 (aged 19)	(Peruvian Football Federation) Sporting Cristal
7	DF	Fernando Canales	13 April 1995 (aged 19)	(Peruvian Football Federation) Alianza Lima
8	MF	**Renzo Garcés**	12 June 1996 (aged 18)	(Peruvian Football Federation) Universidad San Martín
9	FW	**Alexander Succar**	12 August 1995 (aged 19)	(Peruvian Football Federation) Sporting Cristal
10	MF	**Sergio Peña**	28 September 1995 (aged 19)	(Royal Spanish Football Federation) Granada B
11	FW	Aurelio Gonzales-Vigil	1 March 1996 (aged 18)	(Peruvian Football Federation) Melgar
12	GK	Daniel Prieto	19 September 1995 (aged 19)	(Peruvian Football Federation) Alianza Lima
13	DF	Diego Zurek	25 May 1996 (aged 18)	(Peruvian Football Federation) Universidad San Martín
14	MF	**Pedro Aquino**	13 April 1995 (aged 19)	(Peruvian Football Federation) Sporting Cristal
15	DF	Jeremy Rostaing	3 May 1995 (aged 19)	(Peruvian Football Federation) Universidad César Vallejo
16	DF	Aldair Perleche	4 June 1995 (aged 19)	(Peruvian Football Federation) Juan Aurich
17	FW	**Beto da Silva**	28 December 1996 (aged 18)	(Peruvian Football Federation) Sporting Cristal
18	DF	Andy Reátegui	14 June 1995 (aged 19)	(Peruvian Football Federation) Universitario de Deportes
19	FW	**Adrián Ugarriza**	1 January 1997 (aged 18)	(Peruvian Football Federation) Universidad San Martín
20	MF	Enmanuel Páucar	9 August 1996 (aged 18)	(Peruvian Football Federation) Universitario de Deportes
21	GK	Karlo Sánchez	21 March 1995 (aged 19)	(Peruvian Football Federation) Unión Huaral
22	MF	Miguel Carranza	3 November 1995 (aged 19)	(Peruvian Football Federation) Unión Comercio
23	FW	Roberto Siucho	7 February 1997 (aged 17)	(Peruvian Football Federation) Universitario de Deportes

== Uruguay ==
Coach: Fabián Coito (Uruguay)

No.	Pos.	Player	Date of birth (age)	Club
1	GK	Thiago Cardozo	31 July 1996 (aged 18)	(Uruguayan Football Association) Peñarol
2	DF	Agustín Ale	19 February 1995 (aged 19)	(Uruguayan Football Association) River Plate
3	DF	Matías Toma	14 February 1995 (aged 19)	(Uruguayan Football Association) Liverpool
4	DF	**Mauricio Lemos**	28 December 1995 (aged 19)	(Uruguayan Football Association) Defensor Sporting
5	MF	**Nahitan Nández**	28 December 1995 (aged 19)	(Uruguayan Football Association) Peñarol
6	MF	Ramiro Guerra	21 March 1997 (aged 17)	(Royal Spanish Football Federation) Villarreal B
7	MF	Facundo Castro	22 January 1995 (aged 19)	(Uruguayan Football Association) Defensor Sporting
8	MF	**Mauro Arambarri**	30 September 1995 (aged 19)	(Uruguayan Football Association) Defensor Sporting
9	FW	Jaime Báez	25 April 1995 (aged 19)	(Uruguayan Football Association) Juventud
10	MF	**Gastón Pereiro**	11 June 1995 (aged 19)	(Uruguayan Football Association) Nacional
11	FW	Franco Acosta	5 March 1996 (aged 18)	(Uruguayan Football Association) Fénix
12	GK	Gastón Guruceaga	15 March 1995 (aged 19)	(Uruguayan Football Association) Peñarol
13	MF	Facundo Boné	16 November 1995 (aged 19)	(Uruguayan Football Association) Fénix
14	FW	Diego Fagúndez	14 February 1995 (aged 19)	(United States Soccer Federation) New England Revolution
15	MF	Gastón Faber	21 April 1996 (aged 18)	(Uruguayan Football Association) Danubio
16	DF	José Etcheverry	10 May 1996 (aged 18)	(Uruguayan Football Association) Defensor Sporting
17	FW	Horacio Sequeira	30 September 1995 (aged 19)	(Uruguayan Football Association) Danubio
18	MF	Franco Pizzichillo	3 January 1996 (aged 18)	(Uruguayan Football Association) Defensor Sporting
19	DF	Erick Cabaco	19 April 1995 (aged 19)	(Uruguayan Football Association) Rentistas
20	MF	Rodrigo Amaral	25 March 1997 (aged 17)	(Uruguayan Football Association) Nacional
21	DF	Guillermo Cotugno	12 March 1995 (aged 19)	(Uruguayan Football Association) Danubio
22	DF	**Mathías Suárez**	24 June 1996 (aged 18)	(Uruguayan Football Association) Defensor Sporting
23	GK	Michel Tabárez	29 July 1995 (aged 19)	(Uruguayan Football Association) Fénix

== Venezuela ==
Coach: Miguel Echenausi (Venezuela)

No.	Pos.	Player	Date of birth (age)	Club
1	GK	Kleiner Escorcia	11 July 1995 (aged 19)	(Venezuelan Football Federation) Deportivo Petare
2	DF	Junior Mejía	22 February 1995 (aged 19)	(Venezuelan Football Federation) Yaracuyanos
3	DF	**Carlos Cermeño**	9 August 1995 (aged 19)	(Venezuelan Football Federation) Deportivo Táchira
4	DF	José Marrufo	12 May 1996 (aged 18)	(Venezuelan Football Federation) Deportivo Lara
5	MF	Oscar Guillén	17 May 1995 (aged 19)	(Venezuelan Football Federation) Estudiantes de Mérida
6	DF	Franko Díaz	6 February 1996 (aged 18)	(Venezuelan Football Federation) Llaneros
7	FW	**Jhon Murillo**	21 November 1995 (aged 19)	(Venezuelan Football Federation) Zamora
8	MF	Carlos José Sosa	2 August 1995 (aged 19)	(Venezuelan Football Federation) Trujillanos
9	FW	**Andrés Ponce**	11 November 1996 (aged 18)	(Venezuelan Football Federation) Llaneros
10	MF	**Jefferson Savarino**	11 November 1996 (aged 18)	(Venezuelan Football Federation) Zulia
11	FW	Juan Carlos Azócar	1 October 1995 (aged 19)	(Venezuelan Football Federation) Deportivo Táchira
12	GK	Beycker Velázquez	13 April 1996 (aged 18)	(Venezuelan Football Federation) Caracas
13	DF	**Jefre Vargas**	12 January 1995 (aged 19)	(Venezuelan Football Federation) Caracas
14	DF	Rubén Ramírez	18 October 1995 (aged 19)	(Venezuelan Football Federation) Estudiantes de Caracas
15	DF	**Daniel Carrillo**	2 December 1995 (aged 19)	(Venezuelan Football Federation) Deportivo Lara
16	MF	Luis Jiménez	28 December 1995 (aged 19)	(Venezuelan Football Federation) Carabobo
17	FW	Yanowski Reyes	15 May 1995 (aged 19)	(Venezuelan Football Federation) Llaneros
18	FW	**Adalberto Peñaranda**	21 May 1997 (aged 17)	(Venezuelan Football Federation) Deportivo La Guaira
19	MF	Ayrton Páez	16 January 1995 (aged 19)	(Royal Spanish Football Federation) Mallorca B
20	FW	Kenny Romero	17 May 1995 (aged 19)	(Venezuelan Football Federation) Aragua
21	DF	Jhonny Alberto González	15 September 1995 (aged 19)	(Venezuelan Football Federation) Atlético Venezuela
22	GK	Andrés Colmenares	1 November 1997 (aged 17)	(Venezuelan Football Federation) Deportivo Táchira
23	FW	Jaime Moreno^{[1]}	30 March 1995 (aged 19)	(Cyprus Football Association) AEL Limassol

^{1} Capped for Nicaragua.
