= Bernaola =

Bernaola is a Spanish surname. Notable people with the surname include:

- Brian Bernaola (born 1995), Peruvian footballer
- Carmelo Bernaola (1929–2002), Spanish composer and clarinetist
