= Miguel Vargas =

Miguel Vargas may refer to:

- Miguel Vargas (politician) (born 1950), Dominican politician
- Miguel Vargas (runner) (born 1957), Costa Rican long-distance runner
- Miguel Vargas (footballer, born 1969), Chilean football midfielder
- Miguel Vargas (footballer, born 1978), Portuguese winger
- Miguel Vargas (footballer, born 1996), Chilean-Peruvian goalkeeper
- Miguel Vargas (baseball) (born 1999), Cuban baseball player
