= Giovanni Simeone =

Argentine footballer (born 1995)

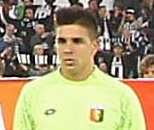
- Simeone with Genoa in 2017

Personal information
- Full name: Giovanni Pablo Simeone Baldini
- Date of birth: 5 July 1995 (age 31)
- Place of birth: Buenos Aires, Argentina
- Height: 1.81 m (5 ft 11 in)
- Position: Striker

Team information
- Current team: Torino
- Number: 18

Youth career
- –2008: Rayo Majadahonda
- 2008–2013: River Plate

Senior career*
Years	Team	Apps	(Gls)
2013–2016	River Plate	27	(2)
2015–2016	→ Banfield (loan)	34	(12)
2016–2017	Genoa	35	(12)
2017–2020	Fiorentina	74	(20)
2019–2020	→ Cagliari (loan)	37	(12)
2020–2022	Cagliari	34	(6)
2021–2022	→ Hellas Verona (loan)	35	(17)
2022–2023	Hellas Verona	0	(0)
2022–2023	→ Napoli (loan)	25	(4)
2023–2026	Napoli	58	(2)
2025–2026	→ Torino (loan)	32	(11)
2026–	Torino	7	(2)

International career
2015	Argentina U20	12	(10)
2016	Argentina Olympic	3	(0)
2018–2023	Argentina	6	(1)
Medal record
Men's football
Representing Argentina
South American U-20 Championship
Winner	2015 Uruguay
- * Club domestic league appearances and goals as of 21:45, 19 October 2026 (UTC)

Giovanni Pablo Simeone Baldini (Spanish pronunciation: [ɟʝoˈβani simeˈone]; Italian: [dʒoˈvanni simeˈoːne]; born 5 July 1995), is an Argentine professional footballer who plays as a striker for Serie A club Torino. Nicknamed "El Cholito", he is the son of manager and former player Diego Simeone.

== Early life ==
The son of former Argentine international footballer Diego Simeone and Carolina Baldini, Giovanni Simeone was born in Buenos Aires, Argentina, while his father was playing for Atlético Madrid.

His family moved to Italy in 1997, but later returned to Spain in 2003 following Diego's career club changes. Two years later he moved to Argentina, and joined River Plate's youth setup in 2008 when his father was appointed coach of the first team. He has two younger brothers, Gianluca and Giuliano, both footballers.

== Club career ==
=== Early career in Argentina ===
After progressing through the youth ranks, Simeone signed a three-year professional deal with River in November 2011. In July 2013, he was called up by the main squad for the pre-season; Simeone made his league debut on 4 August 2013, starting and playing the full 90 minutes in a 1–0 away defeat against Gimnasia La Plata. Later that month, he renewed his contract, signing until 2016. Simeone scored his first professional goal on 8 September, netting the second of a 3–0 home victory against Tigre.

On 6 July 2015, Simeone joined fellow Argentine Primera División side Banfield on a season-long loan. On 12 July 2015, he scored the match-winning goal on his debut in a 1–0 victory against Quilmes.

=== Genoa ===
On 18 August 2016, Simeone signed for Italian club Genoa for €3 million. He scored his first goal as a starter in a 1–1 draw against Pescara on 25 September 2016. On 27 November, Simeone netted a brace in a 3–1 victory against Juventus.

=== Fiorentina ===
Amid speculation of Atlético Madrid's interest in the then-youngster to be coached by his father Diego Simeone, Giovanni signed with Serie A club Fiorentina on 16 August 2017 for an undisclosed fee. On 29 April 2018, Simeone scored his first hat-trick in Fiorentina's 3–0 league victory against Napoli, effectively ending his future club's title hopes.

=== Cagliari ===
On 30 August 2019, Simeone joined Cagliari on a year-long loan from Fiorentina, including an obligatory purchase clause at the end of the period. On 1 September, he made his debut in a 2–1 defeat against Inter Milan. Simeone scored his first goal on 15 September in a 3–1 victory against Parma. After an inconsistent first part of the season, he scored in four consecutive games upon returning from the COVID-19 lockdown and finished the seasons with 12 goals overall.

The following season, Simeone scored a brace in a 3–2 victory against Torino. He ended the 2020–21 season with six goals scored.

=== Hellas Verona ===
On 26 August 2021, Simeone joined Serie A club Hellas Verona on a season-long loan with an option to buy. On 24 October, he scored all four goals in a 4–1 victory against Lazio. It was his second hat-trick in Serie A, and both came against clubs managed by Maurizio Sarri. On 30 October, Simeone netted two goals against Juventus for the second time in his career, as Verona won 2–1.

On 17 June 2022, he joined Hellas Verona on a permanent deal with a contract lasting until 2026.

=== Napoli ===
On 18 August 2022, Simeone signed for Napoli on loan with an option to buy, which became obligatory upon meeting certain sporting conditions. He made his debut for the club on 28 August against Fiorentina, his former team, replacing Victor Osimhen in the final 15 minutes of the match, which ended in a goalless draw.

On 7 September, Simeone made his UEFA Champions League debut, once again replacing Osimhen, and scored his first goal both in the competition and for his new club, contributing to Napoli's 4–1 victory against Liverpool. On 18 September, he scored his first league goal for Napoli in a 2–1 victory against AC Milan at the San Siro. Simeone then recorded his first brace for the club on 26 October, in a 3–0 Champions League home win against Rangers, thereby becoming the second Argentine player after his father to score four goals in his first four matches in Europe's top competition.

On 17 January 2023, in his Coppa Italia debut with the club, Simeone scored Napoli's second goal in their home match against Cremonese. However, his club was eliminated following a defeat on penalties, with the match having ended 2–2 after extra time. He went on to score the decisive goal in Napoli's 2–1 home victory against Roma on 29 January. On 4 May, Napoli secured their first league title in 34 years following a 1–1 draw against Udinese, which was also the first league title Simeone won in his professional career.

On 15 June 2023, Simeone signed a permanent contract with Napoli, valid until 2026, with an option to extend until 2027.

=== Torino ===
On 7 August 2025, Simeone joined fellow Serie A club Torino on a season-long loan with a conditional obligation to buy. He signed a contract with Torino until 2028 that would be in effect if the conditions in the loan agreement are fulfilled. A month later, on 14 September, he scored his first goal for the club in a 1–0 away victory over Roma.

The obligation to buy was triggered on 7 February 2026 after his appearance against Fiorentina, making the transfer permanent for a reported €5.5 million plus up to €1 million in bonuses. He concluded his debut season with Torino as the club's top scorer, scoring 11 goals in 35 appearances across all competitions.

== International career ==
=== Under-20 team ===
==== U-20 South American Championship ====
Giovanni Simeone was initially a part of the Argentine Under-18 team. His outstanding performances earned him a call-up in the U-20 team when he was just 17 years old. In March 2014, Simeone was called up by manager Alejandro Sabella to train with the senior Argentina national team as a 'sparring' partner.

On 6 January 2015, the technical director of the Argentine U-20 football team, Humberto Grondona, released a list of 32 players for pre-tournament training. Giovanni Simeone was among those called up for the upcoming U-20 South American Championship, which was scheduled to be held in Uruguay. On 10 January, just days before the championship was set to begin, Grondona finalized the list of 23 players, which included Simeone. Out of the seven River Plate players initially listed, six made it to the final squad traveling to Uruguay.

On 14 January, the Argentine U-20 national team made their debut in the U-20 South American Championship against Ecuador. It was a resounding 5–2 victory, with Simeone emerging as the top scorer of the match. He scored his first goal early in the game following a play by Ángel Correa. His second goal came after another assist from Correa, and Simeone simply had to tap it in.

On 16 January, in the second match of the tournament, the Argentine U-20 team suffered a setback with a 0–1 against Paraguay U-20, who temporarily took the lead in the group. Two days later, on 18 January, following the previous defeat, the Argentine U-20 team bounced back with a convincing 6–2 victory against the Peru U-20 team. Simeone was again the standout player, scoring twice. His first goal came from an assist by Sebastián Driussi, whilst his second came from a header after a cross by Leonardo Suárez.

On 22 January, in the last match of the Group A stage of the U-20 South American Championship, the Argentine U-20 team won 3–0 against Bolivia U-20. Simeone was the top scorer again, netting two goals, both of which came from assists by Leonardo Suárez.

On 7 February 2015, the Argentine U-20 team won the U-20 South American Championship after defeating hosts Uruguay 2–1. Simeone played a pivotal role in the team's success and finished as the tournament's top scorer with nine goals in ten games.

==== U-20 World Cup ====
On 6 March 2015, the coach of the U-20 national team, Humberto Grondona, included him in the preliminary squad for the U-20 World Cup to be held in New Zealand. Training and friendly matches would start at the end of March and continue throughout April until the final list of players travelling to the World Cup was announced in early May. On 13 May, Humberto Grondona confirmed the list of 21 players who represented the Argentine U-20 team at the World Cup in New Zealand, among them including Giovanni Simeone. The team travelled on Monday, 18 May, to Tahiti, where they played two friendly matches against the local team. The Argentine team also arrived in Wellington on 25 May to make their debut on 30 May against Panama. On 21 May, in the first friendly match played before the New Zealand World Cup, the Argentine U-20 team lost in Tahiti 3–1 to the country's senior team in a match played at the Pater Te Hono Nui Stadium. On 24 May the team played their second friendly, and final one before traveling to New Zealand for the World Cup, against Tahiti. This time, the Albiceleste won 4–1, with goals from Ángel Correa, Monteseirín, Simeone, and Emiliano Buendía, showing good ball control and attacking potency.

=== Senior team ===
Simeone was called up to the senior national team for the first time for the FIFA double date in September 2018. On 8 September 2018, he made his debut as a starter against Guatemala whilst scoring his first goal, leading to a 3–0 victory for Argentina against the Central Americans. Against the second opponent, Colombia, Simeone was a substitute but came on in the 88th minute to replace Nicolás Tagliafico, where he had a tough clash with Colombian goalkeeper David Ospina. As part of a generational change, Simeone continued to be called up by interim coach Lionel Scaloni, becoming a regular player in the Albiceleste's subsequent matches. The following month, Simeone was again included in the squad to play the October friendly matches against Iraq and Brazil, coming on as a substitute in both matches, replacing Lautaro Martínez against Iraq and Mauro Icardi against Brazil. In November, Simeone was called up to play in the Argentina's final match of the year, facing Mexico in a home friendly match. He provided an assist to Paulo Dybala, which ended in a 2–0 victory for the Argentines.

In September 2020, Simeone was once again called up by Lionel Scaloni for the World Cup qualifying double date against Ecuador and Bolivia.

== Style of play ==
Naturally rangy, almost waif-like in his six-foot build, Gio has worked incessantly to build himself up and avoid being bundled off the ball, a fate that blighted him all too often while still learning his trade in Argentina.

Simeone plays primarily as a forward. He has been deployed in various attacking roles, including as a main striker and as a second striker. He is right-footed, but has scored goals with both feet, and was known for his composure in front of goal in his prime.

A tenacious and energetic player, he is known for his work-rate and defensive contribution off the ball, and often presses opponents in order to help his team win back possession. He is also effective in the air, courtesy of his heading ability. He is also known for his speed and attacking movement, which enables him to create space, and provide depth for his team; his speed coupled with his solid technique and physicality also enables him to carry the ball or hold it up with his back to goal.

In his youth, he was considered to be a promising player in the media.

== Personal life ==
On 1 January 2014, at the age of 18, Simeone obtained Spanish citizenship. On 25 May 2022, he married Italian model Giulia Coppini in the church of San Salvatore al Monte (Florence).

== Career statistics ==
=== Club ===
As of match played 19 October 2026

Appearances and goals by club, season and competition
Club	Season	League			National cup (Note: Includes Copa Argentina, Coppa Italia)		Continental		Other		Total	
Club	Season	Division	Apps	Goals	Apps	Goals	Apps	Goals	Apps	Goals	Apps	Goals
River Plate	2013–14	Argentine Primera División	17	2	2	0	0	0	0	0	19	2
River Plate	2014	Argentine Primera División	7	0	0	0	4 (Note: Appearances in Copa Sudamericana)	2	0	0	11	2
River Plate	2015	Argentine Primera División	3	0	0	0	0	0	0	0	3	0
River Plate	Total		27	2	2	0	4	2	0	0	33	4
Banfield (loan)	2015	Argentine Primera División	18	7	1	0	—		0	0	19	7
Banfield (loan)	2016	Argentine Primera División	16	5	1	0	0	0	—		17	5
Banfield (loan)	Total		34	12	2	0	0	0	0	0	36	12
Genoa	2016–17	Serie A	35	12	1	1	—		—		36	13
Genoa	2017–18	Serie A	0	0	1	1	—		—		1	1
Genoa	Total		35	12	2	2	0	0	0	0	37	14
Fiorentina	2017–18	Serie A	38	14	2	0	—		—		40	14
Fiorentina	2018–19	Serie A	36	6	4	2	—		—		40	8
Fiorentina	Total		74	20	6	2	0	0	0	0	80	22
Cagliari (loan)	2019–20	Serie A	37	12	0	0	—		—		37	12
Cagliari	2020–21	Serie A	33	6	0	0	—		—		33	6
Cagliari	2021–22	Serie A	1	0	1	0	—		—		2	0
Cagliari	Cagliari total		71	18	1	0	0	0	0	0	72	18
Hellas Verona (loan)	2021–22	Serie A	35	17	0	0	—		—		35	17
Napoli (loan)	2022–23	Serie A	25	4	1	1	7 (Note: Appearances in UEFA Champions League)	4	—		33	9
Napoli	2023–24	Serie A	28	1	1	0	6	1	2 (Note: Appearances in Supercoppa Italiana)	1	37	3
Napoli	2024–25	Serie A	30	1	3	1	—		—		33	2
Napoli	Napoli total		83	6	5	2	13	5	2	1	103	14
Torino (loan)	2025–26	Serie A	32	11	3	0	—		—		35	11
Torino	2026–27	Serie A	7	2	2	1	—		—		9	3
Torino	Torino total		39	13	5	1	0	0	0	0	44	14
Career total			397	100	23	7	17	7	2	1	439	115

=== International ===
Appearances and goals by national team and year
National team	Year	Apps	Goals
Argentina	2018	5	1
Argentina	2019	0	0
Argentina	2020	0	0
Argentina	2021	0	0
Argentina	2022	0	0
Argentina	2023	1	0
Total		6	1

Scores and results list Argentina's goal tally first, score column indicates score after each Simeone goal.

List of international goals scored by Giovanni Simeone
No.	Date	Venue	Opponent	Score	Result	Competition	Ref.
1	7 September 2018	Los Angeles Memorial Coliseum, Los Angeles, United States	Guatemala	3–0	3–0	Friendly	

== Honours ==
River Plate

- Argentine Primera División: 2014 Final
- Copa Campeonato: 2014
- Copa Sudamericana: 2014

Napoli

- Serie A: 2022–23, 2024–25

Argentina U20

- South American Youth Football Championship: 2015

Individual

- South American Youth Football Championship Top Goalscorer: 2015
- Serie A Player of the Month: October 2021
