= Gustavo Viera =

Gustavo Viera may refer to:

- Gustavo Viera (Paraguayan footballer) (born 1995), Paraguayan football midfielder
- Gustavo Viera (Uruguayan footballer) (born 2000), Uruguayan football forward
