= 2015 South American U-20 Championship =

2015 South American Youth Football Championship
Campeonato Sudamericano Sub-20 "Juventud de America" Uruguay 2015

Tournament details
- Host country: Uruguay
- Dates: 14 January – 7 February
- Teams: 10 (from 1 confederation)
- Venues: 4 (in 3 host cities)

Final positions
- Champions: Argentina (5th title)
- Runners-up: Colombia
- Third place: Uruguay
- Fourth place: Brazil

Tournament statistics
- Matches played: 35
- Goals scored: 99 (2.83 per match)
- Top scorer(s): (Argentina) Giovanni Simeone (9 goals)

The 2015 South American Youth Football Championship (Spanish: Campeonato Sudamericano Sub-20 "Juventud de América" Uruguay 2015, Brazilian Portuguese: Campeonato Sulamericano Sub-20 "Juventude da América" Uruguai 2015) was the 27th edition of the biennial international youth football tournament organized by CONMEBOL for the men's under-20 national teams of South America. It was held in Uruguay from 14 January to 7 February 2015.

The tournament served as qualifier for several competitions. The top four teams qualified for the 2015 FIFA U-20 World Cup in New Zealand as the CONMEBOL representatives. Brazil, as hosts, and the champion team qualified directly for the 2016 Summer Olympics men's football tournament while the runner-up team advanced to a play-off against a CONCACAF team for the final berth in the Olympics. Finally, the four teams ranked third to sixth qualified for the 2015 Pan American Games men's football tournament in Canada.

Argentina won their fifth title. defending champions Colombia finished second, Uruguay finished third, while Brazil finished fourth.

== Teams ==
All ten CONMEBOL member national teams entered the tournament.

Team	Appearance	Previous best performance
Argentina	25th	Champions (4 times, most recent 2003)
Bolivia	22nd	Fourth place (2 times, most recent 1983)
Brazil	26th	Champions (11 times, most recent 2011)
Chile	27th	Runners-up (1 time, 1975)
Colombia (holders)	25th	Champions (3 times, most recent 2013)
Ecuador	22nd	Third place (3 times, most recent 2011)
Paraguay	25th	Champions (1 time, 1971)
Peru	26th	Third place (2 times, most recent 1971)
Uruguay (hosts)	26th	Champions (7 times, most recent 1981)
Venezuela	23rd	Third place (1 time, most recent 1954)

== Venues ==
Uruguay was chosen as host country of the tournament on 23 May 2012 at the CONMEBOL Executive Committee meeting held in Budapest, Hungary, prior to the 62nd FIFA Congress. The matches were held in 4 venues in 3 host cities, Estadio Profesor Alberto Suppici, Colonia del Sacramento (group A) and Estadio Domingo Burgueño, Maldonado (group B) for the first stage while the final stage took place at Estadio Gran Parque Central and Estadio Centenario in Montevideo.

Colonia	Maldonado	2015 South American U-20 Championship is located in Uruguay
Estadio Profesor Alberto Suppici	Estadio Domingo Burgueño	2015 South American U-20 Championship is located in Uruguay
Capacity: 12,000	Capacity: 22,000	2015 South American U-20 Championship is located in Uruguay
Montevideo		2015 South American U-20 Championship is located in Uruguay
Estadio Gran Parque Central	Estadio Centenario	2015 South American U-20 Championship is located in Uruguay
Capacity: 28,000	Capacity: 65,235	2015 South American U-20 Championship is located in Uruguay

== Squads ==
Each team could register a squad of 23 players (three of whom had to be goalkeepers).

== Match officials ==
The referees and assistants referees were:

(Argentina) Mauro Vigliano

Assistant: Ezequiel Brailovsky

(Bolivia) Alejandro Mancilla

Assistant: Wilson Arellano

(Brazil) Ricardo Marques

Assistant: Kléber Lúcio Gil

(Chile) Julio Bascuñán

Assistant: Marcelo Barraza

(Colombia) Adrián Vélez

Assistant: Wilmar Navarro

(Ecuador) Roddy Zambrano

Assistant: Luis Vera

(Paraguay) Enrique Cáceres

Assistant: Milciades Saldívar

(Peru) Diego Haro

Assistant: Braulio Cornejo

(Uruguay) Andrés Cunha

Assistant: Nicolás Tarán

(Venezuela) José Argote

Assistant: Jairo Romero

== Draw ==
The draw was held on 29 September 2014, 20:15 UYT (UTC−3), at the Hipódromo Nacional de Maroñas in Montevideo. The ten teams were drawn into two groups of five. Argentina and Brazil were seeded into Group A and Group B respectively and assigned to position 1 in their group. Paraguay and Uruguay were also seeded into Group A and Group B respectively but assigned to position 2 within their group (As host, Uruguay decided to play in group B). The remaining teams were placed into "pairing pots" (Colombia–Ecuador, Chile–Peru, Bolivia–Venezuela) and drawn to determine their group as well as the position within it.

== First stage ==
The top three teams in each group qualified for the final stage.

When teams finished level of points, the final order was determined according to:

1. superior goal difference in all matches
2. greater number of goals scored in all group matches
3. better result in matches between the tied teams
4. drawing of lots

All match times are in local Uruguay Summer Time (UTC−02:00).

=== Group A ===
Pos	Team	Pld	W	D	L	GF	GA	GD	Pts	Group stage result
1	Argentina	4	3	0	1	14	5	+9	9	Advance to Final stage
2	Paraguay	4	2	1	1	7	5	+2	7	Advance to Final stage
3	Peru	4	2	1	1	6	7	−1	7	Advance to Final stage
4	Ecuador	4	2	0	2	9	8	+1	6	
5	Bolivia	4	0	0	4	2	13	−11	0	

Source: CONMEBOL
14 January 2015
20:00

Argentina	5–2	Ecuador
Simeone 5', 42'; Correa 20'; Martínez 32'; Monteseirín 39'	Report	J. Cevallos 22', 85' (pen.)

Estadio Suppici, Colonia
Referee: Ricardo Marques (Brazil)
14 January 2015
22:10

Paraguay	4–2	Bolivia
Viera 3'; Díaz 23'; E. Araújo 55'; Medina 90+1'	Report	Iragua 38'; A. Pinto 49'

Estadio Suppici, Colonia
Referee: Andrés Cunha (Uruguay)

16 January 2015
20:00

Argentina	0–1	Paraguay
	Report	Cañete 6'

Estadio Suppici, Colonia
Referee: Adrián Vélez (Colombia)
16 January 2015
22:10

Ecuador	0–2	Peru
	Report	Succar 46', 76'

Estadio Suppici, Colonia
Referee: Julio Bascuñán (Chile)

18 January 2015
20:00

Argentina	6–2	Peru
Prieto 23' (o.g.); Bernaola 28' (o.g.); Correa 32'; Simeone 41', 89'; Suárez 78'	Report	Gonzales-Vigil 73'; Da Silva 73'

Estadio Suppici, Colonia
Referee: Andrés Cunha (Uruguay)
18 January 2015
22:10

Ecuador	5–0	Bolivia
J. Cevallos 34', 40'; Burbano 50'; Parrales 87', 90+1'	Report

Estadio Suppici, Colonia
Referee: José Argote (Venezuela)

20 January 2015
20:00

Paraguay	1–2	Ecuador
Santacruz 68'	Report	Parrales 6'; Cangá 88'

Estadio Suppici, Colonia
Referee: Ricardo Marques (Brazil)
20 January 2015
22:10

Bolivia	0–1	Peru
	Report	Da Silva 68'

Estadio Suppici, Colonia
Referee: Adrián Vélez (Colombia)

22 January 2015
20:00

Argentina	3–0	Bolivia
Simeone 5', 12'; Cardozo 72'	Report

Estadio Suppici, Colonia
Referee: José Argote (Venezuela)
22 January 2015
22:10

Paraguay	1–1	Peru
Amarilla 29'	Report	Succar 23'

Estadio Suppici, Colonia
Referee: Julio Bascuñán (Chile)

=== Group B ===
Pos	Team	Pld	W	D	L	GF	GA	GD	Pts	Group stage result
1	Uruguay (H)	4	3	0	1	9	2	+7	9	Advance to Final stage
2	Brazil	4	3	0	1	6	4	+2	9	Advance to Final stage
3	Colombia	4	2	0	2	5	3	+2	6	Advance to Final stage
4	Venezuela	4	1	0	3	1	5	−4	3	
5	Chile	4	1	0	3	4	11	−7	3	

Source: CONMEBOL
(H) Hosts
15 January 2015
20:00

Brazil	2–1	Chile
Marcos Guilherme 42', 46'	Report	Cuevas 81'

Estadio Domingo Burgueño, Maldonado
Referee: Enrique Cáceres (Paraguay)
15 January 2015
22:10

Uruguay	1–0	Colombia
Arambarri 90+1'	Report

Estadio Domingo Burgueño, Maldonado
Referee: Mauro Vigliano (Argentina)

17 January 2015
20:00

Chile	2–0	Venezuela
Echeverría 6'; Cuevas 58'	Report

Estadio Domingo Burgueño, Maldonado
Referee: Diego Haro (Peru)
17 January 2015
22:10

Brazil	0–2	Uruguay
	Report	Pereiro 27'; Arambarri 59'

Estadio Domingo Burgueño, Maldonado
Referee: Roddy Zambrano (Ecuador)

19 January 2015
20:00

Chile	0–3	Colombia
	Report	Borré 12'; Lucumí 75'; Otero 81'

Estadio Domingo Burgueño, Maldonado
Referee: Enrique Cáceres (Paraguay)
19 January 2015
22:10

Brazil	2–0	Venezuela
Kenedy 72'; Gabriel Barbosa 78'	Report

Estadio Domingo Burgueño, Maldonado
Referee: Alejandro Mancilla (Bolivia)

21 January 2015
20:00

Colombia	1–0	Venezuela
Lucumí 60'	Report

Estadio Domingo Burgueño, Maldonado
Referee: Roddy Zambrano (Ecuador)
21 January 2015
22:10

Uruguay	6–1	Chile
Acosta 20', 45+1'; Echeverría 23' (o.g.); Pereiro 66'; Amaral 81'; Faber 88'	Report	Echeverría 85'

Estadio Domingo Burgueño, Maldonado
Referee: Mauro Vigliano (Argentina)

23 January 2015
20:00

Brazil	2–1	Colombia
Thalles 42'; Marcos Guilherme 75'	Report	Manotas 50'

Estadio Domingo Burgueño, Maldonado
Referee: Diego Haro (Peru)
23 January 2015
22:10

Uruguay	0–1	Venezuela
	Report	Moreno 27'

Estadio Domingo Burgueño, Maldonado
Referee: Alejandro Mancilla (Bolivia)

== Final stage ==
When teams finished level of points, the final order was determined according to the same criteria as the first stage, taking into account only matches in the final stage.

Pos	Team	Pld	W	D	L	GF	GA	GD	Pts	Qualification
1	Argentina	5	4	1	0	10	2	+8	13	2015 FIFA U-20 World Cup and 2016 Summer Olympics
2	Colombia	5	2	3	0	7	2	+5	9	2015 FIFA U-20 World Cup and Olympic play-off
3	Uruguay (H)	5	2	2	1	6	3	+3	8	2015 FIFA U-20 World Cup and 2015 Pan American Games
4	Brazil	5	2	1	2	7	5	+2	7	2015 FIFA U-20 World Cup, 2015 Pan American Games and 2016 Summer Olympics (Note: Brazil qualified for the 2016 Summer Olympics as hosts.)
5	Peru	5	1	0	4	5	14	−9	3	2015 Pan American Games
6	Paraguay	5	0	1	4	1	10	−9	1	2015 Pan American Games

Source: CONMEBOL
(H) Hosts
Notes:
26 January 2015
17:50

Argentina	2–0	Peru
Simeone 1'; Correa 77'	Report

Estadio Centenario, Montevideo
Referee: Enrique Cáceres (Paraguay)
26 January 2015
20:00

Paraguay	0–0	Colombia
	Report

Estadio Centenario, Montevideo
Referee: Andrés Cunha (Uruguay)
26 January 2015
22:10

Uruguay	0–0	Brazil
	Report

Estadio Centenario, Montevideo
Referee: Julio Bascuñán (Chile)

29 January 2015
17:50

Paraguay	0–2	Brazil
	Report	Yuri Mamute 65'; Marcos Guilherme 77'

Estadio Gran Parque Central, Montevideo
Referee: Diego Haro (Peru)
29 January 2015
20:00

Argentina	1–1	Colombia
Compagnucci 88'	Report	Barrera 50' (pen.)

Estadio Gran Parque Central, Montevideo
Referee: Roddy Zambrano (Ecuador)
29 January 2015
22:10

Uruguay	3–1	Peru
Acosta 27'; Pereiro 55'; Arambarri 77'	Report	Ugarriza 66'

Estadio Gran Parque Central, Montevideo
Referee: Mauro Vigliano (Argentina)

1 February 2015
17:50

Peru	1–3	Colombia
Succar 23'	Report	Lucumí 25', 90'; Borré 40'

Estadio Gran Parque Central, Montevideo
Referee: José Argote (Venezuela)
1 February 2015
20:00

Argentina	2–0	Brazil
M. Rolón 86'; Contreras 89'	Report

Estadio Gran Parque Central, Montevideo
Referee: Andrés Cunha (Uruguay)
1 February 2015
22:10

Uruguay	2–0	Paraguay
Acosta 21'; Pereiro 37'	Report

Estadio Gran Parque Central, Montevideo
Referee: Ricardo Marques (Brazil)

4 February 2015
17:50

Peru	0–5	Brazil
	Report	Nathan 47'; Thalles 56', 62'; Malcom 71'; Léo Pereira 81'

Estadio Centenario, Montevideo
Referee: Adrián Vélez (Colombia)
4 February 2015
20:00

Argentina	3–0	Paraguay
Simeone 17', 76'; L. Rolón 48'	Report

Estadio Centenario, Montevideo
Referee: Julio Bascuñán (Chile)
4 February 2015
22:10

Uruguay	0–0	Colombia
	Report

Estadio Centenario, Montevideo
Referee: Enrique Cáceres (Paraguay)

7 February 2015
17:50

Paraguay	1–3	Peru
Díaz 84'	Report	Peña 5'; Cossio 10'; Ugarriza 23'

Estadio Centenario, Montevideo
Referee: Mauro Vigliano (Argentina)
7 February 2015
20:00

Brazil	0–3	Colombia
	Report	Barrera 57'; Rodríguez 73', 90+1'

Estadio Centenario, Montevideo
Referee: Roddy Zambrano (Ecuador)
7 February 2015
22:10

Argentina	2–1	Uruguay
Driussi 35'; Correa 80'	Report	Pereiro 7'

Estadio Centenario, Montevideo
Referee: Ricardo Marques (Brazil)

== Winners ==
2015 South American Youth Football champions

Argentina
Fifth title

== Goalscorers ==
There were 99 goals scored in 35 matches, for an average of 2.83 goals per match.

9 goals

- (Argentina) Giovanni Simeone

5 goals

- (Uruguay) Gastón Pereiro

4 goals

- (Argentina) Ángel Correa
- (Brazil) Marcos Guilherme
- (Colombia) Jeison Lucumí
- (Ecuador) José Francisco Cevallos
- (Peru) Alexander Succar
- (Uruguay) Franco Acosta

3 goals

- (Brazil) Thalles
- (Ecuador) Miguel Parrales
- (Uruguay) Mauro Arambarri

2 goals

- (Chile) Cristián Cuevas
- (Chile) Rodrigo Echeverría
- (Colombia) Jarlan Barrera
- (Colombia) Rafael Santos Borré
- (Colombia) Joao Rodríguez
- (Paraguay) Sergio Díaz
- (Peru) Beto da Silva
- (Peru) Adrián Ugarriza

1 goal

- (Argentina) Facundo Cardozo
- (Argentina) Lucio Compagnucci
- (Argentina) Rodrigo Contreras
- (Argentina) Sebastián Driussi
- (Argentina) Tomás Martínez
- (Argentina) Facundo Monteseirín
- (Argentina) Leonardo Rolón
- (Argentina) Maxi Rolón
- (Argentina) Leonardo Suárez
- (Bolivia) Erick Iragua
- (Bolivia) Alberto Pinto
- (Brazil) Gabriel Barbosa
- (Brazil) Kenedy
- (Brazil) Léo Pereira
- (Brazil) Malcom
- (Brazil) Nathan
- (Brazil) Yuri Mamute
- (Colombia) Mauro Manotas
- (Colombia) Juan Ferney Otero
- (Ecuador) Robert Burbano
- (Ecuador) Luis Cangá
- (Paraguay) Luis Amarilla
- (Paraguay) Enrique Araújo
- (Paraguay) Iván Cañete
- (Paraguay) Jesús Medina
- (Paraguay) Danilo Santacruz
- (Paraguay) Gustavo Viera
- (Peru) Alexis Cossio
- (Peru) Aurelio Gonzales-Vigil
- (Peru) Sergio Peña
- (Uruguay) Rodrigo Amaral
- (Uruguay) Gastón Faber
- (Venezuela) Jaime Moreno

1 own goal

- (Chile) Rodrigo Echeverría (against Uruguay)
- (Peru) Brian Bernaola (against Argentina)
- (Peru) Daniel Prieto (against Argentina)

== Qualification for international tournaments ==
=== Qualified teams for FIFA U-20 World Cup ===
The following four teams from CONMEBOL qualified for the 2015 FIFA U-20 World Cup in New Zealand.

Team	Qualified on	Previous appearances in FIFA U-20 World Cup^{1}
Argentina	4 February 2015	13 (**1979**, 1981, 1983, 1989, 1991, **1995**, **1997**, 1999, **2001**, 2003, **2005**, **2007**, 2011)
Brazil	4 February 2015	17 (1977, 1981, **1983**, **1985**, 1987, 1989, 1991, **1993**, 1995, 1997, 1999, 2001, **2003**, 2005, 2007, 2009, **2011**)
Uruguay	4 February 2015	12 (1977, 1979, 1981, 1983, 1991, 1993, 1997, 1999, 2007, 2009, 2011, 2013)
Colombia	4 February 2015	8 (1985, 1987, 1989, 1993, 2003, 2005, 2011, 2013)

^{1} Bold indicates champions for that year. Italic indicates hosts for that year.

=== Qualified teams for Pan American Games ===
The four teams which finished third to sixth, Brazil, Uruguay, Peru, and Paraguay, qualified for the 2015 Pan American Games men's football tournament in Canada. This was changed from the previous set-up where the South American Under-17 Football Championship was used as qualification for the Pan American Games football tournament.

The following four teams from CONMEBOL qualified for the 2015 Pan American Games men's football tournament.

Team	Qualified on	Previous appearances in Pan American Games^{1}
Peru	4 February 2015	0 (Debut)
Paraguay	4 February 2015	4 (1951, 1987, 1995, 2003)
Brazil	7 February 2015	10 (1959, **1963**, **1975**, **1979**, 1983, **1987**, 1995, 2003, 2007, 2011)
Uruguay	7 February 2015	5 (1963, 1975, **1983**, 1999, 2011)

^{1} Bold indicates champions for that year. Italic indicates hosts for that year.

=== Qualified teams for Summer Olympics ===
Same as previous Youth Championships that were held one year prior to the Olympics, CONMEBOL used the tournament to determine which men's under-23 national teams from South America qualify for the Olympic football tournament. Since Brazil already qualified automatically as hosts of the 2016 Summer Olympics men's football tournament, the top-ranked team other than Brazil qualified directly, while the second top-ranked team other than Brazil advanced to a play-off against the third-placed team of the 2015 CONCACAF Men's Olympic Qualifying Championship for the final berth in the Olympics. Since Brazil finished third in the tournament, Argentina qualified for the Olympics, while Colombia advanced to the play-off, where they defeated the United States to become CONMEBOL's third Olympic representative.

The following three teams from CONMEBOL qualified for the 2016 Summer Olympics men's football tournament.

Team	Qualified on	Previous appearances in Summer Olympics^{1}
Brazil	2 October 2009	12 (1952, 1960, 1964, 1968, 1972, 1976, 1984, 1988, 1996, 2000, 2008, 2012)
Argentina	7 February 2015	7 (1928, 1960, 1964, 1988, 1996, **2004**, **2008**)
Colombia	29 March 2016	4 (1968, 1972, 1980, 1992)

^{1} Bold indicates champion for that year. Italic indicates host for that year. Statistics include all Olympic format (current Olympic under-23 format started in 1992).

== Media coverage ==
=== South América ===
- Argentina: TyC Sports (all matches are broadcast live) and Channel 7 (Argentina matches only)
- Brazil: SporTV (all matches) and SBT (all matches of Brazil and some matches)
- Colombia: Caracol TV (all Colombia matches live)
- Paraguay: Tigo Sports (all matches are broadcast live) and La Tele (all matches of Paraguay and some matches)
- Peru: América Televisión (all matches are broadcast live)
- Uruguay: Tenfield (all matches are broadcast live on VTV, VTV Plus and GolTV Latin América)

=== North America ===
- USA: beIN Sports (all matches live on beIN Sports en Español)

=== Europe ===
- United Kingdom: Bet365 online streaming (all matches live)

== See also ==
- 2015 FIFA U-20 World Cup
- Football at the 2015 Pan American Games – Men's tournament
- Football at the 2016 Summer Olympics CONCACAF–CONMEBOL play-off
- Football at the 2016 Summer Olympics – Men's tournament
