= Joel Bejarano =

Bolivian footballer (born 1996)

Personal information
- Full name: Joel Bejarano Azogue
- Date of birth: March 21, 1996 (age 30)
- Place of birth: Santa Cruz de la Sierra
- Height: 1.70 m (5 ft 7 in)
- Position: Midfielder

Team information
- Current team: GV San José
- Number: 21

Youth career
- 2010–2013: Tahuichi Academy

Senior career*
Years	Team	Apps	(Gls)
2013–2015	Blooming	21	(1)
2015–2017	Oriente Petrolero	23	(1)
2018–2022	Independiente Petrolero	63	(4)
2023	Wilstermann	4	(0)
2023–	GV San José	19	(0)

International career
2013	Bolivia U-17	2	(0)
2015	Bolivia U-20	2	(0)
- * Club domestic league appearances and goals as of 30 December 2025

Joel Bejarano Azogue (born March 21, 1996, in Santa Cruz de la Sierra) is a Bolivian footballer who currently plays as a midfielder for GV San José.

== Club career statistics ==
Club performance			League		Cup		League Cup		Total	
Season	Club	League	Apps	Goals	Apps	Goals	Apps	Goals	Apps	Goals
League		Apertura and Clausura			Copa Aerosur		Total			
2013/14	Blooming	Liga de Fútbol Profesional Boliviano	18	1	-	-	-	-	18	1
2014/15	Blooming	Liga de Fútbol Profesional Boliviano	3	0	-	-	-	-	3	0
2015/16	Oriente Petrolero	Liga de Fútbol Profesional Boliviano	0	0	-	-	-	-	0	0
Total			21	1	-	-	-	-	21	1

== International career ==
Bejarano was a member of the Bolivian squad that participated in the 2013 South American Under-17 Football Championship. He was also summoned to the Bolivian U-20 team to play in the 2015 South American Youth Football Championship.
