= Lucio Compagnucci =

Argentine professional footballer

Personal information
- Full name: Lucio Compagnucci
- Date of birth: 23 February 1996 (age 30)
- Place of birth: Buenos Aires, Argentina
- Height: 1.73 m (5 ft 8 in)
- Position: Defensive midfielder

Team information
- Current team: Gimnasia y Esgrima

Youth career
- –2014: Vélez Sársfield

Senior career*
| Years | Team | Apps | (Gls) |
| 2014–2016 | Vélez Sársfield | 8 | (0) |
| 2016–2017 | Huracán | 19 | (0) |
| 2018 | San Luis | 10 | (1) |
| 2018 | Real Murcia | 0 | (0) |
| 2019–2020 | Gimnasia de Mendoza | 6 | (0) |
| 2020 | → General Díaz (loan) | 0 | (0) |
| 2021 | All Boys | 25 | (3) |
| 2022 | Mitre | 0 | (0) |

International career
| 2013 | Argentina U17 | 13 | (1) |
| 2015 | Argentina U20 | 5 | (1) |
- * Club domestic league appearances and goals as of 25 October 2024

Lucio Compagnucci (born 23 February 1996) is an Argentine professional footballer who plays as an offensive midfielder. He last played for Mitre,

== Club career ==
Compagnucci debuted professionally for Vélez Sarsfield playing as a starter in the last fixture of the 2014 Argentine Primera División, a 0–2 defeat to San Lorenzo de Almagro. He made eight appearances in the Primera before joining Huracán in June 2016.

In 2021 and 2022, Compagnucci played for All Boys and Mitre, respectively.

== International career ==
In 2013, Compagnucci won with the Argentina national under-17 football team the South American Under-17 Football Championship, playing 7 games as a starter. He was subsequently called to play the FIFA U-17 World Cup with the team, achieving a 4th-place finish. The midfielder played 6 games as a starter, missing only the second group stage game due to being sent off in the team's debut. He also scored once, in the 1–4 defeat to Sweden for the third place match.

Two years later, Compagnucci was called by Humberto Grondona (who had previously been his coach in the under-17 national team) to play the 2015 South American Youth Championship with the Argentina national under-20 football team. In the team's championship winning campaign, the midfielder played 5 games and scored the last-minute equalizer against Colombia in the final stage. However, this game would be his last of the competition, after being suspended for three matches due to an aggression to an opposition player.

== Personal life ==
Lucio is the son of former footballer and current coach Carlos Compagnucci, who both played for and managed Vélez Sarsfield.

== Honours ==
=== International ===
Argentina U-17

- South American Under-17 Football Championship (1): 2013

Argentina U-20

- South American U-20 Football Championship (1): 2015
