= Braulio Uraezaña =

Bolivian footballer (born 1995)

Personal information
- Full name: Braulio Uraezaña Cuñaendi
- Date of birth: March 26, 1995 (age 31)
- Place of birth: Urubichá, Bolivia
- Height: 1.86 m (6 ft 1 in)
- Position: Goalkeeper

Team information
- Current team: Blooming
- Number: 1

Youth career
- 2013: San José

Senior career*
Years	Team	Apps	(Gls)
2013–	Blooming	146	(0)
2015	→ Real Santa Cruz (loan)	0	(0)
2016	→ Real Potosí (loan)	0	(0)
2018	→ Guabirá (loan)	4	(0)

International career
2015	Bolivia U-20	0	(0)
- * Club domestic league appearances and goals as of 30 December 2025

Braulio Uraezaña Cuñaendi (born March 26, 1995) is a Bolivian footballer who plays goalkeeper for Blooming.

== International career ==
Uraezaña was summoned to the Bolivian U-20 team to play in the 2015 South American Youth Football Championship.

== Career statistics ==
Club performance			League		Cup		League Cup		Total	
Season	Club	League	Apps	Goals	Apps	Goals	Apps	Goals	Apps	Goals
League		Apertura and Clausura			Copa Aerosur		Total			
2013/14	Blooming	Liga de Fútbol Profesional Boliviano	5	0	-	-	-	-	5	0
2014/15	Blooming	Liga de Fútbol Profesional Boliviano	3	-	-	-	-	-	3	-
2015/16	Blooming	Liga de Fútbol Profesional Boliviano	-	-	-	-	-	-	-	-
Total			3	0	-	-	-	-	3	0
