= Leonardo Suárez =

Argentine footballer (born 1996)

Leo Suárez
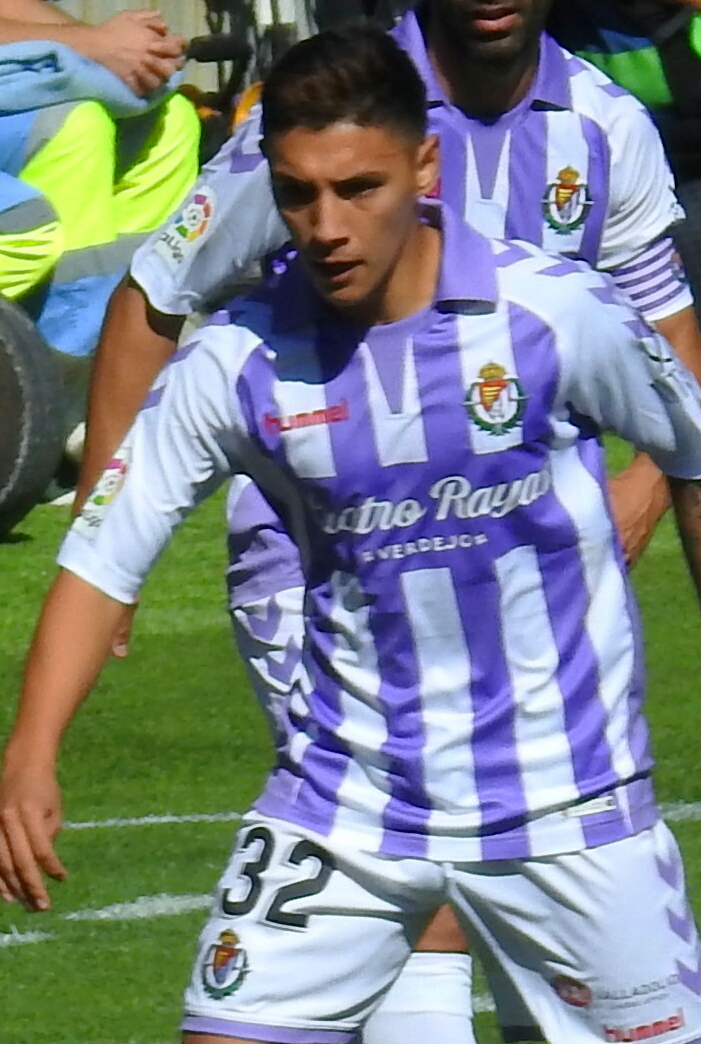
- Suárez with Real Valladolid in 2018

Personal information
- Full name: Leonardo Gabriel Suárez
- Date of birth: 30 March 1996 (age 30)
- Place of birth: San Martín, Argentina
- Height: 1.63 m (5 ft 4 in)
- Position: Winger

Team information
- Current team: Boston River
- Number: 8

Youth career
- 2000–2002: Villa Esperanza
- 2002–2014: Boca Juniors

Senior career*
Years	Team	Apps	(Gls)
2014–2015	Boca Juniors	2	(0)
2015–2018	Villarreal B	79	(12)
2016–2020	Villarreal	9	(1)
2018	→ Real Valladolid (loan)	12	(2)
2019	→ Mallorca (loan)	16	(1)
2020–2024	América	74	(10)
2022	→ Santos Laguna (loan)	31	(8)
2024–2026	UNAM	28	(4)
2025	→ Estudiantes (loan)	2	(0)
2026–	Boston River	5	(0)

International career^{‡}
2011	Argentina U15	5	(1)
2013	Argentina U17	11	(3)
2015	Argentina U20	3	(1)
- * Club domestic league appearances and goals as of 18:26, 2 January 2026 (UTC) ‡ National team caps and goals as of 18 December 2019

Leonardo "Leo" Gabriel Suárez (Spanish pronunciation: [leoˈnaɾðo ˈswaɾes]; born on 30 March 1996) is an Argentine professional footballer who plays as a winger.

== Club career ==
=== Boca Juniors ===
Born in General San Martín Partido, Suárez joined Boca Juniors' youth setup in 2002, aged six, after starting it out at lowly Villa Esperanza. He made his first team debut on 9 November 2014, coming on as a second half substitute for Federico Carrizo in a 2–0 home win against Club Atlético Tigre for the Primera División championship.

=== Villarreal ===
On 10 December 2014 Suárez moved to Villarreal CF, after agreeing to a 5 1/2-year deal for a €2million fee. He was assigned to the reserves in Segunda División B.

Suárez made his La Liga debut on 17 December 2016 as an 88th-minute substitute for Alexandre Pato in a 3–1 victory over Sporting de Gijón.

==== Valladolid (loan) ====
On 19 August 2018, Suárez was loaned to fellow top division side Real Valladolid, for one year. He recently scored the winner in a 1–0 victory over his parent club in La Liga.

==== Mallorca (loan) ====
In January 2019, Suárez was loaned to RCD Mallorca until the end of the season.

=== Club America ===
On 12 January 2020 Suárez signed for Liga MX side Club America ending his five-year spell in Europe.

== International career ==
A regular name in Argentina's youth squads, Suárez was called up by under-20s for the 2015 South American Youth Football Championship, held in Uruguay. He made his debut in the competition on 18 January, coming on as a second-half substitute for Ángel Correa in a 6–2 routing over Peru; he also scored the fifth and assisted Giovanni Simeone in the sixth.

Four days later, Suárez started in a 3–0 win against Bolivia, and provided the assist in all of the three goals. He finished the tournament with three appearances and four assists, as his side were crowned champions.

== Honours ==
América

- Liga MX: Apertura 2023

Estudiantes

- Primera División: 2025 Clausura

Argentina U17

- South American U-17 Championship: 2013

Argentina U20

- South American Youth Football Championship: 2015
