= Iván Pardo =

Chilean footballer (born 1995)

Personal information
- Full name: Iván Marcelo Pardo Córdova
- Date of birth: 10 November 1995 (age 30)
- Place of birth: Peumo, Chile
- Height: 1.82 m (5 ft 11 1/2 in)
- Position: Midfielder

Youth career
- 2008–2013: O'Higgins

Senior career*
Years	Team	Apps	(Gls)
2013–2017	O'Higgins	6	(0)
2016	→ San Marcos (loan)	9	(0)
2017	Colchagua	15	(0)
2018	Fernández Vial	20	(2)
2019	Ñublense	3	(0)
2020	Trasandino	–	(–)

International career
2015	Chile U20	2	(0)
- * Club domestic league appearances and goals as of 29 August 2020

Iván Marcelo Pardo Córdova (born 10 November 1995) is a Chilean former footballer who last played for Trasandino as a midfielder.

== Career ==
=== Youth career ===
Pardo started his career at Primera División de Chile club O'Higgins. He progressed from the under categories club all the way to the senior team.

=== O'Higgins ===
Pardo won the Apertura 2013-14 with O'Higgins, in the 2013–14 Súper Final Apertura against Universidad Católica, being the first title for O'Higgins.

In 2014, he won the Supercopa de Chile against Deportes Iquique, in the match that O'Higgins won at the penalty shoot-out.

He participated with the club in the 2014 Copa Libertadores where they faced Deportivo Cali, Cerro Porteño and Lanús, being third and being eliminated in the group stage.

== International career ==
Pardo represented Chile U20 at the 2014 Aspire Four Nations International Tournament in Qatar. The next year, he was part of the Chile squad who played the 2015 South American Youth Championship in Uruguay.

== Honours ==
=== Club ===
O'Higgins

- Primera División: Apertura 2013-14
- Supercopa de Chile: 2014

=== Individual ===
O'Higgins

- Medalla Santa Cruz de Triana: 2014
