= Nelson Espinoza =

Chilean footballer (born 1995)

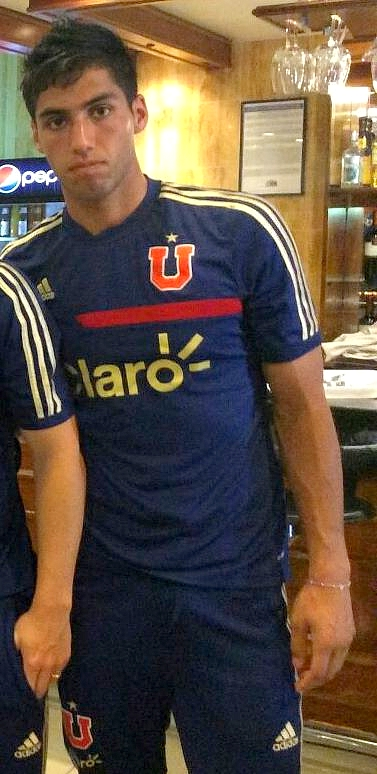
- Espinoza with Universidad de Chile in 2014

Personal information
- Full name: Nelson Francisco Espinoza Díaz
- Date of birth: September 22, 1995 (age 31)
- Place of birth: Doñihue, Chile
- Height: 1.90 m (6 ft 3 in)
- Position: Goalkeeper

Team information
- Current team: Unión La Calera

Youth career
- 2009–2015: Universidad de Chile

Senior career*
| Years | Team | Apps | (Gls) |
| 2013–2022 | Universidad de Chile | 13 | (0) |
| 2017–2018 | → San Luis (loan) | 2 | (0) |
| 2019 | → Magallanes (loan) | 9 | (0) |
| 2021 | → O'Higgins (loan) | 11 | (0) |
| 2022 | → Deportes Copiapó (loan) | 2 | (0) |
| 2023–2025 | Deportes Copiapó | 38 | (0) |
| 2026– | Unión La Calera | 0 | (0) |

International career^{‡}
| 2014–2015 | Chile U20 | | |
- * Club domestic league appearances and goals as of 20 January 2026 ‡ National team caps and goals as of 22 January 2015

Nelson Francisco Espinoza Díaz (born 22 September 1995) is a Chilean footballer who plays as a goalkeeper for Unión La Calera.

== Club career ==
He debuted on 15 May 2014 in a match against Audax Italiano for the 2014–15 Copa Chile.

In January 2026, Espinoza signed with Unión La Calera.

== International career ==
In 2014, Vargas represented Chile U20 at the Four Nations International Tournament in Chile. The next year, he was a squad member at the 2015 South American U-20 Championship, but he didn't make any appearance at the tournament.

== Club statistics ==
| Club | Season | League | | Continental | | Cup | | Total | |
| Club | Season | Apps | Goals | Apps | Goals | Apps | Goals | Apps | Goals |
|---|---|---|---|---|---|---|---|---|---|
| Universidad de Chile | 2013–14 | 0 | 0 | 0 | 0 | 0 | 0 | 0 | 0 |
| Universidad de Chile | 2014–15 | 0 | 0 | — | — | 4 | 0 | 4 | 0 |
| Universidad de Chile | 2015–16 | 0 | 0 | 0 | 0 | 0 | 0 | 0 | 0 |
| Universidad de Chile | 2016–17 | 3 | 0 | 0 | 0 | 1 | 0 | 4 | 0 |
| Universidad de Chile | Total | 3 | 0 | 0 | 0 | 5 | 0 | 8 | 0 |
| Career total | | 3 | 0 | 0 | 0 | 5 | 0 | 8 | 0 |
