= Maxi Rolón =

Argentine footballer (1995–2022)

Personal information
- Full name: Maximiliano Brian Rolón
- Date of birth: 19 January 1995
- Place of birth: Rosario, Argentina
- Date of death: 14 May 2022 (aged 27)
- Place of death: Casilda, Argentina
- Height: 1.69 m (5 ft 7 in)
- Position: Winger

Youth career
- Orono
- Atlético Luján
- 2007–2010: Barcelona Juniors Luján
- 2010–2014: Barcelona
- 2013: → Cornellà (loan)

Senior career*
Years	Team	Apps	(Gls)
2014–2016	Barcelona B	24	(2)
2016	Santos	2	(0)
2017	Lugo	2	(0)
2017	Arsenal de Sarandí	4	(0)
2018	Coquimbo Unido	15	(0)
2018–2019	CE Pubilla Casas	2	(3)
2019–2020	Fuerza Amarilla	9	(0)
2020–2021	Al-Diwaniya	3	(2)
Total		61	(7)

International career
2014–2015	Argentina U20	7	(1)
- * Club domestic league appearances and goals

Maximiliano Brian Rolón (19 January 1995 – 14 May 2022) was an Argentine professional footballer who played as a left winger.

He spent several years at Barcelona, where he played 24 games for the B-team before a move to Santos in Brazil in 2016. With the Argentina under-20 team, he won the South American Youth Football Championship in 2015. He subsequently had brief spells in Argentina, Ecuador, Chile and Iraq before his death in a car crash at the age of 27.

== Club career ==
=== Barcelona ===
Born in Rosario, Rolón started his youth career with local club Atlético Luján. In 2007, he joined FC Barcelona's youth setup, but only moved to La Masia three years later. In 2013, he was loaned to UE Cornellà due to his non-EU status, and returned to Barça the following January, being assigned to the Juvenil A squad.

In May 2014 Rolón was promoted to the reserves in Segunda División. After being strongly linked to a possible loan move to Lleida Esportiu in August, he remained at the club and made his debut as a professional on 4 October, replacing Juan Cámara in the 74th minute of a 0–1 home loss against CD Lugo.

On 20 September 2015, with the team now in Segunda División B, Rolón scored his first senior goal, the game's only away to UE Olot for a first victory of the season. On 1 February of the following year, he rescinded his contract.

=== Santos ===
On 16 February 2016, Rolón agreed to a one-year deal with Brazilian club Santos FC. He only signed his contract on 4 March, due to bureaucratic problems.

Rolón made his debut for the club on 21 April 2016, coming on as a late substitute for Rafael Longuine in a 1–1 away draw against Santos-AP. On 6 July, after receiving very little playing time, he rescinded his contract.

=== Later career ===
On 31 January 2017, Rolón returned to Spain and its second level, after signing a six-month deal with Lugo. After only two games played, he left the club again at the end of his contract in June 2017.

Rolón arrived in the Argentine Primera División for the first time in August 2017, signing for Arsenal de Sarandí. The following February, he signed for Coquimbo Unido in Primera B de Chile.

Released by his Chilean club in August 2018, Rolón returned to Spain and joined CE Pubilla Casas of the Segona Catalana in November. He played two games for the club, scoring three goals, one of them a penalty.

In January 2019, Rolón went back to South America, joining Fuerza Amarilla S.C. in the Ecuadorian Serie A. His nine games for the team from Machala included being sent off on 13 July in a 4–1 home loss to C.S. Emelec. In August 2020, the 25-year-old moved to Al-Diwaniya SC in the Iraqi Premier League.

At the time of his death in 2022, Rolón was playing amateur football in Casilda, Santa Fe Province.

== International career ==
Rolón was called up for the Argentina under-20 team in August 2014, for the year's L'Alcúdia International Football Tournament. He appeared regularly during the tournament, also playing against Barcelona in one of the matches.

Rolón was part of the team that won the 2015 South American U-20 Championship in Uruguay. He scored the opening goal of a 2–0 win over Brazil on 1 February.

== Personal life and death ==
Rolón's twin brother, Leonardo, is also a footballer. A right back or right winger, he was a teammate at Arsenal de Sarandí.

Rolón and his 30-year-old brother, Ariel, died when their car collided with a tree in Casilda on the morning of 14 May 2022.

== Career statistics ==
Club	Season	League			Cup		Continental		Other		Total	
Club	Season	Division	Apps	Goals	Apps	Goals	Apps	Goals	Apps	Goals	Apps	Goals
Barcelona B	2014–15	Segunda División	7	0	—						7	0
Barcelona B	2015–16	Segunda División B	17	2	—						17	2
Barcelona B	Total		24	2	—						24	2
Santos	2016	Série A	2	0	3	0	—		0	0	5	0
Lugo	2016–17	Segunda División	2	0	—						2	0
Arsenal de Sarandí	2017–18	Superliga	4	0	—						4	0
Coquimbo Unido	2018	Primera B	15	0	3	3	—				18	3
Pubilla Casas	2018–19	Segona Catalana	2	3	0	0	—				2	3
Fuerza Amarilla	2019	Ecuadorian Serie A	9	0	0	0	—				9	0
Al-Diwaniya	2020–21	Iraqi Premier League	3	2	0	0	—				3	2
Career totals			61	7	6	3	0	0	0	0	67	10

== Honours ==
Barcelona

- UEFA Youth League: 2013–14

Santos

- Campeonato Paulista: 2016

Argentina U20

- South American Youth Football Championship: 2015
