= Facundo Cardozo =

Argentine footballer

Personal information
- Full name: Facundo Omar Cardozo
- Date of birth: 6 April 1995 (age 31)
- Place of birth: San Miguel, Buenos Aires, Argentina
- Height: 1.82 m (6 ft 0 in)
- Positions: Centre-back; left-back

Team information
- Current team: San Miguel

Youth career
- Vélez Sársfield

Senior career*
Years	Team	Apps	(Gls)
2013–2017	Vélez Sársfield	40	(2)
2016	→ Bolívar (loan)	9	(0)
2016	→ Mumbai City (loan)	6	(0)
2017–2018	Arsenal de Sarandí	11	(0)
2018	Alebrijes de Oaxaca	1	(0)
2019	Coquimbo Unido	5	(0)
2019–2021	All Boys	36	(2)
2021–2022	Platense	16	(0)
2022	Sabail	13	(0)
2023–2024	Arsenal de Sarandí	12	(0)
2024–	San Miguel	68	(3)

International career
2015	Argentina U20	7	(1)
- * Club domestic league appearances and goals as of 17:40, 5 May 2026 (UTC)

Facundo Omar Cardozo (born 6 April 1995) is an Argentine professional footballer who plays as a centre-back or left-back for San Miguel.

== Club career ==
Cardozo is a youth exponent from Vélez Sarsfield. He made his league debut during the 2013–14 season. At 3 November 2013, he scored his first league goal against Quilmes.

After Fernando Tobio left the team for the 2014 Argentine Primera División, Cardozo became a starter along Sebastián Domínguez at centre back.

On 17 January 2016, he signed a loan deal with Bolivian side Bolívar after an official announcement was made through the official Twitter account of the CEO of Club Bolívar, Marcelo Claure.

On 12 August 2016, Vélez Sarsfield announced that Cardozo has signed with Indian Super League side Mumbai City in a six-month loan deal without a purchase option.

== International career ==
In 2015, Cardozo was called to play for the Argentina national under-20 football team in the South American Youth Championship. He was a starter in seven of his team's nine games in the tournament, scoring once and winning the championship.

== Honours ==
Vélez Sarsfield

- Supercopa Argentina: 2013

Argentina U20

- South American Youth Football Championship: 2015
