= Enrique Araújo =

Paraguayan footballer (born 1995)

Personal information
- Full name: Enrique Araújo Álvarez
- Date of birth: 3 October 1995 (age 31)
- Place of birth: Asunción, Paraguay
- Height: 1.76 m (5 ft 9 in)
- Position: Winger

Team information
- Current team: Nacional

Youth career
- 2008–: Nacional

Senior career*
Years	Team	Apps	(Gls)
2014–	Nacional	30	(1)

International career^{‡}
2015–	Paraguay U20	2	(1)
- * Club domestic league appearances and goals as of 16 January 2015 ‡ National team caps and goals as of 16 January 2015

Enrique Araújo Álvarez (born 3 October 1995) is a Paraguayan footballer who plays for Nacional and the Paraguay national under-20 football team.

== Career ==
Araújo debuted in 2014 with the Nacional and since its debut achieved very many continuity.

== International career ==
he was summoned for Paraguay national under-20 football team to play 2015 South American Youth Football Championship.
