= Rodrigo Echeverría =

Chilean footballer (born 1995)

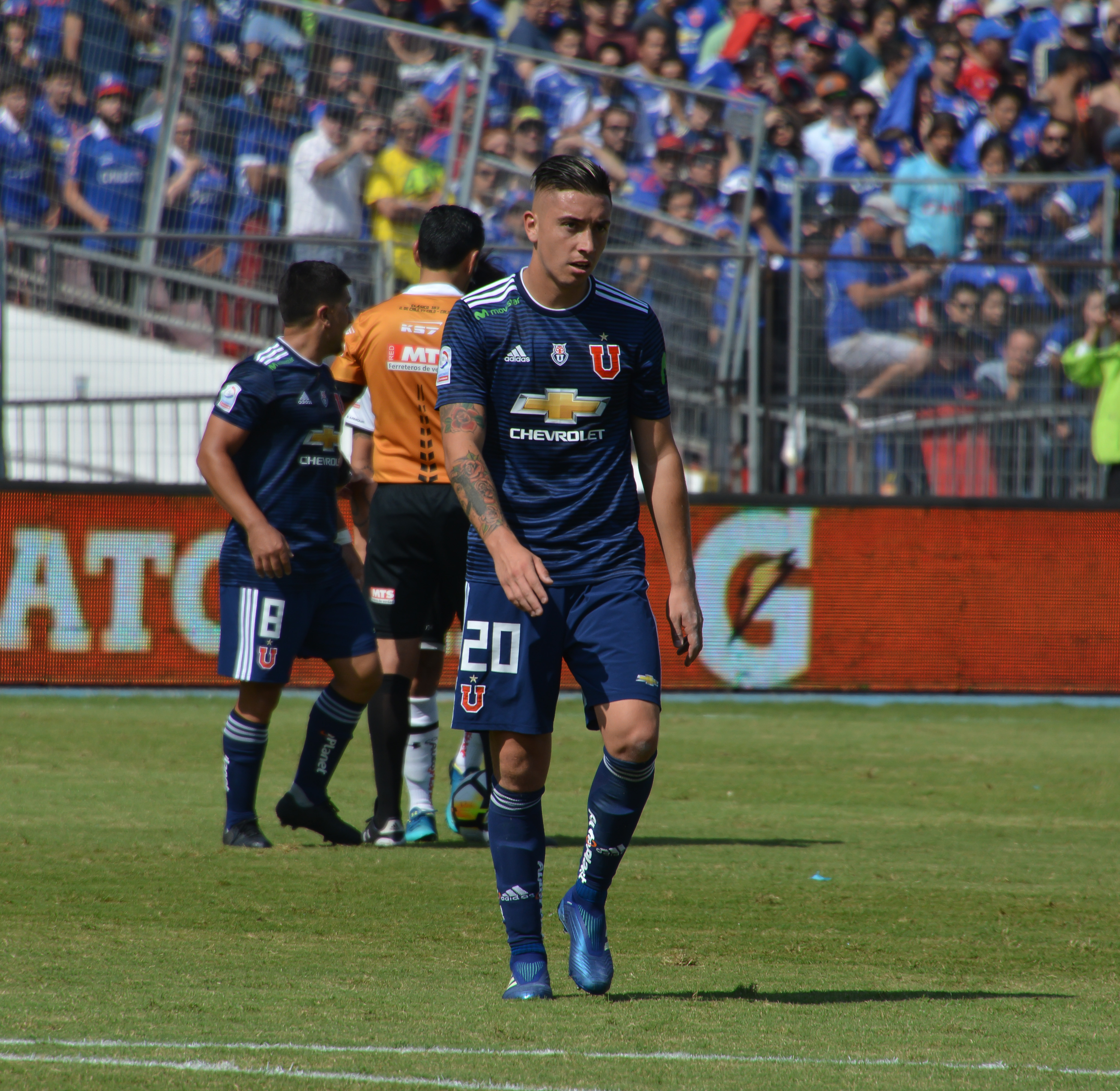
- Echeverría with Universidad de Chile in 2018

Personal information
- Full name: Rodrigo Eduardo Echeverría Sáez
- Date of birth: 7 April 1995 (age 31)
- Place of birth: Santiago, Chile
- Height: 1.78 m (5 ft 10 in)
- Positions: Defender; defensive midfielder

Team information
- Current team: León
- Number: 20

Youth career
- Universidad de Chile

Senior career*
| Years | Team | Apps | (Gls) |
| 2012–2019 | Universidad de Chile | 41 | (0) |
| 2015–2016 | → Iberia (loan) | 31 | (7) |
| 2016–2017 | → Everton (loan) | 28 | (4) |
| 2020–2024 | Everton | 105 | (11) |
| 2023–2024 | → Huracán (loan) | 30 | (1) |
| 2024 | Huracán | 21 | (3) |
| 2025– | León | 56 | (3) |

International career^{‡}
| 2014–2015 | Chile U20 | 4 | (2) |
| 2020– | Chile | 34 | (1) |
- * Club domestic league appearances and goals as of 23:30, 20 September 2026 (UTC) ‡ National team caps and goals as of 6 October 2026

Rodrigo Eduardo Echeverría Sáez (born 17 April 1995) is a Chilean professional footballer who plays for Liga MX club León and the Chile national team. Primarily a central defender, he can also be deployed as a defensive midfielder.

== Club career ==
He debuted on 9 September 2012 in a match against Santiago Wanderers for the 2012 Copa Chile.

In August 2023, Echeverría joined Argentine Primera División side Huracán on loan from Everton de Viña del Mar on a deal for a year with an option to buy. He was finally transferred in July 2024.

In January 2025, Echeverría signed with Liga MX club León.

== International career ==
He represented Chile U20 at friendly tournaments in 2014 and at the 2015 South American U-20 Championship, playing four matches and scoring two goals.

He received his first call up to the Chile senior team for the 2022 FIFA World Cup qualifiers against Uruguay and Colombia in October 2020, but he made his international debut at senior level in the third matchday against Peru on 13 November 2020.

== Career statistics ==
=== International ===
As of match played on 6 October 2026

Appearances and goals by national team and year
| National team | Year | Apps | Goals |
|---|---|---|---|
| Chile | 2020 | 1 | 0 |
| Chile | 2023 | 7 | 1 |
| Chile | 2024 | 11 | 0 |
| Chile | 2025 | 8 | 0 |
| Chile | 2026 | 7 | 0 |
| Total | | 34 | 1 |

List of international goals scored by Rodrigo Echeverría
| No. | Date | Venue | Opponent | Score | Result | Competition |
|---|---|---|---|---|---|---|
| 1. | 11 June 2023 | Municipal Alcaldesa Ester Roa Rebolledo, Concepción, Chile | Cuba | 2–0 | 3–0 | Friendlies |

== Personal life ==
He is nicknamed Eche, a short form of his surname.

== Honours ==
Universidad de Chile

- Copa Chile (1): 2012–13
