= Adrián Ugarriza =

Peruvian footballer (born 1997)

Personal information
- Full name: Adrián Martín Ugarriza Tello
- Date of birth: 1 January 1997 (age 29)
- Place of birth: Lima, Peru
- Height: 1.84 m (6 ft 0 in)
- Position: Forward

Team information
- Current team: Hapoel Be'er Sheva
- Number: 90

Youth career
- USM Porres

Senior career*
Years	Team	Apps	(Gls)
2014–2015	USM Porres	12	(1)
2016–2017	Universitario	26	(4)
2017–2018	Real Garcilaso	14	(2)
2018–2019	UTC Cajamarca	38	(7)
2019–2020	Alianza Lima	13	(0)
2020	Inter Toronto	0	(0)
2020–2023	Cienciano	67	(17)
2023–2024	Sporting Cristal	11	(0)
2024	→ Deportivo Garcilaso (loan)	25	(10)
2024–2025	Deportivo Garcilaso	18	(6)
2025–2026	Ironi Kiryat Shmona	33	(19)
2026–	Hapoel Be'er Sheva	6	(1)

International career^{‡}
2013	Peru U17	9	(0)
2015–2017	Peru U20	11	(2)
2025–	Peru	7	(0)
- * Club domestic league appearances and goals as of 03:53, 7 November 2026 (UTC) ‡ National team caps and goals as of 10:50, 14 November 2026 (UTC)

Adrián Martín Ugarriza Tello (born 1 January 1997) commonly known as Adrián Ugarriza, is a Peruvian professional footballer who plays as a forward for Israeli Premier League club Hapoel Be'er Sheva and Peru national team.

== Club career ==
=== USM Porres ===
Ugarriza began his career with Peruvian Primera División side Universidad de San Martín de Porres, making his professional debut in the Copa Inca on 7 March 2014 against Sport Huancayo. He made his league debut for USM on 7 June 2014 in a match against César Vallejo. Ugarriza's first professional goal came on 13 August 2014 in a 4–2 win over Ayacucho. That season, he made a total of nine league appearances and seven in the Copa Inca. In 2015, he made three league appearances.

=== Universitario ===
On 25 November 2015, Ugarriza signed with Universitario ahead of the 2016 season. That season, he made eighteen league appearances, scoring four goals, and appeared in both legs of Universitario's playoff semi-final series against Melgar. Ugarriza also made his continental debut in the Copa Sudamericana that year as a substitute in a 3–1 loss to Ecuadorian side Emelec. The following season, he made eight league appearances before departing Universitario mid-season.

=== Real Garcilaso ===
On 18 August 2017, Ugarriza signed with Real Garcilaso. He made fourteen league appearances for Real that season, scoring two goals.

=== UTC Cajamarca ===
On 3 January 2018, Ugarriza signed a one-year contract with UTC Cajamarca. That season, he made a career-high 38 league appearances, scoring seven goals, and also made one appearance in the Copa Sudamericana against Uruguayan side Rampla Juniors.

=== Alianza Lima ===
On 14 January 2019, Ugarriza signed with Alianza Lima. That season, he made eleven league appearances and played in both legs of the playoff final against Binacional. He also made three appearances for Alianza in the Copa Libertadores.

=== Inter Toronto ===
On 24 February 2020, Ugarriza signed with Canadian Premier League side Inter Toronto. In July he departed the club due to the COVID-19 pandemic, preventing him from coming to Canada.

=== Ciencano ===
On July 18, 2020 Ugarriza joined Cienciano.

=== Hapoel Be'er Sheva ===
On 1 September 2026, Ugarriza signed a three-year contract with Hapoel Be'er Sheva for a transfer fee of €1 million.

== International career ==
Ugarriza represented Peru at the 2013 South American U-17 Championship. He made nine appearances, including six starts.

Ugarriza was called up by the Peru U20 team for the 2015 South American U-20 Championship, where he was the second-youngest player on the team. He made six appearances in the competition, and scored goals against Uruguay and Paraguay. In 2017, Ugarriza was called up for his second South American U-20 Championship, where he made four appearances.

== Career statistics ==
=== Club ===
As of 20 September 2026

Club	Season	League			National Cup (Note: Includes appearances in the Copa Inca.)		Continental (Note: Includes appearances in the Copa Sudamericana and Copa Libertadores.)		Other (Note: Includes appearances in the Peruvian Primera División Playoffs.)		Total	
Club	Season	Division	Apps	Goals	Apps	Goals	Apps	Goals	Apps	Goals	Apps	Goals
USM Porres	2014	Liga 1	9	1	7	0	—		0	0	16	1
USM Porres	2015	Liga 1	3	0	—		—		0	0	3	0
USM Porres	Total		12	1	7	0	0	0	0	0	19	1
Universitario	2016	Liga 1	18	4	—		1	0	2	0	21	4
Universitario	2017	Liga 1	8	0	—		0	0	0	0	8	0
Universitario	Total		26	4	0	0	1	0	2	0	29	4
Real Garcilaso	2017	Liga 1	14	2	—		—		0	0	14	2
UTC Cajamarca	2018	Liga 1	38	7	—		1	0	0	0	39	7
Alianza Lima	2019	Liga 1	11	0	—		3	0	2	0	16	0
York9	2020	Canadian Premier League	0	0	0	0	—		0	0	0	0
Cienciano	2020	Liga 1	15	3	—		—		—		15	3
Cienciano	2021	Liga 1	22	4	1	0	—		—		23	4
Cienciano	2022	Liga 1	30	10	0	0	2	0	—		32	10
Cienciano	Total		67	18	1	0	2	0	—		70	18
Sporting Cristal	2023	Liga 1	11	0	—		0	0	—		11	0
Deportivo Garcilaso (loan)	2024	Liga 1	25	10	—		6	0	—		31	10
Deportivo Garcilaso	2025	Liga 1	18	6	—		—		—		18	6
Hapoel Ironi Kiryat Shmona	2025–26	Israeli Premier League	31	18	2	0	—		—		33	18
Hapoel Ironi Kiryat Shmona	2026–27	Israeli Premier League	2	1	0	0	—		—		2	1
Hapoel Ironi Kiryat Shmona	Total		33	19	2	0	—		—		35	19
Hapoel Be'er Sheva	2026–27	Israeli Premier League	3	0	0	0	0	0	—		3	0
Career total			258	66	10	0	13	0	4	0	323	66

=== International ===
As of match played on 14 November 2026

Appearances and goals by national team and year
National team	Year	Apps	Goals
Peru	2025	1	0
Peru	2026	6	0
Total		7	0

== Honours ==
Universitario de Deportes

- Torneo Apertura 2016
