= Leonardo Rolón =

Argentine footballer

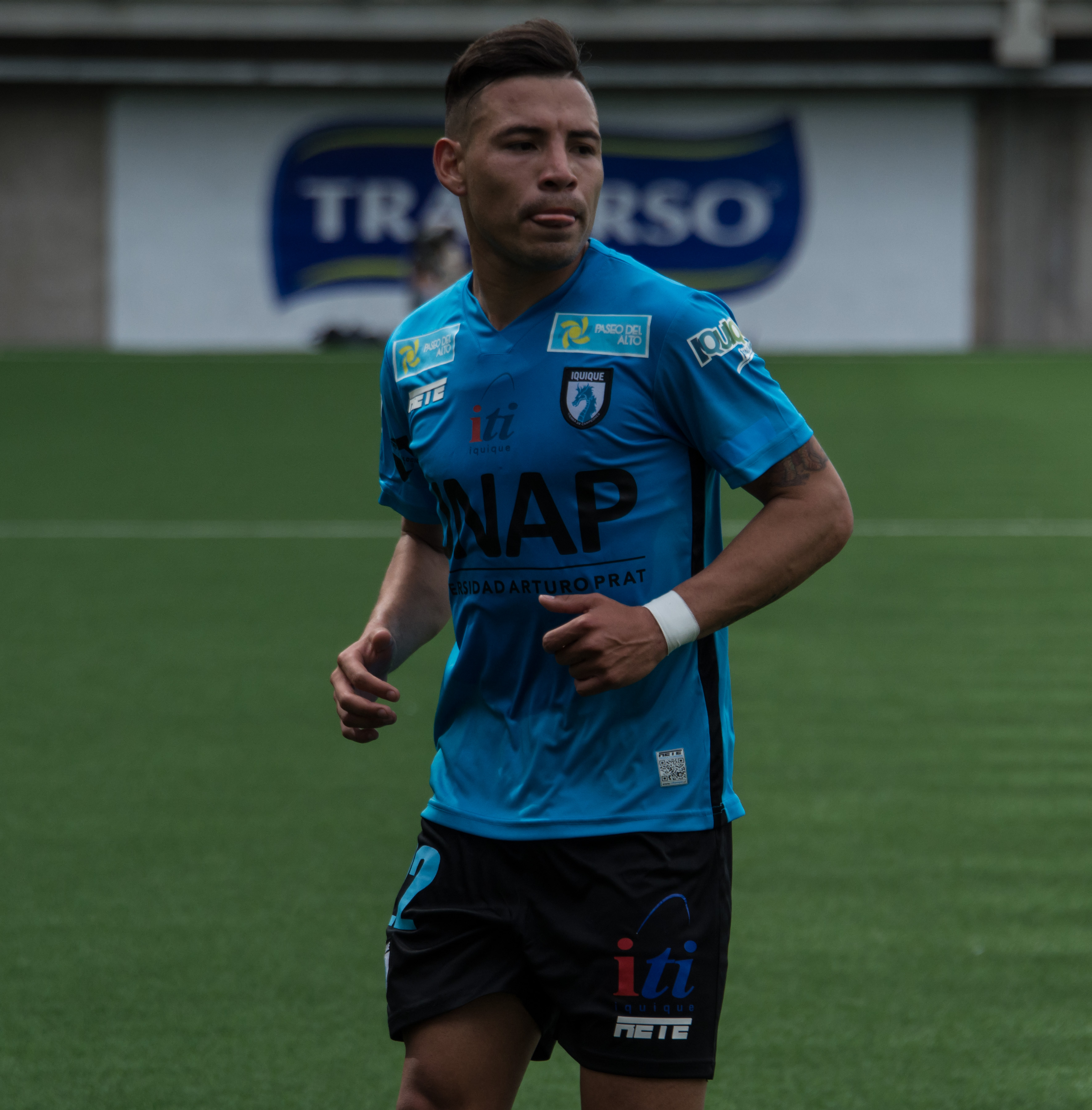
- Rolón with Deportes Iquique in 2018

Personal information
- Full name: Leonardo Gabriel Rolón
- Date of birth: 19 January 1995 (age 31)
- Place of birth: Rosario, Argentina
- Height: 1.71 m (5 ft 7 in)
- Position: Winger

Team information
- Current team: Narva Trans
- Number: 8

Youth career
- Vélez Sarsfield

Senior career*
Years	Team	Apps	(Gls)
2013–2017	Vélez Sarsfield	33	(2)
2015–2016	→ Emelec (loan)	13	(0)
2016–2018	→ Arsenal de Sarandí (loan)	2	(0)
2017–2018	Arsenal de Sarandí	27	(3)
2018	Deportes Iquique	15	(1)
2019	Audax Italiano	7	(0)
2019	Cafetaleros de Chiapas	8	(0)
2020–2021	Quilmes	8	(0)
2022	Mitre	8	(0)
2023	Kelantan	15	(5)
2024–	Narva Trans	32	(6)

International career
2015	Argentina U20	9	(1)
- * Club domestic league appearances and goals as of 10 November 2024

Leonardo Gabriel Rolón (born 19 January 1995) is an Argentine footballer who plays as a winger for Estonian Meistriliiga club Narva Trans.

== Club career ==
Rolón played youth football and debuted professionally with Vélez Sarsfield in 2013, starting as right back in a 1–1 draw with All Boys. He was an unused substitute in his team's victory over Arsenal de Sarandí in the 2013 Supercopa Argentina.

Rolón scored his first goal with Vélez in a 4–1 victory over Rosario Central for the 2014 Final, in which he started as right winger. Upon Agustín Allione's departure from the club, Rolón saw more first team action as the team's right winger, playing 16 matches in the 2014 Argentine Primera División. In this tournament he also scored an olympic goal in the third fixture's 4–0 win over Independiente.

In July 2015, Rolón was sanctioned by Vélez with one week of salary after not showing to play for the reserve's team against Rosario Central. He was subsequently left out of the first team squad and loaned to Emelec in the Ecuadorian Serie A.

== International career ==
In 2015, Rolón was selected to play for the Argentina national under-20 football team in the South American Youth Championship. He played six games (all as a starter) and scored once, helping his team to obtain the championship.

Rolón also started in Argentina's three games in the 2015 FIFA U-20 World Cup.

== Personal life ==
Leonardo's twin brother Maxi was also a professional footballer, who was his teammate for Arsenal de Sarandí and the Argentina under-20 team. Maxi and their 30-year-old brother Ariel died in a car crash in Casilda, Santa Fe Province on 14 May 2022.

== Honours ==
Vélez Sarsfield

- Supercopa Argentina: 2013

Argentina U-20

- South American Youth Football Championship: 2015
