= Sergio Díaz (footballer, born 1998) =

Paraguayan footballer

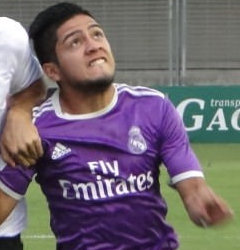
- Díaz playing for Real Madrid B in 2016

Personal information
- Full name: Sergio Ismael Díaz Velázquez
- Date of birth: 5 March 1998 (age 28)
- Place of birth: Itauguá, Paraguay
- Height: 1.70 m (5 ft 7 in)
- Position: Winger

Team information
- Current team: Barcelona SC

Youth career
- 2006–2008: Tacuary
- 2008–2014: Cerro Porteño

Senior career*
| Years | Team | Apps | (Gls) |
| 2014–2016 | Cerro Porteño | 62 | (15) |
| 2016–2021 | Real Madrid Castilla | 36 | (5) |
| 2017–2018 | → Lugo (loan) | 8 | (0) |
| 2018–2019 | → Corinthians (loan) | 2 | (0) |
| 2019–2020 | → Cerro Porteño (loan) | 22 | (5) |
| 2020–2021 | → América (loan) | 7 | (0) |
| 2022–2023 | Cerro Porteño | 15 | (2) |
| 2023–2025 | Panetolikos | 42 | (5) |
| 2025–2026 | Sportivo Luqueño | 23 | (2) |

International career^{‡}
| 2015 | Paraguay U17 | 11 | (3) |
| 2015 | Paraguay U20 | 7 | (2) |
| 2016–2020 | Paraguay U23 | 4 | (2) |
| 2017 | Paraguay | 1 | (0) |
- * Club domestic league appearances and goals as of 2 March 2026 ‡ National team caps and goals as of 27 August 2020

Sergio Ismael Díaz Velázquez (born 5 March 1998) is a Paraguayan professional footballer who plays as a forward for Ecuadorian club Barcelona S.C.

Díaz ranked number one in a list of the most expensive players in Paraguayan football for 2015 published by Diario Extra.

== Club career ==
=== Youth and early career ===
Díaz played at Club Tacuary School of Football for 1 year, before moving to Cerro Porteño. Díaz arrives at Cerro Porteño aged 10, at the club's school of football. He scored approximately 30 goals in the Cerro Porteño U15 team and was then moved to the reserves team. He was coached by Diego Gavilán in the U15 team. In 2013, he was referred to as the Sergio Aguero of Cerro Porteño as the reserves joined in on a practice session with the first-team.

=== Cerro Porteño ===
==== 2014 season ====
Diaz debuted as a 15-year-old in the Primera División Paraguaya, on 27 June 2014, in a 2–1 home victory against Club General Díaz. He entered the field in the 84th minute for Guillermo Beltrán. Díaz then scored against Nacional Asunción in September, handing Cerro Porteño the victory. The player scored a double in a 2–0 home victory against 3 de Febrero on 8 October 2014. Against Boca Juniors in the Copa Sudamericana, Diaz wore the #22 jersey.

During his performances at the 2015 South American Youth Football Championship in January 2015, it was reported that both Liverpool F.C. and Manchester United F.C. were chasing his signing.

==== 2015 season ====
In Diaz's debut for Cerro Porteño in the 2015 Primera División Paraguaya season, he scored one goal in his side's 3–0 away victory against Sportivo Luqueño on 14 February 2015. He signed his first professional contract after turning 18 years old and renewed his contract with Club Cerro Porteño until 2021.

=== Real Madrid ===
Sergio Diaz is the second Paraguayan to play in Real Madrid preceding Javier Acuña.

He played with Real Madrid B at the beginning of the 2016 season.

Diaz was included in Real Madrid U19 squad for UEFA Youth League, making his debut against Sporting Club de Portugal. Diaz scored the opener for Los Blancos, but Sporting eventually equalized.

==== Loan to CD Lugo ====
On 10 August 2017, Díaz was loaned to Segunda División club CD Lugo for one year. He suffered a knee injury on 16 November 2017, which kept him out for the rest of the season.

==== Loan to Corinthians ====
A year later, on 30 July 2018, he was loaned to Brazilian club Corinthians, for one and a half-year.

==== Loan to Cerro Porteño ====
Díaz returned to Cerro Porteño on loan for the 2019–2020 Paraguayan Primera División season.

==== Loan to Club América ====
On 29 July 2020, Díaz joined Liga MX side América on loan with an option to buy.

=== Return to Cerro Porteño ===
On 14 January 2022, Díaz returned to Paraguay, permanently joining Cerro Porteño.

=== Later career ===
In June 2023, Díaz rescinded his contract with Cerro and on 8 July he joined Super League Greece club Panetolikos, signing a two-year contract. He scored his first goal for the club on 19 February 2023, in a 2–2 draw against Asteras Tripoli. On 15 June 2025, he returned to Paraguay, this time joining Sportivo Luqueño. He scored on his debut on 11 July 2025, where Luqueño beat General Caballero 2–0.

== International career ==
In January 2015, Díaz was selected to represent Paraguay U20 at the 2015 South American Youth Football Championship.

The player scored one goal in his debut at the 2016 Toulon Tournament for Paraguay U23.

Díaz held representative honours with the Paraguay national under-23 squad at the 2020 CONMEBOL Pre-Olympic Tournament.

== Personal life ==
Sergio is a self-proclaimed fan of the English football club Arsenal, which he in May 2015 described as his dream destination in the future.

== Career statistics ==
=== Club ===
As of match played 2 March 2026

Appearances and goals by club, season and competition
| Club | Season | League | | | National Cup | | Continental | | Total | |
| Club | Season | Division | Apps | Goals | Apps | Goals | Apps | Goals | Apps | Goals |
|---|---|---|---|---|---|---|---|---|---|---|
| Cerro Porteño | 2014 | Paraguayan Primera División | 20 | 8 | — | | 3 (Note: Appearance(s) in Copa Sudamericana) | 0 | 0 | 8 |
| Cerro Porteño | 2015 | Paraguayan Primera División | 28 | 5 | — | | — | | 0 | 5 |
| Cerro Porteño | 2016 | Paraguayan Primera División | 14 | 2 | — | | 5 (Note: Appearance(s) in Copa Libertadores) | 1 | 0 | 3 |
| Cerro Porteño | Total | | 62 | 15 | 0 | 0 | 8 | 1 | 70 | 16 |
| Real Madrid B | 2016–17 | Segunda División B | 36 | 5 | — | | — | | 36 | 5 |
| Lugo (loan) | 2017–18 | Segunda División | 8 | 0 | 2 | 0 | — | | 10 | 0 |
| Corinthians (loan) | 2018 | Serie A | 2 | 0 | 0 | 0 | 0 | 0 | 2 | 0 |
| Corinthians (loan) | 2019 | Serie A | 0 | 0 | 1 | 0 | 1 | 0 | 2 | 0 |
| Corinthians (loan) | Total | | 2 | 0 | 1 | 0 | 1 | 0 | 4 | 0 |
| Cerro Porteño (loan) | 2019 | Paraguayan Primera División | 18 | 3 | — | | 1 | 0 | 19 | 3 |
| Cerro Porteño (loan) | 2020 | Paraguayan Primera División | 4 | 2 | — | | 2 | 0 | 6 | 2 |
| Cerro Porteño (loan) | Total | | 22 | 5 | 0 | 0 | 3 | 0 | 25 | 5 |
| América (loan) | 2020–21 | Liga MX | 7 | 0 | 0 | 0 | 1 (Note: Appearance(s) in CONCACAF Champions League) | 1 | 8 | 1 |
| Cerro Porteño | 2022 | Paraguayan Primera División | 7 | 2 | — | | 3 | 0 | 10 | 2 |
| Cerro Porteño | 2023 | Paraguayan Primera División | 8 | 0 | — | | 1 | 0 | 9 | 0 |
| Cerro Porteño | Total | | | | 0 | 0 | | | | |
| Panetolikos | 2023–24 | Super League Greece | 25 | 3 | 5 | 0 | — | | 30 | 3 |
| Panetolikos | 2024–25 | Super League Greece | 17 | 2 | 1 | 0 | — | | 18 | 2 |
| Panetolikos | Total | | | | | | 0 | 0 | | |
| Sportivo Luqueño | 2025 | Paraguayan Primera División | 16 | 2 | — | | — | | 16 | 2 |
| Sportivo Luqueño | 2026 | Paraguayan Primera División | 7 | 0 | — | | — | | 7 | 0 |
| Sportivo Luqueño | Total | | | | 0 | 0 | 0 | 0 | | |
| Career total | | | 137 | 25 | 3 | 0 | 13 | 2 | 153 | 27 |

== Honours ==
Corinthians

- Campeonato Paulista: 2019
