= Danilo Santacruz =

Paraguayan footballer (born 1995)

Personal information
- Full name: Juan Danilo Santacruz González
- Date of birth: 12 June 1995 (age 31)
- Place of birth: Caaguazú, Paraguay
- Height: 1.77 m (5 ft 10 in)
- Positions: Attacking midfielder; winger

Team information
- Current team: Madura United
- Number: 8

Youth career
- 2009–2014: Libertad

Senior career*
Years	Team	Apps	(Gls)
2014–2018	Libertad	88	(10)
2018–2022	Nacional	103	(23)
2023	Deportivo Pereira	7	(0)
2024	Guaraní	26	(3)
2025	Tampico Madero	13	(3)
2025–2026	Nacional	17	(3)
2026–	Madura United	1	(0)

International career
2013–2015	Paraguay U20	15	(5)
- * Club domestic league appearances and goals as of 6 September 2026

Juan Danilo Santacruz González (born 12 June 1995) is a Paraguayan footballer who plays as an attacking midfielder or winger for Super League club Madura United.

== Club career ==
=== Early career / Libertad ===
Santacruz was born in the city of Caaguazú. He started his professional career with Libertad at the age of 19. He made his debut for the club against General Díaz in the league first division on 11 August 2014. On 20 October 2014, Santacruz scored his first goal as a professional, with scored 2 goals in a 6–0 home win against General Díaz. He has made 88 league appearances in total, scoring 10 goals with the club.

=== Nacional ===
On 1 July 2018, Santacruz moved to Nacional on loan from Libertad. He made his debut for the club on 18 July 2018, playing full 90-minutes in a 1–2 home loss against Olimpia. Later, he signed permanently with the club.

=== Deportivo Pereira ===
On 23 April 2023, he was signed by Deportivo Pereira.

On 2 August 2023 he scored his first goal with Deportivo Pereira against IDV in 2023 Copa Libertadores the match finish with a result 1-0.

== International career ==
Santacruz was summoned for Paraguay national under-20 team to play 2015 South American Youth Football Championship.

== Career statistics ==
=== Club ===
As of match played 28 November 2022

Club	Season	League			Cup		Continental		Other		Total	
Club	Season	Division	Apps	Goals	Apps	Goals	Apps	Goals	Apps	Goals	Apps	Goals
Libertad	2014	Paraguayan Primera División	13	4	—		0 (Note: Appearance(s) in Copa Sudamericana.)	0	—		13	4
Libertad	2015	Paraguayan Primera División	29	2	—		2 (Note: Zero appearances in Copa Sudamericana, two appearances in Copa Libertadores)	0	—		29	2
Libertad	2016	Paraguayan Primera División	7	2	—		0	0	—		7	2
Libertad	2017	Paraguayan Primera División	28	1	—		5 (Note: two appearances in Copa Sudamericana, three appearances and one goal in Copa Libertadores)	1	—		33	2
Libertad	2018	Paraguayan Primera División	11	1	—		1 (Note: Appearance(s) in Copa Libertadores.)	0	—		12	1
Libertad	Total		88	10	0	0	8	1	—		96	11
Nacional (loan)	2018	Paraguayan Primera División	21	2	—		2	1	—		23	3
Nacional	2019	Paraguayan Primera División	16	3	—		2	0	—		18	3
Nacional	2020	Paraguayan Primera División	26	6	—		2	0	—		28	6
Nacional	2021	Paraguayan Primera División	2	0	—		0	0	—		2	0
Nacional	2022	Paraguayan Primera División	38	12	—		1	0	—		39	12
Nacional	Total		103	23	0	0	7	1	0	0	110	24
Career total			191	33	0	0	15	2	0	0	206	35
