= Jordy Candia =

Bolivian footballer (born 1996)

Personal information
- Full name: Jordy Joan Candia Zeballos
- Date of birth: 20 April 1996 (age 30)
- Place of birth: Bolivia
- Height: 1.79 m (5 ft 10 in)
- Position: Right-back

Team information
- Current team: Blooming
- Number: 2

Youth career
- Callejas

Senior career*
Years	Team	Apps	(Gls)
2014–2015	Callejas		
2015–	Blooming	80	(4)

International career^{‡}
2015	Bolivia U20	3	(0)
2017–	Bolivia	7	(0)
- * Club domestic league appearances and goals as of 10 January 2020 ‡ National team caps and goals as of 10 January 2020

Jordy Joan Candia Zeballos (born 20 April 1996) is a Bolivian professional footballer who plays as a right-back for Blooming.
