= Erick Iragua =

Bolivian footballer (born 1995)

Personal information
- Full name: Erick Gabriel Iragua Parraga
- Date of birth: 30 November 1995 (age 30)
- Place of birth: Santa Cruz, Bolivia
- Height: 1.74 m (5 ft 8 1/2 in)
- Position: Midfielder

Team information
- Current team: Guabirá

Youth career
- 2014: Bolívar

Senior career*
Years	Team	Apps	(Gls)
2014–2015	Universitario de Pando	10	(0)
2015	União da Madeira	0	(0)
2016–2017	Oriente Petrolero	8	(0)
2017	San José	3	(0)
2019–	Guabirá	0	(0)

International career
2015	Bolivia U20	4	(1)
- * Club domestic league appearances and goals as of 30 March 2019

Erick Gabriel Iragua Parraga (born 30 November 1995), commonly known as Erick Iragua, is a Bolivian footballer who plays for Guabirá as a midfielder.

== Club career ==
On 30 June 2015, after suffering top division relegation with Universitario de Pando, Iragua signed a two-year deal with Portuguese club União da Madeira.

== International career ==
He was part of the Bolivia national under-20 football team, who played the 2015 South American Youth Championship in Uruguay. He scored one goal in the competition on 15 January 2015, in a 2–4 defeat against Paraguay.
