= Humberto Grondona =

Argentine footballer and manager

Personal information
- Full name: Humberto Mario Grondona
- Date of birth: 27 October 1957 (age 69)

Senior career*
| Years | Team | Apps | (Gls) |
| 1977 | Tigre | | |
| 1978 | Morón | | |
| 1979–1980 | Arsenal de Sarandi | | |
| 1981 | Comodoro Rivadavia | | |
| 1982–1983 | Gimnasia y Esgrima de Tandil | | |
| 1984 | El León General Madariaga | | |
| 1985–1986 | Arsenal de Sarandi | | |
| 1987–1988 | Deportivo Norte de Mar del Plata | | |

Managerial career
- 1988: Deportivo Armenio
- 1989: Deportivo Mandiyu
- 1992: Racing
- 1994: Nacional, Uruguay (youth)
- 1995: Arsenal de Sarandi
- 1995–1996: Independiente
- 1996–1998: Godoy Cruz
- 1999–2000: América Cochahuayco
- 2001–2005: Mexico U20
- 2007–2008: Talleres
- 2013: Argentina U17
- 2014–2016: Argentina U20
- 2016: Unión La Calera
- 2016–2017: Arsenal de Sarandí
- * Club domestic league appearances and goals

Humberto Grondona (born 27 October 1957) is an Argentine football coach.

== Career ==
He is the son of Julio Grondona, former president of the Argentine Football Association. During the 2014 FIFA World Cup, match tickets were sold on the black market with his name printed on.

In 2013, he coached the Argentina national under-17 football team at the 2013 South American Under-17 Football Championship to their third title.

A year later, he coached the Argentina national under-20 football team at the 2015 South American Youth Football Championship.

== Honours ==
Argentina U17

- South American Under-17 Football Championship: 2013

Argentina U20

- South American Youth Football Championship: 2015
