= Gustavo Viera (Paraguayan footballer) =

Paraguayan footballer (born 1995)

Personal information
- Full name: Gustavo Agustín Viera Velázquez
- Date of birth: 28 August 1995 (age 31)
- Place of birth: Asunción, Paraguay
- Height: 1.75 m (5 ft 9 in)
- Position: Midfielder

Team information
- Current team: Sportivo Trinidense
- Number: 21

Youth career
- 2008: Libertad
- 2014–2015: Corinthians

Senior career*
Years	Team	Apps	(Gls)
2012–2014	Rubio Ñu	44	(5)
2014–2018	Corinthians	0	(0)
2016–2017	→ Rubio Ñu (loan)	57	(2)
2018	Independiente F.B.C.	17	(0)
2019–2020	CS San Lorenzo	32	(1)
2021	Sportivo Luqueño	2	(0)
2022–2024	Carlos A. Mannucci	84	(2)
2025–	Sportivo Trinidense	26	(0)

International career^{‡}
2013–2015	Paraguay U20	13	(2)
- * Club domestic league appearances and goals as of 13 August 2025 ‡ National team caps and goals as of 18:22, 20 September 2015 (UTC)

Gustavo Agustín Viera Velázquez (born 28 August 1995) is a Paraguayan professional footballer who plays as a midfielder for Sportivo Trinidense.

== Career ==
Viera played in his youth career for Libertad, before moving to Rubio Ñu. He made his professional debut for the club in 2012 and remained there until 2014. In August 2014, he transferred to Corinthians in Brazil. Despite already being a professional player, Viera was relocated to Corinthians' youth team. The central midfielder scored the winning goal at the U20 Campeonato Brasileiro final against Atlético Paranaense and was chosen as the best player of the tournament.

== International career ==
He was called by Paraguay national under-20 football team to play in the 2015 South American Youth Football Championship.

== Honours ==
Corinthians

- Campeonato Brasileiro Série A: 2015
