= Alexis Cossio =

Peruvian footballer (born 1995)

Personal information
- Full name: Alexis Cossio Zamora
- Date of birth: 11 February 1995 (age 31)
- Place of birth: Lima, Peru
- Height: 1.84 m (6 ft 0 in)
- Position: Left back

Team information
- Current team: Alianza Atlético
- Number: 2

Senior career*
Years	Team	Apps	(Gls)
2013–2016	Sporting Cristal	73	(5)
2017	Alianza Lima	30	(0)
2018–2019	Real Garcilaso	49	(1)
2020	Ayacucho	29	(1)
2021	Deportivo Municipal	12	(0)
2021–2022	Cienciano	22	(0)
2022–2024	Carlos A. Mannucci	50	(1)
2025–	Alianza Atlético	22	(1)

International career
2015	Peru U-20	9	(1)
- * Club domestic league appearances and goals as of 30 December 2025

Alexis Cossio Zamora (born 11 February 1995) is a Peruvian footballer who plays for Alianza Atlético as a left back.

== International career ==
Cossio was named in Peru's provisional squad for Copa América Centenario but was cut from the final squad.

== Honours ==
Sporting Cristal

Winner

- Peruvian Primera División: 2014
