= Iván Cañete =

Paraguayan footballer (born 1995)

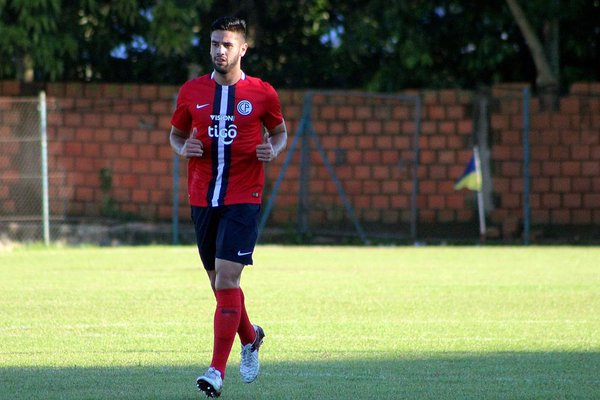
- Cañete training with Cerro Porteño

Personal information
- Full name: Iván Gabriel Cañete Martínez
- Date of birth: 22 April 1995 (age 31)
- Place of birth: Luque, Paraguay
- Height: 1.86 m (6 ft 1 in)
- Position: Centre-back

Youth career
- 2007–2012: Cerro Porteño

Senior career*
Years	Team	Apps	(Gls)
2013	Cerro Porteño	2	(0)
2014–2015	Atlético Madrid	5	(0)
2016–2019	Cerro Porteño	6	(0)
2017	→ Rubio Ñu (loan)	4	(0)
2019	Madureira	6	(0)
2020	Palmaflor	3	(1)
2020	Zulia	5	(1)
2021–	General Díaz	7	(1)

International career
2011	Paraguay U17		
- * Club domestic league appearances and goals

Iván Gabriel Cañete Martínez (born 22 April 1995) is a Paraguayan footballer who plays as a centre-back.

== Career ==
At the age of 12, Cañete moved to Spain, where he played for the youth academy of Rayo Vallecano.

For 2016, he returned to Paraguay to join Cerro Porteño after failing to make an appearance for Atlético Madrid, one of Spain's most successful clubs. However, he soon suffered an injury there.

For 2019, Cañete signed for Madureira Esporte Clube in Brazil.

For 2020, he signed for the Bolivian side Club Atlético Palmaflor.
