= Aurelio Gonzales-Vigil =

Peruvian footballer (born 1996)

Personal information
- Full name: José Aurelio Gonzales-Vigil Bentín
- Date of birth: 1 March 1996 (age 30)
- Place of birth: Lima, Peru
- Height: 1.75 m (5 ft 9 in)
- Position: Forward

Team information
- Current team: Santa Rosa
- Number: 11

Youth career
- Esther Grande

Senior career*
| Years | Team | Apps | (Gls) |
| 2014–2017 | Melgar | 22 | (4) |
| 2017 | Alianza Lima | 5 | (0) |
| 2017–2018 | Ayacucho | 34 | (6) |
| 2019 | Unión Huaral | 20 | (3) |
| 2020 | Carlos Stein | 19 | (2) |
| 2021– | Santa Rosa | 7 | (0) |

International career
| 2015 | Peru U-20 | 5 | (1) |
Medal record
Melgar
| Winner | Peruvian League | 2015 |
- * Club domestic league appearances and goals as of 13:41, 1 August 2021 (UTC)

José Aurelio Gonzales-Vigil Bentín (born 1 March 1996) is a Peruvian footballer who plays for Cultural Santa Rosa, as a forward.
