= Miguel Vargas (footballer, born 1996) =

Chilean footballer (born 1996)

Personal information
- Full name: Miguel Ángel Vargas Mañán
- Date of birth: 15 June 1996 (age 30)
- Place of birth: Santiago, Chile
- Height: 1.83 m (6 ft 0 in)
- Position: Goalkeeper

Team information
- Current team: Universitario
- Number: 25

Youth career
- 2008–2015: Universidad Católica

Senior career*
Years	Team	Apps	(Gls)
2015–2020	Universidad Católica	0	(0)
2017	→ Deportes Santa Cruz (loan)	36	(0)
2019	→ Cobresal (loan)	0	(0)
2020	→ Unión La Calera (loan)	1	(0)
2021	Unión La Calera	2	(0)
2022–2023	Cienciano	59	(0)
2024	Deportivo Garcilaso	24	(0)
2025–	Universitario	11	(0)

International career^{‡}
2013	Chile U17	4	(0)
2014–2015	Chile U20	11	(0)
- * Club domestic league appearances and goals as of 1 May 2021 ‡ National team caps and goals as of 22 January 2015

Miguel Ángel Vargas Mañán (born 15 June 1996) is a Chilean footballer who currently plays for Peruvian Liga 1 club Universitario as a goalkeeper.

== Club career ==
Vargas came from the youth ranks of Universidad Católica, where he arrived at the age of 12, being promoted to the senior team in 2015 under manager Mario Salas.

== International career ==
In 2014, Vargas represented Chile U20 at two Four Nations International Tournaments in Qatar and Chile. The next year, he won the L'Alcúdia Tournament.

He got his first call up to the senior Chile squad for a friendly against Paraguay in September 2015.

== Personal life ==
Vargas is of Peruvian descent and has been with the Chile national team at under levels. Also, his grandfather, Gustavo Vargas, was a goalkeeper who played for Peruvian club Alianza Lima. Since December 2021, Vargas holds the Peruvian nationality, so he is eligible to play for Peru.

He is nicknamed Manotas (Big Hands) since he was a child due to the fact that a football coach noticed he wore a big gloves in a training session for Colo-Colo.

== Honours ==
Universidad Católica

- Primera División (3): 2016–A, 2016–C, 2018
- Supercopa de Chile (1): 2016

Universitario de Deportes

- Peruvian Primera División: 2025

Chile U20

- L'Alcúdia International Tournament (1): 2015
