= Daniel Prieto =

Peruvian footballer (born 1995)

Personal information
- Full name: Daniel Arturo Prieto Solimano
- Date of birth: 18 September 1995 (age 31)
- Place of birth: Lima, Peru
- Height: 1.91 m (6 ft 3 in)
- Position: Goalkeeper

Team information
- Current team: Alianza Atlético
- Number: 95

Youth career
- Alianza Lima
- 2014: Rayo Vallecano

Senior career*
Years	Team	Apps	(Gls)
2012–2019	Alianza Lima	33	(0)
2019	→ Cienciano (loan)	14	(0)
2020	Deportivo Llacuabamba	3	(0)
2021	Deportivo Municipal	3	(0)
2022	Unión Comercio	2	(0)
2023	Alianza Universidad	26	(0)
2024–	Alianza Atlético	10	(0)

International career
2015	Peru U-20	7	(0)
- * Club domestic league appearances and goals as of 1 December 2025

Daniel Arturo Prieto Solimano (born 19 September 1995) is a Peruvian footballer who plays as a goalkeeper for Peruvian club Alianza Atlético.
