= Brian Bernaola =

Peruvian footballer (born 1995)

Personal information
- Full name: Brian Robert Edson Bernaola Acosta
- Date of birth: 17 January 1995 (age 31)
- Place of birth: Ica, Peru
- Height: 1.79 m (5 ft 10 in)
- Position: Centre back

Team information
- Current team: FC Cajamarca
- Number: 16

Senior career*
Years	Team	Apps	(Gls)
2014–2018	Sporting Cristal	14	(0)
2015	→ Deportivo Municipal (loan)	13	(0)
2017	→ Sport Rosario (loan)	19	(0)
2018	→ Sport Rosario (loan)	4	(1)
2019	Carlos A. Mannucci	0	(0)
2019	Deportivo Coopsol	15	(1)
2020	Atlético Grau	4	(0)
2021	Alianza Universidad	15	(0)
2022	Unión Huaral	21	(0)
2023	Deportivo Coopsol	22	(0)
2024	San Marcos	11	(2)
2025	Santos	11	(0)
2025–	FC Cajamarca	11	(0)

International career^{‡}
2015	Peru U-20	8	(0)
2015	Peru U-22	3	(0)
- * Club domestic league appearances and goals as of 21 March 2026 ‡ National team caps and goals as of 21 July 2015

Brian Robert Edson Bernaola Acosta (born 17 January 1995) is a Peruvian footballer who plays for FC Cajamarca, as a centre back.

== Honours ==
Sporting Cristal

- Peruvian Primera División: 2014, 2016

FC Cajamarca

- Liga 2: 2025
