= Ángel Correa =

Argentine footballer (born 1995)

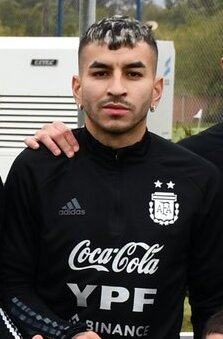
- Correa with Argentina in 2022

Personal information
- Full name: Ángel Martín Correa Martínez
- Date of birth: 9 March 1995 (age 31)
- Place of birth: Rosario, Santa Fe, Argentina
- Height: 1.71 m (5 ft 7 in)
- Positions: Forward; right winger

Team information
- Current team: River Plate
- Number: 10

Youth career
- Alianza Sport
- Tiro
- 2007–2012: San Lorenzo

Senior career*
Years	Team	Apps	(Gls)
2012–2014	San Lorenzo	48	(10)
2014–2025	Atlético Madrid	335	(68)
2025–2026	Tigres UANL	41	(16)
2026–	River Plate	15	(5)

International career^{‡}
2015	Argentina U20	11	(6)
2016	Argentina Olympic	2	(1)
2015–	Argentina	28	(3)
Medal record
Men's football
Representing Argentina
FIFA World Cup
Winner	2022 Qatar
Copa América
Winner	2021 Brazil
South American U-20 Championship
Winner	2015 Uruguay
- * Club domestic league appearances and goals as of 22:44, 1 November 2026 (UTC) ‡ National team caps and goals as of 03:41, 6 June 2025 (UTC)

Ángel Martín Correa Martínez (Spanish pronunciation: [ˈaŋxel koˈrea]; born 9 March 1995) is an Argentine professional footballer who plays as a forward, attacking midfielder or right winger for Argentine Primera División club River Plate and the Argentina national team.

Correa began his career at San Lorenzo, where he made his professional debut and contributed to the club's victory in the Copa Libertadores in 2014. He subsequently joined Atlético Madrid, though a heart condition requiring surgery delayed his debut. Over the course of a decade with the club, he made more than 400 appearances and was part of the squad that claimed the UEFA Europa League in 2018 and the La Liga title in 2021. After a brief spell in Mexico, he returned to Argentina to play for River Plate.

Correa captained the Argentina U-20 to victory at the 2015 South American U-20 Championship, where he was named Player of the Tournament. Since making his senior debut, he has been a consistent member of the squad. He represented Argentina at the 2021 Copa América and the 2022 FIFA World Cup, contributing to the team's success in both tournaments.

== Club career ==
=== San Lorenzo ===
Born in Rosario, Santa Fe Province, Correa joined San Lorenzo's youth setup in 2007, aged 12, after a trial period. In the summer of 2012, he was due to join Portuguese club Benfica on a free transfer, but the deal later collapsed.

Correa signed a four-year professional deal with the Ciclón on 23 September 2012, and was promoted to the first-team in January 2013. On 31 March he played his first match as a professional, coming on as a second-half substitute in a 0–1 loss at Newell's Old Boys.

On 11 May, Correa scored his first professional goal, netting the last of a 3–0 home success against Boca Juniors. He finished the campaign with 13 appearances (eight starts, 747 minutes of action), scoring four goals.

=== Atlético Madrid ===
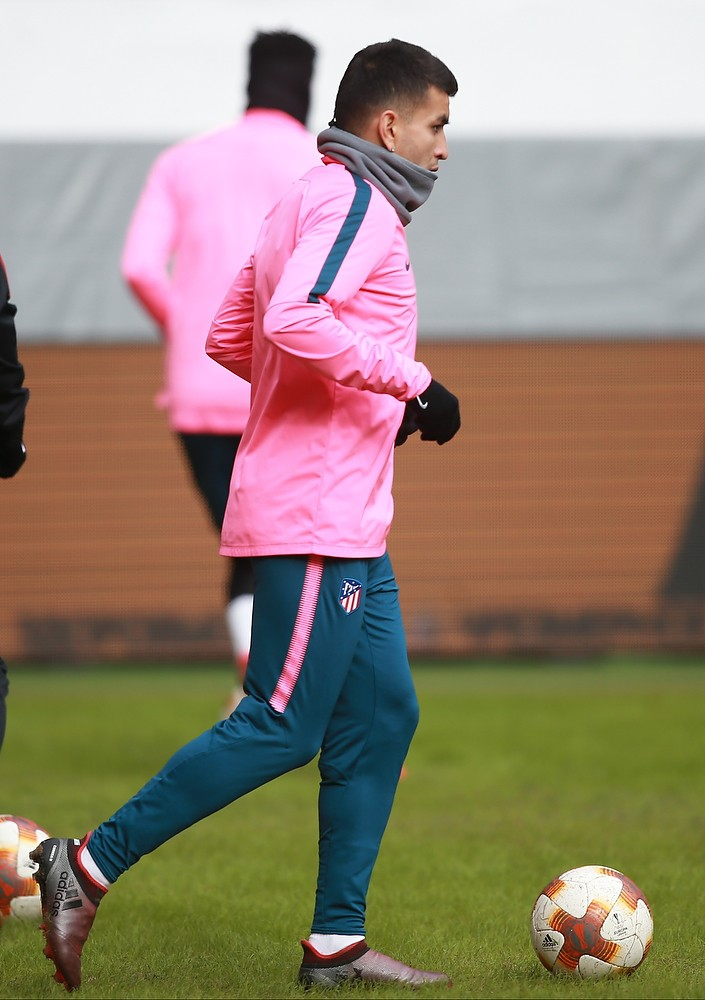
Correa with Atlético Madrid in 2018

On 27 May 2014, after scoring six goals in 2013–14, Correa had agreed a deal with La Liga holders Atlético Madrid for a reported fee of €7.5 million. He signed a five-year contract with the Madrid side, joining the club after the 2014 Copa Libertadores.

In June 2014, however, Correa was sidelined for six months due to a heart tumour. After undergoing surgery on 18 June in New York, he started a light training in August, and officially joined the club on 13 December.

On 22 August 2015, Correa finally made his Atleti debut, replacing Óliver Torres in a 1–0 home league match win against Las Palmas. He scored his first goal for the club on 19 September, netting the first in a 2–0 away win against Eibar; he also assisted Fernando Torres in the second goal.

On 6 November 2019, Correa marked his 200th appearance for Atlético, starting in a 1–2 away loss against Bayer Leverkusen. On 10 August, Atlético announced that Correa and teammate Šime Vrsaljko were both positive for COVID-19, ruling them out of the team's quarter-final fixture against RB Leipzig.

On 22 May 2021, Correa scored in Atlético's 2–1 win over Real Valladolid on the final day of the 2020–21 La Liga season to win the league title for the first time since 2014.

Correa started his 2021–22 La Liga season on the right foot, as he scored in consecutive matches against Celta Vigo and Elche to hand Atlético back-to-back wins.

=== Tigres UANL ===
In July 2025, Correa joined Mexican club Tigres UANL. He scored 23 goals and provided 14 assists in 54 appearances for the club during the 2025–26 season.

=== River Plate ===
On 24 July 2026, River Plate reached an agreement to sign Correa for a reported fee of US$19 million.

== International career ==
=== South American U-20 Championship selection ===
On 6 January 2015, Humberto Grondona, Under-20 Argentina Selection Technical Director, submitted a list of 32 Argentine players including Correa, invited to train to make the final roster for the South American Under-20s Championship. After four days of training Grondona announced the final 23-man roster that featured Correa as the captain of the Under-20 Argentine side.

On 14 January, Correa made his debut for Argentina U20 national football team against Ecuador in the first game of the group stage. He scored a goal and twice assisted to Giovanni Simeone for a 5–2 win.

On 18 January, Correa scored a goal during a 6–2 win against Peru, helping Argentina advance out of the group stage.

On 26 January, Argentina once again facing Peru in the playoff elimination stage of the tournament, Correa scored again during this matchup, helping Argentina advance to the final with a 2–0 win.

On 7 February, Argentina played against tournament host Uruguay in the U-20 South America Cup final. Throughout the game was a stalemate at 1–1, until Correa scored at the 81st minute to put Argentina up for 2–1 win for the U-20 South America Championship, and Correa earning honors for the Best Player of the Tournament.

=== U-20 World Cup selection ===
On 13 May 2015, Humberto Grondona confirmed the list of 21 football players including Correa to represent Argentina in the U-20 World Cup hosted by New Zealand. On 25 May, in the team's second last friendly before the U-20 World Cup competition, Correa scored a header from a corner set for a 3–1 loss against Tahiti.

On 30 May, during Argentina's opening match for the U-20 World Cup group stage against Panama, Correa scored both goals for Argentina for a 2–2 draw. Argentina only earned two points in the group stage meaning they failed to advance into the knockout round.

=== Senior team ===
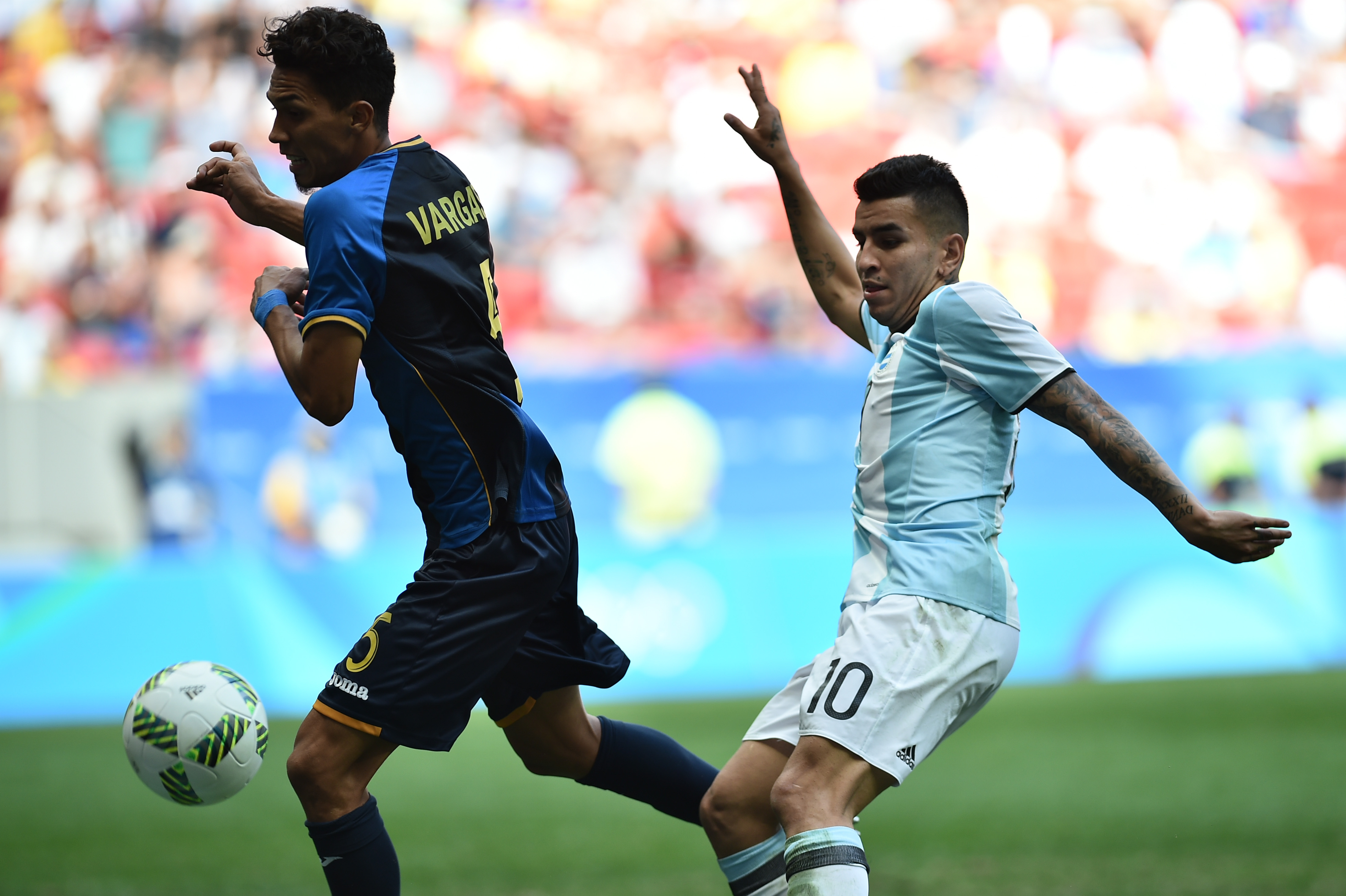
Correa playing for Argentina in 2016

On 4 September 2015, Correa made his full squad debut, coming on as a late substitute for Ezequiel Lavezzi in a friendly match against Bolivia, which ended in 7–0 victory. He scored the last goal of the match.

Correa was a member of the 2021 Copa América winning side, appearing twice in group stage matches against Bolivia and Paraguay.

On 17 November 2022, he received a late call up to the 2022 FIFA World Cup squad, as an emergency replacement for the injured Nicolás González. His only appearance in the tournament happened in the last minutes of the semi-final against Croatia to substitute Alexis Mac Allister during a 3–0 victory.

== Style of play ==
Correa has been compared to compatriot Sergio Agüero, due to his similar height. However, his playing style is more similar to Carlos Tevez, in a more attacking positional role. He holds good skill, pace and low centre of gravity, aside from a good technique and first touch.

== Career statistics ==
=== Club ===
As of match played 5 November 2026

Appearances and goals by club, season and competition
Club	Season	League			National cup (Note: Includes Copa Argentina, Copa del Rey)		Continental		Other		Total	
Club	Season	Division	Apps	Goals	Apps	Goals	Apps	Goals	Apps	Goals	Apps	Goals
San Lorenzo	2012–13	Argentine Primera División	12	4	5	0	2 (Note: Appearances in Copa Sudamericana)	0	—		19	4
San Lorenzo	2013–14	Argentine Primera División	35	6	0	0	9 (Note: Appearances in Copa Libertadores)	2	1 (Note: Appearance in Copa Campeonato)	0	45	8
San Lorenzo	Total		47	10	5	0	11	2	1	0	64	12
Atlético Madrid	2014–15	La Liga	0	0	0	0	0	0	—		0	0
Atlético Madrid	2015–16	La Liga	26	5	5	2	5 (Note: Appearances in UEFA Champions League)	1	—		36	8
Atlético Madrid	2016–17	La Liga	31	4	7	4	9	0	—		47	8
Atlético Madrid	2017–18	La Liga	37	8	4	0	15 (Note: Six appearances in UEFA Champions League, nine appearances and one goal in UEFA Europa League)	1	—		56	9
Atlético Madrid	2018–19	La Liga	36	3	4	2	8	0	1 (Note: Appearance in UEFA Super Cup)	0	49	5
Atlético Madrid	2019–20	La Liga	33	5	1	1	8	0	2 (Note: Appearance(s) in Supercopa de España)	1	44	7
Atlético Madrid	2020–21	La Liga	38	9	2	0	8	0	—		48	9
Atlético Madrid	2021–22	La Liga	36	12	2	0	10	1	1	0	49	13
Atlético Madrid	2022–23	La Liga	35	9	4	1	6	0	—		45	10
Atlético Madrid	2023–24	La Liga	32	9	4	1	10	1	1	0	47	11
Atlético Madrid	2024–25	La Liga	31	4	6	1	8	3	3 (Note: Appearances in FIFA Club World Cup)	0	48	8
Atlético Madrid	Total		335	68	39	12	87	7	8	1	469	88
Tigres UANL	2025–26	Liga MX	41	16	—		9 (Note: Appearances in CONCACAF Champions Cup)	2	4 (Note: Appearances in Leagues Cup)	5	54	23
River Plate	2026	Argentine Primera División	15	5	—		2	0	—		17	5
Career total			438	99	44	12	109	11	13	6	604	128

=== International ===
As of match played 5 June 2025

Appearances and goals by national team and year
National team	Year	Apps	Goals
Argentina	2015	3	1
Argentina	2016	4	0
Argentina	2017	1	0
Argentina	2018	2	0
Argentina	2019	2	1
Argentina	2020	0	0
Argentina	2021	6	1
Argentina	2022	5	0
Argentina	2023	1	0
Argentina	2024	1	0
Argentina	2025	3	0
Total		28	3

Scores and results list Argentina's goal tally first.

List of international goals scored by Ángel Correa
No.	Date	Venue	Opponent	Score	Result	Competition
1	4 September 2015	BBVA Compass Stadium, Houston, United States	Bolivia	7–0	7–0	Friendly
2	26 March 2019	Stade Ibn Batouta, Tangier, Morocco	Morocco	1–0	1–0	Friendly
3	2 September 2021	Estadio Olímpico de la UCV, Caracas, Venezuela	Venezuela	3–0	3–1	2022 FIFA World Cup qualification

== Honours ==
San Lorenzo

- Argentine Primera División: 2013 Inicial
- Copa Libertadores: 2014

Atlético Madrid

- La Liga: 2020–21
- UEFA Europa League: 2017–18
- UEFA Super Cup: 2018
- UEFA Champions League runner-up: 2015–16

Tigres UANL

- CONCACAF Champions Cup runner-up: 2026

Argentina U20

- South American U-20 Championship: 2015

Argentina

- FIFA World Cup: 2022
- Copa América: 2021

Individual

- La Liga Player of the Month: January 2022
- Leagues Cup top scorer: 2025
- Liga MX Best XI: Apertura 2025
- Liga MX top assist provider: Clausura 2026
