= 2013 South American U-17 Championship squads =

All the players had to be born after 1 January 1996.

Players name marked in bold have been capped at full international level.

== Argentina ==
Manager: Humberto Grondona

No.	Pos.	Player	Date of birth (age)	Caps	Goals	Club
1	GK	Augusto Batalla	30 April 1996 (aged 16)			(Argentine Football Association) River Plate
2	DF	**Emanuel Mammana**	10 February 1996 (aged 17)			(Argentine Football Association) River Plate
3	DF	Nicolás Pinto	22 January 1996 (aged 17)			(Argentine Football Association) Boca Juniors
4	DF	Nicolás Tripichio	5 January 1996 (aged 17)			(Argentine Football Association) Vélez Sársfield
5	MF	Germán Ferreyra	13 January 1996 (aged 17)			(Argentine Football Association) Vélez Sársfield
6	DF	Leandro Vega	27 May 1996 (aged 16)			(Argentine Football Association) River Plate
7	FW	Jonathan Cañete	12 July 1996 (aged 16)			(Argentine Football Association) Independiente
8	MF	Marcelo Storm	26 June 1996 (aged 16)			(Argentine Football Association) Vélez Sársfield
9	FW	Sebastián Driussi	9 February 1996 (aged 17)			(Argentine Football Association) River Plate
10	MF	Leonardo Suárez	30 March 1996 (aged 17)			(Argentine Football Association) Boca Juniors
11	FW	Marcos Astina	21 January 1996 (aged 17)			(Argentine Football Association) Lanús
12	GK	Axel Werner	28 February 1996 (aged 17)			(Argentine Football Association) Atlético de Rafaela
13	DF	**Fabricio Bustos**	28 April 1996 (aged 16)			(Argentine Football Association) Independiente
14	MF	Lucio Compagnucci	23 February 1996 (aged 17)			(Argentine Football Association) Vélez Sársfield
15	DF	Rodrigo Moreira	15 July 1996 (aged 16)			(Argentine Football Association) Independiente
16	MF	Zacarías Morán	22 February 1996 (aged 17)			(Argentine Football Association) River Plate
17	FW	Mauricio Del Castillo	10 March 1996 (aged 17)			(Argentine Football Association) Independiente
18	FW	Iván Leszczuk	20 February 1996 (aged 17)			(Argentine Football Association) Boca Juniors
19	FW	Franco Pérez	1 January 1996 (aged 17)			(Argentine Football Association) Newell's Old Boys
20	MF	Matías Sánchez	5 July 1996 (aged 16)			(Argentine Football Association) Chacarita Juniors
21	FW	Joaquín Ibañez	5 September 1996 (aged 16)			(Argentine Football Association) Lanús
22	FW	Matías Romero	1 February 1996 (aged 17)			(Argentine Football Association) Boca Juniors
23	GK	Fernando Benvenutti	5 March 1996 (aged 17)			(Argentine Football Association) Arsenal

== Bolivia ==
Manager: Freddy Bolívar

No.	Pos.	Player	Date of birth (age)	Caps	Goals	Club
1	GK	**Javier Rojas Iguaro**	14 January 1996 (aged 17)			(Bolivian Football Federation) Real Santa Cruz
2	DF	**Óscar Baldomar**	16 February 1996 (aged 17)			(Bolivian Football Federation) Escuela Adolfo Flores
3	DF	José Armando Flores	3 December 1997 (aged 15)			(Bolivian Football Federation) Callejas
4	DF	Omar Eduardo Paz	5 January 1996 (aged 17)			(Bolivian Football Federation) Florida
5	MF	Jeferson Virreira	19 January 1997 (aged 16)			(Bolivian Football Federation) Callejas
6	DF	**Joel Bejarano**	21 March 1996 (aged 17)			(Bolivian Football Federation) Florida
7	MF	Carlos Hugo Moreno	7 January 1997 (aged 16)			(Bolivian Football Federation) Blooming
8	MF	Michael Fernando Castellón	16 April 1996 (aged 16)			(Bolivian Football Federation) Jorge Wilstermann
9	FW	Saúl Aquino	23 April 1996 (aged 16)			(United States Soccer Federation) Barron Collier HS
10	MF	Ricardo Román	11 March 1996 (aged 17)			(French Football Federation) Lille
11	MF	**Carmelo Algarañaz**	27 January 1996 (aged 17)			(Bolivian Football Federation) Callejas
12	GK	Pablo Andrés Cortez	2 September 1996 (aged 16)			(Bolivian Football Federation) Florida
13	MF	Nicolás Andrés Landa	27 January 1996 (aged 17)			(Bolivian Football Federation) Bolívar
14	FW	Hernán Luis Rodríguez	9 May 1996 (aged 16)			(Bolivian Football Federation) The Strongest
15	DF	Alex Gabriel Rodriguez	10 July 1996 (aged 16)			(Bolivian Football Federation) Escuela Torito García
16	DF	Mauricio Chajtur	7 October 1997 (aged 15)			(Bolivian Football Federation) Canarios
17	MF	Kevin Alcántara	10 May 1996 (aged 16)			(Bolivian Football Federation) Bancruz Piraí
18	FW	Hugo Saucedo	12 February 1996 (aged 17)			(Bolivian Football Federation) Oriente Petrolero
19	FW	Kevin Claure Guzmán	26 October 1996 (aged 16)			(Bolivian Football Federation) Virginia USC
20	MF	Ruddy Esleytter Romero	20 December 1996 (aged 16)			(Bolivian Football Federation) Real América
21	FW	Christian Antonio Barrancos	26 January 1996 (aged 17)			(Bolivian Football Federation) Aurora
22	DF	Jesús Enrique Careaga	9 May 1997 (aged 15)			(Bolivian Football Federation) Oruro Royal
23	MF	**Moisés Villarroel Angúlo**	27 August 1998 (aged 14)			(Bolivian Football Federation) Blooming

== Brazil ==
Manager: Alexandre Gallo

No.	Pos.	Player	Date of birth (age)	Caps	Goals	Club
1	GK	Marcos Felipe	13 April 1996 (aged 16)			(Brazilian Football Confederation) Fluminense
2	DF	Jeferson	22 June 1996 (aged 16)			(Brazilian Football Confederation) Ponte Preta
3	DF	Lucão	23 March 1996 (aged 17)			(Brazilian Football Confederation) São Paulo
4	DF	Eduardo	13 February 1996 (aged 17)			(Brazilian Football Confederation) Internacional
5	MF	Gustavo Hebling	5 April 1996 (aged 16)			(Brazilian Football Confederation) São Paulo
6	DF	Abner	30 May 1996 (aged 16)			(Brazilian Football Confederation) Coritiba
7	MF	Robert	28 September 1996 (aged 16)			(Brazilian Football Confederation) Fluminense
8	MF	Gabriel Boschilia	5 March 1996 (aged 17)			(Brazilian Football Confederation) São Paulo
9	FW	Mosquito	6 January 1996 (aged 17)			(Brazilian Football Confederation) Atlético Paranaense
10	MF	Índio	28 February 1996 (aged 17)			(Brazilian Football Confederation) Vasco da Gama
11	FW	Kenedy	8 February 1996 (aged 17)			(Brazilian Football Confederation) Fluminense
12	GK	**Carlos Miguel Coronel**	29 December 1996 (aged 16)			(Brazilian Football Confederation) Red Bull Brasil
13	DF	Auro Jr.	23 January 1996 (aged 17)			(Brazilian Football Confederation) São Paulo
14	DF	Léo Mendes	15 February 1996 (aged 17)			(Brazilian Football Confederation) Internacional
15	DF	Lincoln	7 March 1996 (aged 17)			(Brazilian Football Confederation) Flamengo
16	DF	**Léo Pereira**	31 January 1996 (aged 17)			(Brazilian Football Confederation) Atlético Paranaense
17	DF	Matheus Oliveira	6 September 1996 (aged 16)			(Brazilian Football Confederation) Internacional
18	MF	**Arthur**	12 August 1996 (aged 16)			(Brazilian Football Confederation) Grêmio
19	MF	Thiago Maia	22 March 1997 (aged 16)			(Brazilian Football Confederation) Santos
20	FW	Caio Rangel	16 January 1996 (aged 17)			(Brazilian Football Confederation) Flamengo
21	MF	Ewandro	15 March 1996 (aged 17)			(Brazilian Football Confederation) São Paulo
22	GK	John	13 February 1996 (aged 17)			(Brazilian Football Confederation) Santos
23	FW	Alisson Farias	7 April 1996 (aged 16)			(Brazilian Football Confederation) Internacional

== Chile ==
Manager: Mariano Puyol

No.	Pos.	Player	Date of birth (age)	Caps	Goals	Club
1	GK	Miguel Angel Vargas	15 June 1996 (aged 16)			(Football Federation of Chile) Universidad Católica
2	DF	Dilan Zúñiga	26 July 1996 (aged 16)			(Football Federation of Chile) Colo-Colo
3	DF	**Sebastián Vegas**	4 December 1996 (aged 16)			(Football Federation of Chile) Audax Italiano
4	DF	**Benjamín Kuscevic**	2 May 1996 (aged 16)			(Football Federation of Chile) Universidad Católica
5	MF	Misael Cubillos	6 February 1996 (aged 17)			(Football Federation of Chile) Deportes Iquique
6	MF	Jorge Araya	25 March 1996 (aged 17)			(Football Federation of Chile) Colo-Colo
7	FW	Jaime Carreño	3 March 1997 (aged 16)			(Football Federation of Chile) Universidad Católica
8	MF	Kevin Medel	24 May 1996 (aged 16)			(Football Federation of Chile) Universidad Católica
9	FW	Sebastián Américo Gómez	9 January 1996 (aged 17)			(Football Federation of Chile) Universidad de Chile
10	FW	Luis Oyarzo	6 March 1996 (aged 17)			(Football Federation of Chile) Universidad Católica
11	FW	Matías Ramírez	5 February 1996 (aged 17)			(Football Federation of Chile) Palestino
12	GK	Luis Sotomayor	4 December 1996 (aged 16)			(Football Federation of Chile) Deportes Iquique
13	DF	Stefano Contreras	13 January 1996 (aged 17)			(Football Federation of Chile) Universidad de Chile
14	FW	Ian Leal	18 January 1996 (aged 17)			(Football Federation of Chile) Universidad de Chile
15	MF	Eduardo Navarrete	7 June 1996 (aged 16)			(Football Federation of Chile) Audax Italiano
16	MF	Sebastián Díaz	26 February 1996 (aged 17)			(Football Federation of Chile) Unión Temuco
17	MF	Franco Ortega	25 July 1996 (aged 16)			(Football Federation of Chile) Santiago Wanderers
18	MF	Carlos Lobos	21 February 1997 (aged 16)			(Football Federation of Chile) Universidad Católica
19	DF	Jordano Cisterna	2 February 1996 (aged 17)			(Football Federation of Chile) Everton
20	DF	Carlos Candia	22 August 1996 (aged 16)			(Football Federation of Chile) Universidad de Chile
21	MF	Bryan Carvallo	15 September 1996 (aged 16)			(Football Federation of Chile) Colo-Colo
22	DF	Dino Agote	30 April 1996 (aged 16)			(Football Federation of Chile) Universidad Católica
23	GK	Eryin Sanhueza	29 January 1996 (aged 17)			(Football Federation of Chile) Audax Italiano

== Colombia ==
Manager: Harold Rivera

No.	Pos.	Player	Date of birth (age)	Caps	Goals	Club
1	GK	Gustavo Sánchez	17 January 1996 (aged 17)			(Colombian Football Federation) Independiente Santa Fe
2	DF	Jefferson Gómez	22 June 1996 (aged 16)			(Colombian Football Federation) Envigado FC
3	DF	Juan Caicedo	12 April 1996 (aged 16)			(Colombian Football Federation) Boca Juniors de Cali
4	DF	Nilson Castrillon	28 January 1996 (aged 17)			(Colombian Football Federation) Deportivo Cali
5	DF	Jeison Angulo	27 June 1996 (aged 16)			(Colombian Football Federation) Deportivo Cali
6	MF	Andres Tello	6 September 1996 (aged 16)			(Colombian Football Federation) Envigado FC
7	MF	**Davinson Sánchez**	20 June 1996 (aged 16)			(Colombian Football Federation) Atlético Nacional
8	MF	Juan Alberto Mosquera	10 February 1996 (aged 17)			(Colombian Football Federation) Envigado FC
9	FW	Jhon Miranda	7 March 1996 (aged 17)			(Colombian Football Federation) Independiente Santa Fe
10	FW	Joao Rodríguez	12 May 1996 (aged 16)			(The Football Association) Chelsea FC
11	FW	Gustavo Torres	15 June 1996 (aged 16)			(Colombian Football Federation) Universitario de Popayán
12	GK	**Iván Arboleda**	21 April 1996 (aged 16)			(Colombian Football Federation) Deportivo Pasto
13	DF	Kevin Balanta	28 April 1996 (aged 16)			(Colombian Football Federation) Club Toritos
14	FW	**Marlos Moreno**	20 September 1996 (aged 16)			(Colombian Football Federation) Atlético Nacional
15	DF	Stefano Mosquera	25 January 1996 (aged 17)			(Colombian Football Federation) Boca Juniors de Cali
16	MF	Mateo Cardona	11 February 1996 (aged 17)			(Colombian Football Federation) Envigado FC
17	DF	Andrés Zuluaga	21 February 1996 (aged 17)			(Colombian Football Federation) Club Estudiantil
18	FW	Víctor Arboleda	1 October 1996 (aged 16)			(Colombian Football Federation) Deportivo Cali
19	FW	**Alfredo Morelos**	21 June 1996 (aged 16)			(Colombian Football Federation) Independiente Medellín
20	MF	Brayan Rovira	2 December 1996 (aged 16)			(Colombian Football Federation) Atlético Nacional
21	DF	Óscar Cabezas	22 December 1996 (aged 16)			(Colombian Football Federation) Club Juanito Moreno
22	GK	Luis Vásquez	1 March 1996 (aged 17)			(Colombian Football Federation) Independiente Medellín
23	MF	Kevin Caicedo	18 January 1996 (aged 17)			(Royal Spanish Football Federation) Atlético Madrid

== Ecuador ==
Manager: José Javier Rodríguez Mayorga

No.	Pos.	Player	Date of birth (age)	Caps	Goals	Club
1	GK	Xavier Cevallos	22 June 1996 (aged 16)			(Ecuadorian Football Federation) Emelec
2	DF	Edison Realpe	13 April 1996 (aged 16)			(Ecuadorian Football Federation) Clan Juvenil
3	DF	David Aníbal Mina	26 April 1996 (aged 16)			(Ecuadorian Football Federation) Independiente José Terán
4	DF	Anthony Bedoya	26 January 1996 (aged 17)			(Ecuadorian Football Federation) Academia Alfaro Moreno
5	DF	**Julio Joao Ortiz**	1 May 1996 (aged 16)			(Ecuadorian Football Federation) Universidad Católica
6	DF	Jonathan Cabezas	15 August 1996 (aged 16)			(Ecuadorian Football Federation) Independiente José Terán
7	MF	Abel Casquete	8 August 1997 (aged 15)			(Argentine Football Association) River Plate
8	MF	Jonathan Cevallos	20 September 1996 (aged 16)			(Ecuadorian Football Federation) El Nacional
9	FW	Daniel Porozo	20 September 1997 (aged 15)			(Ecuadorian Football Federation) Universidad Católica
10	MF	Jhon Jairo Rodríguez	26 September 1996 (aged 16)			(Ecuadorian Football Federation) LDU Quito
11	FW	Luis Andrés Moreira	20 June 1996 (aged 16)			(Ecuadorian Football Federation) Barcelona
12	GK	Édisson Recalde	16 January 1996 (aged 17)			(Ecuadorian Football Federation) Imbabura
13	MF	Luis Enrique Becerra	30 January 1996 (aged 17)			(Ecuadorian Football Federation) River Plate Ecuador
14	MF	**Jhegson Méndez**	26 April 1997 (aged 15)			(Ecuadorian Football Federation) Independiente José Terán
15	MF	**Jefferson Intriago**	4 June 1996 (aged 16)			(Ecuadorian Football Federation) LDU Quito
16	FW	Joffre Andrés Escobar	24 October 1996 (aged 16)			(Ecuadorian Football Federation) Deportivo Cuenca
17	FW	Andrés Wilter Ayoví	17 April 1997 (aged 15)			(Ecuadorian Football Federation) Independiente José Terán
18	DF	Raúl Unda	29 February 1996 (aged 17)			(Ecuadorian Football Federation) LDU Quito
19	FW	Víctor Hugo Mina	22 April 1996 (aged 16)			(Ecuadorian Football Federation) Universidad Católica
20	FW	Alfredo Cabezas	20 March 1997 (aged 16)			(Ecuadorian Football Federation) Independiente José Terán
21	MF	Ángel Castillo	17 September 1997 (aged 15)			(Ecuadorian Football Federation) LDU Quito
22	GK	Ángelo Alain García	18 February 1996 (aged 17)			(Ecuadorian Football Federation) Barcelona
23	DF	Alexander Quiñónez	14 March 1996 (aged 17)			(Ecuadorian Football Federation) LDU Quito

== Paraguay ==
Manager: Hugo Caballero

No.	Pos.	Player	Date of birth (age)	Caps	Goals	Club
1	GK	Tomás Echagüe	18 September 1996 (aged 16)			(Paraguayan Football Association) Sportivo Luqueño
2	DF	Renzo Tandi	8 February 1996 (aged 17)			(Paraguayan Football Association) Cerro Porteño
3	DF	Ángel Almirón	5 February 1996 (aged 17)			(Paraguayan Football Association) Nacional
4	DF	Diego Marín	25 February 1996 (aged 17)			(Paraguayan Football Association) Libertad
5	DF	José Sanabria	25 March 1996 (aged 17)			(Paraguayan Football Association) Libertad
6	MF	Ángel Benítez	21 July 1996 (aged 16)			(Paraguayan Football Association) Libertad
7	FW	**Antonio Sanabria**	4 March 1996 (aged 17)	1	1	(Royal Spanish Football Federation) Barcelona
8	MF	Claudio Garay	9 February 1996 (aged 17)			(Paraguayan Football Association) Sol de América
9	FW	Aldo Torres	5 March 1996 (aged 17)			(Paraguayan Football Association) Guaraní
10	MF	**Jesús Medina**	30 April 1997 (aged 15)	1		(Paraguayan Football Association) Libertad
11	FW	Christian Vargas	3 June 1996 (aged 16)			(Paraguayan Football Association) Sol de América
12	GK	Francisco Ferreira	7 July 1996 (aged 16)			(Paraguayan Football Association) Sol de América
13	MF	Christian Arce	10 February 1997 (aged 16)			(Paraguayan Football Association) Cerro Porteño
14	DF	José Cañete	19 March 1996 (aged 17)			(Paraguayan Football Association) Olimpia
15	MF	Danilo Coronel	8 February 1996 (aged 17)			(Paraguayan Football Association) Cerro Porteño
16	MF	Alejandro Sosa	5 January 1996 (aged 17)			(Paraguayan Football Association) Guaraní
17	DF	**Omar Alderete**	26 December 1996 (aged 16)			(Paraguayan Football Association) Cerro Porteño
18	MF	Carlos Patiño	13 September 1996 (aged 16)			(Paraguayan Football Association) Libertad
19	MF	Santiago López	13 March 1996 (aged 17)			(Paraguayan Football Association) Cerro Porteño
20	FW	Alex Cáceres	1 February 1996 (aged 17)			(Paraguayan Football Association) Guaraní
21	FW	**Ronaldo Martínez**	25 April 1996 (aged 16)			(Paraguayan Football Association) Cerro Porteño
22	GK	Ever Mereles	6 April 1997 (aged 15)			(Paraguayan Football Association) Libertad
23	FW	Jorge Colmán	12 December 1997 (aged 15)			(Paraguayan Football Association) Olimpia

== Peru ==
Manager: Edgar Teixeira

No.	Pos.	Player	Date of birth (age)	Caps	Goals	Club
1	GK	Juniors Barbieri	20 January 1996 (aged 17)			(Peruvian Football Federation) Sporting Cristal
2	DF	**Luis Abram**	27 February 1996 (aged 17)			(Peruvian Football Federation) Regatas Lima
3	DF	Luis Rivas	5 January 1996 (aged 17)			(Peruvian Football Federation) Academia Cantolao
4	DF	César Hernández	5 February 1996 (aged 17)			(Peruvian Football Federation) Sport Victoria
5	DF	Francisco Duclós	29 January 1996 (aged 17)			(Peruvian Football Federation) Alianza Lima
6	DF	Henry Vega	22 January 1996 (aged 17)			(Peruvian Football Federation) Sporting Cristal
7	FW	**Beto da Silva**	28 December 1996 (aged 16)			(Peruvian Football Federation) Sporting Cristal
8	MF	**Renzo Garcés**	12 June 1996 (aged 16)			(Peruvian Football Federation) Universidad San Martín
9	FW	Dangelo Artiaga	15 June 1996 (aged 16)			(Peruvian Football Federation) Universidad San Martín
10	FW	Yamir Oliva	17 January 1996 (aged 17)			(Peruvian Football Federation) Sporting Cristal
11	FW	Roberto Siucho	7 February 1997 (aged 16)			(Peruvian Football Federation) Universitario
12	GK	Ítalo Espinoza	17 April 1996 (aged 16)			(Peruvian Football Federation) Universidad San Martín
13	DF	Diego Zurek	25 May 1996 (aged 16)			(Peruvian Football Federation) Universidad San Martín
14	DF	Camilo Jiménez	2 July 1996 (aged 16)			(Peruvian Football Federation) Universidad San Martín
15	MF	Julio Cabellos	10 February 1996 (aged 17)			(Peruvian Football Federation) Universidad San Martín
16	MF	Claudio Namoc	19 July 1996 (aged 16)			(Peruvian Football Federation) Esther Grande
17	FW	Jhon Barrueta	11 February 1996 (aged 17)			(Peruvian Football Federation) Esther Grande
18	MF	Leonardo Mendoza	27 May 1996 (aged 16)			(Peruvian Football Federation) Academia Cantolao
19	MF	**Adrián Ugarriza**	1 January 1997 (aged 16)			(Peruvian Football Federation) Universidad San Martín
20	MF	Enmanuel Paucar	9 August 1996 (aged 16)			(Peruvian Football Federation) Esther Grande
21	DF	Junior Morales	22 June 1996 (aged 16)			(Peruvian Football Federation) Esther Grande
22	GK	Patricio Torres	15 January 1996 (aged 17)			(Peruvian Football Federation) Esther Grande
23	FW	Carlos Orbegoso	16 January 1996 (aged 17)			(Peruvian Football Federation) Universidad San Marcos

== Uruguay ==
Manager: Fabián Coito

No.	Pos.	Player	Date of birth (age)	Caps	Goals	Club
1	GK	Thiago Gastón Cardozo	31 July 1996 (aged 16)			(Uruguayan Football Association) Peñarol
2	DF	Joel Bregonis	23 January 1996 (aged 17)			(Uruguayan Football Association) Nacional
3	DF	Fabrizio Buschiazzo	7 July 1996 (aged 16)			(Uruguayan Football Association) Peñarol
4	DF	Darwin Ávila	10 April 1996 (aged 16)			(Uruguayan Football Association) Peñarol
5	MF	Facundo Ospitaleche	11 April 1996 (aged 16)			(Uruguayan Football Association) Defensor Sporting
6	DF	Aldo Martilotta	20 February 1996 (aged 17)			(Uruguayan Football Association) Danubio
7	FW	Gonzalo Latorre	26 April 1996 (aged 16)			(Uruguayan Football Association) Peñarol
8	MF	Franco Pizzichillo	3 January 1996 (aged 17)			(Uruguayan Football Association) Defensor Sporting
9	FW	Francis D'Albenas	11 January 1996 (aged 17)			(Uruguayan Football Association) River Plate
10	FW	Kevin Méndez	10 January 1996 (aged 17)			(Uruguayan Football Association) Peñarol
11	FW	Maicol Gabriel Cabrera	11 May 1996 (aged 16)			(Uruguayan Football Association) Nacional
12	GK	Facundo Silva	4 July 1996 (aged 16)			(Uruguayan Football Association) Danubio
13	MF	Jhon Pintos	14 January 1996 (aged 17)			(Uruguayan Football Association) Liverpool
14	DF	José Etcheverry	10 May 1996 (aged 16)			(Uruguayan Football Association) Defensor Sporting
15	MF	Gastón Faber	21 April 1996 (aged 16)			(Uruguayan Football Association) Danubio
16	MF	Elías González	29 October 1996 (aged 16)			(Uruguayan Football Association) River Plate
17	DF	Pablo Matías González	13 September 1996 (aged 16)			(Uruguayan Football Association) Liverpool
18	FW	Marcio Benítez	3 June 1996 (aged 16)			(Uruguayan Football Association) Nacional
19	FW	Federico Nicolás Tabeira	8 February 1996 (aged 17)			(Uruguayan Football Association) Atenas
20	MF	Wesley Damián Costa	29 January 1996 (aged 17)			(Uruguayan Football Association) Peñarol
21	FW	Franco Acosta	5 March 1996 (aged 17)			(Uruguayan Football Association) Fénix
22	DF	Emanuel González	12 January 1996 (aged 17)			(Uruguayan Football Association) Liverpool
23	GK	Kevin Larrea	19 April 1996 (aged 16)			(Uruguayan Football Association) Defensor Sporting

== Venezuela ==
Manager: Rafael Dudamel

No.	Pos.	Player	Date of birth (age)	Caps	Goals	Club
1	GK	Pedro Rafael Ramos	28 February 1996 (aged 17)			(Venezuelan Football Federation) Caracas
2	GK	Enmis Rodríguez	4 July 1996 (aged 16)			(Venezuelan Football Federation) Carabobo
3	MF	Carlos Victora	10 September 1996 (aged 17)			(Venezuelan Football Federation) Carabobo
4	DF	José Marrufo	12 May 1996 (aged 16)			(Venezuelan Football Federation) Caracas
5	MF	Andrés Leonardo Benítez	22 March 1996 (aged 17)			(Venezuelan Football Federation) Trujillanos
6	DF	Franko Díaz	6 February 1996 (aged 17)			(Venezuelan Football Federation) Deportivo Lara
7	FW	Ronaldo Peña	10 March 1997 (aged 16)			(Venezuelan Football Federation) Caracas
8	MF	Eduardo José Maceira	30 April 1996 (aged 16)			(Venezuelan Football Federation) Real Esppor
9	FW	**Andrés Ponce**	11 November 1996 (aged 16)			(Venezuelan Football Federation) Deportivo Táchira
10	MF	David Alejandro Zalzman	4 March 1996 (aged 17)			(Venezuelan Football Federation) Deportivo Anzoátegui
11	MF	Luis Rodríguez	23 January 1996 (aged 17)			(Mexican Football Federation) San Luis
12	GK	Beycker Velásquez	6 October 1996 (aged 16)			(Venezuelan Football Federation) Caracas
13	MF	José Hernández	26 June 1997 (aged 15)			(Venezuelan Football Federation) Caracas
14	MF	**Francisco La Mantia**	24 February 1996 (aged 17)			(Venezuelan Football Federation) Estudiantes de Mérida
15	FW	José Caraballo	22 February 1996 (aged 17)			(Venezuelan Football Federation) Caracas
16	MF	Samuel Marquina	7 June 1996 (aged 16)			(Royal Spanish Football Federation) Lleida Esportiu
17	MF	Jhony Fernando Camacho	1 August 1996 (aged 16)			(Venezuelan Football Federation) Deportivo Petare
18	MF	Leomar Pinto	17 March 1997 (aged 16)			(Venezuelan Football Federation) Caracas
19	FW	José Nicolás Marquez	21 February 1996 (aged 17)			(Venezuelan Football Federation) Estudiantes de Mérida
20	MF	Douglas Martínez	10 July 1996 (aged 16)			(Venezuelan Football Federation) Yaracuyanos
21	DF	**Diego Osio**	3 January 1997 (aged 16)			(Venezuelan Football Federation) CIV Valencia
22	DF	Jorge Ruiz	22 April 1996 (aged 16)			(Venezuelan Football Federation) Deportivo La Guaira
23	GK	Pedro Ramos	26 February 1996 (aged 17)			(Venezuelan Football Federation) Caracas
