= 2013 South American U-17 Championship =

Campeonato Sudamericano Sub-17 Argentina 2013

Tournament details
- Host country: Argentina
- Dates: 2–28 April
- Teams: 10 (from 1 confederation)
- Venues: 2 (in 2 host cities)

Final positions
- Champions: Argentina (3rd title)
- Runners-up: Venezuela
- Third place: Brazil
- Fourth place: Uruguay

Tournament statistics
- Matches played: 35
- Goals scored: 92 (2.63 per match)
- Top scorer(s): (Uruguay) Franco Acosta (8 goals)

The 2013 South American Under-17 Football Championship (Spanish: Campeonato Sudamericano Sub-17 Argentina 2013) was the 15th U-17 tournament for national teams affiliated with CONMEBOL. It was held in Argentina.

This tournament gave four berths to the 2013 FIFA U-17 World Cup, which was held in United Arab Emirates.

== Choice and background ==
Argentina was chosen as host country, as agreed at a meeting of the executive committee of CONMEBOL on 18 March 2011 at the headquarters of South American football being located in Luque, Paraguay. The meeting lasted about 3 hours and during that time it was decided to have Argentina as the headquarters for both the 2013 South American U-17 and U-20 Tournaments in 2013.

== Teams ==
- Argentina (hosts)
- Bolivia
- Brazil (holders)
- Chile
- Colombia
- Ecuador
- Paraguay
- Peru
- Uruguay
- Venezuela

== Venues ==
A total of two cities hosted the tournament.

Mendoza	2013 South American U-17 Championship is located in Argentina
Estadio Malvinas Argentinas	2013 South American U-17 Championship is located in Argentina
Capacity: 40,268	2013 South American U-17 Championship is located in Argentina
San Luis	2013 South American U-17 Championship is located in Argentina
Estadio Provincial Juan Gilberto Funes	2013 South American U-17 Championship is located in Argentina
Capacity: 15,000	2013 South American U-17 Championship is located in Argentina

== Match officials ==
The list of referees selected for the tournament was announced on 9 March 2013 by CONMEBOL's Referee Commission. The referees were:

(Argentina) Germán Delfino
(Argentina) Silvio Trucco

Assistant: Gustavo Rossi

(Bolivia) José Jordán

Assistant: Wilson Arellano

(Brazil) Péricles Cortez
(Brazil) Paulo César de Oliveira

Assistant: Fabrício Vilarinho

(Chile) Julio Bascuñán
(Chile) Carlos Ulloa

Assistant: Raúl Orellana
Assistant: Juan Maturana^{1}

(Colombia) Adrián Vélez

Assistant: Alexander Guzmán

(Ecuador) Roddy Zambrano

Assistant: Luis Vera

(Paraguay) Ulises Mereles

Assistant: Juan Zorrilla

(Peru) Diego Haro

Assistant: Braulio Cornejo

(Uruguay) Fernando Falce

Assistant: Gabriel Popovits

(Venezuela) José Argote
(Venezuela) Marlon Escalante

Assistant: Luis Murillo

1.Included in Final Stage.

== First stage ==
When teams finished level on points, the final order was determined according to:

1. superior goal difference in all matches
2. greater number of goals scored in all group matches
3. better result in matches between the tied teams
4. drawing of lots

=== Group A ===
Team	Pld	W	D	L	GF	GA	GD	Pts	Qualification
Paraguay	4	2	2	0	7	2	+5	8	Advanced to final stage
Argentina	4	2	0	2	7	7	0	6	Advanced to final stage
Venezuela	4	1	2	1	1	3	−2	5	Advanced to final stage
Ecuador	4	1	1	2	2	4	−2	4	
Colombia	4	0	3	1	3	4	−1	3	

Venue: Estadio Provincial Juan Gilberto Funes, San Luis

2 April 2013
17:05

Paraguay	1–1	Colombia
Medina 60'	Report	Torres 63'

Referee: Fernando Falce, Uruguay
2 April 2013
19:10

Argentina	0–2	Ecuador
	Report	Porozo 43'; Vega 51' (o.g.)

Referee: Paulo César de Oliveira, Brazil

4 April 2013
17:05

Ecuador	0–1	Venezuela
	Report	Ponce 16'

Referee: José Jordán, Bolivia
4 April 2013
19:10

Argentina	1–3	Paraguay
López 11' (o.g.)	Report	A. Sanabria 10', 30'; Cáceres 90+1'

Referee: Julio Bascuñán, Chile

6 April 2013
17:05

Argentina	3–0	Venezuela
Driussi 4', 63'; Sánchez 15'	Report

Referee: Diego Haro, Peru
6 April 2013
19:10

Ecuador	0–0	Colombia
	Report

Referee: Péricles Cortez, Brazil

8 April 2013
17:05

Paraguay	3–0	Ecuador
Medina 50', 83'; A. Sanabria 53'	Report

Referee: Carlos Ulloa, Chile
8 April 2013
19:10

Colombia	0–0	Venezuela
	Report

Referee: Fernando Falce, Uruguay

10 April 2013
17:05

Paraguay	0–0	Venezuela
	Report

Referee: Péricles Cortez, Brazil
10 April 2013
19:10

Argentina	3–2	Colombia
Vega 13'; Pérez 41'; Leszczuk 61'	Report	Rodríguez 50'; Moreno 85'

Referee: José Jordán, Bolivia

=== Group B ===
Team	Pld	W	D	L	GF	GA	GD	Pts	Qualification
Brazil	4	3	1	0	8	2	+6	10	Advanced to final stage
Uruguay	4	2	2	0	9	3	+6	8	Advanced to final stage
Peru	4	1	1	2	2	6	−4	4	Advanced to final stage
Chile	4	0	3	1	3	4	−1	3	
Bolivia	4	0	1	3	3	10	−7	1	

Venue: Estadio Malvinas Argentinas, Mendoza

3 April 2013
17:05

Uruguay	2–0	Peru
Buschiazzo 22'; K. Méndez 90+1'	Report

Referee: Ulises Mereles, Paraguay
3 April 2013
19:10

Brazil	1–0	Chile
Kenedy 24'	Report

Referee: Adrián Vélez, Colombia

5 April 2013
17:05

Chile	1–1	Bolivia
Carvallo 86'	Report	Algarañaz 58'

Referee: José Argote, Venezuela
5 April 2013
19:10

Brazil	1–1	Uruguay
Mosquito 52'	Report	Latorre 42'

Referee: Germán Delfino, Argentina

7 April 2013
17:05

Uruguay	1–1	Chile
Latorre 1'	Report	Vegas 42'

Referee: Marlon Escalante, Venezuela
7 April 2013
19:10

Peru	1–0	Bolivia
Artiaga 64'	Report

Referee: Silvio Trucco, Argentina

9 April 2013
19:00

Chile	1–1	Peru
Medel 90+2' (pen.)	Report	Garcés 59'

Referee: Ulises Mereles, Paraguay
9 April 2013
21:00

Brazil	3–1	Bolivia
Boschilia 49'; Kenedy 73'; Abner 83'	Report	Flores 44'

Referee: Roddy Zambrano, Ecuador

11 April 2013
17:05

Uruguay	5–1	Bolivia
K. Méndez 8'; Acosta 34', 38', 48'; Pizzichillo 57'	Report	Aquino 71'

Referee: Adrián Vélez, Colombia
11 April 2013
19:10

Brazil	3–0	Peru
Lincoln 29'; Caio Rangel 46'; Kenedy 71'	Report

Referee: Silvio Trucco, Argentina

== Final stage ==
Team	Pld	W	D	L	GF	GA	GD	Pts	Qualification
Argentina	5	2	3	0	10	6	+4	9	Qualified for 2013 FIFA U-17 World Cup
Venezuela	5	2	3	0	7	5	+2	9	Qualified for 2013 FIFA U-17 World Cup
Brazil	5	2	3	0	6	4	+2	9	Qualified for 2013 FIFA U-17 World Cup
Uruguay	5	2	2	1	11	9	+2	8	Qualified for 2013 FIFA U-17 World Cup
Paraguay	5	1	1	3	7	10	−3	4	
Peru	5	0	0	5	6	13	−7	0	

Venue: Estadio Provincial Juan Gilberto Funes, San Luis

14 April 2013
15:00

Brazil	1–0	Uruguay
Mosquito 21'	Report

Referee: Julio Bascuñán, Chile
14 April 2013
17:05

Paraguay	0–1	Venezuela
	Report	Ponce 54'

Referee: Germán Delfino, Argentina
14 April 2013
19:10

Argentina	2–0	Peru
Pérez 42'; Sánchez 51'	Report

Referee: Roddy Zambrano, Ecuador

17 April 2013
15:00

Paraguay	3–1	Peru
A. Sanabria 54'; Medina 65'; J. Sanabria 90+1'	Report	Garcés 72'

Referee: José Jordán, Bolivia
17 April 2013
17:05

Brazil	1–1	Venezuela
Boschilia 26'	Report	Ponce 74' (pen.)

Referee: Carlos Ulloa, Chile
17 April 2013
19:10

Argentina	3–3	Uruguay
Driussi 3', 12'; Storm 89'	Report	Benítez 45+3'; Acosta 46'; K. Méndez 75'

Referee: Adrián Vélez, Colombia

21 April 2013
15:00

Venezuela	2–1	Peru
Ponce 58', 75'	Report	da Silva 34'

Referee: Germán Delfino, Argentina
21 April 2013
17:05

Paraguay	1–3	Uruguay
A. Sanabria 69'	Report	Benítez 1'; K. Méndez 9'; Acosta 17'

Referee: Paulo César de Oliveira, Brazil
21 April 2013
19:10

Brazil	0–0	Argentina
	Report

Referee: Marlon Escalante, Venezuela

24 April 2013
15:00

Venezuela	1–1	Uruguay
Ponce 81'	Report	Acosta 41'

Referee: José Jordán, Bolivia
24 April 2013
17:05

Brazil	2–1	Peru
Kenedy 53'; Ewandro 85'	Report	Garcés 90'

Referee: Julio Bascuñán, Chile
24 April 2013
19:10

Paraguay	1–3	Argentina
López 89'	Report	Leszczuk 25'; Driussi 33'; Astina 40' (pen.)

Referee: Carlos Ulloa, Chile

28 April 2013
15:00

Paraguay	2–2	Brazil
Martínez 19'; A. Sanabria 90+2'	Report	Kenedy 33', 79'

Referee: Adrián Vélez, Colombia
28 April 2013
17:05

Uruguay	4–3	Peru
Acosta 4', 30'; Pizzichillo 18', 66'	Report	da Silva 20', 64'; Artiaga 69'

Referee: Carlos Ulloa, Chile
28 April 2013
19:10

Argentina	2–2	Venezuela
Suárez 20', 73'	Report	Ponce 16'; Peña 90'

Referee: Roddy Zambrano, Ecuador

== Winners ==
2013 South American Under-17 Football champions

Argentina
Third title

== Goalscorers ==
8 goals

- (Uruguay) Franco Acosta

7 goals

- (Venezuela) Andrés Ponce

6 goals

- (Brazil) Kenedy
- (Paraguay) Antonio Sanabria

5 goals

- (Argentina) Sebastián Driussi

4 goals

- (Paraguay) Jesús Medina
- (Uruguay) Alan Kevin Méndez

3 goals

- (Peru) Beto da Silva
- (Peru) Renzo Garcés
- (Uruguay) Franco Nicolás Pizzichillo

2 goals

- (Argentina) Iván Leszczuk
- (Argentina) Franco Pérez
- (Argentina) Matías Sánchez
- (Argentina) Leonardo Suárez
- (Brazil) Boschilia
- (Brazil) Mosquito
- (Peru) Dangelo Artiaga
- (Uruguay) Marcio Benítez
- (Uruguay) Gonzalo Latorre

1 goal

- (Argentina) Marcos Astina
- (Argentina) Marcelo Storm
- (Argentina) Leandro Vega
- (Bolivia) Carmelo Algarañaz
- (Bolivia) Saúl Aquino
- (Bolivia) José Armando Flores
- (Brazil) Abner
- (Brazil) Caio Rangel
- (Brazil) Ewandro
- (Brazil) Lincoln
- (Chile) Bryan Carvallo
- (Chile) Kevin Medel
- (Chile) Sebastián Vegas
- (Colombia) Marlos Moreno
- (Colombia) Joao Rodríguez
- (Colombia) Gustavo Torres
- (Ecuador) Daniel Porozo
- (Paraguay) Alex Cáceres
- (Paraguay) Santiago López
- (Paraguay) Ronaldo Martínez
- (Paraguay) José Sanabria
- (Uruguay) Fabrizio Buschiazzo
- (Venezuela) Ronaldo Peña

Own goals

- (Argentina) Leandro Vega (playing against Ecuador)
- (Paraguay) Santiago López (playing against Argentina)

== See also ==
- 2013 FIFA U-17 World Cup
