= Matías Ramírez =

Matías Ramírez may refer to:

- Matías Ramírez (footballer, born 1996), Chilean forward
- Matías Ramírez (footballer, born 1999), Argentine forward
