= Buschiazzo =

Buschiazzo is a surname. Notable people with the surname include:

- Fabrizio Buschiazzo (born 1996), Uruguayan footballer
- Juan Antonio Buschiazzo (1845–1917), Italian-born Argentine architect and engineer
- Maria Esther Buschiazzo (1889–1971), Argentine actress
