= Neymar (disambiguation) =

Neymar (born 1992) is a Brazilian footballer.

Neymar may also refer to:

- Neymar Sánchez (born 2003), Colombian footballer
- Neymar (song), 2018 single by Capital Bra
- Neymar: The Perfect Chaos, 2022 Netflix documentary series
- Neymar (film), 2023 Indian Malayalam-language film

== See also ==
- Neyma (born 1979), Mozambican singer
