= Matheus Oliveira =

Matheus Oliveira may refer to:

- Matheus Oliveira (footballer, born 1996), Brazilian football defender
- Matheus Oliveira (footballer, born 1997), Brazilian football attacking midfielder

== See also ==
- Mateus Oliveira (disambiguation)
