= La Guayacana =

- Location in Nariño and Colombia La Guayacana (Colombia)
- Coordinates: 1°24′52.6″N 78°26′14.6″W
- Country: Colombia
- Department: Nariño
- Municipality: Tumaco municipality
- Elevation: 741 ft (226 m)

Population (2005)
  - Total: 2,610
- Time zone: UTC-5 (Colombia Standard Time)

La Guayacana is a town in Tumaco Municipality, Nariño Department in Colombia.

== Climate ==
La Guayacana has a very wet tropical rainforest climate (Af).

Climate data for La Guayacana
Month	Jan	Feb	Mar	Apr	May	Jun	Jul	Aug	Sep	Oct	Nov	Dec	Year
Mean daily maximum °C (°F)	28.5 (83.3)	28.9 (84.0)	29.2 (84.6)	29.3 (84.7)	28.9 (84.0)	28.6 (83.5)	28.6 (83.5)	28.4 (83.1)	28.4 (83.1)	28.3 (82.9)	28.2 (82.8)	28.2 (82.8)	28.6 (83.5)
Daily mean °C (°F)	24.6 (76.3)	24.9 (76.8)	25.2 (77.4)	25.3 (77.5)	25.1 (77.2)	24.7 (76.5)	24.6 (76.3)	24.5 (76.1)	24.6 (76.3)	24.6 (76.3)	24.5 (76.1)	24.5 (76.1)	24.8 (76.6)
Mean daily minimum °C (°F)	20.8 (69.4)	21.0 (69.8)	21.3 (70.3)	21.3 (70.3)	21.3 (70.3)	20.9 (69.6)	20.7 (69.3)	20.7 (69.3)	20.8 (69.4)	20.9 (69.6)	20.8 (69.4)	20.9 (69.6)	21.0 (69.7)
Average rainfall mm (inches)	450.1 (17.72)	424.8 (16.72)	486.6 (19.16)	571.3 (22.49)	641.7 (25.26)	552.6 (21.76)	480.5 (18.92)	367.9 (14.48)	368.9 (14.52)	350.6 (13.80)	253.0 (9.96)	355.6 (14.00)	5,303.6 (208.79)
Average rainy days	25	22	23	25	26	25	24	22	23	22	19	23	279
Source 1:
Source 2:
