= Domingo González (footballer) =

Colombian footballer (1947–1979)

Personal information
- Date of birth: 24 December 1947
- Place of birth: Tumaco, Colombia
- Date of death: 16 July 1979 (aged 31)
- Place of death: Colombia
- Position: Midfielder

Senior career*
Years	Team	Apps	(Gls)
- Independiente Santa Fe
- * Club domestic league appearances and goals

Domingo González (24 December 1947 – 16 July 1979) was a Colombian footballer who competed in the 1972 Summer Olympics.

== Career ==
Born in Tumaco, González played as a midfielder for Santa Fe. He won the Colombian league with the club in 1971. He also played for Independiente Medellín, Deportes Quindío, Cúcuta Deportivo, Once Caldas and Deportes Tolima.

== Personal ==
González died in a bus accident.
