= Óscar Cabezas =

Colombian footballer (born 1996)

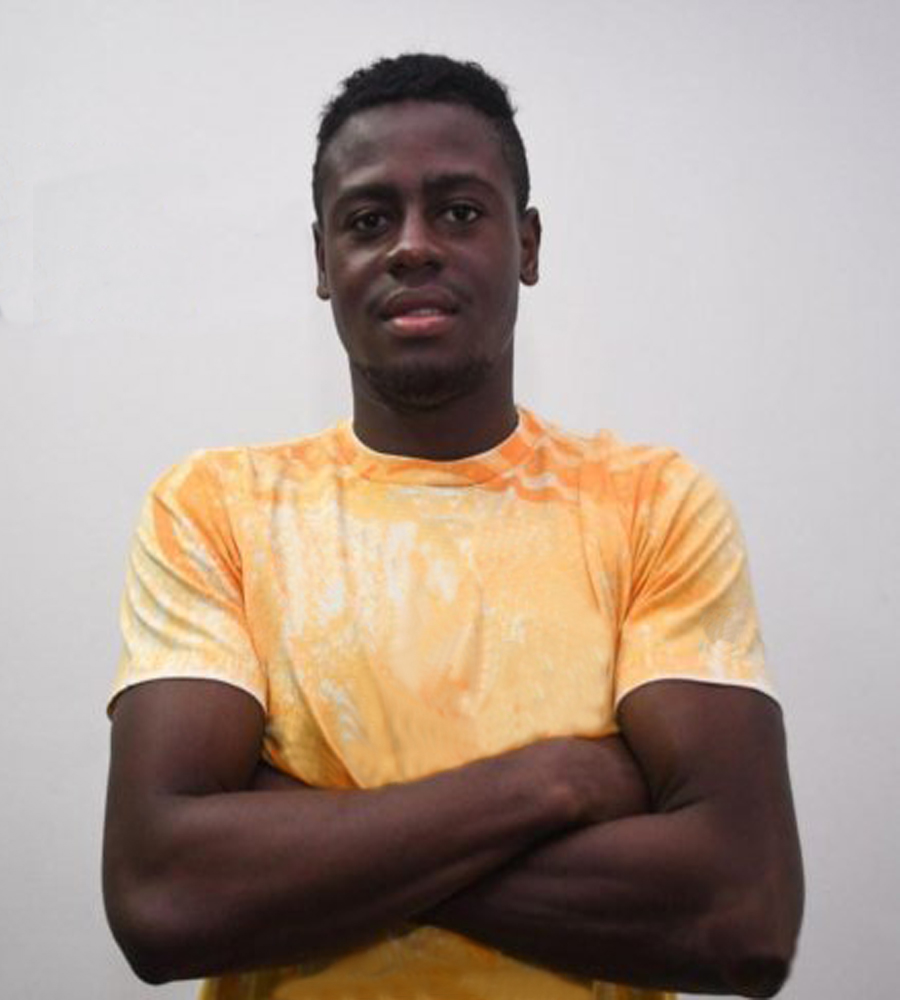

Personal information
- Full name: Óscar Eduardo Cabezas Segura
- Date of birth: 22 December 1996 (age 29)
- Place of birth: Tumaco, Colombia
- Height: 1.77 m (5 ft 10 in)
- Position: Centre-back

Team information
- Current team: Llaneros
- Number: 26

Youth career
- Club Juanito Moreno
- Atlético Paranaense

Senior career*
Years	Team	Apps	(Gls)
2015–2016	Atlético Paranaense	0	(0)
2017–2019	Patriotas	34	(0)
2018–2019	→ Rosario Central (loan)	21	(1)
2021	América de Cali	0	(0)
2022	Deportivo Riestra	0	(0)
2022	Llaneros	20	(1)
2023	Monagas	2	(0)
2024	Tigres F.C.	15	(1)
2025	San Francisco F.C.	18	(1)
2025–	Llaneros	2	(0)

International career
2013	Colombia U17	3	(0)
- * Club domestic league appearances and goals as of 12 December 2025

Óscar Eduardo Cabezas Segura (born 22 December 1996) is a Colombian professional footballer who plays as a defender for Llaneros.

== Career ==
=== Club ===
Cabezas had youth spells with Club Juanito Moreno and Atlético Paranaense, he didn't make a first-team appearance for either of those two sides but was once an unused substitute for Atlético Paranaense in their October 2015 Campeonato Paranaense match with Coritiba. In January 2017, Patriotas completed the signing of Cabezas. They gave him his professional debut on 9 February during a league victory over Once Caldas. In total, Cabezas featured thiry-four times during the 2017 Categoría Primera A season as the club finished 15th overall. On 24 January 2018, Cabezas was loaned by Rosario Central.

He made his debut in the Argentine Primera División versus Unión Santa Fe on 3 February, prior to scoring his first senior goal on 7 April against Belgrano.

=== International ===
Cabezas represented Colombia at U17 level, winning three caps at the 2013 South American Under-17 Football Championship in Argentina.

== Career statistics ==
As of 22 May 2018.

Club statistics
Club	Season	League			Cup (Note: Includes the Copa do Brasil, Copa Colombia and Copa Argentina)		League Cup		Continental (Note: Includes the Copa Sudamericana)		Other		Total	
Club	Season	Division	Apps	Goals	Apps	Goals	Apps	Goals	Apps	Goals	Apps	Goals	Apps	Goals
Atlético Paranaense	2015	Série A	0	0	0	0	—		0	0	0	0	0	0
Atlético Paranaense	2016	Série A	0	0	0	0	—		—		0	0	0	0
Atlético Paranaense	Total		0	0	0	0	—		0	0	0	0	0	0
Patriotas	2017	Categoría Primera A	34	0	6	0	—		4 (Note: Four appearances in 2017 Copa Sudamericana)	0	0	0	44	0
Patriotas	2018	Categoría Primera A	0	0	0	0	—		—		0	0	0	0
Patriotas	Total		34	0	6	0	—		4	0	0	0	44	0
Rosario Central (loan)	2017–18	Primera División	10	1	0	0	—		2 (Note: Two appearances in 2018 Copa Sudamericana)	0	0	0	12	1
Career total			44	1	6	0	—		6	0	0	0	56	1

== Honours ==
Rosario Central

- Copa Argentina: 2017–18
