= Danny Quendambú =

Colombian footballer (born 1983)

Personal information
- Full name: Danny Jair Quendambú Cortés
- Date of birth: 19 March 1983 (age 43)
- Place of birth: Tumaco, Colombia
- Height: 1.77 m (5 ft 10 in)
- Position: Forward

Senior career*
Years	Team	Apps	(Gls)
2002	Deportivo Cali		
2002	Deportivo Pereira		
2003	Deportivo Pasto		
2003–2004	Unión Magdalena	10	(1)
2005	Herediano	7	(0)
2006	Santacruceña	18	(4)
2006–2007	San Carlos	27	(3)
2007	Herediano	3	(0)
2008	U. Costa Rica	17	(2)
2009	Carabobo	5	(0)
2010	Cortuluá	8	(1)
2012–2015	The Panthers		
2016–2017	Leones Vegetarianos		
2018	Cultural Santa Rosa	4	(0)

International career^{‡}
2012	Equatorial Guinea	1	(0)
- * Club domestic league appearances and goals as of 16:09, 16 February 2020 (UTC) ‡ National team caps and goals as of 24 April 2014

Danny Jair Quendambú Cortés (born 19 March 1983) is a Colombian former footballer who played as a forward.

Born in Tumaco, Quendambú began playing football with the youth sides of Deportivo Cali. He would play professionally for several teams in Colombia, Costa Rica, Peru and Venezuela, including Deportivo Cali, Herediano, Carabobo, Cortuluá and Inti Gas. He joined Inti Gas in January 2011. He also played in Equatorial Guinea, first for that country national team and then for local clubs The Panthers and Leones Vegetarianos. His last club was Cultural Santa Rosa in the Peruvian Segunda División.

== International career ==
While he was playing for Deportivo Cali, Quendambú participated in the Colombia national under-20 football team under manager Reinaldo Rueda.

Although Quendambú had no real ties with Equatorial Guinea, despite being an Afro-Colombian with a surname of African style, anyway he was called up for that country's national team. His first call was received in October 2011, when he still had not even ever walked in his "new" country, for two friendly matches against Gabon and Cameroon, but didn't play. Quendambú participated after this of the Equatoguinean pre-call for the 2012 African Cup of Nations, but he was left out for the final squad. He made his debut on 2 June 2012 versus Tunisia for a 2014 FIFA World Cup qualifying match.
