= Augusto Vargas Cortés =

Colombian footballer (born 1962)

Personal information
- Date of birth: 26 March 1962 (age 64)
- Place of birth: Tumaco, Colombia

International career
Years	Team	Apps	(Gls)
1991	Colombia	1	(0)

Augusto Vargas Cortés (born 26 March 1962) is a Colombian footballer. He played in one match for the Colombia national football team in 1991. He was also part of Colombia's squad for the 1991 Copa América tournament.
