= Rolan de la Cruz =

Colombian footballer (born 1984)

Personal information
- Full name: Rolan de la Cruz Biojó
- Date of birth: 3 October 1984 (age 42)
- Place of birth: Tumaco, Colombia
- Position: Midfielder

Senior career*
Years	Team	Apps	(Gls)
2005–2008	Deportivo Cali	26	(1)
2007	→ Deportivo Pasto (loan)	6	(0)
2007	→ Independiente Santa Fe (loan)	4	(0)
2008	→ Cortuluá (loan)	12	(1)
2010	Árabe Unido	6	(1)
2011–2012	Fortaleza	21	(2)
2013	The Panthers		

International career^{‡}
2011–2012	Equatorial Guinea	3	(0)
- * Club domestic league appearances and goals as of 23 January 2015 ‡ National team caps and goals as of 23 January 2015

Rolan de la Cruz Biojó (born 3 October 1984) is a former footballer who played a midfielder. Born in Colombia, he capped for the Equatorial Guinea national team.

== Career ==
Born in Tumaco, Colombia, De la Cruz had played club football in Colombia and Panama for Deportivo Cali, Deportivo Pasto, Santa Fe, Cortuluá, Árabe Unido and Fortaleza. In early 2013, De la Cruz was on trial in Colombian giant América de Cali (now in second division), but failed to sign.

He made his international debut for Equatorial Guinea in 2011.

== Personal life ==
De la Cruz descends from Benkos Bioho, but this rebel slave was a native of the former Portuguese colony of Guinea-Bissau.

On 6 October 2023, De la Cruz was captured by the Joint Stabilization and Consolidation Task Force Hercules, together with the Specialized Anti-Drug Trafficking Directorate of the Prosecutor's Office and the United States Drug Enforcement Administration Agency (DEA), accused of being an important drug trafficker in his native Tumaco.
