= William Hurtado =

Colombian footballer (born 2004)

Personal information
- Full name: William Camilo Hurtado Ortiz
- Date of birth: 31 May 2004 (age 22)
- Place of birth: Tumaco, Colombia
- Height: 1.70 m (5 ft 7 in)
- Position: Midfielder

Team information
- Current team: Envigado
- Number: 14

Youth career
- –2021: Envigado

Senior career*
| Years | Team | Apps | (Gls) |
| 2021– | Envigado | 72 | (2) |
- * Club domestic league appearances and goals as of 12 December 2025

William Camilo Hurtado Ortiz (born 31 May 2004) is a Colombian footballer who currently plays as a midfielder for Envigado.

== Career statistics ==
=== Club ===
As of 25 January 2022.

| Club | Season | League | | | Cup | | Continental | | Other | | Total | |
| Club | Season | Division | Apps | Goals | Apps | Goals | Apps | Goals | Apps | Goals | Apps | Goals |
|---|---|---|---|---|---|---|---|---|---|---|---|---|
| Envigado | 2021 | Categoría Primera A | 1 | 0 | 1 (Note: Appearances in the Copa Colombia) | 0 | 0 | 0 | 0 | 0 | 2 | 0 |
| Envigado | 2022 | Categoría Primera A | 1 | 0 | 0 | 0 | 0 | 0 | 0 | 0 | 1 | 0 |
| Career total | | | 2 | 0 | 1 | 0 | 0 | 0 | 0 | 0 | 3 | 0 |
