= Mateus Oliveira =

Mateus Oliveira may refer to:

- Mateus Vicente de Oliveira (1706–1786), Portuguese architect
- Mateus Oliveira (footballer, born 1994), Brazilian football defensive midfielder

== See also ==
- Matheus Oliveira (disambiguation)
