= Edgar Teixeira =

Macanese footballer

Personal information
- Full name: Edgar Jesus Pereira Oliveira Teixeira
- Date of birth: 1 December 1989 (age 36)
- Place of birth: Santa Maria da Feira, Portugal
- Height: 1.80 m (5 ft 11 in)
- Position: Midfielder

Youth career
- 1998–2007: Feirense
- 2007: Boavista
- 2007–2008: Espinho

Senior career*
Years	Team	Apps	(Gls)
2008–2009	Grijó		
2009–2010	Lusitânia	8	(0)
2010–2011	Fiães	27	(2)
2012–2018	Benfica (Macau)	101	(28)

International career
2015–2017	Macau	7	(0)
- * Club domestic league appearances and goals

Edgar Jesus Pereira Oliveira Teixeira (born 1 December 1989) is a former Macanese international footballer.

== Career statistics ==
=== Club ===
Club	Season	League			Cup		Other		Total	
Club	Season	Division	Apps	Goals	Apps	Goals	Apps	Goals	Apps	Goals
Lusitânia	2009–10	Segunda Divisão	8	0	1 (Note: Appearances in the Taça de Portugal)	0	0	0	9	0
Fiães	2010–11	Terceira Divisão	27	2	2	0	0	0	29	2
Benfica (Macau)	2012	Campeonato da 1ª Divisão	14	1	0	0	0	0	14	1
Benfica (Macau)	2013	Campeonato da 1ª Divisão	18	3	0	0	0	0	18	3
Benfica (Macau)	2014	Campeonato da 1ª Divisão	9	1	0	0	0	0	9	1
Benfica (Macau)	2015	Campeonato da 1ª Divisão	16	2	0	0	0	0	16	2
Benfica (Macau)	2016	Campeonato da 1ª Divisão	17	4	0	0	2 (Note: Appearances in the AFC Cup)	0	19	4
Benfica (Macau)	2017	Liga de Elite	17	12	0	0	2	0	19	12
Benfica (Macau)	2018	Liga de Elite	10	5	0	0	6	1	16	6
Benfica (Macau)	Total		101	28	0	0	10	1	111	29
Career total			136	30	3	0	10	1	149	31

=== International ===
National team	Year	Apps	Goals
Macau	2015	1	0
Macau	2016	4	0
Macau	2017	2	0
Total		7	0
