= Dilan Zúñiga =

Chilean footballer (born 1996)

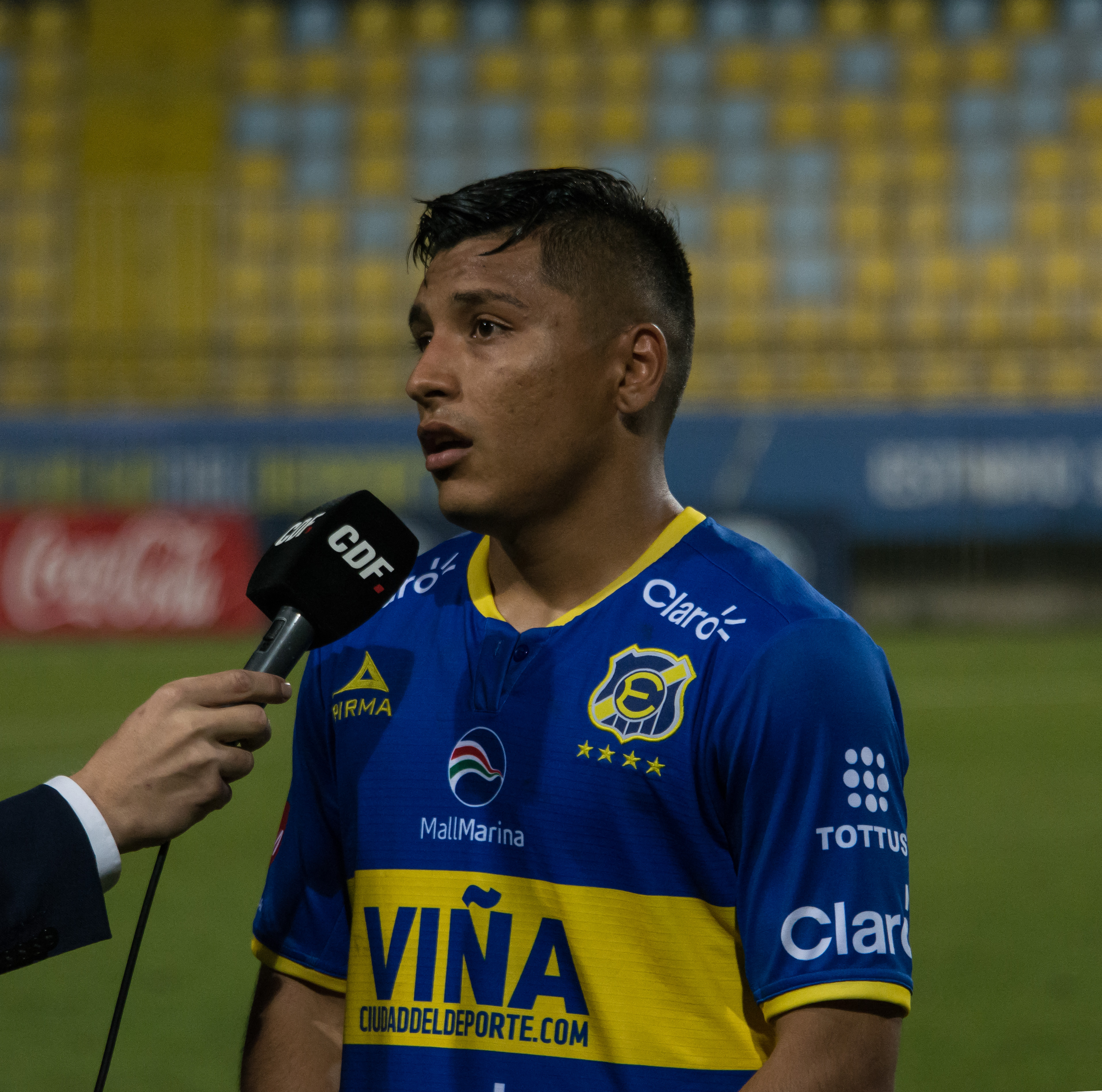
- Zúñiga with Everton in 2018

Personal information
- Full name: Dilan Patricio Zúñiga Espinoza
- Date of birth: 26 June 1996 (age 30)
- Place of birth: Santiago, Chile
- Height: 1.81 m (5 ft 11 in)
- Position: Left back

Team information
- Current team: Palestino

Youth career
- Colo-Colo

Senior career*
Years	Team	Apps	(Gls)
2012–2013	Colo-Colo B	11	(0)
2012–2017	Colo-Colo	5	(0)
2016–2017	→ Everton (loan)	24	(1)
2017–2021	Everton	110	(1)
2019	→ León (loan)	3	(0)
2022	Coquimbo Unido	13	(0)
2023–	Palestino	49	(1)
- * Club domestic league appearances and goals as of 17 April 2025

Dilan Patricio Zúñiga Espinoza (born 26 July 1996) is a Chilean footballer that currently plays for Primera División club Palestino as a left back.

== Honours ==
=== Club ===
Colo-Colo

- Torneo Clausura (1): 2014
