= Neymar Sánchez =

Colombian footballer (born 2003)

Personal information
- Full name: Neymar David Sánchez Segura
- Date of birth: 17 November 2003 (age 22)
- Place of birth: Tumaco, Colombia
- Positions: Winger; midfielder

Team information
- Current team: Millonarios
- Number: 27

Youth career
- 2017: Fútbol Paz
- 2019–2021: Bogotá

Senior career*
Years	Team	Apps	(Gls)
2021–2022	Bogotá	3	(1)
2023–	Atlético Bucaramanga	2	(1)
- * Club domestic league appearances and goals as of 9 May 2023

Neymar David Sánchez Segura (born 17 November 2003) is a Colombian footballer who plays as a winger or midfielder for Millonarios.

== Club career ==
Born in Tumaco, Sánchez began playing football at the age of thirteen in Valle del Cauca, playing for a club named Fútbol Paz de Cali for a month. He played for another club in the Torneo de Las Américas, before joining the academy of Bogotá two years later. After two years in the youth team, he was given his debut in the Categoría Primera B on 7 March 2021. On just his second appearance with the club, he scored in a 2–0 win against Tigres.

Despite the good start to his career with Bogotá, he stopped featuring, and would go on to join Atlético Bucaramanga. On his first start for his new club, and his second appearance, he scored in a 3–0 Categoría Primera A win against Unión Magdalena.

== Personal life ==
Despite sharing the same name, Sánchez says he was not named after Santos and Brazil forward Neymar, with the Brazilian making his professional debut in 2009, six years after Sánchez's birth.

== Career statistics ==
=== Club ===
As of 9 May 2023

Appearances and goals by club, season and competition
Club	Season	League			Cup		Other		Total	
Club	Season	Division	Apps	Goals	Apps	Goals	Apps	Goals	Apps	Goals
Bogotá	2021	Categoría Primera B	3	1	0	0	0	0	3	1
Bogotá	2022	Categoría Primera B	0	0	0	0	0	0	0	0
Bogotá	Total		3	1	0	0	0	0	3	1
Atlético Bucaramanga	2023	Categoría Primera A	2	1	0	0	0	0	2	1
Career total			5	2	0	0	0	0	5	2
