= Abner Felipe =

Brazilian footballer (born 1996)

Abner
Personal information
- Full name: Abner Felipe Souza de Almeida
- Date of birth: 30 May 1996 (age 30)
- Place of birth: Londrina, Brazil
- Height: 1.79 m (5 ft 10 in)
- Position: Left-back

Team information
- Current team: Dunkerque
- Number: 30

Youth career
- 2008–2011: PSTC
- 2011–2014: → Coritiba (loan)

Senior career*
Years	Team	Apps	(Gls)
2013–2017	PSTC	0	(0)
2013–2014	→ Coritiba (loan)	1	(0)
2014–2017	→ Real Madrid B (loan)	24	(0)
2017–2018	Real Madrid B	0	(0)
2017	→ Estoril (loan)	10	(0)
2018–2020	PSTC	0	(0)
2017–2018	→ Coritiba (loan)	19	(0)
2019–2020	→ Athletico Paranaense (loan)	5	(0)
2020	→ Água Santa (loan)	9	(0)
2020–2023	Farense	74	(1)
2023–2024	RWDM	25	(0)
2024–	Dunkerque	42	(0)

International career
2013	Brazil U17	9	(1)
2014	Brazil U20	9	(0)
- * Club domestic league appearances and goals as of 4 September 2026

Abner Felipe Souza de Almeida (born 30 May 1996), simply known as Abner, is a Brazilian professional footballer who plays as a left-back for Ligue 2 club Dunkerque.

== Club career ==
=== Coritiba ===
Born in Londrina, Paraná, Abner finished his formation with Coritiba, after joining the club in 2011 from PSTC. On 3 June 2012, he agreed to a three-year contract, his first professional link. On 18 September 2013, at the age of 17, he made his first team – and Série A – debut, coming on as a second-half substitute for Sergio Escudero in a 2–2 home draw against Goiás; it was his only appearance for the club.

In October 2013, shortly after making his professional debut, Abner suffered a serious knee injury, being sidelined for six months. Subsequently, the 40% of his rights belonging to Coxa were sold to a group of businessman, and were assigned to PSTC (which already had 40% of the player).

=== Real Madrid ===
On 23 July 2014, despite long standing interest from Italian giants Roma, Abner signed for Real Madrid and was assigned to the reserves in Segunda División B. He made his debut for Castilla on 8 August, replacing Javi Noblejas late into a 2–1 loss at Atlético Madrid B.

On 5 September 2014, after only one further match for the B-team, Abner again suffered the same knee injury from the previous year, being sidelined for the campaign. The following 10 July, now fully recovered, he was called up to the main squad by manager Rafa Benítez to feature in the pre-season tours in Australia and China; six days later, however, he was cut from the squad after suffering a setback from his injury.

Abner returned to the fields on 20 September 2015, playing 20 minutes in a 1–0 loss at Real Unión; three days later, he again suffered a serious knee injury during training, being again out for the season. After his third injury, he stated that he "considered leaving football", but Zinedine Zidane, at the time the Castilla manager, encouraged him to keep going.

In 2016–17, Abner managed to feature in 21 league matches without setbacks, as Castilla finished in a disappointing 11th position.

==== Loan to Estoril ====
On 20 August 2017, Abner was loaned to Primeira Liga side Estoril, for one year. He made his top tier debut on 10 September, starting in a 2–0 away defeat to Moreirense.

On 26 February 2018, after just ten league matches, Abner's loan was cancelled.

=== Coritiba return ===
On 3 April 2018, Abner returned to his first club Coritiba on loan from Real Madrid, until 30 June. On 20 July, he extended his link until the end of the year, but opted to leave on 8 December, after 19 league appearances.

=== Athletico Paranaense ===
On 8 March 2019, Abner was presented at Athletico Paranaense, after agreeing to a loan deal until the end of the year; he was initially assigned to the under-23 squad for the year's Campeonato Paranaense.

In January 2020, Abner was sent on loan to Campeonato Paulista club Água Santa.

=== Farense ===
In September 2020, Abner signed a three-year contract with Portuguese club Farense.

=== RWDM ===
On 30 June 2023, after his contract with Farense expired, Abner signed a one-year deal with RWDM in Belgium.

== International career ==
Abner represented Brazil at under-17 level at the 2013 South American U-17 Championship and at the 2013 FIFA U-17 World Cup in the United Arab Emirates. At the latter tournament, he suffered the first of his three knee injuries in a match against Honduras.

== Career statistics ==
As of 23 May 2025

Appearances and goals by club, season and competition
Club	Season	League			State League		Cup		Other		Total	
Club	Season	Division	Apps	Goals	Apps	Goals	Apps	Goals	Apps	Goals	Apps	Goals
Coritiba (loan)	2013	Série A	1	0	—		—		—		1	0
Coritiba (loan)	2014	Série A	0	0	0	0	—		—		0	0
Coritiba (loan)	Total		1	0	0	0	0	0	0	0	1	0
Real Madrid Castilla (loan)	2014–15	Segunda División B	2	0	—		—		—		2	0
Real Madrid Castilla (loan)	2015–16	Segunda División B	1	0	—		—		—		1	0
Real Madrid Castilla (loan)	2016–17	Segunda División B	21	0	—		—		—		21	0
Real Madrid Castilla (loan)	Total		24	0	0	0	0	0	0	0	24	0
Estoril (loan)	2017–18	Primeira Liga	10	0	—		0	0	1 (Note: Appearance(s) in Taça da Liga)	0	11	0
Coritiba (loan)	2018	Série B	19	0	—		—		—		19	0
Athletico Paranaense (loan)	2019	Série A	3	0	1 (Note: Appearance in 2019 Campeonato Paranaense)	0	0	0	—		4	0
Água Santa (loan)	2020	Paulista	—		9 (Note: Appearances in 2020 Campeonato Paulista)	0	—		—		9	0
Farense	2020–21	Primeira Liga	14	0	—		1	0	—		15	0
Farense	2021–22	Liga Portugal 2	30	0	—		1	0	2	0	33	0
Farense	2022–23	Liga Portugal 2	30	1	—		1	0	3	0	34	1
Farense	Total		74	1	0	0	3	0	5	0	82	1
RWDM	2023–24	Belgian Pro League	25	0	—		1	0	3 (Note: Appearances in Belgian Pro League relegation play-offs)	0	29	0
Dunkerque	2024–25	Ligue 2	30	0	—		1	0	2 (Note: Appearances in Ligue 2 promotion play-offs)	0	33	0
Career total			186	1	10	0	5	0	11	0	212	1

== Honours ==
Athletico Paranaense

- Copa do Brasil: 2019
- Campeonato Paranaense: 2019

Individual

- Liga Portugal 2 Team of the Season: 2022–23
