= Javier Rojas (footballer) =

Bolivian footballer (born 1996)

Personal information
- Full name: Javier Rojas Iguaro
- Date of birth: 14 January 1996 (age 30)
- Place of birth: Santa Cruz, Bolivia
- Height: 1.85 m (6 ft 1 in)
- Position: Goalkeeper

Team information
- Current team: Bolívar
- Number: 1

Youth career
- –2015: Bolívar

Senior career*
Years	Team	Apps	(Gls)
2015–2017	Bolívar	0	(0)
2017	Ciclón		
2017–2018	Petrolero	0	(0)
2018–2020	Nacional Potosí	52	(0)
2020–	Bolívar	2	(0)

International career^{‡}
2013	Bolivia U17	4	(0)
2015	Bolivia U20	2	(0)
2021–	Bolivia	1	(0)
- * Club domestic league appearances and goals as of 16:11, 13 June 2019 (UTC) ‡ National team caps and goals as of 29 March 2021

Javier Rojas Iguaro (born 14 January 1996) is a Bolivian professional footballer who plays as a goalkeeper for Bolívar.

== Club career ==
Rojas made his professional debut for Nacional Potosí in the Bolivian Primera División on 6 April 2018, starting in the home match against Royal Pari, which finished as a 2–2 draw.

== International career ==
In May 2019, Rojas was included in Bolivia's senior squad for the 2019 Copa América in Brazil. He made his debut on 29 March 2021 in a friendly against Ecuador.
