= Juan Caicedo (footballer, born 1996) =

Colombian footballer

Personal information
- Full name: Juan David Caicedo Vásquez
- Date of birth: April 12, 1996 (age 30)
- Place of birth: Tumaco, Nariño, Colombia
- Height: 1.85 m (6 ft 1 in)
- Position: Centre-back

Team information
- Current team: Patriotas Boyacá
- Number: 4

Senior career*
Years	Team	Apps	(Gls)
2013–2016	Universitario Popayán		
2016–2018	Santos Laguna	3	(0)
2017–2018	→ Tampico Madero (loan)	1	(0)
2019	XV de Jaú	15	(0)
2020–	Patriotas Boyacá	3	(0)
- * Club domestic league appearances and goals as of 24 November 2020

Juan David Caicedo Vasquez (born April 12, 1996) is a Colombian professional footballer who plays as a centre-back for Patriotas Boyacá.

== Career ==
After a spell in Brazil, Caicedo returned to Colombia for the 2020 season and joined Patriotas Boyacá.
