= Dino Agote =

Chilean footballer (born 1996)

Personal information
- Full name: Dino Sebastian Agote Delgado
- Date of birth: 30 June 1996 (age 30)
- Place of birth: Antofagasta
- Height: 1.70 m (5 ft 7 in)
- Position: Left back

Team information
- Current team: Municipal Mejillones

Youth career
- ????–2015: Universidad Católica

Senior career*
Years	Team	Apps	(Gls)
2013–2017	Universidad Católica	0	(0)
2015–2016	→ Rangers de Talca (loan)	11	(1)
2016–2017	→ Deportes Antofagasta (loan)	10	(1)
2017–2018	→ Magallanes (loan)	12	(0)
2018–	Municipal Mejillones	0	(0)

International career^{‡}
2013	Chile U17	4	(0)
- * Club domestic league appearances and goals as of 29 June 2018 ‡ National team caps and goals as of 15 November 2008

Dino Sebastian Agote Delgado (born 30 June 1996), is a Chilean footballer who plays as a right back for Municipal Mejillones.

== Club career ==
Dino did all lower in Universidad Católica but his debut was in Rangers de Talca.
