= Bryan Carvallo =

Chilean footballer (born 1996)

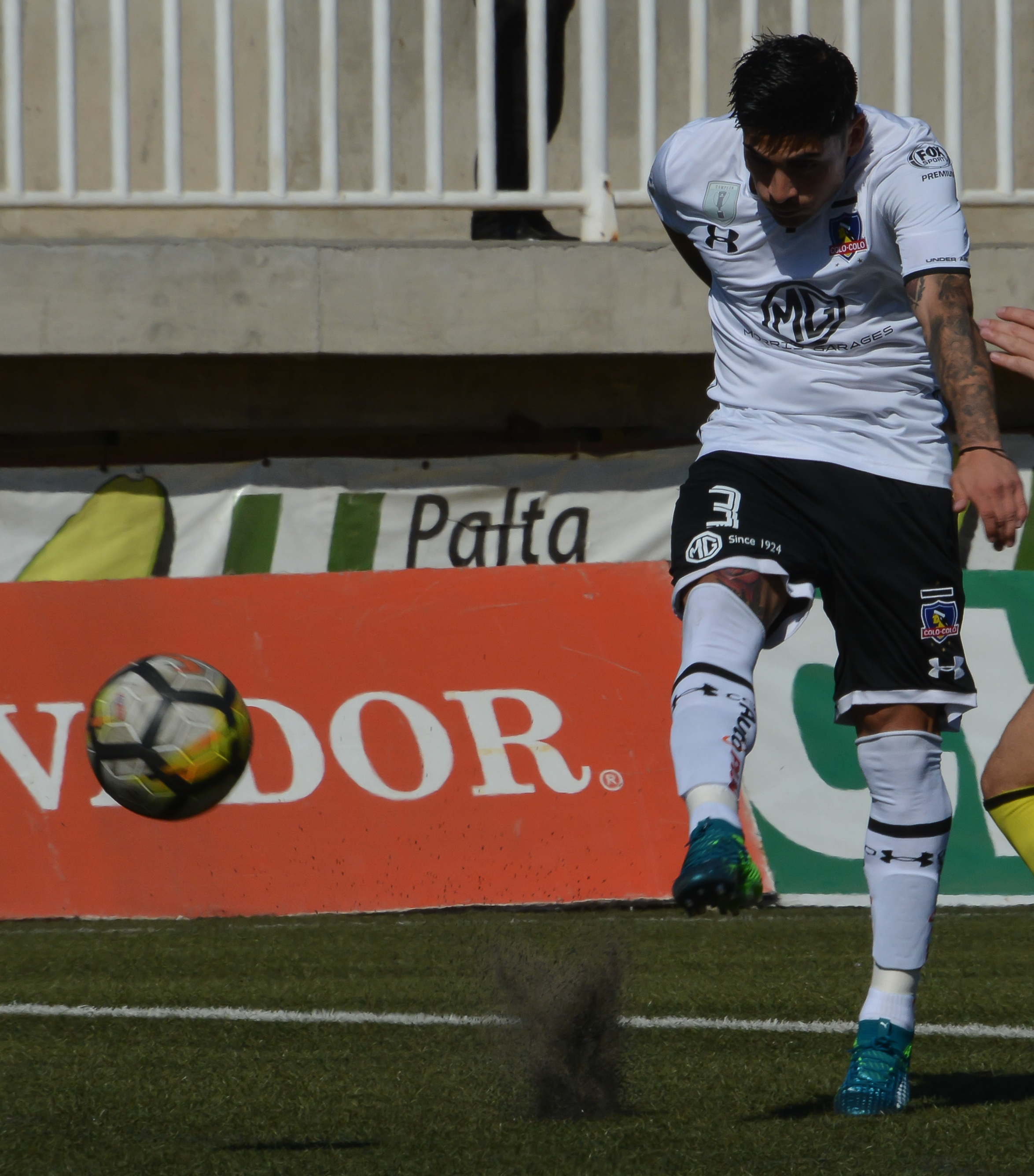
- Carvallo with Colo-Colo in 2018

Personal information
- Full name: Bryan Andrés Carvallo Utreras
- Date of birth: 15 September 1996 (age 30)
- Place of birth: Las Cabras, Chile
- Height: 1.68 m (5 ft 6 in)
- Position: Attacking midfielder

Youth career
- Colo-Colo

Senior career*
Years	Team	Apps	(Gls)
2012–2013	Colo-Colo B	5	(0)
2013–2018	Colo-Colo	23	(1)
2017	→ Deportes Antofagasta (loan)	28	(6)
2018–2021	Necaxa	6	(0)
2019	→ Everton (loan)	9	(2)
2020	→ Universidad de Concepción (loan)	28	(5)
2022	Unión La Calera	6	(0)
2022	Everton	15	(3)
2023–2025	Unión Española	49	(2)
2024	→ Deportes Iquique (loan)	13	(2)

International career^{‡}
2013	Chile U17	4	(1)
2014–2015	Chile U20	9	(2)
- * Club domestic league appearances and goals as of 10 December 2025 ‡ National team caps and goals as of 19 August 2014

Bryan Andrés Carvallo Utreras (born 15 September 1996) is a Chilean professional footballer who currently plays as an attacking midfielder.

== Club career ==
A product of Colo-Colo youth system, he began playing for Colo-Colo B in the Segunda División Profesional. In September 2018, he moved to Mexico and joined Necaxa in the Liga MX. After ending his contract with Necaxa, in 2022 he joined Unión La Calera. On second half 2022, he joined Everton de Viña del Mar by second time after his step in 2019.

In the second half of 2024, Carvallo joined Deportes Iquique on loan from Unión Española. He left Unión Española at the end of 2025.

== International career ==
Carvallo represented Chile at under-17 level in the 2013 South American Championship and Chile at under-20 level at friendly tournaments in 2014 and the 2015 South American Championship.

== Honours ==
Colo-Colo

- Primera División (1): 2014 Clausura
