= Luis Sotomayor =

Chilean footballer (born 1996)

Personal information
- Full name: Luis Ignacio Sotomayor Orrego
- Date of birth: 4 November 1996 (age 30)
- Place of birth: Iquique, Chile
- Height: 1.80 m (5 ft 11 in)
- Position: Goalkeeper

Team information
- Current team: Deportes Iquique
- Number: 1

Senior career*
Years	Team	Apps	(Gls)
2015–	Deportes Iquique	2	(0)
2016	→ Independiente Cauquenes (loan)	6	(0)
2019	→ Colchagua (loan)	24	(0)
- * Club domestic league appearances and goals as of 26 June 2023

Luis Ignacio Sotomayor Orrego (born 4 December 1996) is a Chilean footballer who plays as a goalkeeper for Deportes Iquique.

== Club career ==
In his debut season with Deportes Iquique, he played five 2014–15 Copa Chile games and was part of the 2013–14 team which won that tournament. After, he played on loan at Independiente de Cauquenes and Colchagua.

Mainly a substitute player, Sotomayor has just played two matches for Deportes Iquique until 2023, at league level.

== Honours ==
=== Club ===
Deportes Iquique

- Copa Chile: 2013–14
