= Sebastián Díaz (footballer, born 1996) =

Chilean footballer

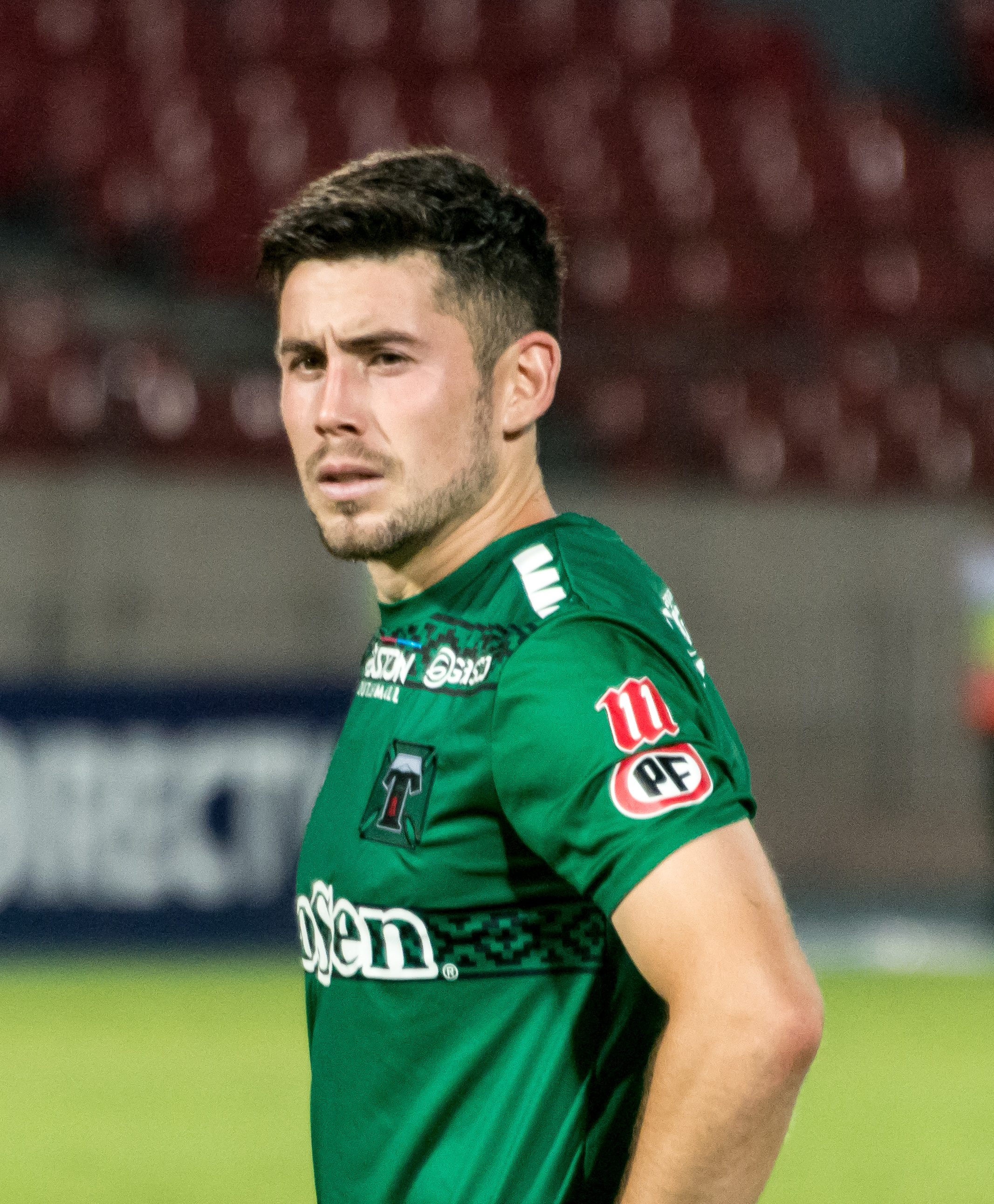
- Díaz with Deportes Temuco in 2020

Personal information
- Full name: Sebastián Andrés Díaz Aracena
- Date of birth: 26 February 1996 (age 30)
- Place of birth: Temuco, Chile
- Height: 1.72 m (5 ft 7 1/2 in)
- Position: Midfielder

Team information
- Current team: Deportes La Serena
- Number: 6

Youth career
- Unión Temuco

Senior career*
Years	Team	Apps	(Gls)
2013	Unión Temuco	2	(0)
2013–2022	Deportes Temuco	160	(3)
2018	→ Audax Italiano (loan)	13	(0)
2023	Universidad de Concepción	15	(0)
2024–	Deportes La Serena	0	(0)

International career
2013	Chile U17	4	(0)
2014–2015	Chile U20	3	(0)
- * Club domestic league appearances and goals as of 21 January 2024

Sebastián Andrés Díaz Aracena (born 26 February 1996) is a Chilean footballer who plays for Deportes La Serena as a defensive midfielder.

== Club career ==
He began his at hometown Unión Temuco, joining the youth set-up of the IX Region of La Araucanía team. He was promoted to first-team in 2013 when the club already was called Deportes Temuco, following the merger of both under Chilean legend Marcelo Salas administration.

In 2024, he joined Deportes La Serena from Universidad de Concepción in the second level.

== International career ==
He has represented Chile at under-17 and under-20 levels.

In 2015, he was called up by coach Nicolás Córdova for participe in the L'Alcúdia International Football Tournament at Valencia with Chile-U20 team, where he scored the only one goal during the semifinal match with UD Levante. Nevertheless, he was champion algonside the team of this tournament.

== Honours ==
Chile U20

- L'Alcúdia International Tournament (1): 2015
