= Iván Leszczuk =

Argentine footballer

Personal information
- Full name: Iván Luis Leszczuk
- Date of birth: 20 February 1996 (age 30)
- Place of birth: Lomas de Zamora, Argentina
- Height: 1.68 m (5 ft 6 in)
- Position: Midfielder

Team information
- Current team: San Martín

Youth career
- 2003–2016: Boca Juniors

Senior career*
Years	Team	Apps	(Gls)
2016–2017	Boca Juniors	0	(0)
2017–2019	Lanús	0	(0)
2018	→ Los Andes (loan)	8	(0)
2019	Los Andes	5	(0)
2019–2020	Fénix	7	(0)
2021–	San Martín	0	(0)

International career
2013	Argentina U17	14	(2)
2015	Argentina U20	1	(0)
- * Club domestic league appearances and goals as of 18:26, 19 February 2021 (UTC)

Iván Luis Leszczuk (born 20 February 1996) is an Argentine professional footballer who plays as a midfielder for San Martín.

== Club career ==
Leszczuk featured for the Boca Juniors academy from the age of six, a club he became a professional with in 2016. A year later, in 2017, Leszczuk signed with Lanús; having had off-field disagreements with Boca Juniors. On 29 May 2018, Leszczuk was loaned to Primera B Nacional's Los Andes; effective from 1 July, until 31 December. He made his senior bow during a home defeat to Independiente Rivadavia on 25 August 2018. He returned to Lanús after eight matches. Leszczuk resigned for Los Andes permanently in February 2019. However, he departed midway through the year to Fénix. He left in August 2020.

Leszczuk became a new signing of Primera C Metropolitana side San Martín in February 2021.

== International career ==
Leszczuk, who is of Polish descent, represented Argentina at U17 and U20 level. He won fourteen caps in 2013 for the U17s at both the South American Championship and FIFA World Cup, with his nation winning the first on home soil prior to finishing fourth at the World Cup in the United Arab Emirates; he scored two goals in the former against Colombia and Paraguay respectively. Two years later, Leszczuk won one cap at the 2015 South American U-20 Championship as he won his second international honour.

== Career statistics ==
As of 19 February 2021.

Appearances and goals by club, season and competition
Club	Season	League			Cup		League Cup		Continental		Other		Total	
Club	Season	Division	Apps	Goals	Apps	Goals	Apps	Goals	Apps	Goals	Apps	Goals	Apps	Goals
Boca Juniors	2016	Primera División	0	0	0	0	—		0	0	0	0	0	0
Boca Juniors	2016–17	Primera División	0	0	0	0	—		0	0	0	0	0	0
Boca Juniors	Total		0	0	0	0	—		0	0	0	0	0	0
Lanús	2017–18	Primera División	0	0	0	0	—		0	0	0	0	0	0
Lanús	2018–19	Primera División	0	0	0	0	0	0	—		0	0	0	0
Lanús	Total		0	0	0	0	0	0	0	0	0	0	0	0
Los Andes (loan)	2018–19	Primera B Nacional	8	0	0	0	—		—		0	0	8	0
Los Andes	2018–19	Primera B Nacional	5	0	0	0	—		—		0	0	5	0
Los Andes	Total		13	0	0	0	—		0	0	0	0	13	0
Fénix	2019–20	Primera B Metropolitana	7	0	0	0	—		—		0	0	7	0
San Martín	2021	Primera C Metropolitana	0	0	0	0	—		—		0	0	0	0
Career total			20	0	0	0	0	0	0	0	0	0	20	0

== Honours ==
Argentina U17s

- South American U-17 Championship: 2013

Argentina U20s

- South American Youth Football Championship: 2015
