= Tumaco =

San Andrés de Tumaco
- Municipality and city
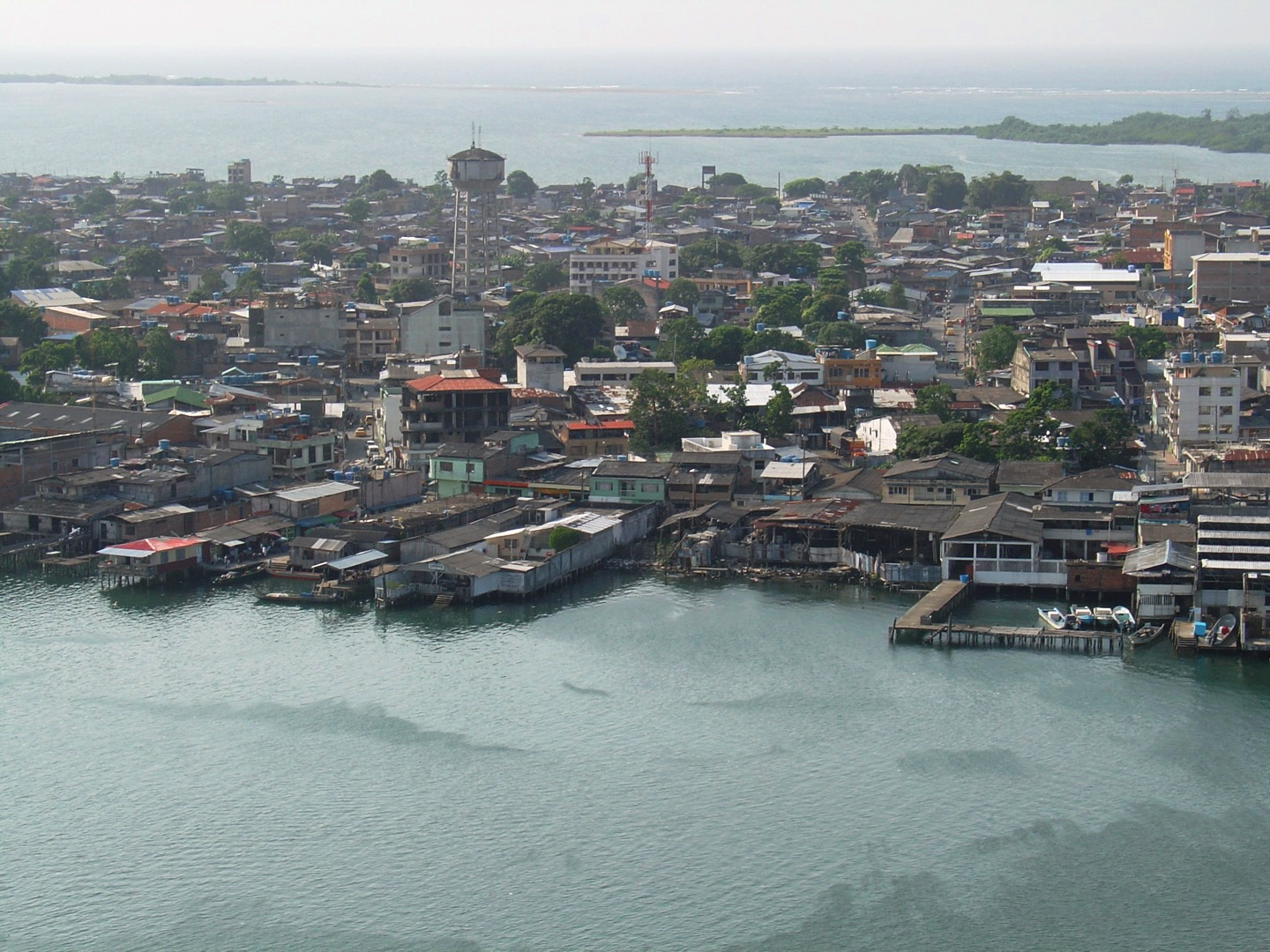
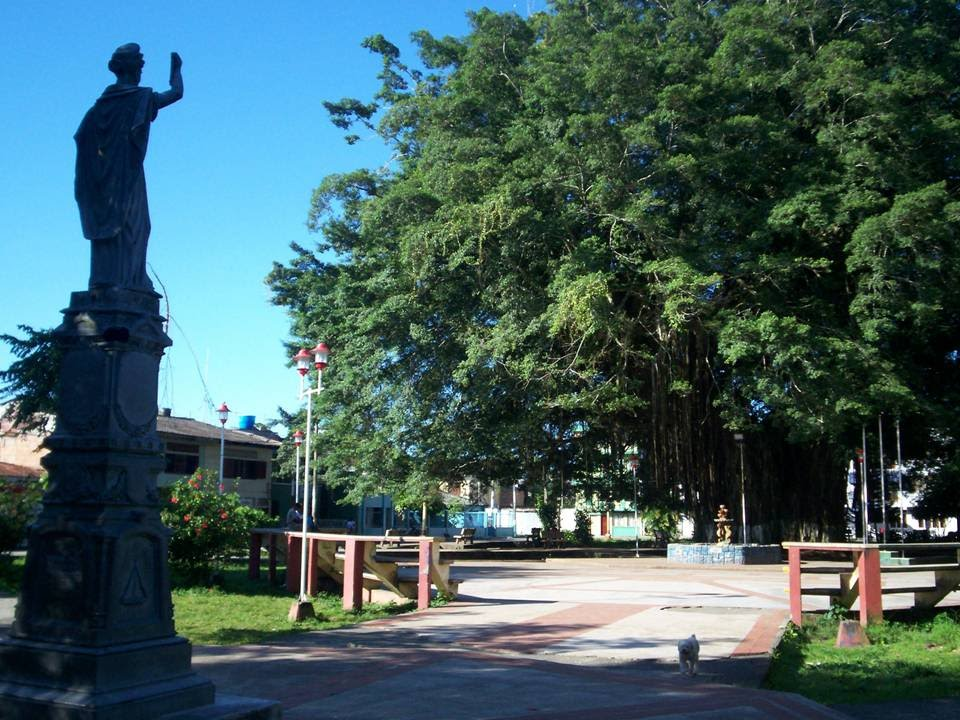
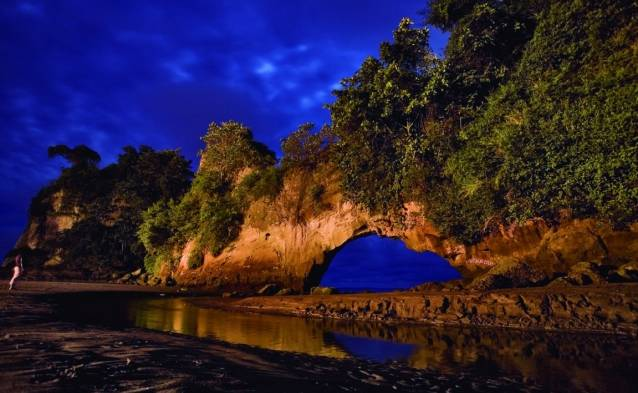
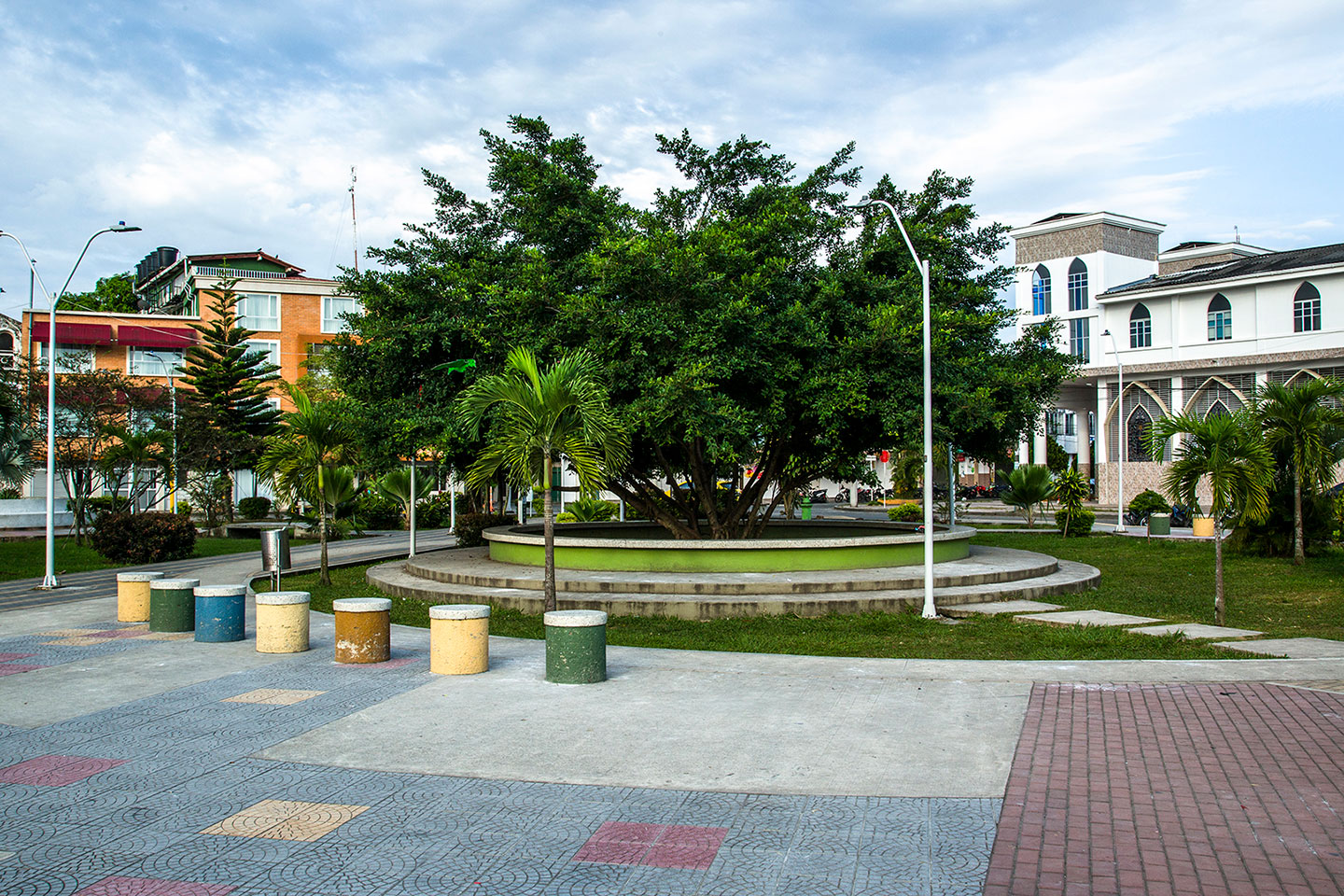
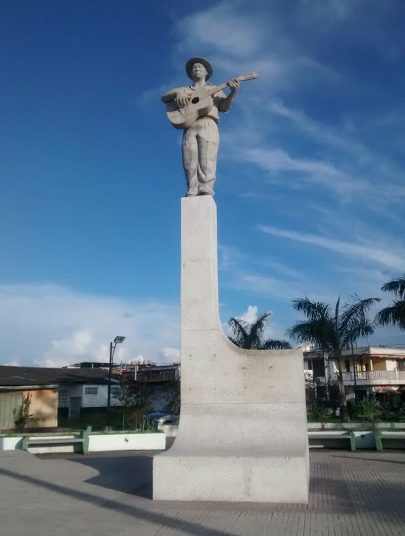
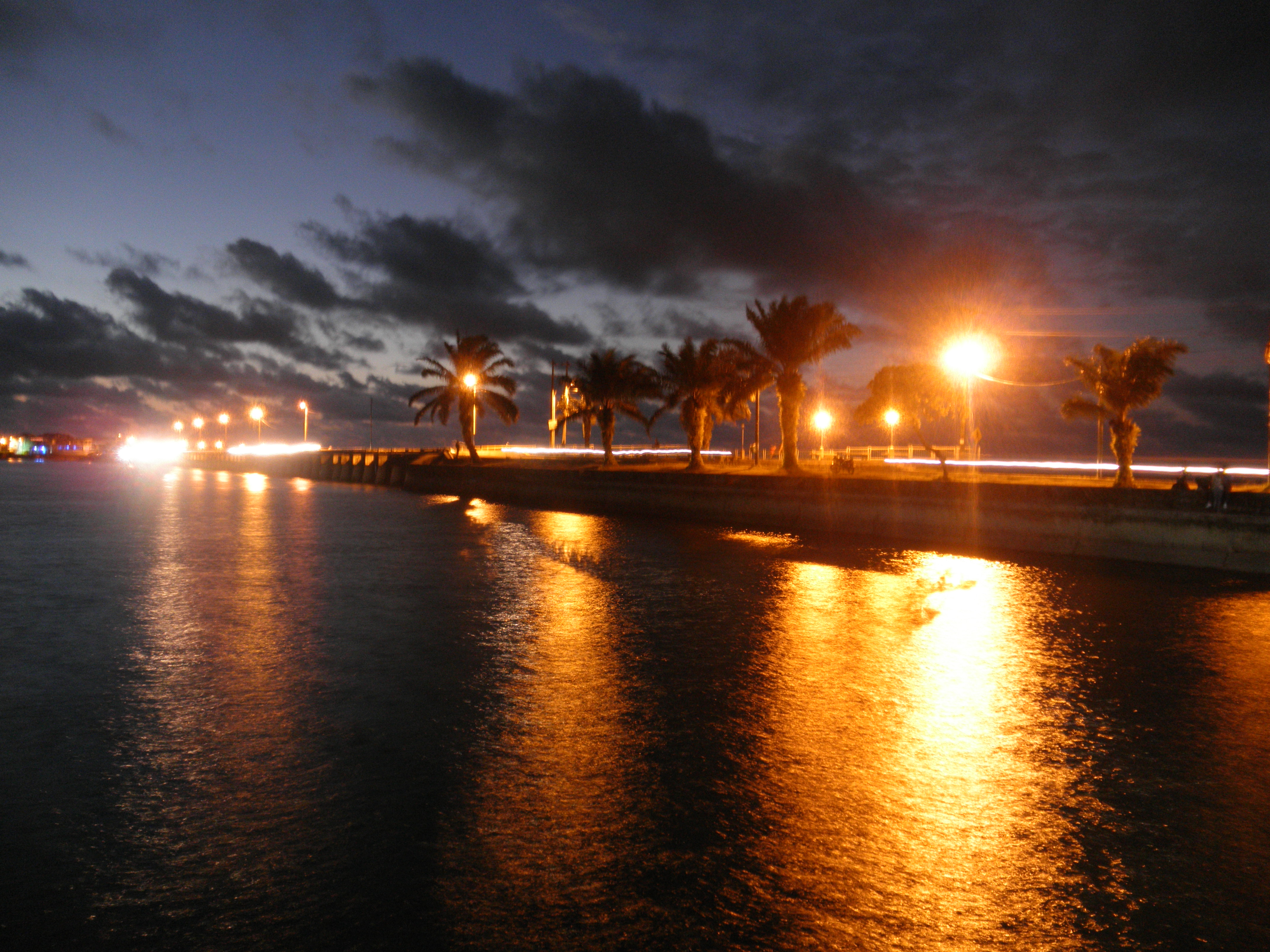
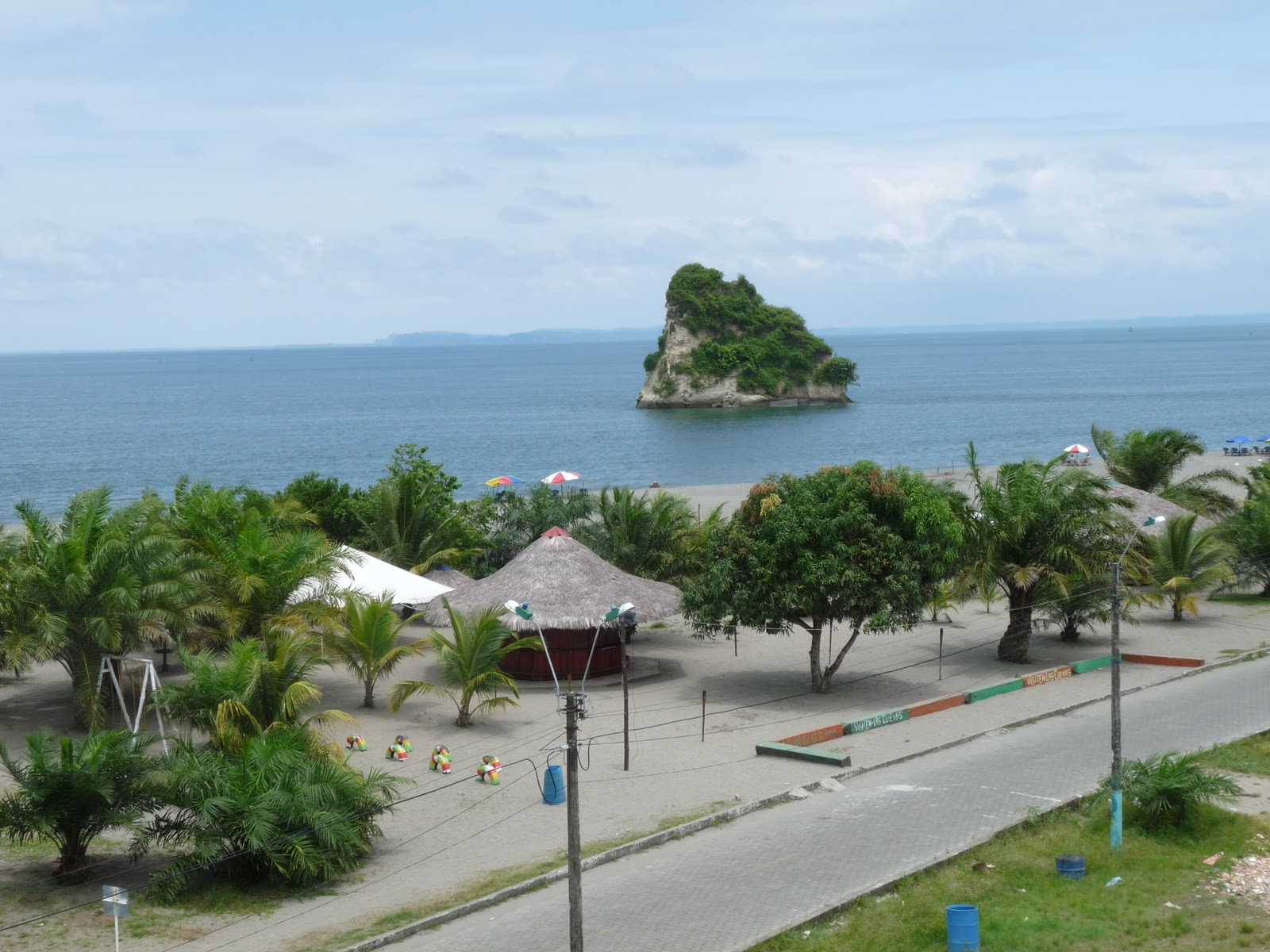

- Flag Coat of arms
- Motto: Tumaco For Everyone
- Location of the municipality (red) of Tumaco in the Nariño Department.

- Location within Colombia
- Coordinates: 1°48′24″N 78°45′53″W
- Country: Colombia
- Department: Nariño Department
- Founded: 1640

Government
  - Mayor: Julio César Rivera

Area
  - Municipality and city: 3,612 km^{2} (1,395 sq mi)
  - Urban: 11.25 km^{2} (4.34 sq mi)
- Elevation: 2 m (6.6 ft)

Population (2020 est.)
  - Municipality and city: 257,052
  - Density: 71.17/km^{2} (184.3/sq mi)
  - Urban: 86,614
  - Urban density: 7,699/km^{2} (19,940/sq mi)
- Demonym: Tumaquian
- Time zone: UTC−5
- Area code: 57 + 2
- Website: tumaco-narino.gov.co (in Spanish)

Tumaco is a port city and municipality in the Nariño Department, Colombia, by the Pacific Ocean. It is located on the southwestern corner of Colombia, near the border with Ecuador, and experiences a hot tropical climate. Tumaco is inhabited mainly by Afro-descendants and some indigenous people.

Tumaco is accessible by plane from Pasto, the capital city of Nariño Department, as well as from Cali and Bogotá. It can also be reached by land via highway from Pasto and San Lorenzo (Ecuador). Tumaco is known for being the hometown of many great Colombian soccer players, including Willington Ortiz.

Colombian film director Samuel Córdoba released a documentary about the city in 2009. The film, entitled "Tumaco Pacífico", chronicles the stilt-house area of the city, predominantly populated by Afro-Colombians. Córdoba was inspired by a panoramic photo of the stilt houses he saw in a photography book on Tumaco. The film won first place at the Festival de Cine Latinoamericano de Bordeaux, in France, and was presented at the Festival Internacional de Cine, in Santiago, Chile.

Other places of interest include ecotourism sites and beaches located near the mouth of the Mira River, where the river meets the sea. Also, there are the Playas de Milagros (beaches of Miracles), and Bocananueva y Teran beaches, where visitors can experience the diversity of flora and fauna first-hand.

== History ==
Tumaco was highly affected by the Colombian armed conflict as recently as 2011. On 17 August 2011, four soldiers from the Colombian army were killed in Tumaco by FARC-EP guerrillas from the 29th front. On 29 August 2011 five more soldiers were killed by guerrillas in the outskirts of the city, A few weeks earlier, guerrillas from the Western Bloc of the FARC-EP stormed the local prison, freeing roughly fifteen imprisoned FARC members.

On 26 September, seven people, including a local politician, were killed by unidentified gunmen in the inner city. The perpetrators also kidnapped one politician. Apart from the FARC-EP, the area was the home turf of paramilitary groups like the right-wing Los Rastrojos and the Guevarist, left-wing Ejército de Liberación Nacional.

== Climate ==
Like all of the Colombian Pacific coast, Tumaco has a hot, rainy, overcast and humid tropical rainforest climate (Köppen Af), although it is less extreme than areas further north, with annual rainfall totalling only around 2,600 millimetres (102.4 in), vis-à-vis 6,900 millimetres (271.7 in) at Buenaventura and 8,130 millimetres (320.1 in) at Quibdó. The wettest months are from January to June, and there is a rainfall trough in August opposite to northern Colombia.

Climate data for Tumaco (Cccp Dl Pacifico), elevation 1 m (3.3 ft), (1981–2010)
| Month | Jan | Feb | Mar | Apr | May | Jun | Jul | Aug | Sep | Oct | Nov | Dec | Year |
|---|---|---|---|---|---|---|---|---|---|---|---|---|---|
| Mean daily maximum °C (°F) | 29.0 (84.2) | 29.3 (84.7) | 29.6 (85.3) | 29.7 (85.5) | 29.4 (84.9) | 29.2 (84.6) | 29.1 (84.4) | 29.1 (84.4) | 28.9 (84.0) | 29.0 (84.2) | 28.8 (83.8) | 28.8 (83.8) | 29.1 (84.4) |
| Daily mean °C (°F) | 25.8 (78.4) | 26.1 (79.0) | 26.3 (79.3) | 26.5 (79.7) | 26.4 (79.5) | 26.1 (79.0) | 25.9 (78.6) | 25.9 (78.6) | 25.8 (78.4) | 25.8 (78.4) | 25.6 (78.1) | 25.7 (78.3) | 26 (79) |
| Mean daily minimum °C (°F) | 23.3 (73.9) | 23.5 (74.3) | 23.8 (74.8) | 23.8 (74.8) | 23.8 (74.8) | 23.6 (74.5) | 23.5 (74.3) | 23.5 (74.3) | 23.6 (74.5) | 23.6 (74.5) | 23.5 (74.3) | 23.4 (74.1) | 23.6 (74.5) |
| Average precipitation mm (inches) | 341.8 (13.46) | 276.8 (10.90) | 286.9 (11.30) | 330.8 (13.02) | 360.1 (14.18) | 217.8 (8.57) | 166.4 (6.55) | 97.1 (3.82) | 125.5 (4.94) | 113.9 (4.48) | 136.2 (5.36) | 205.1 (8.07) | 2,610.6 (102.78) |
| Average precipitation days | 21 | 19 | 19 | 21 | 24 | 22 | 19 | 16 | 17 | 15 | 14 | 17 | 220 |
| Average relative humidity (%) | 88 | 88 | 86 | 87 | 88 | 88 | 87 | 86 | 86 | 86 | 87 | 88 | 87 |
| Mean monthly sunshine hours | 114.7 | 127.0 | 158.1 | 153.0 | 124.0 | 111.0 | 130.2 | 142.6 | 105.0 | 108.5 | 99.0 | 105.4 | 1,478.5 |
| Mean daily sunshine hours | 3.7 | 4.5 | 5.1 | 5.1 | 4.0 | 3.7 | 4.2 | 4.6 | 3.5 | 3.5 | 3.3 | 3.4 | 4.1 |
Source: Instituto de Hidrologia Meteorologia y Estudios Ambientales

Climate data for Tumaco (Mira El Gja), elevation 16 m (52 ft), (1981–2010)
| Month | Jan | Feb | Mar | Apr | May | Jun | Jul | Aug | Sep | Oct | Nov | Dec | Year |
|---|---|---|---|---|---|---|---|---|---|---|---|---|---|
| Mean daily maximum °C (°F) | 30.0 (86.0) | 30.6 (87.1) | 31.1 (88.0) | 31.0 (87.8) | 30.3 (86.5) | 29.8 (85.6) | 29.7 (85.5) | 29.5 (85.1) | 29.3 (84.7) | 29.4 (84.9) | 29.5 (85.1) | 29.4 (84.9) | 30.0 (86.0) |
| Daily mean °C (°F) | 25.7 (78.3) | 26.0 (78.8) | 26.2 (79.2) | 26.2 (79.2) | 26.0 (78.8) | 25.4 (77.7) | 25.4 (77.7) | 25.3 (77.5) | 25.2 (77.4) | 25.3 (77.5) | 25.3 (77.5) | 25.4 (77.7) | 25.6 (78.1) |
| Mean daily minimum °C (°F) | 22.4 (72.3) | 22.8 (73.0) | 22.7 (72.9) | 23.1 (73.6) | 23.0 (73.4) | 22.9 (73.2) | 22.5 (72.5) | 22.5 (72.5) | 22.6 (72.7) | 22.6 (72.7) | 22.5 (72.5) | 22.6 (72.7) | 22.7 (72.9) |
| Average precipitation mm (inches) | 298.4 (11.75) | 274.6 (10.81) | 260.2 (10.24) | 359.4 (14.15) | 418.8 (16.49) | 288.5 (11.36) | 232.2 (9.14) | 143.5 (5.65) | 174.1 (6.85) | 153.2 (6.03) | 137.5 (5.41) | 206.1 (8.11) | 2,946.6 (116.01) |
| Average precipitation days | 23 | 20 | 20 | 23 | 26 | 23 | 21 | 17 | 20 | 20 | 17 | 20 | 246 |
| Average relative humidity (%) | 88 | 88 | 87 | 88 | 89 | 89 | 89 | 88 | 88 | 88 | 89 | 89 | 88 |
| Mean monthly sunshine hours | 80.6 | 87.5 | 105.4 | 102.0 | 83.7 | 60.0 | 83.7 | 77.5 | 57.0 | 65.1 | 57.0 | 65.1 | 924.6 |
| Mean daily sunshine hours | 2.6 | 3.1 | 3.4 | 3.4 | 2.7 | 2.0 | 2.7 | 2.5 | 1.9 | 2.1 | 1.9 | 2.1 | 2.5 |
Source: Instituto de Hidrologia Meteorologia y Estudios Ambientales

== Economy ==
Tumaco's location on the coast provides it with a number of maritime-related economic activities. One of the main lines of the region's economy is artisanal fishing. Shrimp farming is one of its strengths.

In recent years there has been a development in agricultural holdings; Crops present in the area, such as African palm, dry rice, and cocoa have become mechanised. Other crops of pancoger (small plots of peasant families) are the main source of food for their population.

The cultivation of cocoa is widely used among the peasant population; Tagua is also cultivated, known as ivory nut or vegetable ivory, it is the seed of the Phytelephas macrocarpa palm and its production, although in decline in the municipality, is still high.

Another product is the African palm (Elaeis guineensis) and the commercial cultivation of crude palm oil. There are about 35,000 hectares (140 sq mi) planted with African palm and 7 oil extraction plants, representing an important source of job creation for the region.

Tourism has gained important places in the economy of the municipality, the beaches of El Morro, Bocagrande and El Bajito every day attract national and foreign visitors. Tumaco is also the main Colombian oil port on the Pacific Ocean, and the second nationwide, after Coveñas. In recent years, the pipeline and the port have served to transport and export Ecuadorian oil, a situation that is reflected in the movement of its foreign trade.

== Transportation ==
La Florida Airport serves Tumaco with flights from Cali.

Tumaco is the site of Colombia's second most important Pacific port behind Buenaventura. Due to the limited development of roads in the region, the port is the primary way of accessing several villages along the coast.

A paved, 300 kilometres or 190 miles long highway connects Tumaco with the departmental capital Pasto.

== Notable people ==
- Stella Márquez (born 1939), Miss International 1960
- Álvaro Angulo (born 1997), footballer who represented the Colombia national team
- Iván Angulo (born 1999), footballer
- Martha Araújo (born 1996), heptathlete and 2024 Olympian
- Iván Arboleda (born 1996), footballer who represented the Colombia national team
- Pablo Armero (born 1986), footballer who represented the Colombia national team
- Emerson Batalla (born 2001), footballer
- Edward Bolaños (born 1998), footballer
- Víctor Bonilla (born 1971), footballer who represented the Colombia national team
- Fáider Burbano (born 1992), footballer
- Óscar Cabezas (born 1996), footballer
- Brayan Caicedo (born 2006), footballer
- Cristian Caicedo (born 2002), footballer
- Juan Caicedo (born 1996), footballer
- Jaminton Campaz (born 2000), footballer who represented the Colombia national team
- Mike Campaz (born 1987), footballer
- Mauricio Casierra (born 1985), footballer who represented the Colombia national team
- Byron Castillo (born 1995), footballer who represented the Ecuador national team
- Jairo Castillo (born 1977), footballer who represented the Colombia national team
- Juan Castillo (born 2000), footballer
- Augusto Vargas Cortés (born 1962), footballer who represented the Colombia national team
- Carlos Cortés (born 2001), footballer
- Maurício Cortés (born 1997), footballer
- Rolan de la Cruz (born 1984), footballer who represented the Equatorial Guinea national team
- Jefferson Cuero (born 1988), footballer
- Mauricio Cuero (born 1993), footballer
- Carlos Estrada (born 1961), footballer and manager who represented the Colombia national team
- Alessandro Frigerio (1911–1979), footballer and manager who represented the Switzerland national team
- Ménder García (born 1998), footballer
- Domingo González (1947–1979), footballer and 1972 Olympian
- Edison Hurtado (born 1972), wrestler and 2000 Olympian
- Jorge Cabezas Hurtado (born 2003), footballer
- William Hurtado (born 2004), footballer
- Víctor Ibarbo (born 1990), footballer who represented the Colombia national team
- William Matamba (born 1970), footballer
- Jhon Montaño (born 1997), footballer
- Yesenia Olaya, minister of Science, Technology and Innovation, anthropologist, pedagogist, and sociologist
- Pablo Ortiz (born 2000), footballer
- Harold Preciado (born 1994), footballer who represented the Colombia national team
- Danny Quendambú (born 1983), footballer who represented the Equatorial Guinea national team
- Deinner Quiñones (born 1995), footballer
- Jeison Quiñones (born 1986), footballer
- Luis Quiñónez (born 1968), footballer who represented the Colombia national team
- Nelson Quiñónes (born 2002), footballer
- Rodin Quiñones (born 1995), footballer
- Darwin Quintero (born 1987), footballer who represented the Colombia national team
- Kevin Rendón (born 1993), footballer
- Yamilson Rivera (born 1989), footballer
- Silvio Salazar (born 1958), long-distance runner
- John Henry Sánchez (born 1995), footballer
- Neymar Sánchez (born 2003), footballer
- Néiser Villarreal (born 2005), footballer

== See also ==
- 1979 Tumaco earthquake
