= José Cañete =

Paraguayan footballer (born 1996)

Personal information
- Full name: José Arnaldo Cañete Prieto
- Date of birth: 19 March 1996 (age 30)
- Place of birth: General Elizardo Aquino, San Pedro, Paraguay
- Height: 1.84 m (6 ft 0 in)
- Position: Defender

Senior career*
Years	Team	Apps	(Gls)
2016–2017	Olimpia	12	(0)
2017	→ Independiente FBC (loan)	7	(0)
2018	Deportivo Capiatá	11	(1)
2018	3 de Febrero	16	(2)
2019	Deportivo Santaní	7	(0)
2019	Sportivo Luqueño	1	(0)
2020	CD Olimpia	4	(1)
2023	3 de Febrero	26	(3)
2024	Magallanes	0	(0)

International career
2013	Paraguay U17	8	(0)
- * Club domestic league appearances and goals as of 21 March 2024

José Arnaldo Cañete Prieto (born 19 March 1996) is a Paraguayan footballer who plays as a defender.

== Career ==
In January 2024, he moved to Chile and joined Magallanes in the Primera B. However, Magallanes ended his contract on 21 March 2024 due to "inappropriate behaviour" against his teammates in a roast.
