= Misael Cubillos =

Chilean footballer (born 1996)

Personal information
- Full name: Misael Omar Cubillos Ramos
- Date of birth: 6 February 1996 (age 30)
- Place of birth: Iquique, Chile
- Height: 1.70 m (5 ft 7 in)
- Position: Winger

Youth career
- 2009–2012: Deportes Iquique

Senior career*
Years	Team	Apps	(Gls)
2012–2021	Deportes Iquique	94	(4)
2021	Coquimbo Unido	6	(0)
- * Club domestic league appearances and goals as of 19 May 2022

Misael Omar Cubillos Ramos (born 6 February 1996) is a Chilean footballer who last played for Coquimbo Unido in the Primera B de Chile.

== Career ==
He came to Deportes Iquique at the age of 13, after being discovered in a sport event called Juegos Bicentenario 2009, playing along with Colegio Deportivo. Along with Deportes Iquique, on 2012 he became champion of Chilean Youth Football U17 Championship, where played the Chilean international goalkeeper Brayan Cortés, too. Later, he joined to the professional squad at the age of 16, making his debut at the Chilean Primera División in a match against Palestino on January 26, 2013.

After Deportes Iquique was relegated to Primera B, on 2021 season he signed with Coquimbo Unido.

== Honours ==
=== Club ===
Deportes Iquique

- Copa Chile: 2013–14

Coquimbo Unido

- Primera B (1): 2021
