= Franco Pérez (footballer, born 1996) =

Argentine footballer

Personal information
- Full name: Franco Nicolás Pérez
- Date of birth: 1 January 1996 (age 30)
- Place of birth: Laboulaye, Argentina
- Height: 1.79 m (5 ft 10 1/2 in)
- Position: Forward

Team information
- Current team: Atlético Pantoja
- Number: 9

Youth career
- Newell's Old Boys

Senior career*
Years	Team	Apps	(Gls)
2015–2019	Newell's Old Boys	0	(0)
2016–2018	→ Morelia (loan)	0	(0)
2017–2018	→ Morelia Premier (loan)	30	(9)
2018–2019	→ Deportivo Madryn (loan)	17	(2)
2019–2021	Estudiantes RC	3	(0)
2020	→ Indep. Rivadavia (loan)	3	(0)
2021	→ FC Tucson (loan)	9	(0)
2022	Sarmiento Resistencia	21	(2)
2023–	Atlético Pantoja	13	(1)

International career
2013	Argentina U17	9	(2)
- * Club domestic league appearances and goals as of 19:45, 27 July 2023 (UTC)

Franco Nicolás Pérez (born 1 January 1996) is an Argentine professional footballer who plays as a forward for Liga Dominicana club Atlético Pantoja.

== Club career ==
Pérez began in Newell's Old Boys' youth, before appearing for the first-team in September 2015 for a victory away to Estudiantes (LP). On 31 August 2016, Liga MX side Morelia loaned Pérez. He made his professional debut with the club on 9 August 2017 during a Copa MX group stage meeting with Necaxa, he was substituted on for Jorge Zárate with twenty-seven minutes remaining and subsequently scored Morelia's goal in a 1–1 draw. He mainly featured for the club's reserve team, Morelia Premier, in Liga Premier; scoring nine in thirty appearances; including a brace over Alacranes de Durango.

Pérez returned to Newell's Old Boys in 2018, prior to joining Deportivo Madryn on loan in August. He scored goals against Alvarado and Chaco For Ever whilst with the club. July 2019 saw Pérez leave Newell's permanently, as he penned terms with Primera Nacional's Estudiantes. Six months later, after just three appearances, Pérez moved across the division to Independiente Rivadavia on loan. Three games occurred. He departed during 2020, before heading to the United States on 11 March 2021 to join USL League One side FC Tucson.

In February 2023, Pérez joined Liga Dominicana club Atlético Pantoja.

== International career ==
Pérez represented Argentina's U17s in 2013. He appeared at both the 2013 South American Under-17 Football Championship and 2013 FIFA U-17 World Cup. Pérez scored two goals at the former in Argentina, netting against Peru and Colombia as Argentina went on to win the title. He featured twice at the U17 World Cup in the United Arab Emirates, versus Canada and Mexico respectively.

== Career statistics ==
As of 12 March 2021.

Club statistics
Club	Season	League			Cup		League Cup		Continental		Other		Total	
Club	Season	Division	Apps	Goals	Apps	Goals	Apps	Goals	Apps	Goals	Apps	Goals	Apps	Goals
Newell's Old Boys	2015	Primera División	0	0	0	0	—		—		0	0	0	0
Newell's Old Boys	2016	Primera División	0	0	0	0	—		—		0	0	0	0
Newell's Old Boys	2016–17	Primera División	0	0	0	0	—		—		0	0	0	0
Newell's Old Boys	2017–18	Primera División	0	0	0	0	—		0	0	0	0	0	0
Newell's Old Boys	2018–19	Primera División	0	0	0	0	0	0	—		0	0	0	0
Newell's Old Boys	Total		0	0	0	0	0	0	0	0	0	0	0	0
Morelia (loan)	2016–17	Liga MX	0	0	0	0	—		—		0	0	0	0
Morelia (loan)	2017–18	Liga MX	0	0	2	1	—		—		0	0	2	1
Morelia (loan)	Total		0	0	2	1	—		—		0	0	2	1
Morelia Premier (loan)	2017–18	Liga Premier	30	9	—		—		—		0	0	30	9
Deportivo Madryn (loan)	2018–19	Torneo Federal A	17	2	3	0	—		—		0	0	20	2
Estudiantes	2019–20	Primera Nacional	3	0	0	0	—		—		0	0	3	0
Estudiantes	2020	Primera Nacional	0	0	0	0	—		—		0	0	0	0
Estudiantes	2021	Primera Nacional	0	0	0	0	—		—		0	0	0	0
Estudiantes	Total		3	0	0	0	—		—		0	0	3	0
Independiente Rivadavia (loan)	2019–20	Primera Nacional	3	0	0	0	—		—		0	0	3	0
FC Tucson (loan)	2021	USL League One	0	0	0	0	—		—		0	0	0	0
Career total			53	11	5	1	0	0	0	0	0	0	58	12

== Honours ==
Argentina U17

- South American Under-17 Football Championship: 2013
