= Matías Ramírez (footballer, born 1996) =

Chilean footballer

Personal information
- Full name: Matias Fernando Ramirez Palacios
- Date of birth: 5 February 1996 (age 30)
- Place of birth: Santiago, Chile
- Height: 1.69 m (5 ft 6 1/2 in)
- Position: Striker

Team information
- Current team: Deportes Recoleta
- Number: 11

Youth career
- Palestino

Senior career*
Years	Team	Apps	(Gls)
2013–2014	Palestino	9	(3)
2014–2017	Udinese	0	(0)
2014–2015	→ Granada B (loan)	0	(0)
2015	→ Palestino (loan)	1	(0)
2016	→ Everton (loan)	6	(0)
2016–2017	→ Granada B (loan)	1	(0)
2017	Huachipato	1	(0)
2018	Deportes La Serena	16	(2)
2019	Unión Compañías		
2019	Independiente de Cauquenes	14	(2)
2020–2021	Deportes Colina	13	(6)
2021–	Deportes Recoleta	0	(0)

International career
2013	Chile U17	1	(0)
2015	Chile U20	2	(0)
- * Club domestic league appearances and goals as of 20:45, 6 March 2021 (UTC)

Matías Fernando Ramirez Palacios (born 5 February 1996) is a Chilean footballer who plays for Deportes Recoleta as a striker.

== Club career ==
Born in Santiago, Ramírez was a prolific goalscorer at Palestino's youth setup. In the 2012 summer, aged only 15, he was bought by Udinese Calcio, with the deal only being completed in 2014, due to his age.

Ramírez was promoted to Palestino's first team in January 2013, and made his professional debut on 9 November, replacing Pablo Tamburrini in the 57th minute and scoring the winner in a 2–1 home success against Cobresal. He appeared in nine league games during the campaign, scoring three goals.

On 12 August 2014 Ramírez signed a five-year deal with Udinese, Granada CF's parent club, and was assigned to Granada CF B in Segunda División B.

On 26 January 2017, Matias has been released from Granada.
