= Matheus Oliveira (footballer, born 1996) =

Brazilian footballer

Personal information
- Full name: Matheus Oliveira de Souza
- Date of birth: 6 September 1996 (age 30)
- Place of birth: Rio de Janeiro, Brazil
- Height: 1.84 m (6 ft 0 in)
- Position: Defender

Team information
- Current team: Grêmio Anápolis

Youth career
- –2016: Internacional

Senior career*
Years	Team	Apps	(Gls)
2017	Tombense	4	(0)
2018	Macaé	0	(0)
2019–	Grêmio Anápolis	0	(0)

International career^{‡}
2013	Brazil U17	3	(0)
- * Club domestic league appearances and goals as of 18:02, 17 June 2019 (UTC) ‡ National team caps and goals as of 18:02, 17 June 2019 (UTC)

Matheus Oliveira de Souza (born 6 September 1996), commonly known as Matheus Oliveira, is a Brazilian footballer who currently plays as a defender for Grêmio Anápolis.

== Career statistics ==
=== Club ===
As of 17 June 2019.

Club	Season	League			State League		Cup		Other		Total	
Club	Season	Division	Apps	Goals	Apps	Goals	Apps	Goals	Apps	Goals	Apps	Goals
Tombense	2017	Série C	4	0	5 (Note: Appearances in the Campeonato Mineiro)	0	0	0	0	0	9	0
Macaé	2018	Série D	0	0	11 (Note: Appearances in the Campeonato Carioca)	0	0	0	0	0	11	0
Grêmio Anápolis	2019	–			3 (Note: Appearances in the Campeonato Goiano)	0	0	0	0	0	3	0
Career total			4	0	19	0	0	0	0	0	23	0
