= Leandro Vega =

Argentine footballer

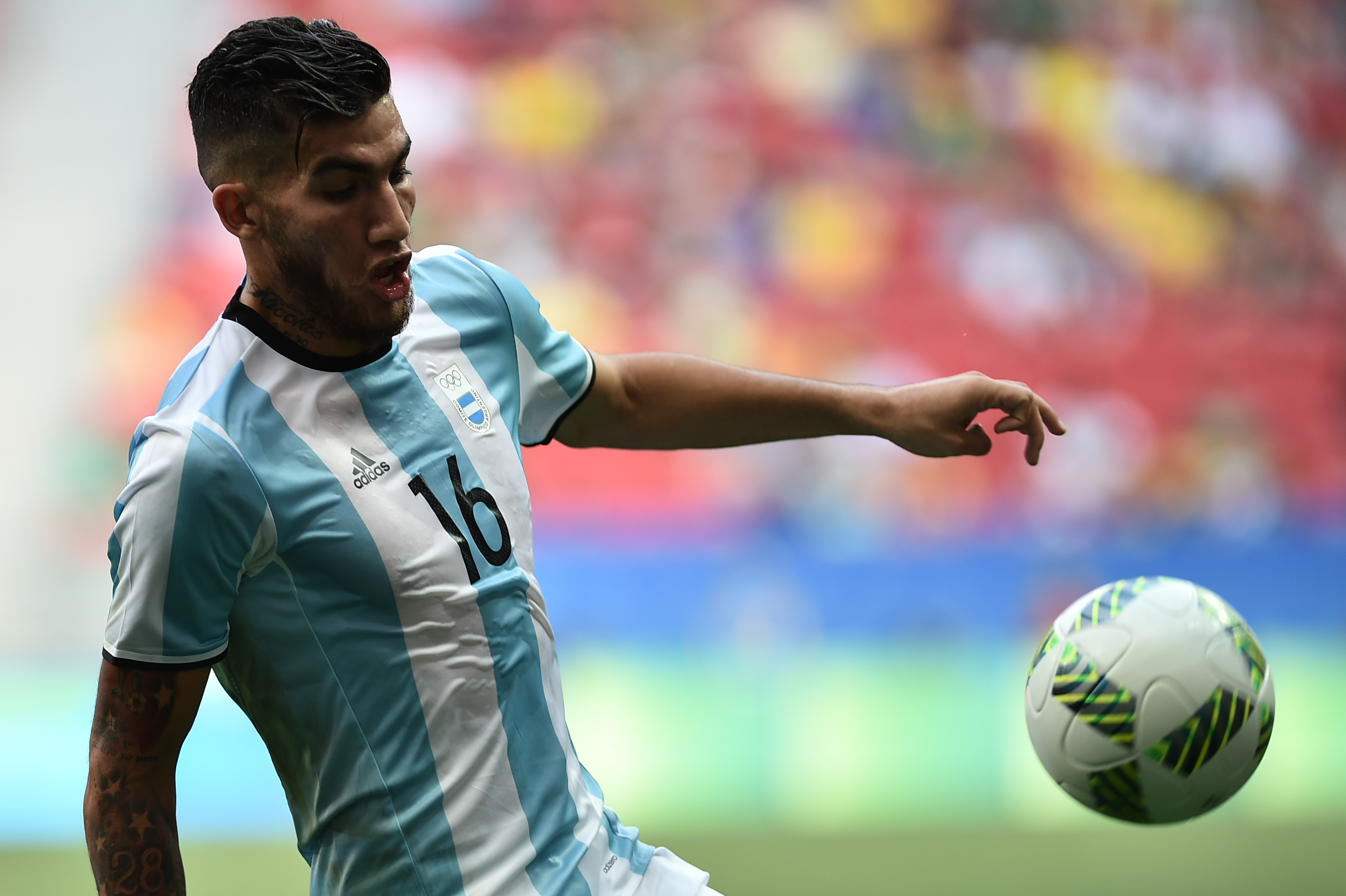

Personal information
- Full name: Leandro Sebastián Vega
- Date of birth: 27 May 1996 (age 30)
- Place of birth: José C. Paz, Buenos Aires, Argentina
- Height: 1.79 m (5 ft 10 in)
- Position: Centre back

Youth career
- River Plate

Senior career*
Years	Team	Apps	(Gls)
2015–2019	River Plate	13	(0)
2016–2017	→ Newell's Old Boys (loan)	0	(0)
2017–2018	→ San Martín SJ (loan)	18	(0)
2018–2019	→ Emelec (loan)	36	(1)
2019–2022	Emelec	34	(4)
2022	→ Deportes Antofagasta (loan)	10	(0)
2023	Racing Montevideo	5	(0)
2024	Deportivo Maipú	3	(0)
2025	Almirante Brown	3	(0)

International career
2011	Argentina U15	5	
2013	Argentina U17	14	(1)
2015	Argentina U20	7	(0)
- * Club domestic league appearances and goals as of 12 April 2024

Leandro Sebastián Vega (born 27 May 1996) is an Argentine football player who currently plays for as a centre back.

He also played for the Argentine National Youth Football Team (Under 15, Under-17 and now plays for the Argentina national under-20 football team.

== Career ==
His debut on the River Plate's first-team was on the Victory at the 2015 Copa EuroAmericana Match, where River Plate's team Won the tournament Against the Sevilla FC (one of the teams that play in Spain's top flight, La Liga)

In July 2018, Vega joined C.S. Emelec on loan from River Plate. On 20 March 2019 it was confirmed, that Emelec had acquired the player on a permanent basis. Vega penned a 4-year contract with the club.
