= Daniel Porozo =

Ecuadorian footballer (born 1997)

Daniel Guillermo Porozo Valencia (born September 20, 1997) is an Ecuadorian professional footballer who plays as a forward for Real Oruro.

== Career statistics ==
=== Club ===
As of match played 23 April 2026

Appearances and goals by club, season and competition
Club	Division	League			Cup		Continental		Total	
Club	Division	Season	Apps	Goals	Apps	Goals	Apps	Goals	Apps	Goals
Universidad Católica	Ecuadorian Serie A	2013	2	0	—		—		2	0
Universidad Católica	Ecuadorian Serie A	2014	9	0	—		0	0	9	0
Universidad Católica	Total		11	0	0	0	0	0	11	0
Deportivo Quito	Ecuadorian Serie A	2015	39	0	—		—		39	0
Celaya F.C.	Liga de Expansión MX	2015-16	2	0	2	0	—		4	0
Lobos BUAP	Liga de Expansión MX	2016-17	12	1	4	2	—		16	3
Cúcuta Deportivo	Categoría Primera B	2017	6	0	5	1	—		11	1
Clan Juvenil	Ecuadorian Serie A	2017	12	3	—		—		12	3
Deportivo Cuenca	Ecuadorian Serie A	2018	7	1	—		2	0	9	1
Gualaceo S.C.	Ecuadorian Serie B	2018	9	0	—		—		9	0
Olmedo	Ecuadorian Serie A	2020	9	0	—		—		9	0
Juventud F.C.	Segunda Categoría	2021	17	14	—		—		17	14
Aampetra	Segunda Categoría	2021	6	1	—		—		6	1
ABC F.C.	Campeonato Brasileiro Série C	2022	14	1	2	0	—		16	1
Aampetra	Segunda Categoría	2022	15	7	0	0	—		15	7
Aampetra	Total		21	8	0	0	0	0	21	8
Libertad F.C.	Ecuadorian Serie A	2023	27	5	—		—		27	5
Macará	Ecuadorian Serie A	2024	14	0	0	0	—		14	0
Independiente Petrolero	FBF División Profesional	2024	21	8	—		—		21	8
S.D. Aucas	Ecuadorian Serie A	2025	5	0	0	0	1	0	6	0
Leones	Ecuadorian Serie B	2025	17	3	1	0	—		18	3
Real Oruro	FBF División Profesional	2026	3	2	—		—		3	2
Career total			246	46	14	3	3	0	263	49

== Honours ==
ABC Futebol Clube

- Campeonato Potiguar: 2022
