= Fabrizio Buschiazzo =

Uruguayan footballer (born 1996)

Personal information
- Full name: Fabrizio Buschiazzo Morel
- Date of birth: 7 July 1996 (age 30)
- Place of birth: Juan Lacaze, Uruguay
- Height: 1.89 m (6 ft 2 in)
- Position: Defender

Team information
- Current team: Olbia
- Number: 55

Youth career
- 2009–2015: Peñarol

Senior career*
Years	Team	Apps	(Gls)
2015–2019	Peñarol	1	(0)
2016	→ Defensa y Justicia (loan)	1	(0)
2017–2018	→ Matera (loan)	17	(0)
2018–2019	→ Pisa (loan)	26	(1)
2019–2020	Siena	10	(0)
2020–2021	Casertana	27	(1)
2021–2022	Once Caldas	6	(0)
2022	Foggia	4	(0)
2022	Rentistas	11	(1)
2023–2024	Cavese	17	(1)
2024	Pompei	7	(0)

International career^{‡}
2012–2013	Uruguay U17	36	(4)
- * Club domestic league appearances and goals as of 1 January 2025 ‡ National team caps and goals as of 2 November 2013

Fabrizio Buschiazzo Morel (born 7 July 1996) is an Uruguayan footballer who plays as a defender for Italian Serie D club Olbia Calcio 1905. He also holds Italian citizenship.

== Club career ==
Buschiazzo made his Uruguayan Primera División debut for Peñarol on 20 March 2016 in a game against Racing de Montevideo.

On 6 August 2019, he signed a 3-year contract with Italian Serie C club Siena.

On 25 September 2020 he moved to Casertana.

On 14 July 2021, he joined Once Caldas in Colombia.

On 31 January 2022, Buschiazzo returned to Italy and signed a 1.5-year contract with Foggia.

On 15 July 2023, he moved to Cavese.

On 9 August 2024, he joined Pompei.

On 15 January 2025, Buschiazzo signed two years contract with Olbia Calcio 1905.

== International career ==
Buschiazzo is a former Uruguay youth international and has represented his country at under-17 level. He was also part of Uruguay squad at 2013 South American U-17 Championship and 2013 FIFA U-17 World Cup.
