= Lincoln (footballer, born 1996) =

Brazilian footballer

Personal information
- Full name: Lincoln Fernando Rocha da Silva
- Date of birth: 7 March 1996 (age 30)
- Place of birth: Rio de Janeiro, Brazil
- Height: 1.84 m (6 ft 0 in)
- Position: Defender

Youth career
- 2010–2017: Flamengo
- 2016: → Grêmio Anápolis (loan)
- 2016–2017: → Lorca Deportiva (loan)

Senior career*
| Years | Team | Apps | (Gls) |
| 2017–2018 | Lorca Deportiva | 12 | (0) |
| 2019–2020 | Tombense | 17 | (0) |
| 2020 | Barretos | 1 | (0) |

International career
| 2013 | Brazil U17 | 3 | (1) |
- * Club domestic league appearances and goals as of 14 March 2020

Lincoln Fernando Rocha da Silva (born 7 March 1996), commonly known as Lincoln, is a Brazilian footballer who currently plays as a defender.

== Career statistics ==
=== Club ===
As of 17 June 2019.

| Club | Season | League | | | State League | | Cup | | Other | | Total | |
| Club | Season | Division | Apps | Goals | Apps | Goals | Apps | Goals | Apps | Goals | Apps | Goals |
|---|---|---|---|---|---|---|---|---|---|---|---|---|
| Lorca Deportiva | 2017–18 | Segunda División B | 12 | 0 | – | | 1 (Note: Appearances in the Copa del Rey) | 0 | 0 | 0 | 13 | 0 |
| Tombense | 2019 | Série C | 2 | 0 | 10 (Note: Appearances in the Campeonato Mineiro) | 0 | 2 (Note: Appearances in the Copa do Brasil) | 0 | 0 | 0 | 14 | 0 |
| Career total | | | 14 | 0 | 10 | 0 | 3 | 0 | 0 | 0 | 27 | 0 |
