= 2011–12 in Uruguayan football =

Football in Uruguay
- Season: 2011–12

In the 2011–12 football season, the top league, Uruguayan Primera División, was won by Nacional. Progreso won the Segunda División and won promotion along with Central Español and Juventud. Three Uruguayan teams qualified for each of the 2011 Copa Sudamericana and 2012 Copa Libertadores. The national team played the first five of its qualifying matches for the 2014 FIFA World Cup, and took part in the 2011 Pan American Games, where the team lost to Argentina in the semifinal. National youth teams (U-20, U-17 and U-15) were also in action.

== National leagues ==
=== Uruguayan Primera División ===
Bella Vista	Cerrito	Cerro	Cerro Largo
Danubio	Defensor Sporting	El Tanque Sisley	Fénix
Liverpool	M. Wanderers	Nacional	Peñarol
Racing	Rampla Juniors	Rentistas	River Plate

- Apertura champion: Nacional (10th title)
  - Top scorer: Marcelo Zalayeta (8 goals)
- Clausura champion: Defensor Sporting (3rd title)
  - Top scorer: Richard Porta (14 goals)
- Overall champion: Nacional (44th title)
  - Top scorer: Richard Porta (17 goals)
- International qualifiers:
  - Copa Libertadores:
    - Group Stage: Nacional and Peñarol
    - Preliminary Round: Defensor Sporting
  - Copa Sudamericana:
    - Second Stage: Nacional and Cerro Largo
    - First Stage: Liverpool and Danubio
- Relegated: Rampla Juniors, Cerrito and Rentistas

=== Segunda División Uruguay ===
Atenas	Boston River	Central Español	Deportivo Maldonado	Huracán
Juventud	Miramar Misiones	Plaza Colonia	Rocha	Progreso
Sud América	Tacuarembó	Villa Teresa		

- Segunda División champion: Central Español (3rd title)
- Play-off winner: Progreso
- Promoted: Central Español, Juventud and Progreso
  - Top scorer: Ramón Valencio (18 goals)

=== Uruguayan Segunda División Amateur ===
Albion	Alto Perú	Basañez	Canadian	Colón
La Luz	Mar de Fondo	Oriental	Parque del Plata	Platense
Potencia	Salus	Torque	Uruguay Montevideo	

- Segunda División Amateur champion: Torque (1st title)
- Promoted: Torque
- Desafiliated: Parque del Plata

== Clubs in international competitions ==
Team \ Competition	2011 Copa Sudamericana	2012 Copa Libertadores
Bella Vista	First Stage	did not qualify
Defensor Sporting	did not qualify	Second Stage
Fénix	First Stage	did not qualify
Nacional	Second Stage	Second Stage
Peñarol	did not qualify	Second Stage

=== Bella Vista ===
2011 Copa Sudamericana

2 August 2011 First Stage	Bella Vista (Uruguay)	1–1	(Chile) Universidad Católica	Montevideo, Uruguay
19:45 UTC-03:00	Santín (yellow card) 18'; Nicolini 23' (pen.)	Report	Cereceda (yellow card) 23'; Calandria 35'	Stadium: Estadio Luis Franzini; Attendance: 5,000; Referee: Leandro Vuaden (Brazil)

16 August 2011 First Stage	Universidad Católica (Chile)	3–0	(Uruguay) Bella Vista	Santiago, Chile
19:15 UTC-04:00	Carignano 4', 64'; Mier 10'; F. Silva (yellow card) 79'	Report	Oteras (yellow card) 49'; Santín (yellow card) 57'	Stadium: Estadio San Carlos de Apoquindo; Attendance: 6,000; Referee: Víctor Hugo Carrillo (Peru)

Bella Vista eliminated on points 1–4.

=== Defensor Sporting ===
2012 Copa Libertadores

7 February 2012 Group Stage	Defensor Sporting (Uruguay)	0–3	(Argentina) Vélez Sársfield	Montevideo, Uruguay
19:45 UTC-02:00	P. Pintos (yellow card) 84'	Report	D. Ramírez 42'; Cubero (yellow card) 73'; Obolo 81'; Domínguez 86'	Stadium: Estadio Luis Franzini; Attendance: 10,000; Referee: Enrique Osses (Chile)

14 February 2012 Group Stage	Defensor Sporting (Uruguay)	2–0	(Ecuador) Deportivo Quito	Montevideo
20:00 UTC-02:00	Alemán 22'; Ferreira (yellow card) 30'; Callorda 78'	Report	Checa (yellow card) 21'; Olivo (yellow card) 57'; Paredes (yellow card) 70'; Martínez (yellow card) 82'	Stadium: Estadio Luis Franzini; Attendance: 10,000; Referee: Héber Roberto Lopes (Brazil)

13 March 2012 Group Stage	Guadalajara (Mexico)	1–0	(Uruguay) Defensor Sporting	Zapopan, Mexico
21:15 UTC-05:00	Fierro 10'; Sánchez (yellow card) 19'	Report	Diego Martín Rodríguez (yellow card) 40'; P. Pintos (yellow card) 42'; Moiraghi (yellow card) 70'	Stadium: Estadio Omnilife; Attendance: 49,000; Referee: Marlon Escalante (Venezuela)

28 March 2012 Group Stage	Defensor Sporting (Uruguay)	1–0	(Mexico) Guadalajara	Montevideo
19:45 UTC-03:00	Britos (yellow card) 55'; Olivera 70'; Moiraghi (yellow card) 72'; Alemán (yellow card) 74'; F. Pintos (yellow card) 80'	Report	Álvarez (yellow card) 31'; Nava (yellow card) 32' (yellow-red card) 39'	Stadium: Estadio Luis Franzini; Attendance: 15,000; Referee: Enrique Cáceres (Paraguay)

10 April 2012 Group Stage	Deportivo Quito (Ecuador)	2–0	(Uruguay) Defensor Sporting	Quito, Ecuador
16:30 UTC-05:00	Saritama (yellow card) 32'; Checa 36'; Bevacqua 63'	Report	F. Pintos (red card) 54'; Ferreira (yellow card) 82'	Stadium: Estadio Olímpico Atahualpa; Attendance: 30,000; Referee: Victor Hugo Carrillo (Peru)

17 April 2012 Group Stage	Vélez Sársfield (Argentina)	1–3	(Uruguay) Defensor Sporting	Buenos Aires, Argentina
20:15 UTC-03:00	Cerro (yellow card) 53'; Insúa 63' (pen.); Cubero (yellow card) 73'	Report	Olivera 6' (yellow card) 34'; Diego Martín Rodríguez 37'; Irrazabal (yellow card) 40'; Britos 46'; Ferreira (yellow card) 62'	Stadium: Estadio José Amalfitani; Attendance: 30,000; Referee: Sandro Ricci (Brazil)

Defensor Sporting eliminated by finishing in 3rd place in their group.

=== Fénix ===
2011 Copa Sudamericana

9 August 2011 First Stage	Universidad de Chile	1–0	(Uruguay) Fénix	Santiago, Chile
21:00 UTC-04:00	Marino (yellow card) 29'; Vargas (yellow card) 39' (goal) 54'	Report	Trujillo (yellow card) 7' (yellow-red card) 30'; Cardinalli (yellow card) 38'; Píriz (yellow card) 56'; Papa (yellow card) 71'	Stadium: Estadio Nacional Julio Martínez Prádanos; Attendance: 30,000; Referee: Julio Quintana (Paraguay)

18 August 2011 First Stage	Fénix (Uruguay)	0–0	Universidad de Chile	Montevideo
19:15 UTC-03:00	Ortíz (yellow card) 26'; Papa (yellow card) 28' (yellow-red card) 53'; Píriz (yellow card) 49'; Pilipauskas (yellow card) 74'	Report	Aránguiz (yellow card) 20'; Marino (red card) 35'; Acevedo (yellow card) 56'	Stadium: Estadio Luis Franzini; Attendance: 6,000; Referee: Heber Lopes (Brazil)

Fénix eliminated on points 1–4.

=== Nacional ===
2011 Copa Sudamericana

13 September 2011 Second Stage	Universidad de Chile	1–0	(Uruguay) Nacional	Santiago
21:15 UTC-03:00	Vargas 59'; M. González (yellow card) 60'; Rebolledo (yellow card) 86' (yellow-red card) 89'	Report	Rolín (yellow card) 24'; Boghossián (yellow card) 45+1'; Cabrera (yellow card) 48'; Placente (yellow card) 50'; Godoy (yellow card) 53'	Stadium: Estadio Nacional Julio Martínez Prádanos; Attendance: 40,000; Referee: Paulo Oliveira (Brazil)

21 September 2011 Second Stage	Nacional (Uruguay)	0–2 (suspended)	Universidad de Chile	Montevideo
19:15 UTC-03:00	Píriz (yellow card) 22'; Porta (yellow card) 45+2'	Report	Vargas 11' (yellow card) 18'; M. Rodríguez 12' (yellow card) 45'	Stadium: Estadio Gran Parque Central; Attendance: 27,000; Referee: Antonio Arias (Paraguay)

Nacional eliminated on points 0–6.

2012 Copa Libertadores

8 February 2012 Group Stage	Vasco da Gama (Brazil)	1–2	(Uruguay) Nacional	Rio de Janeiro, Brazil
22:00 UTC-02:00	Rodolfo (yellow card) 35'; Felipe Bastos (yellow card) 65'; Alecsandro 73'; Juninho (yellow card) 75'; Renato Silva (red card) 90'	Report	Placente (yellow card) 24'; Damonte (yellow card) 26'; Dedé 30' (o.g.); Sánchez 46'; Cabrera (yellow card) 87'; Viudez (yellow card) 90+2'	Stadium: Estádio São Januário; Attendance: 25,000; Referee: Hernando Buitrago (Colombia)

16 February 2012 Group Stage	Nacional (Uruguay)	1–2	(Paraguay) Libertad	Montevideo
20:15 UTC-02:00	Damonte (yellow card) 9'; Aguirre 23'; Placente (yellow card) 54'; Sánchez (yellow card) 83'	Report	Cáceres (yellow card) 31'; Samudio 58'; Caballero 63' (yellow card) 83'	Stadium: Estadio Gran Parque Central; Attendance: 27,000; Referee: Saúl Laverni (Argentina)

20 March 2012 Group Stage	Alianza Lima (Peru)	1–0	(Uruguay) Nacional	Lima, Peru
20:30 UTC-05:00	Fernández 15'; Quinteros (yellow card) 42'; Corrales (yellow card) 48'; Montaño (yellow card) 52'; Ramos (yellow card) 56'; Rabanal (yellow card) 90+1'	Report	Damonte (yellow card) 49' (yellow-red card) 59'; Placente (red card) 69'; Calzada (yellow card) 71'	Stadium: Estadio Alejandro Villanueva; Attendance: 30,000; Referee: Wilmar Roldán (Colombia)

27 March 2012 Group Stage	Nacional (Uruguay)	1–0	(Peru) Alianza Lima	Montevideo
20:15 UTC-03:00	Viudez (yellow card) 10' (goal) 68'; Scotti (yellow card) 25'; Torres (yellow card) 63'; Romero (yellow card) 82'	Report	Ascues (yellow card) 20'; Corrales (yellow card) 29'; Quinteros (yellow card) 44'; González (yellow card) 61'	Stadium: Estadio Centenario; Attendance: 20,000; Referee: Néstor Pitana (Argentina)

5 April 2012 Group Stage	Libertad (Paraguay)	2–1	(Uruguay) Nacional	Asunción, Paraguay
19:15 UTC-04:00	Benegas (yellow card) 18'; Nasuti (yellow card) 28'; Velázquez 65'; V. Cáceres 90'	Report	Viudez 9'; Rolín (yellow card) 49'; Píriz (yellow card) 73'; Damonte (yellow card) 90+2'	Stadium: Estadio Dr. Nicolás Leoz; Attendance: 10,000; Referee: Omar Ponce (Ecuador)

12 April 2012 Group Stage	Nacional (Uruguay)	0–1	(Brazil) Vasco da Gama	Montevideo
21:50 UTC-03:00	Álvarez (yellow card) 25'; Abero (yellow card) 69'; Damonte (yellow card) 76'	Report	Diego Souza 56'; Alecsandro (yellow card) 77'	Stadium: Estadio Gran Parque Central; Attendance: 10,000; Referee: Pablo Lunati (Argentina)

Nacional eliminated by finishing in 3rd place in their group.

=== Peñarol ===
2012 Copa Libertadores

26 January 2012 First Stage	Peñarol (Uruguay)	4–0	(Venezuela) Caracas	Montevideo
20:45 UTC-02:00	A. González (yellow card) 25'; Freitas 36'; Zalayeta 39'; João Pedro 64' (yellow card) 84'; Rodríguez (yellow card) 68'; Estoyanoff 71' (yellow card) 72'	Report	Guerra (yellow card) 22'; Meza (yellow card) 63'; F. Pérez (red card) 82'	Stadium: Estadio Centenario; Attendance: 50,000; Referee: Federico Beligoy (Argentina)

2 February 2012 First Stage	Caracas (Venezuela)	1–1	(Uruguay) Peñarol	Caracas, Venezuela
19:00 UTC-04:30	Machado (yellow card) 23'; Peraza 78'	Report	Freitas (yellow card) 26'; Estoyanoff 27'; Cristoforo (yellow card) 31'; Aguiar (yellow card) 36'	Stadium: Estadio Olímpico de la UCV; Attendance: 10,000; Referee: Sandro Ricci (Brazil)

16 February 2012 Group Stage	Godoy Cruz (Argentina)	1–0	(Uruguay) Peñarol	Mendoza, Argentina
21:30 UTC-03:00	Lértora (yellow card) 23'; Villar 51'; Ceballos (yellow card) 83'; Ramírez (yellow card) 88'	Report	González (yellow card) 18' (yellow-red card) 58'	Stadium: Estadio Malvinas Argentinas; Attendance: 20,000; Referee: Raúl Orosco (Bolivia)

21 February 2012 Group Stage	Peñarol (Uruguay)	0–4	(Colombia) Atlético Nacional	Montevideo
20:15 UTC-02:00	Cristóforo (yellow card) 34'; S. Silva (yellow card) 69'	Report	Córdoba 8', 49'; Mosquera (yellow card) 63'; Pabón 64', 77'	Stadium: Estadio Centenario; Attendance: 40,000; Referee: Carlos Amarilla (Paraguay)

6 March 2012 Group Stage		1–1	Universidad de Chile	Montevideo
20:30 UTC-02:00	Freitas 21'; D. Rodríguez (yellow card) 73'	Report	Mena (yellow card) 63'; Fernandes 34' (yellow card) 90+1'; Lorenzetti (yellow card) 90'	Stadium: Estadio Centenario; Attendance: 40,000; Referee: Omar Ponce (Ecuador)

27 March 2012 Group Stage	Universidad de Chile	2–1	(Uruguay) Peñarol	Santiago
21:30 UTC-03:00	M. Rodríguez 2', 90+1' (yellow card) 73'; Acevedo (yellow card) 20'; Hernández (yellow card) 67'; Fernandes (yellow card) 88'	Report	Freitas (yellow card) 7'; Cristóforo (yellow card) 19'; Valdez (yellow card) 32' (goal) 51'; D. Rodríguez (yellow card) 66'	Stadium: Estadio Nacional Julio Martínez Prádanos; Attendance: 40,000; Referee: Leandro Vauden (Brazil)

10 April 2012 Group Stage	Atlético Nacional (Colombia)	3–0	(Uruguay) Peñarol	Medellín, Colombia
21:00 UTC-05:00	Murillo 7'; Bernal (yellow card) 36'; Valencia (yellow card) 42'; Pabón 44'; Álvarez 59'	Report	Cristóforo (yellow card) 53'; Silva (yellow card) 56'	Stadium: Estadio Atanasio Girardot; Attendance: 45,000; Referee: Joaquín Artequera (Bolivia)

19 April 2012 Group Stage	Peñarol (Uruguay)	4–2	(Argentina) Godoy Cruz	Montevideo
22:00 UTC-03:00	Zambrana 37', 73' (yellow card) 75'; Mora 50'; Pérez 61'	Report	N. Sánchez 12' (yellow card) 85'; Sevillano 19'; S. Sánchez (yellow card) 29'; Aguilera (yellow card) 34'; Cardozo (yellow card) 53'	Stadium: Estadio Centenario; Attendance: 30,000; Referee: Ricardo Marques Ribeiro (Brazil)

Peñarol eliminated by finishing in 4th place in their group.

== National teams ==
=== Senior team ===
This section covers Uruguay's senior team matches from the end of the 2011 Copa América until the end of the 2012 Summer Olympics.

==== Friendly matches ====
2 September 2011	Croatia	0–3	Uruguay	Kharkiv, Ukraine
20:10 UTC+03:00	Yarmolenko 1'; Konoplyanka 45'	Report	González 43'; Lugano 60'; Hernández 87'	Stadium: Oblast Sports Complex Metalist; Attendance: 30,000; Referee: Björn Kuipers (Netherlands)

15 November 2011	Italy	0–1	Uruguay	Rome, Italy
16:45 UTC+01:00	Balotelli (yellow card) 50'; Chiellini (yellow card) 90+5'	Report	S. Fernández 3'; Cáceres (yellow card) 23'; Á. Pereira (yellow card) 26' (yellow-red card) 81'; Lugano (yellow card) 34'; Cavani (yellow card) 40'; Muslera (yellow card) 86'	Stadium: Stadio Olimpico; Attendance: 60,000; Referee: Duarte Nuno Pereira Gomes (Portugal)

29 February 2012	Romania	2–4	Uruguay	Bucharest, Romania
20:00 UTC+02:00	Stancu 50' (yellow card) 84'; Goian (yellow card) 70'	Report	Cavani 2'; Fucile (yellow card) 74'; Godín (yellow card) 78'	Stadium: Stadionul Național; Attendance: 50,000; Referee: Viktor Kassai (Hungary)

25 May 2012	Russia	1–3	Uruguay	Moscow, Russia
20:45 UTC+04:00	Kerzhakov 49'	Report	Suárez 48'	Stadium: Lokomotiv Stadium; Attendance: 28,000; Referee: Kevin Blom (Netherlands)

==== World Cup qualifiers ====
7 October 2011 Round 1	Uruguay	2–4	Bolivia	Montevideo
17:00 UTC-02:00	Suárez 3' (yellow card) 89'; Lugano 26', 72'; Arévalo Ríos (yellow card) 27'; Á. Pereira (yellow card) 39'; Cavani 35'; M. Pereira (yellow card) 80'	Report	Cardozo 18'; Rojas (yellow card) 28'; Gutiérrez (yellow card) 30'; Raldes (yellow card) 52'; Rivero (yellow card) 64'; Martins 86' (pen.)	Stadium: Estadio Centenario; Attendance: 25,500; Referee: Víctor Hugo Carrillo (Peru)

11 October 2011 Round 2	Paraguay	0–2	Uruguay	Asunción, Paraguay
19:45 UTC-03:00	Ó. Cardozo (yellow card) 3'; Ortíz 90+1'	Report	Godín (yellow card) 17'; M. Pereira (yellow card) 32'; Forlán 67'; Lugano (yellow card) 84'	Stadium: Estadio Defensores del Chaco; Attendance: 12,922; Referee: Wilson Seneme (Brazil)

11 November 2011 Round 3	Uruguay	2-3	Chile	Montevideo
20:00 UTC-02:00	Suárez 42', 45', 68', 74'; Cáceres (yellow card) 60'; Rodríguez (yellow card) 86'	Report	Contreras (yellow card) 40'; Medel (yellow card) 54'	Stadium: Estadio Centenario; Attendance: 40,500; Referee: Héctor Baldassi (Argentina)

2 June 2012 Round 5	Uruguay	2–2	Venezuela	Montevideo
15:00 UTC-03:00	D. Pérez (yellow card) 11'; Forlán 38'; Lugano (yellow card) 76'	Report	Rincón (yellow card) 18'; Amorebieta (yellow card) 50'; Di Giorgi (yellow card) 72'; Rondón 84'	Stadium: Estadio Centenario; Attendance: 57,000; Referee: Antonio Arias (Paraguay)

10 June 2012 Round 6	Uruguay	0-2	Peru	Montevideo
15:30 UTC-03:00	Suárez 15'; M. Pereira 30'; Suárez (yellow card) 59'; C. Rodríguez 63'; Eguren 90+4'	Report	Ramírez (yellow card) 17'; Godín 40' (o.g.); Ramos (yellow card) 43'; Guerrero 48'; Galliquio (yellow card) 64'	Stadium: Estadio Centenario; Attendance: 55,000; Referee: Leandro Vauden (Brazil)

=== Olympic team ===
==== Friendly matches ====
25 April 2012	Uruguay	0–0	Egypt	Fray Bentos, Uruguay
20:00 UTC-03:00		Report		Stadium: Estadio Parque Artigas; Attendance: 10,000; Referee: Héctor Martínez (Uruguay)

11 July 2012	Uruguay	6–4	Chile	Maldonado, Uruguay
15:30 UTC-03:00	Suárez 31', 35', 47'; Coates (yellow card) 33'; Cavani 39' (pen.), 71'; Calzada (yellow card) 44'; Aguirregaray (yellow card) 70'; Hernández 84'	Report	Henríquez 2'; Muñoz 11'; Carrasco (yellow card) 67'; Ubilla 80', 90'	Stadium: Estadio Domingo Burgueño Miguel; Attendance: 15,000; Referee: Néstor Pitana (Argentina)

15 July 2012	Uruguay	2–0	Panama	Montevideo
16:00 UTC-03:00	Cavani 2'; Ramírez 18'; Coates (yellow card) 40'	Report	Henríquez (yellow card) 9'; Vázquez (yellow card) 90+1'	Stadium: Estadio Centenario; Attendance: 10,000; Referee: Patricio Loustou (Argentina)

==== Summer Olympic Games ====
26 July 2012 Group Stage	United Arab Emirates	1–2	Uruguay	Manchester, England
17:00 UTC+01:00	Matar 23'; Ahmed (yellow card) 37'	Report	Rolín (yellow card) 9'; Ramírez 42'; Lodeiro 56'	Stadium: Old Trafford; Attendance: 51,745; Referee: Peter O'Leary (New Zealand)

29 July 2012 Group Stage	Senegal	2–0	Uruguay	London
17:00 UTC+01:00	Konaté 10', 37'; Ba (yellow card) 27' (red card) 30'; Kouyaté (yellow card) 44'; Diamé (yellow card) 46'; Badji (yellow card) 61'	Report	Ramírez (yellow card) 64'; Albín (yellow card) 68'	Stadium: Wembley Stadium; Attendance: 75,093; Referee: Felix Brych (Germany)

1 August 2012 Group Stage	Great Britain	1–0	Uruguay	Cardiff, Wales
19:45 UTC+01:00	Taylor (yellow card) 21'; Sturridge 45+1'; Ramsey (yellow card) 90+2'	Report	Ramírez (yellow card) 39'; Coates (yellow card) 51'; Suárez (yellow card) 74'; Arias (yellow card) 83'; Lodeiro (yellow card) 83'	Stadium: Millennium Stadium; Attendance: 70,438; Referee: Yuichi Nishimura (Japan)

=== Pan American team ===
==== Friendly matches ====
5 October 2011	Argentina	0–1	Uruguay	Buenos Aires
11:00 UTC-03:00		Report	Puppo 82'	Stadium: Complejo Ezeiza; Attendance: 0 Referee: Gonzalo López Aldazabal (Argentina)

==== Pan American Games ====
21 October 2011 Group Stage	Ecuador	0–1	Uruguay	Guadalajara, Mexico
13:00 UTC-05:00	Valencia (red card) 58'; Fuertes (yellow card) 67'; Anangonó (yellow card) 75'	Report	Puppo 4'; Papa (yellow card) 34' (yellow-red card) 80'; Prieto (yellow card) 51'	Stadium: Estadio Omnilife; Attendance: 1,000; Referee: Erick Andino (Honduras)

23 October 2011 Group Stage	Mexico	5–2	Uruguay	Guadalajara, Mexico
17:00 UTC-05:00	Amione 15', 48'; Ponce 29'; Zavala 42'; Peralta 71'; Mier (yellow card) 78'	Report	Gunino (yellow card) 25'; De los Santos (yellow card) 48' (yellow-red card) 63'; Prieto 51' (yellow card) 76'; Maxi Rodríguez 57'; Píriz (yellow card) 83'; Britos (yellow card) 86'	Stadium: Estadio Omnilife; Attendance: 35,000; Referee: Raúl Orosco (Bolivia)

25 October 2011 Group Stage	Uruguay	1–1	Trinidad and Tobago	Guadalajara, Mexico
13:00 UTC-05:00	Abero 16'; Viudez (yellow card) 19'; Maxi Rodríguez (yellow card) 74'	Report	Molino (yellow card) 5'; Winchester 8'; M. Joseph (yellow card) 58'; Selby (yellow card) 70'; Bateau (yellow card) 81'	Stadium: Estadio Omnilife; Attendance: 10,000; Referee: Marlon Mejía (El Salvador)

26 October 2011 Semifinals	Argentina	1–0	Uruguay	Guadalajara
20:00 UTC-05:00	Pezzella 10'; González Pirez (yellow card) 27'; Nervo (yellow card) 72'; Cirigliano (yellow card) 81'	Report	D. Rodríguez (yellow card) 21'; Prieto (yellow card) 86'	Stadium: Estadio Omnilife; Attendance: 15,000; Referee: Omar Ponce (Ecuador)

28 October 2011 Bronze Medal match	Costa Rica	1–2	Uruguay	Guadalajara
17:00 UTC-05:00	Davis (yellow card) 2'; Dawson (yellow card) 24'; Montenegro (yellow card) 76'; McDonald 81' (pen.); Sánchez (yellow card) 83'	Report	Gunino (yellow card) 44'; G. Silva 48' (yellow card) 90+2'; Píriz 61'; Albín (yellow card) 80'; Britos (yellow card) 87'; Cubero (yellow card) 90'	Stadium: Estadio Omnilife; Attendance: 45,000; Referee: Raúl Orosco (Bolivia)

=== Uruguay U-20 ===
==== World Cup ====
30 July 2011 Group Stage	Portugal	0–0	Uruguay	Cali, Colombia
20:00 UTC-05:00	Saná (yellow card) 43'; Sérgio Oliveira (yellow card) 72' (yellow-red card) 80'	Report		Stadium: Estadio Pascual Guerrero; Attendance: 35,276; Referee: Abdulrahman Mohammed Abdou (Qatar)

2 August 2011 Group Stage	Uruguay	1–1	New Zealand	Cali
17:00 UTC-05:00	Olivera (yellow card) 55'; Luna 74'	Report	Lucas (yellow card) 34'; Bevin 57'; Musa (yellow card) 83'; Branch (yellow card) 90+1'; Milne (yellow card) 90+2'	Stadium: Estadio Pascual Guerrero; Attendance: 28,889; Referee: Cüneyt Çakır (Turkey)

5 August 2011 Group Stage	Uruguay	0–1	Cameroon	Bogotá, Colombia
17:00 UTC-05:00	Cabrera (yellow card) 45+5'; Cepellini (yellow card) 90+6'; Polenta (yellow card) 90+6'	Report	Oyongo (yellow card) 10'; Mbongo 28'; Kom (yellow card) 41'	Stadium: Estadio Nemesio Camacho; Attendance: 35,745; Referee: Mark Geiger (United States)

==== Friendly matches ====
6 June 2012	Uruguay	4–2	United States	Montevideo
15:00 UTC-03:00	Bueno 10'; Mastriani 22'; Velázquez 35'; Cochran 56' (o.g.)	Report	Pineda 28'; Ocegueda (yellow card) 34'; McCrary; García 90'	Stadium: Estadio Gran Parque Central; Attendance: 600; Referee: Daniel Fedorczuk (Uruguay)

8 June 2012	Uruguay	2–0	United States	Montevideo
15:00 UTC-03:00	Silva 38'; César 60'	Report	López (yellow card) 88'	Stadium: Estadio Parque Alfredo Víctor Viera; Attendance: 400; Referee: Líber Prudente

===== Copa Provincia del Chaco =====
28 June 2012 Semifinals	Brazil	0–0 (10–9 p)	Uruguay	Resistencia, Argentina
--:-- UTC-03:00		Report		Stadium: Estadio Centenario; Attendance: 10,000; Referee: Sergio Pezzotta (Argentina)
	Penalties
	João Felipe (penalty scored); Felipe Anderson (penalty missed); Matheus (penalty scored); Giovanni (penalty scored); Luan (penalty missed); Rodrigo Caio (penalty scored); Fabinho (penalty scored); Henrique Miranda (penalty missed); Paulo Henrique (penalty scored); Wellington Carvalho (penalty scored); Luiz Gustavo (penalty scored); João Felipe (penalty scored); Felipe Anderson (penalty scored)		(penalty scored) César; (penalty scored) Silva; (penalty missed) Cristóforo; (penalty missed) Aguirre; (penalty scored) Velázquez; (penalty scored) Albarracín; (penalty scored) Moreira; (penalty missed) De León; (penalty scored) J. Varela; (penalty scored) Cubero; (penalty scored) Rodríguez; (penalty scored) César; (penalty missed) Silva

30 June 2012 Third place play-off	Chile	0–2	Uruguay	Resistencia, Argentina
18:00 UTC-03:00		Report	Mastriani 11'; Rolán 89'	Stadium: Estadio Centenario; Attendance: 12,000; Referee: Segio Pezzotta (Argentina)

=== Uruguay U-17 ===
==== Friendly matches ====
29 May 2012	Paraguay	1–1	Uruguay	Luque, Paraguay
18:00 UTC-03:00	Latorre 17'	Report	Garay 70'	Stadium: Estadio Feliciano Cáceres; Attendance: 5,000; Referee: Enrique Cáceres (Paraguay)
Note: The game ended at 78 minutes for incidents in the field.

31 May 2012	Paraguay	4–0	Uruguay	Asunción, Paraguay
18:00 UTC-03:00	Torres 35'; Cáceres 67'; Núñez 78'; Duarte 88'	Report		Stadium: Estadio Rogelio Livieres; Referee: Enrique Cáceres (Paraguay)

24 June 2012	Uruguay	5–1	Peru	Montevideo
15:00 UTC-03:00	D´Albenas 17'; Benítez 30'; Latorre 37', 44', 65'	Report	Namoc 83'	Stadium: Estadio Parque Capurro; Attendance: 100; Referee: Christian Ferreyra (Uruguay)

26 June 2012	Uruguay	1–1	Peru	Montevideo
10:00 UTC-03:00	Nadruz 90'		Jiménez 89'	Stadium: Estadio Jardines del Hipódromo; Attendance: 50; Referee: Andrés Cunha (Uruguay)

=== Uruguay U-15 ===
==== Friendly matches ====
1 October 2011	Uruguay	0–1	Peru	Trinidad, Uruguay
15:00 UTC-03:00		Report	Dartega 32'	Stadium: Estadio Lavalleja; Attendance: 300; Referee: Rubén Castromán (Uruguay)

2 October 2011	Uruguay	3–1	Peru	Canelones, Uruguay
10:00 UTC-02:00	Méndez 37'; Latorre 44'; Bufa 87'		Villalobos 49'	Stadium: Complejo Uruguay Celeste; Attendance: 0 Referee: Andrés Cunha (Uruguay)

4 October 2011	Uruguay	3–0	Peru	Montevideo
20:00 UTC-02:00	Luzardo 8'; Currais 17'; Bustello 83'	Report		Stadium: Estadio Gran Parque Central; Attendance: 700; Referee: Héctor Martínez (Uruguay)

21 September 2011	Paraguay	4–1	Uruguay	Ypané, Paraguay
15:00 UTC-03:00	F. Cáceres 9'; Durán 22'; Guirland 48'; M. González 54'	Report	Sentena 67'	Stadium: Centro de Alto Rendimiento de Ypané; Attendance: 0 Referee: Carlos Amarilla (Paraguay)

21 September 2011	Paraguay	3–0	Uruguay	Ypané
17:00 UTC-03:00	Mendieta 37', 48', 72'; Marín (red card) 51'	Report		Stadium: Centro de Alto Rendimiento de Ypané; Attendance: 0 Referee: Ubaldo Aquino (Paraguay)

23 September 2011	Paraguay	1–1	Uruguay	Ypané
15:00 UTC-03:00	Vargas 53'	Report	Acosta 17'	Stadium: Centro de Alto Rendimiento de Ypané; Attendance: 0 Referee: Epifanio González (Paraguay)

23 September 2011	Paraguay	2–1	Uruguay	Ypané
17:00 UTC-03:00	Mendieta 19' (red card) 25'; Velázquez 59'; Obregón (red card) 69'	Report	Latorre 43'	Stadium: Centro de Alto Rendimiento de Ypané; Attendance: 0 Referee: Carlos Maciel (Paraguay)

18 October 2011	Uruguay	1–1	Paraguay	Florida, Uruguay
15:00 UTC-02:00	Burgueño 48'	Report	Torres 29'	Stadium: Estadio Campeones Olímpicos; Attendance: 600; Referee: Christian Ferreira (Uruguay)

18 October 2011	Uruguay	3–1	Paraguay	Florida, Uruguay
17:00 UTC-02:00	Bregonis 7'; Latorre 17' (pen.); D’Albenas 87'	Report	Mendieta 78' (pen.)	Stadium: Estadio Campeones Olímpicos; Attendance: 600; Referee: Julio Martínez (Uruguay)

20 October 2011	Uruguay	1–3	Paraguay	Montevideo
17:00 UTC-02:00	Buffa 12'	Report	M. González 52'; Duarte 81'	Stadium: Estadio Luis Franzini; Attendance: 50; Referee: Andrés Cunha (Uruguay)

20 October 2011	Uruguay	1–2	Paraguay	Montevideo
19:00 UTC-02:00	L. Martínez 74'	Report	Zanabria 49'; Salinas 81'	Stadium: Estadio Luis Franzini; Attendance: 50; Referee: Andrés Cunha (Uruguay)

==== South American Championship ====
17 November 2011 First Group Stage	Uruguay	2–1	Venezuela	Fray Bentos, Uruguay
21:00 UTC-02:00	D'Albenas 62'; M. Benítez 65'	Report	Ponce 47'; A. Benítez (red card) 90'	Stadium: Estadio Municipal Parque Liebig's; Attendance: 6,000; Referee: Jorge Mansilla (Bolivia)

19 November 2011 First Group Stage	Uruguay	1–1	Ecuador	Fray Bentos
21:00 UTC-02:00	Latorre 32'; Bregonis (yellow card) 67'	Report	Becerra (yellow card) 40' (yellow-red card) 78'; Cevallos (yellow card) 51'; Porozo 56'; Cabezas (yellow card) 80'	Stadium: Estadio Municipal Parque Liebig's; Attendance: 3,000; Referee: Enrique Cáceres (Paraguay)

21 November 2011 First Group Stage	Uruguay	3–0	Chile	Fray Bentos
21:00 UTC-02:00	D'Albenas 6', 44'; Buschiazzo 68' (pen.)	Report		Stadium: Estadio Municipal Parque Liebig's; Attendance: 5,000; Referee: Henry Gambetta (Peru)

26 November 2011 First Group Stage	Uruguay	4–0	Argentina	Fray Bentos
21:00 UTC-02:00	Benítez 9'; Buffa 20'; Méndez 55'; D'Albenas 67'	Report		Stadium: Estadio Municipal Parque Liebig's; Attendance: 6,000; Referee: Enrique Cáceres (Paraguay)

28 November 2011 Final Group Stage	Uruguay	0–1	Colombia	Trinidad, Uruguay
21:00 UTC-02:00		Report	Rodríguez 5'	Stadium: Estadio Juan Antonio Lavalleja; Attendance: 6,000; Referee: José Argote (Venezuela)

1 December 2011 Final Group Stage	Uruguay	0–1	Argentina	Trinidad
21:00 UTC-02:00		Report	Storm 49'; Cañete (red card) 78'	Stadium: Estadio Juan Antonio Lavalleja; Attendance: 6,000; Referee: Jorge Mansilla (Bolivia)

4 December 2011 Final Group Stage	Uruguay	0–4	Brazil	Trinidad
21:00 UTC-02:00		Report	Yan Petter 21' (yellow card) 86'; Lincoln 24'; Robert 34'; Danilo (yellow card) 36'; Mosquito 40' (pen.)	Stadium: Estadio Juan Antonio Lavalleja; Attendance: 6,000; Referee: Enrique Cáceres (Paraguay)
