= 2011–12 Uruguayan Segunda División season =

Segunda División
- Season: 2011–12
- Champions: Central Español (3rd title)
- Promoted: Central Español; Juventud; Progreso
- Matches: 170
- Goals: 424 (2.49 per match)
- Top goalscorer: Ramón Valencio (18 goals)
- Biggest home win: Miramar Misiones 5–0 Progreso (19 May 2012)
- Biggest away win: Villa Teresa 0–4 Central Español (21 December 2011); Huracán 0–4 Miramar Misiones (21 April 2012)
- Highest scoring: Rocha 3–5 Progreso (10 December 2011)
- Longest winning run: 9 games: Central Español
- Longest unbeaten run: 19 games: Central Español
- Longest winless run: 12 games: Rocha; Villa Teresa
- Longest losing run: 5 games: Villa Teresa

The 2011–12 Uruguayan Segunda División is the season of second division professional of football in Uruguay. A total of 13 teams will compete; the top two teams and the winner of the Championship play-offs are promoted to the Uruguayan Primera División.

== Club information ==
Locations of the 2011–12 season teams outside Montevideo.
Locations of the 2011−12 season teams within Montevideo.

Club	City	Stadium
Atenas	San Carlos	Atenas
Boston River	Montevideo	Charrúa
Central Español	Montevideo	Parque Palermo
Deportivo Maldonado	Maldonado	Domingo Burgueño Miguel
Huracán	Montevideo	Parque Pedro Ángel Bossio
Juventud	Las Piedras	Parque Artigas
Miramar Misiones	Montevideo	Parque Luis Méndez Piana
Plaza Colonia	Colonia	Profesor Alberto Suppici
Progreso	Montevideo	Parque Abraham Paladino
Rocha	Rocha	Municipal Doctor Mario Sobrero
Sud América	Montevideo	Carlos Ángel Fossa
Tacuarembó	Tacuarembó	Ingeniero Raúl Goyenola
Villa Teresa	Montevideo	Parque Salus

=== Personnel and kits ===
Note: Flags indicate national team as has been defined under FIFA eligibility rules. Players may hold more than one non-FIFA nationality.

Team	Manager^{1}	Captain	Kit manufacturer	Shirt main sponsor
Atenas	(Uruguay) Wilmar Cabrera	(Uruguay) Gabriel Alcoba	Mass	TV cable 8 digital
Boston River	(Uruguay) Fernando Helo	(Uruguay) Marcelo De Souza	Matgeor	Buquebus
Central Español	(Uruguay) Darlyn Gayol	(Uruguay) Ronald Ramirez	Matgeor	La Selva
Deportivo Maldonado	(Uruguay) Julio Ribas	(Uruguay) Gonzalo Amarilla	Matgeor	Rinde dos
Huracán	(Uruguay) Carlos Rodao	(Uruguay) Gonzalo Ancheta	Mgr Sport	INOX
Juventud	(Uruguay) Ariel De Armas	(Uruguay) Pablo Tiscornia	Matgeor	IARA
Miramar Misiones	(Uruguay) Carlos Manta	(Uruguay) Adrián Berbia	Mgr Sport	Cymaco
Plaza Colonia	(Uruguay) Luis Matosas	(Uruguay) Alejandro Villoldo	Matgeor	Rinde dos
Progreso	(Uruguay) Leonardo Ramos	(Uruguay) Fabián Canobbio	Matgeor	Rinde dos
Rocha	(Uruguay) Fernando Alvez	(Uruguay) Leonardo Maldonado	Mgr Sport	Rutas del Sol
Sud América	(Uruguay) Alejandro Apud	(Uruguay) Fabián Yantorno	Matgeor	Las Acacias
Tacuarembó	(Uruguay) Gustavo Ferraz	(Uruguay) Walt Báez	Mgr Sport	Agencia Central
Villa Teresa	(Uruguay) Vito Beato	(Uruguay) Diego Bértola	Mgr Sport	Milwaukee

== Standings ==
Pos	Team	Pld	W	D	L	GF	GA	GD	Pts	Promotion or relegation
1	Central Español (C, P)	24	16	6	2	47	18	+29	54	Promotion to 2012–13 Primera División
2	Juventud (P)	24	12	7	5	37	22	+15	43	Promotion to 2012–13 Primera División
3	Progreso (O, P)	24	12	6	6	36	31	+5	42	Qualification to 2012 Promotion Playoff
4	Tacuarembó	24	9	10	5	28	22	+6	37	Qualification to 2012 Promotion Playoff
5	Huracán	24	9	8	7	27	32	−5	35	Qualification to 2012 Promotion Playoff
6	Miramar Misiones	24	10	4	10	38	31	+7	34	Qualification to 2012 Promotion Playoff
7	Boston River	24	7	12	5	28	23	+5	33	Qualification to 2012 Promotion Playoff
8	Atenas	24	8	8	8	30	31	−1	32	Qualification to 2012 Promotion Playoff
9	Sud América	24	6	9	9	23	24	−1	27	Qualification to 2012 Promotion Playoff
10	Plaza Colonia	24	7	6	11	28	39	−11	27	Qualification to 2012 Promotion Playoff
11	Deportivo Maldonado	24	6	8	10	27	30	−3	26	
12	Rocha	24	5	4	15	28	51	−23	21 (Note: Rocha won the points against Villa Teresa because their goalkeeper (Enzo Trillas) played without valid medical card)	
13	Villa Teresa	24	2	6	16	19	42	−23	11	

Updated to match(es) played on 26 May 2012. Source: Soccerway
Rules for classification: 1st points; 2nd goal difference; 3rd goals scored; 4th head-to-head points; 5th head-to-head goal difference; 6th head-to-head goals scored. This does not apply to determining the champion. If two or more teams had been tied in point at the end of the tournament, a playoff would have been held at a neutral venue within 72 hours for the championship
(C) Champions; (O) Play-off winners; (P) Promoted

== Results ==
Home \ Away	ATE	BSR	CES	DPM	HUR	JUV	MMI	PZA	PRO	RCH	IASA	TAC	VTE
Atenas		1–1	2–3	0–2	0–0	3–1	2–2	1–2	1–1	1–0	1–2	1–1	5–2
Boston River	2–0		1–3	1–1	2–0	0–0	0–0	1–1	1–1	3–0	1–1	2–0	1–1
Central Español	0–0	1–0		3–2	1–1	1–1	2–1	2–0	2–1	4–0	0–0	5–1	3–1
Deportivo Maldonado	0–1	0–0	0–2		1–1	1–3	2–1	1–2	3–0	2–2	1–0	1–1	3–0
Huracán	2–1	1–1	1–0	1–0		1–1	0–4	0–2	2–3	3–0	0–3	1–2	3–2
Juventud	4–1	2–1	1–1	0–0	2–2		4–1	4–0	0–1	2–0	3–1	1–0	1–2
Miramar Misiones	1–1	1–2	0–2	3–1	1–2	0–2		3–1	5–0	2–1	2–0	1–0	1–1
Plaza Colonia	1–2	0–1	2–4	1–0	0–1	1–2	1–3		2–1	2–1	0–0	1–1	1–1
Progreso	1–4	1–1	0–0	3–1	4–1	2–0	1–0	4–2		3–0	1–1	0–2	1–0
Rocha	0–1	3–2	1–2	2–2	0–0	1–2	3–4	4–3	3–5		2–1	3–2	1–0
Sud América	3–0	1–1	1–2	3–2	1–2	0–0	1–2	0–1	0–1	1–0		1–1	1–0
Tacuarembó	0–0	2–0	1–0	0–0	1–1	2–0	1–0	1–1	0–0	3–0	0–0		3–1
Villa Teresa	0–1	2–3	0–4	0–1	0–1	0–1	1–0	1–1	0–1	1–1	1–1	2–3	

Updated to match(es) played on 26 May. Source:
Legend: Blue = home team win; Yellow = draw; Red = away team win.

== Promotion playoff ==
Quarterfinals
3	Progreso	3	1	4
10	Plaza Colonia	1	0	1
6	Miramar Misiones	0	4	4
7	Boston River	1	0	0
5	Huracán	1	1	2
8	Atenas	1	0	0
4	Tacuarembó	0	2	2
9	Sud América	0	1	1

Semifinals
3	Progreso	1	0	1
6	Miramar Misiones	0	0	0
5	Huracán (pen.)	2	1	3 (5)
4	Tacuarembó	2	1	3 (4)

Final
3	Progreso (pen.)	3	0	3 (3)
5	Huracán	1	2	3 (2)

Updated as of games played on June 30, 2012.

=== Promotion Playoff Finals ===
Huracán and Progreso qualified to the promotion playoff finals by winning their respectively matches by a single-elimination format, with each tie played over two legs.

First Leg

23 June 2012

Huracán	1–3	Progreso
Fagundez 87'		C. Canobbio 13'; F. Canobbio 70'; Millacet 90+2'

Estadio Olímpico, Montevideo
Attendance: 2,700
Referee: Roberto Silvera

Second Leg

30 June 2012

Progreso	0–2	Huracán
		Anastasía 31'; Molina 65'
Penalties
Canobbio (penalty scored); Gaitán (penalty scored); Millacet (penalty missed); Silva (penalty scored)	3–2	(penalty missed) Buongiorno; (penalty scored) Pellejero; (penalty missed) Hernández; (penalty scored) Molina; (penalty missed) Rivero

Parque Abraham Paladino, Montevideo
Attendance: 3,500
Referee: Martín Vázquez

Progreso won the match via penalties and became promoted to the 2012–13 Primera División.

== Top goalscorers ==
Rank	Player	Nationality	Club	Goals
1	Ramón Valencio	Uruguayan	Central Español	18
2	Sergio Souza	Uruguayan	Central Español	13
3	Miguel Puglia	Uruguayan	Juventud	12
4	Sebastián Fernández	Uruguayan	Miramar Misiones	10
4	Santiago Bello	Uruguayan	Deportivo Maldonado	10

== See also ==
- 2011–12 in Uruguayan football
