= 2015–16 Getafe CF season =

Getafe CF
2015–16 season
- President: Ángel Torres
- Head coach: Fran Escribá
- Stadium: Coliseum Alfonso Pérez
- La Liga: 19th (relegated)
- Copa del Rey: Round of 32
- Top goalscorer: League: Pablo Sarabia (7); All: Pablo Sarabia (7)
Home colours	Away colours	Third colours

The 2015–16 season was the 33rd season in Getafe CF 's history and the 12th in the top-tier.

== Team information ==
=== Current squad ===
As of 31 August 2015

Note: Flags indicate national team as defined under FIFA eligibility rules; some limited exceptions apply. Players may hold more than one non-FIFA nationality.

No.	Pos.	Nation	Player
1	GK	HUN	Balázs Megyeri
2	DF	ESP	Alexis
3	DF	ESP	Roberto Lago
4	DF	URU	Emiliano Velázquez (on loan from Atlético Madrid)
5	DF	ARG	Santiago Vergini (on loan from Sunderland)
6	DF	ESP	Cala
7	MF	ESP	Ángel Lafita
8	MF	ALG	Mehdi Lacen
9	FW	ESP	Álvaro Vázquez
10	MF	ESP	Pablo Sarabia
11	MF	FRA	Karim Yoda
12	FW	SRB	Stefan Šćepović (on loan from Celtic)

No.	Pos.	Nation	Player
13	GK	ESP	Vicente Guaita
14	MF	ESP	Pedro León (captain)
15	DF	ESP	Carlos Vigaray
16	FW	FRA	Bertrand Fontaine
17	MF	GHA	Bernard Mensah (on loan from Atlético Madrid)
18	MF	ESP	Víctor Rodríguez (on loan from Elche)
19	DF	URU	Damián Suárez
21	MF	ESP	Moi Gómez (on loan from Villarreal)
22	MF	ESP	Juan Rodríguez
23	MF	ESP	Álvaro Medrán (on loan from Real Madrid)
30	MF	BRA	Wanderson
32	FW	ARG	Emi

=== Staff and board ===
- Manager: Fran Escribá
- Assistant manager: Javier Casquero
- Goalkeeper coach: Emilio López
- Fitness coach: Oscar García Hermo
- President: Ángel Torres Sánchez
- Vice President: Agustín Clemente Alonso

=== Stadium information ===
- Name – Coliseum Alfonso Pérez
- City – Getafe
- Capacity – 18,000
- Inauguration – 1998
- Pitch size – 105 x 68 m
- Other Facilities: – Ciudad Deportiva

=== Kit information ===
Getafe wear their traditional blue strip. Small strips of white and red also tend to be incorporated in their kit. Generally, their away strip is red, however this has changed in recent years. Their shirt manufacturer is Joma.

== Competitions ==
=== Overall ===
Competition	Started round	Final position / round	First match	Last match
La Liga	–			
Copa del Rey	Round of 32			

Updated to match played 6 August 2015
Source: Competitions

=== Overview ===
Competition	Record							
Competition	Pld	W	D	L	GF	GA	GD	Win %
La Liga	38	9	9	20	37	67	−30	23.68
Copa del Rey	2	1	0	1	3	3	+0	50.00
Total	40	10	9	21	40	70	−30	25.00

Last updated: 15 May 2016
Source: Competitions

=== La Liga ===
==== League table ====
Pos	Team	Pld	W	D	L	GF	GA	GD	Pts	Qualification or relegation
16	Granada	38	10	9	19	46	69	−23	39 (Note: Granada finished ahead of Sporting Gijón on head-to-head record; Granada 2–0 Sporting Gijón, Sporting Gijón 3–3 Granada.)	
17	Sporting Gijón	38	10	9	19	40	62	−22	39	
18	Rayo Vallecano (R)	38	9	11	18	52	73	−21	38	Relegation to Segunda División
19	Getafe (R)	38	9	9	20	37	67	−30	36	Relegation to Segunda División
20	Levante (R)	38	8	8	22	37	70	−33	32	Relegation to Segunda División

Source: La Liga, Soccerway
Rules for classification: 1) Points; 2) Head-to-head points; 3) Head-to-head goal difference; 4) Goal difference; 5) Goals scored; 6) Fair-play points; 7) Play-off.
(R) Relegated

==== Results summary ====
Overall								Home						Away					
Pld	W	D	L	GF	GA	GD	Pts	W	D	L	GF	GA	GD	W	D	L	GF	GA	GD
38	9	9	20	37	67	−30	36	6	7	6	23	20	+3	3	2	14	14	47	−33

Last updated: 15 May 2016.

==== Result round by round ====
Round	1	2	3	4	5	6	7	8	9	10	11	12	13	14	15	16	17	18	19	20	21	22	23	24	25	26	27	28	29	30	31	32	33	34	35	36	37	38
Ground	A	H	A	H	A	H	A	H	A	H	A	H	A	H	A	H	H	A	H	H	A	H	A	H	A	H	A	H	A	H	A	H	A	H	A	A	H	A
Result	L	L	L	W	L	W	D	W	L	L	L	D	W	L	D	D	D	W	W	W	L	L	L	L	L	L	L	D	L	D	L	L	L	W	D	W	D	L
Position	18	19	20	14	17	13	14	11	13	14	15	16	13	15	15	15	15	13	12	10	10	11	12	13	14	15	17	16	18	18	19	19	20	19	19	19	17	19

Updated to match(es) played on 15 May 2016. Source:
A = Away; H = Home; W = Win; D = Draw; L = Loss

==== Matches ====
Win Draw Loss

22 August 2015 1	Espanyol	1–0	Getafe	Cornellà de Llobregat
21:30 (UTC+2)	Sevilla 3'; Arbilla (yellow card) 56'; Sánchez (yellow card) 63'	Report	Vergini (yellow card) 47' (yellow-red card) 82'; Sarabia (yellow card) 48'; Pedro León (yellow card) 52'; Medrán (yellow card) 79'	Stadium: Cornellà-El Prat; Attendance: 14,575; Referee: Jesús Gil Manzano

28 August 2015 2	Getafe	1–2	Granada	Getafe
22:30 (UTC+2)	Emi (yellow card) 5'; Velázquez (yellow card) 25'; Suárez (yellow card) 31'; Alexis (yellow card) 40'; Vázquez (yellow card) 70'; Lafita 80'	Report	El-Arabi 26' (pen.); Success 29'; Márquez (yellow card) 73'; Biraghi (yellow card) 87'; Piti (yellow card) 90+1'	Stadium: Coliseum Alfonso Pérez; Attendance: 4,532; Referee: Eduardo Prieto Iglesias

13 September 2015 3	Athletic Bilbao	3–1	Getafe	Bilbao
16:00 (UTC+2)	Aduriz 6', 83'; García 23'; San José (yellow card) 72'	Report	Lafita (yellow card) 48'; Velázquez 69', (yellow card) 83'; Lago (yellow card) 76'; Alexis (yellow card) 83'	Stadium: San Mamés; Attendance: 39,003; Referee: Pedro Pérez Montero

18 September 2015 4	Getafe	1–0	Málaga	Getafe
20:30 CEST	Šćepović 2'; Velázquez (yellow card) 33'; Medrán (yellow card) 36'; Lago (yellow card) 43'; Lacen (yellow card) 81'; V. Rodríguez (yellow card) 90+4'	Report		Stadium: Coliseum Alfonso Pérez; Attendance: 5,808; Referee: José María Sánchez Martínez

22 September 2015 5	Atlético Madrid	2–0	Getafe	Madrid
20:00 CEST (UTC+02:00)	Siqueira (yellow card) 2'; Griezmann 4', 90'; Gabi (yellow card) 40'; Tiago (yellow card) 72'	Report	Alexis (yellow card) 35'; Lafita (yellow card) 79'	Stadium: Vicente Calderón; Attendance: 41,152; Referee: Alfonso Álvarez Izquierdo

27 September 2015 6	Getafe	3–0	Levante	Getafe
18:15 CEST (UTC+02:00)	Medrán (yellow card) 3'; Noblejas (yellow card) 7'; Vázquez 81', 90+2'; Emi 90+1'	Report	Camarasa (yellow card) 21'; Feddal (yellow card) 46'; Toño (yellow card) 73'	Stadium: Coliseum Alfonso Pérez; Attendance: 5,854; Referee: Santiago Jaime Latre

2 October 2015 7	Celta Vigo	0–0	Getafe	Vigo
20:30 CEST (UTC+02:00)	Nolito (yellow card) 44'	Report	Vergini (yellow card) 43'; Vigaray (yellow card) 52'; Emi (yellow card) 89'; J. Rodríguez (yellow card) 90'; Šćepović (yellow card) 90+4'	Stadium: Balaídos; Attendance: 18,000; Referee: Eduardo Prieto Iglesias

18 October 2015 8	Getafe	4–0	Las Palmas	Getafe
18:15 CEST (UTC+02:00)	V. Rodríguez 3'; Sarabia 11', (yellow card) 56'; Vergini (yellow card) 49'; Šćepović 86', 90+3'	Report	Mubarak (yellow card) 22'; Culio (red card) 80'	Stadium: Coliseum Alfonso Pérez; Attendance: 5,797; Referee: David Fernández Borbalán

24 October 2015 9	Sevilla	5–0	Getafe	Seville
20:30 CEST (UTC+02:00)	Gameiro 35', 45', 60' (pen.); Banega 50' (pen.); Iborra (yellow card) 51'; Konoplyanka 81' (pen.)	Report	Vigaray (yellow card) 49' (yellow-red card) 59'; J. Rodríguez (yellow card) 52'	Stadium: Ramón Sánchez Pizjuán; Attendance: 34,658; Referee: Iñaki Vicandi Garrido

31 October 2015 10	Getafe	0–2	Barcelona	Getafe
20:30 CET (UTC+01:00)	Alexis (yellow card) 39'; J. Rodríguez (yellow card) 43'; D. Suárez (yellow card) 47'	Report	L. Suárez 37'; Neymar 58'	Stadium: Coliseum Alfonso Pérez; Attendance: 10,009; Referee: Juan Martínez Munuera

7 November 2015 11	Eibar	3–1	Getafe	Eibar
20:30 CET (UTC+01:00)	Enrich 16', 29'; Saúl (yellow card) 51', (goal) 61' (pen.); Capa (yellow card) 52'; Escalante (yellow card) 84'	Report	V. Rodríguez 22'; Suárez (red card) 60'; Alexis (yellow card) 90+3'	Stadium: Ipurua; Attendance: 5,333; Referee: Ignacio Iglesias Villanueva

23 November 2015 12	Getafe	1–1	Rayo Vallecano	Getafe
20:30 CET (UTC+01:00)	Vázquez (yellow card) 54'; Vigaray (yellow card) 72'; Šćepović (yellow card) 83'; J. Rodríguez (yellow card) 89'; Yoda (yellow card) 90+2'	Report	Baena (yellow card) 27'; Guerra (yellow card) 35'; Trashorras (yellow card) 50'; Jozabed 73', (yellow card) 90+2'	Stadium: Coliseum Alfonso Pérez; Attendance: 5,088; Referee: Ricardo de Burgos Bengoetxea

29 November 2015 13	Getafe	2–0	Villarreal	Getafe
12:00 CET (UTC+01:00)	Lafita (yellow card) 17', (goal) 21'; Cala (yellow card) 34'; Vázquez 51'; J. Rodríguez (yellow card) 65'; Lacen (yellow card) 78'	Report	Ruiz (yellow card) 5'; Bailly (yellow card) 85'	Stadium: Coliseum Alfonso Pérez; Attendance: 5,903; Referee: José González González

5 December 2015 14	Real Madrid	4–1	Getafe	Madrid
16:00 CET (UTC+01:00)	Benzema 4', 16'; Bale 35'; Danilo (yellow card) 37'; Ronaldo 38'	Report	Alexis 70'	Stadium: Santiago Bernabéu; Attendance: 64,897; Referee: Antonio Mateu Lahoz

11 December 2015 15	Getafe	1–1	Real Sociedad	Getafe
20:30 CET (UTC+01:00)	Lacen (yellow card) 36'; Sarabia 46'; Cala (yellow card) 68'; Alexis (yellow card) 72'	Report	De la Bella (yellow card) 14'; Canales (yellow card) 59'; Agirretxe 67'; Illarramendi (yellow card) 72'	Stadium: Coliseum Alfonso Pérez; Attendance: 5,654; Referee: Pedro Pérez Montero

19 December 2015 16	Valencia	2–2	Getafe	Valencia
16:00 CET (UTC+01:00)	Danilo (yellow card) 9'; Alcácer 15'; Mina 35'; Barragán (yellow card) 81'	Report	Sarabia 10'; Lago (yellow card) 14'; Lafita 22', (yellow card) 90+3'; Alexis (yellow card) 45+1'; Pedro León (yellow card) 77'; Suárez (yellow card) 79'; J. Rodríguez (yellow card) 85'	Stadium: Mestalla; Attendance: 31,598; Referee: David Fernández Borbalán

30 December 2015 17	Getafe	0–0	Deportivo La Coruña	Getafe
20:30 CET (UTC+01:00)	J. Rodríguez (yellow card) 49'; Lafita (yellow card) 54'; Lago (yellow card) 90+2'	Report	Cartabia (yellow card) 70'	Stadium: Coliseum Alfonso Pérez; Attendance: 5,667; Referee: Alberto Undiano Mallenco

4 January 2016 18	Sporting Gijón	1–2	Getafe	Gijón
20:30 CET (UTC+01:00)	Sanabria 16'; López (yellow card) 29'; Meré (yellow card) 57'; Halilović (yellow card) 90+3'	Report	Suárez (yellow card) 25'; Cala (yellow card) 52', (goal) 69'; Sarabia 71'; Wanderson (yellow card) 89'	Stadium: El Molinón; Attendance: 20,948; Referee: Xavier Estrada Fernández

9 January 2016 19	Getafe	1–0	Real Betis	Getafe
18:15 CET (UTC+01:00)	Vázquez 57'; Guaita (yellow card) 89'	Report	Piccini (yellow card) 54'; Vargas (yellow card) 62'; Pezzella (yellow card) 90+3'	Stadium: Coliseum Alfonso Pérez; Attendance: 6,940; Referee: Alfonso Álvarez Izquierdo

17 January 2016 20	Getafe	3–1	Espanyol	Getafe
18:15 CET (UTC+01:00)	Pedro León 29'; Sarabia 37'; Cala (yellow card) 55'; Vázquez (yellow card) 61'; Gómez 90+4'	Report	Pérez 26', (yellow card) 74'; Roco (yellow card) 65'	Stadium: Coliseum Alfonso Pérez; Attendance: 6,540; Referee: Carlos Clos Gómez

23 January 2016 21	Granada	3–2	Getafe	Granada
20:30 CET (UTC+01:00)	Rico 27', (yellow card) 77'; El-Arabi 36'; Kelava (yellow card) 76'; Rochina 77', (yellow card) 79'	Report	Šćepović 71', (yellow card) 89'; Gómez 74'; Wanderson (yellow card) 81'; Lacen (yellow card) 89'	Stadium: Los Cármenes; Attendance: 15,448; Referee: Ricardo de Burgos Bengoetxea

30 January 2016 22	Getafe	0–1	Athletic Bilbao	Getafe
18:15 CET (UTC+01:00)	Cala (yellow card) 28' (yellow-red card) 90+2'; Lago (yellow card) 29'; Velázquez (yellow card) 76'	Report	Williams 24'; Etxeita (yellow card) 61'; De Marcos (yellow card) 72'; Balenziaga (yellow card) 79'; San José (yellow card) 79'; Beñat (yellow card) 90'	Stadium: Coliseum Alfonso Pérez; Attendance: 9,503; Referee: Xavier Estrada Fernández

5 February 2016 23	Málaga	3–0	Getafe	Málaga
20:30 CET (UTC+01:00)	Juanpi 9', (yellow card) 47'; Atsu 23'; Recio (yellow card) 29'; Charles 43'; Horta (yellow card) 82'	Report	Lacen (yellow card) 27'; J. Rodríguez (yellow card) 51'; Vergini (yellow card) 88'	Stadium: La Rosaleda; Attendance: 20,268; Referee: Juan Martínez Munuera

14 February 2016 24	Getafe	0–1	Atlético Madrid	Getafe
18:15 CET (UTC+01:00)	Sarabia (yellow card) 32'; Pedro León (yellow card) 40'	Report	Torres 2'; Koke (yellow card) 44'; Gabi (yellow card) 65'; Giménez (yellow card) 67'	Stadium: Coliseum Alfonso Pérez; Attendance: 8,512; Referee: Antonio Mateu Lahoz

21 February 2016 25	Levante	3–0	Getafe	Valencia
20:30 (UTC+1)	Morales 10'; Rossi 43' (pen.); Deyverson (yellow card) 45+1'; Verza (yellow card) 68'; Verdú 81'	Report	Vergini (yellow card) 42'; Guaita (yellow card) 45+1'	Stadium: Ciutat de València; Attendance: 13,665; Referee: José González González

28 February 2016 26	Getafe	0–1	Celta Vigo	Getafe
18:15 CET (UTC+01:00)	Velázquez (yellow card) 18'; Yoda (yellow card) 42'; Emi (yellow card) 52'	Report	Guidetti (yellow card) 42'; Hernández (yellow card) 58'; Nolito 71'; Aspas (yellow card) 78'; Mallo (yellow card) 81'	Stadium: Coliseum Alfonso Pérez; Attendance: 5,652; Referee: David Fernández Borbalán

1 March 2016 27	Las Palmas	4–0	Getafe	Las Palmas
22:00 CET (UTC+01:00)	Willian José 7', (yellow card) 90'; Bigas (yellow card) 25'; Viera 28' (pen.); Aythami (yellow card) 42'; Tana 49', 83'; Mesa (yellow card) 82'	Report	Lacen (yellow card) 27'; Pereira (yellow card) 30' (yellow-red card) 65'; Vázquez (yellow card) 77'	Stadium: Gran Canaria; Attendance: 15,819; Referee: Mario Melero López

5 March 2016 28	Getafe	1–1	Sevilla	Getafe
20:30 CET (UTC+01:00)	Emi (yellow card) 53'; Sarabia (yellow card) 71'; Velázquez (yellow card) 78', (goal) 86'; Cala (yellow card) 90+2'; Vázquez (yellow card) 90+2'	Report	Nzonzi (yellow card) 55'; Carriço (yellow card) 73'; Banega 79'	Stadium: Coliseum Alfonso Pérez; Attendance: 6,478; Referee: Eduardo Prieto Iglesias

12 March 2016 29	Barcelona	6–0	Getafe	Barcelona
16:00 CET (UTC+01:00)	J. Rodríguez 8' (o.g.); Messi 40'; Munir 19'; Neymar 32', 51'; Turan 57'	Report	Velázquez (yellow card) 10'; Medrán (yellow card) 42'; Pedro León (yellow card) 50'	Stadium: Camp Nou; Attendance: 87,533; Referee: Pedro Pérez Montero

18 March 2016 30	Getafe	1–1	Eibar	Getafe
20:30 CET (UTC+01:00)	Velázquez 7'; Pereira (yellow card) 65'	Report	Adrián (yellow card) 20'; Ramis (yellow card) 46'; Borja 87'	Stadium: Coliseum Alfonso Pérez; Attendance: 6,557; Referee: Ignacio Iglesias Villanueva

3 April 2016 31	Rayo Vallecano	2–0	Getafe	Madrid
20:30 (UTC+1)	Yoel (red card) 15'; Guerra 15', (yellow card) 69'; Baena (yellow card) 38'; Miku 71'; Tito (yellow card) 72'; Manucho (yellow card) 90+1'	Report	J. Rodríguez (yellow card) 37'; Vigaray (yellow card) 40'; Sarabia (yellow card) 45+1'; Cala (yellow card) 53'; Vergini (yellow card) 90+1'	Stadium: Campo de Vallecas; Attendance: 12,581; Referee: Santiago Jaime Latre

10 April 2016 32	Villarreal	2–0	Getafe	Vilarreal
18:15 (UTC+1)	Suárez 15'; Rukavina (yellow card) 26'; Bakambu 84'; Bruno (yellow card) 90'	Report	Cala (yellow card) 35'; Medrán (yellow card) 68'	Stadium: El Madrigal; Attendance: 17,570; Referee: Alberto Undiano Mallenco

16 April 2016 33	Getafe	1–5	Real Madrid	Getafe
16:00 CEST (UTC+02:00)	Suárez (yellow card) 43'; Vázquez (yellow card) 61'; Pedro León (yellow card) 78'; Gómez (yellow card) 81'; Sarabia 84'	Report	Benzema 29'; Isco 40'; Bale 50'; Rodríguez 88'; Ronaldo 90+2'	Stadium: Coliseum Alfonso Pérez; Attendance: 11,401; Referee: Alfonso Álvarez Izquierdo

20 April 2016 34	Real Sociedad	1–2	Getafe	San Sebastián
20:30 CET (UTC+01:00)	Vela 19'; Oier (yellow card) 59'; Granero (yellow card) 83'	Report	J. Rodríguez (yellow card) 8'; Lago (yellow card) 11'; Sarabia 45'; Vázquez 56'; Emi (yellow card) 57'; Miguel Ángel (yellow card) 59'	Stadium: Anoeta; Attendance: 14,334; Referee: José María Sánchez Martínez

24 April 2016 35	Getafe	2–2	Valencia	Getafe
18:15 CEST (UTC+02:00)	Sarabia (yellow card) 26'; Gómez (yellow card) 38'; Medrán 59'; Šćepović 68'; Lacen (yellow card) 70'; Suárez (yellow card) 86'	Report	Gomes (yellow card) 39'; Parejo 48'; Alcácer 84'	Stadium: Coliseum Alfonso Pérez; Attendance: 11,637; Referee: Ricardo de Burgos Bengoetxea

1 May 2016 36	Deportivo	0–2	Getafe	A Coruña
18:15 CEST (UTC+01:00)	Borges (yellow card) 19' (yellow-red card) 64'; Navarro (yellow card) 75'	Report	Lacen (yellow card) 20'; Sarabia (yellow card) 27'; Pedro León 41'; Vigaray (yellow card) 50', (goal) 85'; Cala (yellow card) 72'; Medrán (yellow card) 73'; Gómez (yellow card) 90+3'	Stadium: Riazor; Attendance: 25,007; Referee: Carlos Clos Gómez

8 May 2016 37	Getafe	1–1	Sporting Gijón	Getafe
17:00	Vergini (yellow card) 32'; Vigaray (yellow card) 47'; Šćepović 80'; Cala (yellow card) 90+4'	Report	Cases (yellow card) 20' (yellow-red card) 56'; Álvarez 50'; Lora (yellow card) 79'	Stadium: Coliseum Alfonso Pérez; Attendance: 13,028; Referee: Alfonso Álvarez Izquierdo

15 May 2016 38	Real Betis	2–1	Getafe	Seville
17:00 (UTC+1)	Petros (yellow card) 35'; Pezzella 56'; Castro 73' (pen.)	Report	J. Rodríguez (yellow card) 52'; Vergini (yellow card) 53'; Cala (yellow card) 55'; Pereira (yellow card) 66'; Medrán (yellow card) 71', (goal) 84'; Suárez (yellow card) 73'; Emi (red card) 75'; Šćepović (yellow card) 83'; Yoda (yellow card) 89'	Stadium: Benito Villamarín; Attendance: 39,381; Referee: Jesús Gil Manzano

== See also ==
2015–16 La Liga
