= 2014–15 Getafe CF season =

Getafe CF
2014–15 season
- President: Ángel Torres
- Head coach: Cosmin Contra (until 4 January); Quique Sánchez Flores (from 5 January to 26 February); Pablo Franco (from 26 February)
- Stadium: Coliseum Alfonso Pérez
- La Liga: 15th
- Copa del Rey: Quarter-finals
- Top goalscorer: League: Álvaro Vázquez (7); All: Álvaro Vázquez (9)
- Highest home attendance: 11,500
- Lowest home attendance: 3,500
| Home colours | Away colours | Third colours |

The 2014–15 Getafe CF season was the 32nd season in club history and its 11th in the top-flight La Liga.

== Squad statistics ==
=== Appearances and goals ===
Updated as of 30 May 2015.

| No. | Pos | Nat | Player | Total | | La Liga | | Copa del Rey | |
| No. | Pos | Nat | Player | Apps | Goals | Apps | Goals | Apps | Goals |
|---|---|---|---|---|---|---|---|---|---|
| 1 | GK | (Spain) ESP | Jonathan López | 7 | 0 | 4 | 0 | 3 | 0 |
| 2 | DF | (Spain) ESP | Alexis | 32 | 1 | 28+1 | 1 | 3 | 0 |
| 3 | DF | (Spain) ESP | Roberto Lago | 19 | 0 | 11+5 | 0 | 1+2 | 0 |
| 4 | DF | (Uruguay) URU | Emiliano Velázquez | 32 | 1 | 27 | 1 | 4+1 | 0 |
| 5 | DF | (Brazil) BRA | Naldo | 32 | 0 | 28+2 | 0 | 2 | 0 |
| 6 | MF | (Croatia) CRO | Sammir | 27 | 1 | 16+7 | 1 | 2+2 | 0 |
| 7 | MF | (Spain) ESP | Ángel Lafita | 16 | 2 | 12+3 | 2 | 1 | 0 |
| 8 | MF | (Algeria) ALG | Mehdi Lacen | 31 | 2 | 29+1 | 2 | 1 | 0 |
| 9 | FW | (Spain) ESP | Álvaro Vázquez | 26 | 9 | 19+2 | 7 | 2+3 | 2 |
| 10 | MF | (Spain) ESP | Pablo Sarabia | 40 | 4 | 31+4 | 2 | 2+3 | 2 |
| 11 | MF | (France) FRA | Karim Yoda | 20 | 4 | 12+6 | 4 | 2 | 0 |
| 12 | DF | (Spain) ESP | Álvaro Arroyo | 17 | 0 | 10+2 | 0 | 5 | 0 |
| 13 | GK | (Spain) ESP | Jordi Codina | 8 | 0 | 5 | 0 | 3 | 0 |
| 14 | MF | (Spain) ESP | Pedro León | 29 | 2 | 16+9 | 2 | 3+1 | 0 |
| 15 | FW | (Senegal) SEN | Baba Diawara | 23 | 1 | 5+16 | 1 | 1+1 | 0 |
| 17 | MF | (Spain) ESP | Diego Castro | 36 | 4 | 25+7 | 3 | 3+1 | 1 |
| 18 | DF | (Spain) ESP | Sergio Escudero | 34 | 2 | 26+4 | 2 | 4 | 0 |
| 20 | DF | (Spain) ESP | Juan Valera | 13 | 0 | 12 | 0 | 1 | 0 |
| 22 | MF | (Spain) ESP | Juan Rodríguez | 38 | 1 | 32+2 | 1 | 4 | 0 |
| 23 | MF | (Colombia) COL | Fredy Hinestroza | 39 | 2 | 21+12 | 2 | 5+1 | 0 |
| 25 | GK | (Spain) ESP | Vicente Guaita | 29 | 0 | 29 | 0 | 0 | 0 |
| 26 | FW | (Spain) ESP | Ivi | 9 | 0 | 0+8 | 0 | 1 | 0 |
| 27 | DF | (Spain) ESP | Carlos Vigaray | 17 | 1 | 10+3 | 0 | 4 | 1 |
| 28 | MF | (Spain) ESP | Pedro Astray | 2 | 0 | 0 | 0 | 1+1 | 0 |
| 31 | FW | (Spain) ESP | Pere Milla | 1 | 0 | 0 | 0 | 1 | 0 |
| 32 | MF | (Argentina) ARG | Emiliano Buendía | 11 | 0 | 1+5 | 0 | 3+2 | 0 |
| 36 | MF | (Spain) ESP | Álex Felip | 13 | 0 | 0+10 | 0 | 3 | 0 |
Players who have made an appearance or had a squad number this season but have been loaned out or transferred
| 15 | DF | (Spain) ESP | Rafa | 1 | 0 | 1 | 0 | 0 | 0 |
| 21 | MF | (Spain) ESP | Míchel | 13 | 1 | 8+4 | 1 | 1 | 0 |

== Competitions ==
=== Overall ===
| Competition | Started round | Final position / round | First match | Last match |
|---|---|---|---|---|
| La Liga | — | | August 2014 | May 2015 |
| Copa del Rey | Round of 32 | | December 2014 | |

Updated to match played June 2014
Source: Competitions

=== La Liga ===
==== League table ====
| Pos | Team | Pld | W | D | L | GF | GA | GD | Pts | Qualification or relegation |
|---|---|---|---|---|---|---|---|---|---|---|
| 13 | Elche (Note: Elche administratively relegated by the LFP.) (R) | 38 | 11 | 8 | 19 | 35 | 62 | −27 | 41 | Relegation to Segunda División |
| 14 | Levante | 38 | 9 | 10 | 19 | 34 | 67 | −33 | 37 (Note: Levante ahead on head-to-head record; Levante–Getafe 1–1, Getafe–Levante 0–1.) | |
| 15 | Getafe | 38 | 10 | 7 | 21 | 33 | 64 | −31 | 37 | |
| 16 | Deportivo La Coruña | 38 | 7 | 14 | 17 | 35 | 60 | −25 | 35 (Note: Head-to-head record: Deportivo 7 pts, Granada 6 pts, Eibar 2 pts) | |
| 17 | Granada | 38 | 7 | 14 | 17 | 29 | 64 | −35 | 35 | |

Source: La Liga
Rules for classification: 1) points; 2) head-to-head points; 3) head-to-head goal difference; 4) goal difference; 5) number of goals scored; 6) fair-play points; 7) playoff match
(R) Relegated

==== Matches ====
Kickoff times are in CET. Win Draw Loss

| 24 August 2014 1 | Celta Vigo | 3–1 | Getafe | Vigo |
| 21:00 CEST | Nolito 20', (yellow card) 34'; Jonny (yellow card) 31'; Planas (yellow card) 43'; Orellana 56', (yellow card) 68'; Larrivey 70' | Report | Alexis (yellow card) 45'; Sammir 62' | Stadium: Balaídos; Attendance: 20,416; Referee: Mario Melero López |

| 29 August 2014 2 | Getafe | 1–0 | Almería | Getafe |
| 20:00 CEST | Vázquez 29'; Hinestroza (yellow card) 53'; Castro (yellow card) 81'; Sarabia (yellow card) 81' | Report | Édgar (yellow card) 59'; Dos Santos (yellow card) 71' | Stadium: Coliseum Alfonso Perez; Attendance: 6,000; Referee: Santiago Jaime Latre |

| 14 September 2014 3 | Sevilla | 2–0 | Getafe | Seville |
| 19:00 CEST | Krychowiak (yellow card) 35'; Carriço (yellow card) 43'; Bacca 44' (pen.); Vidal 87' | Report | Arroyo (yellow card) 18'; Alexis (yellow card) 43'; Guaita (yellow card) 43'; Castro (yellow card) 65'; Míchel (yellow card) 65'; Hinestroza (yellow card) 76' | Stadium: Ramón Sánchez Pizjuán; Attendance: 34,600; Referee: Alfonso Álvarez Izquierdo |

| 22 September 2014 4 | Getafe | 0–3 | Valencia | Getafe |
| 20:45 CEST | Naldo (yellow card) 18'; Rodríguez (yellow card) 43'; Hinestroza (yellow card) 45'; Valera (yellow card) 58'; Lafita (yellow card) 79'; Diawara (yellow card) 81' | Report | Alcácer 7'; Gomes 20'; Rodrigo (yellow card) 38' (yellow-red card) 73', (goal) 72' (pen.); Parejo (yellow card) 65' | Stadium: Coliseum Alfonso Pérez; Attendance: 6,000; Referee: Alberto Undiano Mallenco |

| 25 September 2014 5 | Espanyol | 2–0 | Getafe | Cornellà de Llobregat |
| 20:00 CEST | Álvarez (yellow card) 62'; García 65'; Stuani 82' | Report | Arroyo (yellow card) 74'; Míchel (yellow card) 82' | Stadium: Cornellà-El Prat; Attendance: 14,285; Referee: David Fernández Borbalán |

| 28 September 2014 6 | Getafe | 1–0 | Málaga | Getafe |
| 18:00 CEST | Míchel 25' | Report | Camacho (yellow card) 29'; Darder (yellow card) 64'; Weligton (yellow card) 87' (yellow-red card) 90+2'; Rosales (yellow card) 90' | Stadium: Coliseum Alfonso Pérez; Attendance: 5,500; Referee: Eduardo Prieto Iglesias |

| 3 October 2014 7 | Getafe | 1–1 | Córdoba | Getafe |
| 15:00 CEST | Sarabia (yellow card) 87'; Diawara 88' | Report | Ekeng (yellow card) 30', (goal) 78'; Vico (yellow card) 56' | Stadium: Coliseum Alfonso Pérez; Attendance: 9,000; Referee: Juan Martínez Munuera |

| 20 October 2014 8 | Real Sociedad | 1–2 | Getafe | San Sebastián |
| 14:45 CEST | Zaldúa (yellow card) 13'; Hervías 82' | Report | Hinestroza (yellow card) 42'; Lacen (yellow card) 45+1'; Valera (yellow card) 77'; Yoda 90', 90+4'; Míchel (yellow card) 90+1' | Stadium: Anoeta; Attendance: 19,098; Referee: Pedro Pérez Montero |

| 26 October 2014 9 | Getafe | 0–1 | Atlético Madrid | Getafe |
| 16:00 CET | Alexis (red card) 56'; Lafita (yellow card) 68'; Velázquez (yellow card) 71'; Sarabia (yellow card) 90' | Report | Mandžukić 40', (yellow card) 52'; Miranda (yellow card) 57'; Siqueira (yellow card) 83' | Stadium: Coliseum Alfonso Pérez; Attendance: 9,300; Referee: Mario Melero López |

| 31 October 2014 10 | Deportivo | 1–2 | Getafe | A Coruña |
| 15:45 CET | Wilk (yellow card) 31'; Cavaleiro (yellow card) 60'; Postiga 80' | Report | Yoda 35'; Lafita 46', (yellow card) 62' | Stadium: Riazor; Attendance: 20,150; Referee: Alejandro Hernández Hernández |

| 8 November 2014 11 | Getafe | 0–0 | Elche | Getafe |
| 12:00 CET | Escudero (yellow card) 41' | Report | Albácar (yellow card) 74'; Tytoń (yellow card) 78' | Stadium: Coliseum Alfonso Pérez; Attendance: 6,000; Referee: David Fernández Borbalán |

| 23 November 2014 12 | Villarreal | 2–1 | Getafe | Villarreal |
| 15:00 CET | Ruiz (yellow card) 17'; Mario 38'; Gerard 43', (yellow card) 59'; J. Dos Santos (yellow card) 89' | Report | Sarabia (yellow card) 56'; Lacen 61'; Velázquez (yellow card) 81' | Stadium: El Madrigal; Attendance: 19,500; Referee: Santiago Jaime Latre |

| 29 November 2014 13 | Getafe | 1–2 | Athletic Bilbao | Getafe |
| 10:00 CET | Míchel (yellow card) 11'; Diawara (yellow card) 15'; Sarabia (yellow card) 20'; Naldo (yellow card) 57'; Velázquez (yellow card) 82'; Escudero (yellow card) 88'; Arroyo (yellow card) 89'; Lafita 90+1' | Report | Muniain (yellow card) 18'; San José 36', (yellow card) 80'; Rico (yellow card) 40'; Balenziaga (yellow card) 51'; Laporte (yellow card) 70'; Beñat 90' | Stadium: Coliseum Alfonso Pérez; Attendance: 8,100; Referee: Alfonso Álvarez Izquierdo |

| 8 December 2014 14 | Levante | 1–1 | Getafe | Valencia |
| 13:00 CET | Víctor (yellow card) 41'; Karabelas (yellow card) 63'; Martins 71'; Ivanschitz (yellow card) 73' | Report | Hinestroza (yellow card) 31'; Yoda 56'; Lacen (yellow card) 62'; Valera (yellow card) 74'; Alexis (yellow card) 83' | Stadium: Ciutat de València; Attendance: 13,582; Referee: Mario Melero López |

| 13 December 2014 15 | Getafe | 0–0 | Barcelona | Getafe |
| 16:00 CET | Sarabia (yellow card) 65'; Castro (yellow card) 90+5' | Report | | Stadium: Coliseum Alfonso Pérez; Attendance: 9,500; Referee: Iñaki Vicandi Garrido |

| 21 December 2014 16 | Granada | 1–1 | Getafe | Granada |
| 17:00 CET | Rico (yellow card) 20'; Córdoba (yellow card) 40'; Iturra (yellow card) 61'; Riki (yellow card) 77'; Márquez (yellow card) 90+2' | Report | Alexis (yellow card) 37'; Velázquez (yellow card) 46', (goal) 78'; Lacen (yellow card) 51' | Stadium: Los Cármenes; Attendance: 19,600; Referee: Fernando Teixeira Vitienes |

| 4 January 2015 17 | Getafe | 1–2 | Rayo Vallecano | Getafe |
| 18:00 CET | Vázquez 3'; Valera (yellow card) 27'; Sarabia (yellow card) 35'; Lacen (yellow card) 66' | Report | Jozabed 39'; Baena 64'; Insúa (yellow card) 84'; Trashorras (yellow card) 87' | Stadium: Coliseum Alfonso Pérez; Attendance: 6,500; Referee: Alejandro Hernández Hernández |

| 10 January 2015 18 | Eibar | 2–1 | Getafe | Eibar |
| 16:00 CET | Manu 33'; Bóveda (yellow card) 47'; Capa 51', (yellow card) 85' | Report | Rodríguez (yellow card) 53'; Castro 80' | Stadium: Ipurua; Attendance: 4,115; Referee: Carlos Clos Gómez |

| 18 January 2015 19 | Getafe | 0–3 | Real Madrid | Getafe |
| 12:00 CET | Velázquez (yellow card) 31'; Lago (yellow card) 64' | Report | Kroos (yellow card) 34'; Rodríguez (yellow card) 61'; Ronaldo 63', 79'; Bale 67' | Stadium: Coliseum Alfonso Pérez; Attendance: 11,500; Referee: Pedro Pérez Montero |

| 26 January 2015 20 | Getafe | 2–1 | Celta Vigo | Getafe |
| 14:45 CET | Vázquez 19'; Alexis (yellow card) 23'; Escudero (yellow card) 81'; Sarabia 85' | Report | Charles 15'; Planas (yellow card) 49'; Radoja (yellow card) 77'; Jonny (yellow card) 84'; Gómez (yellow card) 89' | Stadium: Coliseum Alfonso Pérez; Attendance: 3,500; Referee: Antonio Mateu Lahoz |

| 1 February 2015 21 | Almería | 1–0 | Getafe | Almería |
| 17:00 CET | Verza (yellow card) 40'; Édgar 44'; Hemed (yellow card) 56' (yellow-red card) 82'; Soriano (yellow card) 77'; Espinosa (yellow card) 90+3' | Report | Hinestroza (yellow card) 26'; Castro (yellow card) 34'; Escudero (yellow card) 55' (yellow-red card) 63'; Lago (yellow card) 90' | Stadium: Mediterráneo; Attendance: 13,000; Referee: Ignacio Iglesias Villanueva |

| 8 February 2015 22 | Getafe | 2–1 | Sevilla | Getafe |
| 17:00 CET | Vázquez 29' (pen.); J. López (yellow card) 58'; Pedro León 85' | Report | Banega (yellow card) 56'; Krychowiak 66'; Figueiras (yellow card) 87' | Stadium: Coliseum Alfonso Pérez; Attendance: 5,000; Referee: Xavier Estrada Fernández |

| 15 February 2015 23 | Valencia | 1–0 | Getafe | Valencia |
| 12:00 CET | De Paul (yellow card) 25'; Barragán (yellow card) 27'; Pérez (yellow card) 34'; Negredo 71' (pen.) | Report | Vázquez (yellow card) 27'; Castro (yellow card) 39'; Rodríguez (yellow card) 62'; Escudero (yellow card) 82' | Stadium: Mestalla; Attendance: 48,245; Referee: José González González |

| 20 February 2015 24 | Getafe | 2–1 | Espanyol | Getafe |
| 14:45 CET | Rodríguez (yellow card) 29'; Sarabia 33'; Lacen (yellow card) 47'; Vázquez 57'; Alexis (yellow card) 71' | Report | J. López (yellow card) 30'; Duarte (yellow card) 60'; Cañas (yellow card) 62'; Arbilla 89' | Stadium: Coliseum Alfonso Pérez; Attendance: 10,000; Referee: Santiago Jaime Latre |

| 28 February 2015 25 | Málaga | 3–2 | Getafe | Málaga |
| 16:00 CET | Juanmi 10'; Darder (yellow card) 16', (goal) 57'; Horta 68'; Rosales (yellow card) 86'; Castillejo (yellow card) 90+1' | Report | Alexis (yellow card) 25'; Vázquez 55', 76' | Stadium: La Rosaleda; Attendance: 21,600; Referee: Eduardo Prieto Iglesias |

| 9 March 2015 26 | Córdoba | 1–2 | Getafe | Córdoba |
| 15:45 CET | Cartabia (yellow card) 20'; Andone (yellow card) 74', (goal) 77'; López (yellow card) 85' | Report | Alexis (yellow card) 62'; Naldo (yellow card) 85'; Vico 87' (o.g.); Rodríguez 90+2' | Stadium: Nuevo Arcángel; Attendance: 15,181; Referee: Alfonso Álvarez Izquierdo |

| 16 March 2015 27 | Getafe | 0–1 | Real Sociedad | Getafe |
| 15:45 CET | Rodríguez (yellow card) 68'; J. López (yellow card) 69'; Alexis (yellow card) 87'; Sarabia (yellow card) 90+3' | Report | I. Martínez 66'; Canales (yellow card) 82' | Stadium: Coliseum Alfonso Pérez; Attendance: 5,500; Referee: Mario Melero López |

| 21 March 2015 28 | Atlético Madrid | 2–0 | Getafe | Madrid |
| 16:00 CET | Torres 3'; Tiago 44', (yellow card) 62'; Gabi (yellow card) 74' | Report | Naldo (yellow card) 36'; Vigaray (yellow card) 56' | Stadium: Vicente Calderón; Attendance: 38,673; Referee: Juan Martínez Munuera |

| 5 April 2015 29 | Getafe | 2–1 | Deportivo | Getafe |
| 13:00 CEST | Alexis 17'; Escudero 34'; Castro (yellow card) 76' | Report | Cavaleiro (yellow card) 61'; Toché 79'; Sidnei (yellow card) 81'; Lucas (yellow card) 90' | Stadium: Coliseum Alfonso Pérez; Attendance: 6,200; Referee: Carlos Clos Gómez |

| 9 April 2015 30 | Elche | 0–1 | Getafe | Elche |
| 16:00 CEST | Jonathas (yellow card) 42'; Adrián (yellow card) 55' | Report | Vigaray (yellow card) 37'; Escudero (yellow card) 65'; Hinestroza 84'; Vázquez (yellow card) 84' | Stadium: Manuel Martínez Valero; Attendance: 15,000; Referee: José González González |

| 12 April 2015 31 | Getafe | 1–1 | Villarreal | Getafe |
| 12:00 CEST | Rodríguez (yellow card) 61'; Castro 64'; Naldo (yellow card) 82' | Report | Trigueros (yellow card) 26'; Bailly (yellow card) 39'; Uche 52' (pen.); Rukavina (yellow card) 56'; Musacchio (yellow card) 65'; G. Dos Santos (yellow card) 70'; Costa (yellow card) 78' | Stadium: Coliseum Alfonso Pérez; Attendance: 6,000; Referee: José Teixeira Vitienes |

| 18 April 2015 32 | Athletic Bilbao | 4–0 | Getafe | Bilbao |
| 16:00 CEST | Etxeita (yellow card) 27'; Aduriz 45' (pen.), 46'; Beñat (yellow card) 52'; Ibai 79'; Susaeta 87' | Report | Castro (yellow card) 22'; Alexis (yellow card) 32'; Velázquez (red card) 44'; Pedro León (yellow card) 88'; Lago (yellow card) 90+2' | Stadium: San Mamés; Attendance: 40,000; Referee: Antonio Mateu Lahoz |

| 25 April 2015 33 | Getafe | 0–1 | Levante | Getafe |
| 14:00 CEST | Sarabia (yellow card) 56'; Vigaray (yellow card) 72'; Escudero (yellow card) 83'; Buendía (yellow card) 90+2' | Report | Víctor 35'; Simão Mate (yellow card) 60'; Toño (yellow card) 65'; Morales (yellow card) 66' | Stadium: Coliseum Alfonso Pérez; Attendance: 7,000; Referee: Alfonso Álvarez Izquierdo |

| 28 April 2015 34 | Barcelona | 6–0 | Getafe | Barcelona |
| 20:00 CEST | Messi 9' (pen.), 47'; Suárez 25', 40'; Neymar 28'; Xavi 30' | Report | | Stadium: Camp Nou; Attendance: 65,356; Referee: David Fernández Borbalán |

| 3 May 2015 35 | Getafe | 1–2 | Granada | Getafe |
| 17:00 CEST | Pedro León 45'; Lacen (yellow card) 71'; Alexis (yellow card) 90'; Escudero (yellow card) 90+4' | Report | El-Arabi 14' (pen.), 59'; Cala (yellow card) 53'; Piti (yellow card) 69'; Mainz (yellow card) 85'; Pérez (yellow card) 90' | Stadium: Coliseum Alfonso Pérez; Attendance: 7,000; Referee: Eduardo Prieto Iglesias |

| 11 May 2015 36 | Rayo Vallecano | 2–0 | Getafe | Madrid |
| 14:45 CEST | Manucho 28', (yellow card) 48'; Insúa (yellow card) 62'; Miku 73'; Aquino (red card) 87' | Report | Sarabia (yellow card) 75'; Alexis (yellow card) 82'; Lago (red card) 87' | Stadium: Campo de Vallecas; Attendance: 9,475; Referee: Pedro Pérez Montero |

| 17 May 2015 37 | Getafe | 1–1 | Eibar | Getafe |
| 13:00 CEST | Hinestroza 33' | Report | Borja (yellow card) 24', (goal) 36'; Vilà (yellow card) 48' | Stadium: Coliseum Alfonso Pérez; Attendance: 8,808; Referee: Carlos Clos Gómez |

| 23 May 2015 38 | Real Madrid | 7–3 | Getafe | Madrid |
| 20:30 CEST | Ronaldo 13', 32', 34' (pen.); Jesé (yellow card) 45', (goal) 71'; Hernández 47'; Rodríguez 51'; Marcelo (yellow card) 82', (goal) 90' | Report | Escudero 22'; Castro 26'; Lacen 42', (yellow card) 80'; Alexis (yellow card) 80' | Stadium: Estadio Santiago Bernabéu; Attendance: 63,769; Referee: José Teixeira Vitienes |

=== Copa del Rey ===
==== Round of 32 ====
| 5 December 2014 First leg | Getafe | 3–0 | Eibar | Getafe |
| 20:00 CET | Sarabia 63', 74'; Vázquez 70' | Report | | Stadium: Coliseum Alfonso Pérez; Attendance: 1,700; Referee: Alejandro Hernández Hernández |

| 17 December 2014 Second leg | Eibar | 1–2 (1–5 agg.) | Getafe | Eibar |
| 20:00 CET | Piovaccari 55' | Report | Vigaray 19'; Castro 33' | Stadium: Ipurua; Attendance: 2,599; Referee: Fernando Teixeira Vitienes |

==== Round of 16 ====
| 7 January 2015 First leg | Almería | 1–1 | Getafe | Almería |
| 22:00 CET | Marín (yellow card) 54'; Verza 59' (pen.); Silva (yellow card) 74' | Report | Verza 21' (o.g.); Velázquez (yellow card) 31'; Lago (yellow card) 35'; Castro (yellow card) 45'; Rodríguez (yellow card) 90+4' | Stadium: Mediterráneo; Attendance: 3,196; Referee: José González González |

| 14 January 2015 Second leg | Getafe | 1–0 (2–1 agg.) | Almería | Getafe |
| 20:00 CET | Escudero (yellow card) 55'; Vázquez 76' | Report | Azeez (yellow card) 23'; Thomas (yellow card) 77'; Michel (yellow card) 85' | Stadium: Coliseum Alfonso Pérez; Attendance: 3,000; Referee: Alfonso Álvarez Izquierdo |

==== Quarter-finals ====
| 21 January 2015 First leg | Villarreal | 1–0 | Getafe | Villarreal |
| 20:00 CET | Bruno 85' | Report | Felip (yellow card) 42'; Rodríguez (yellow card) 43' | Stadium: El Madrigal; Attendance: 14,000; Referee: Alejandro Hernández Hernández |

| 29 January 2015 Second leg | Getafe | 0–1 (0–2 agg.) | Villarreal | Getafe |
| 20:00 CET | Pedro León (yellow card) 67' | Report | Rukavina (yellow card) 33'; Asenjo (yellow card) 61'; Gerard 78'; Cheryshev (yellow card) 89' | Stadium: Coliseum Alfonso Pérez; Attendance: 9,000; Referee: Fernando Teixeira Vitienes |
