= Diego Ferreira =

Diego Ferreira may refer to:

- Diego Ferreira (sprinter) (born 1975), Paraguayan sprinter
- Carlos Diego Ferreira (born 1985), Brazilian mixed martial artist
- Diego Ferreira (footballer, born 1985), Uruguayan football midfielder
- Diego Ferreira (footballer, born 1996), Brazilian football right-back

== See also ==
- Diogo Ferreira (disambiguation)
