= Diogo Ferreira =

Diogo Ferreira may refer to:

- Diogo Ferreira (soccer, born 1989), Australian soccer player and manager
- Diogo Ferreira (pole vaulter) (born 1990), Portuguese pole vaulter
- Diogo Ferreira (footballer, born 2007), Portuguese footballer

== See also ==
- Diego Ferreira (disambiguation)
