= Alex Silva (footballer, born 1993) =

Uruguayan footballer

Personal information
- Full name: Alex Silva Quiroga
- Date of birth: 15 June 1993 (age 33)
- Place of birth: Montevideo, Uruguay
- Height: 1.78 m (5 ft 10 in)
- Position: Right back

Team information
- Current team: Boston River
- Number: 16

Youth career
- CA Basañez
- –2010: Progreso

Senior career*
Years	Team	Apps	(Gls)
2012–2014	Progreso	44	(1)
2014–2016	Montevideo Wanderers	54	(2)
2016–2018	Peñarol	19	(0)
2018	→ Progreso (loan)	14	(0)
2018–2019	San Martín SJ	5	(0)
2019	Racing Montevideo	12	(0)
2020–2021	Progreso	29	(1)
2022	Deportivo Maldonado	25	(1)
2023–2024	Progreso	31	(9)
2024	Vila Nova	5	(0)
2025–	Boston River	4	(0)
- * Club domestic league appearances and goals as of 14 September 2024

Alex Silva Quiroga (born 15 June 1993) is a Uruguayan professional footballer who plays as a right back and right winger for Boston River.
