= Emiliano Velázquez =

Uruguayan footballer (born 1994)

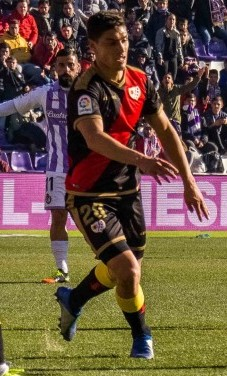
- Velázquez with Rayo Vallecano in 2019

Personal information
- Full name: Emiliano Daniel Velázquez Maldonado
- Date of birth: 30 April 1994 (age 32)
- Place of birth: Montevideo, Uruguay
- Height: 1.84 m (6 ft 0 in)
- Position: Centre back

Team information
- Current team: Danubio
- Number: 2

Youth career
- Danubio

Senior career*
Years	Team	Apps	(Gls)
2012–2014	Danubio	58	(2)
2014–2018	Atlético Madrid	0	(0)
2014–2016	→ Getafe (loan)	38	(4)
2016–2017	→ Braga (loan)	6	(0)
2017–2018	→ Rayo Vallecano (loan)	25	(2)
2018–2021	Rayo Vallecano	42	(0)
2021–2022	Santos	23	(0)
2022–2023	Juárez	9	(0)
2023–2024	Nacional	14	(0)
2025–	Danubio	23	(1)

International career
2008–2009	Uruguay U15	20	(1)
2010–2011	Uruguay U17	39	(3)
2012–2013	Uruguay U20	24	(1)
2014	Uruguay	1	(0)
Medal record
Representing Uruguay
Men's Football
FIFA U-20 World Cup
Runner-up	2013 Turkey
South American U-20 Championship
Third place	2013 Argentina
FIFA U-17 World Cup
Runner-up	2011 Mexico
South American U-17 Championship
Runner-up	2011 Ecuador
- * Club domestic league appearances and goals as of 1 October 2025

Emiliano Daniel Velázquez Maldonado (born 30 April 1994) is an Uruguayan professional footballer who plays as a central defender for Danubio.

== Club career ==
=== Danubio ===
Born in Montevideo, Velázquez graduated from local Danubio F.C.'s youth system, and made his first-team debut on 3 June 2012, starting and being sent off in a 2–1 away loss against C.A. Bella Vista. It was his maiden appearance of the campaign.

Velázquez appeared regularly in the 2012–13 season, appearing in 24 matches (all starts, 2106 minutes of action), as his side finished dead last in Apertura but was fifth in Clausura. On 31 August 2013, he scored his first professional goal, netting the last of a 2–1 away win against Liverpool F.C. Montevideo; he was an ever-present figure during the club's winning campaign.

=== Atlético Madrid ===
On 27 August 2014, Velázquez signed a five-year deal with Atlético Madrid, and the following day he was loaned to Getafe CF for the 2014–15 season. He made his La Liga debut on 28 September, starting in a 1–0 home win against Málaga CF.

Velázquez scored his first goal in the main category of Spanish football on 21 December, netting the last in a 1–1 draw at Granada CF. After contributing with 27 appearances and avoiding relegation, his loan was extended for another year on 2 July 2015.

After an unassuming loan spell at Primeira Liga side S.C. Braga, Velázquez returned to Getafe on 26 July 2017, also in a one-year loan deal. On 24 August, however, he joined Segunda División club Rayo Vallecano on a season-long loan from the latter.

=== Rayo Vallecano ===
After contributing with two goals in 25 appearances as Rayo achieved promotion to the top tier as champions, Velázquez signed a three-year contract with the club on 23 July 2018. He would be mainly used as a backup to Jordi Amat and Abdoulaye Ba during the 2018–19 season, as the Franjirrojos were immediately relegated back.

In July 2019, Velázquez suffered a serious knee injury which sidelined him for most of the campaign. He returned to action nearly a year later, and subsequently became a regular starter under Andoni Iraola as the club achieved another promotion in 2021.

=== Santos ===
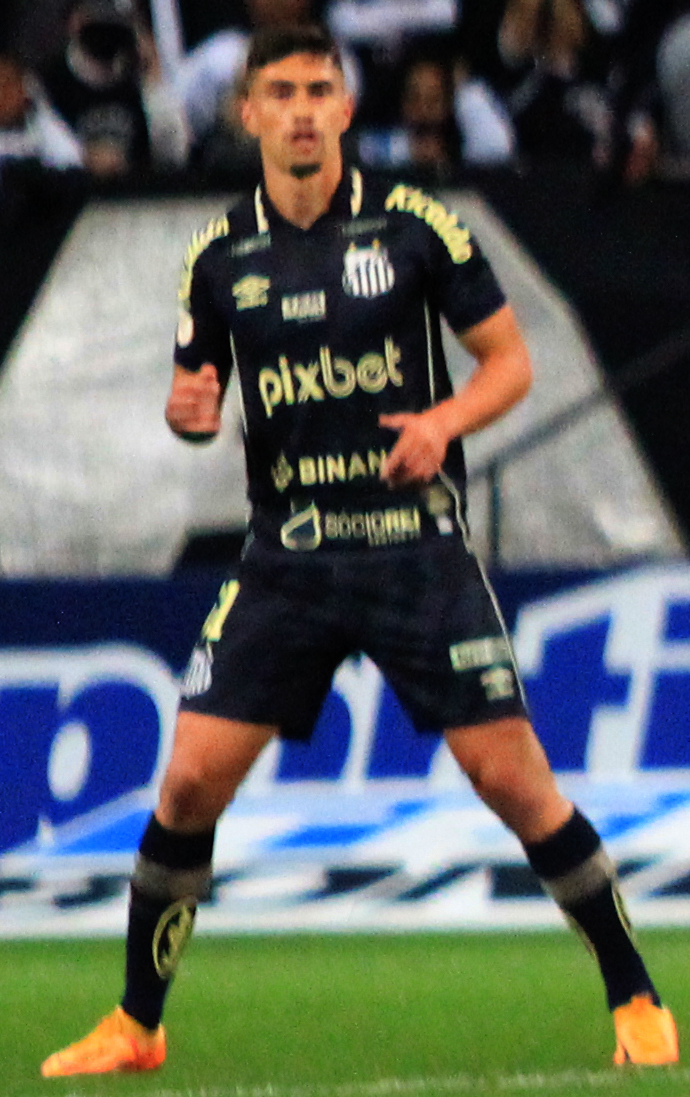
Velázquez playing for Santos in 2022

On 30 August 2021, Velázquez signed a contract with Brazilian club Santos until the end of 2022. He made his club debut on 18 September, starting in a 0–0 away draw against Ceará.

On 5 July 2022, Velázquez terminated his contract with Santos.

=== Juárez ===
On 12 July 2022, Velázquez switched teams and countries again, after signing for Liga MX side Juárez.

=== Nacional ===
On 8 September 2023, Velázquez moved to his home country after 9 years to play for Nacional.

== International career ==
Velázquez appeared with Uruguay under-17's in the 2011 FIFA U-17 World Cup, being also his side's captain. He also played for the under-20's in 2013 FIFA U-20 World Cup hosted in Turkey.

On 8 September 2013, Velázquez was called up to the main squad by manager Óscar Tabárez for a friendly against Colombia. He only made his full international debut on 10 October of the following year, starting in a 1–1 draw against Saudi Arabia at the Prince Abdullah Al Faisal Stadium in Jeddah.

== Personal life ==
Velázquez's older brother Matías is also a footballer. A right back, he also represented Danubio.

In September 2020, Velázquez acquired the Spanish nationality after six years living in the country.

== Career statistics ==
=== Club ===
As of 16 October 2023

Club	Season	League			Cup		Continental		State League		Other		Total	
Club	Season	Division	Apps	Goals	Apps	Goals	Apps	Goals	Apps	Goals	Apps	Goals	Apps	Goals
Danubio	2011–12	Primera División	1	0	—		—		—		—		1	0
Danubio	2012–13	Primera División	24	0	—		0	0	—		—		24	0
Danubio	2013–14	Primera División	32	2	—		—		—		—		32	2
Danubio	2014–15	Primera División	1	0	—		1 (Note: Appearance(s) in Copa Sudamericana)	0	—		—		2	0
Danubio	Total		58	2	—		1	0	—		—		59	2
Atlético Madrid	2014–15	La Liga	0	0	0	0	—		—		—		0	0
Getafe (loan)	2014–15	La Liga	27	1	5	0	—		—		—		32	1
Getafe (loan)	2015–16	La Liga	11	3	0	0	—		—		—		11	3
Getafe (loan)	Total		38	4	5	0	—		—		—		43	4
Braga (loan)	2016–17	Primeira Liga	6	0	1	0	2 (Note: Appearance(s) in UEFA Europa League)	1	—		2 (Note: Appearance(s) in Taça da Liga)	1	11	2
Rayo Vallecano	2017–18	Segunda División	25	2	1	0	—		—		—		26	2
Rayo Vallecano	2018–19	La Liga	18	0	2	0	—		—		—		20	0
Rayo Vallecano	2019–20	Segunda División	2	0	0	0	—		—		—		2	0
Rayo Vallecano	2020–21	Segunda División	22	0	3	0	—		—		3 (Note: Appearance(s) in Segunda División play-offs)	0	28	0
Rayo Vallecano	Total		67	2	6	0	—		—		3	0	76	2
Santos	2021	Série A	10	0	—		—		—		—		10	0
Santos	2022	Série A	9	0	1	0	3	0	4 (Note: Appearance(s) in Campeonato Paulista)	0	—		17	0
Santos	Total		19	0	1	0	3	0	4	0	—		27	0
Juárez	2022–23	Liga MX	9	0	—		—		—		—		9	0
Nacional	2023	Primera División	0	0	—		—		—		—		0	0
Career total			197	8	13	0	6	1	4	0	5	1	225	10

=== International ===
As of 22 August 2021

Appearances and goals by national team and year
National team	Year	Apps	Goals
Uruguay	2014	1	0
Total		1	0

== Honours ==
Rayo Vallecano

- Segunda División: 2017–18
