= Miguel Ángel (footballer, born 1996) =

Spanish footballer

Personal information
- Full name: Miguel Ángel Muñoz Alonso
- Date of birth: 26 January 1995 (age 31)
- Place of birth: Madrid, Spain
- Height: 1.78 m (5 ft 10 in)
- Position: Left back

Youth career
- Getafe

Senior career*
| Years | Team | Apps | (Gls) |
| 2014–2017 | Getafe B | 49 | (3) |
| 2016 | Getafe | 4 | (0) |
| 2017–2018 | Pontevedra | 12 | (0) |

Managerial career
- 2023: Sheffield Wednesday (assistant)
- * Club domestic league appearances and goals

Miguel Ángel Muñoz Alonso (born 26 January 1996), known as Miguel Ángel, is a Spanish football coach and a former right back.

== Playing career ==
Born in Madrid, Miguel Ángel was a Getafe CF youth graduate. On 2 March 2014, while still a junior, he made his senior debut with the reserves by starting in a 1–2 Segunda División B away loss against Bilbao Athletic; it was his maiden appearance of the campaign.

Miguel Ángel was definitely promoted to the B-team in June 2015, becoming a regular starter afterwards. On 21 April 2016 he made his first team – and La Liga – debut, coming on as a first-half substitute for injured Roberto Lago in a 2–1 away win against Real Sociedad.

On 29 June 2017, Miguel Ángel moved to Pontevedra CF in the third division.

== Coaching career ==
In July 2023, he joined Sheffield Wednesday manager Xisco Muñoz as part of the back room coaching staff.
