= Gonzalo Latorre =

Uruguayan footballer (born 1996)

Personal information
- Full name: Gonzalo José Latorre Bovio
- Date of birth: 26 April 1996 (age 30)
- Place of birth: Montevideo, Uruguay
- Height: 1.71 m (5 ft 7 in)
- Position: Forward

Team information
- Current team: Bisceglie

Youth career
- –2014: Peñarol

Senior career*
Years	Team	Apps	(Gls)
2015	Atenas	8	(0)
2015–2019	Cruzeiro	0	(0)
2017	→ Sambenedettese (loan)	6	(0)
2020–2021	Cerro Largo	5	(0)
2022	Desportiva-ES		
2022–2023	Devolli		
2023–2024	Atletico Racale		
2024–	Bisceglie		

International career
2011	Uruguay U15	7	(1)
2013	Uruguay U17	12	(2)
2014	Uruguay U20	4	(0)
- * Club domestic league appearances and goals

Gonzalo José Latorre Bovio (born 26 April 1996) is an Uruguayan footballer who plays as a forward for AS Bisceglie 1913.

He spent several years in Brazil's Cruzeiro.

After returning to Uruguay with Cerro Largo, he played in Brazil again for Desportiva-ES before moving to a new European country, Albania, playing for KS Devolli. In 2023–24 he was back in Italy and with 16 goals for Atletico Racale he became the top goalscorer in their group of the Eccellenza Pugliese. He was subsequently picked up by Bisceglie.
