= Álex Felip =

Spanish footballer

Personal information
- Full name: Alejandro Felip Selma
- Date of birth: 3 April 1992 (age 34)
- Place of birth: Castellón, Spain
- Height: 1.80 m (5 ft 11 in)
- Position: Midfielder

Team information
- Current team: Hospitalet
- Number: 22

Youth career
- 2004–2011: Castellón

Senior career*
| Years | Team | Apps | (Gls) |
| 2011–2013 | Castellón | 70 | (1) |
| 2013–2015 | Getafe B | 60 | (1) |
| 2015 | Getafe | 10 | (0) |
| 2016 | Elche | 2 | (0) |
| 2016 | Racing Ferrol | 15 | (0) |
| 2017–2018 | Saguntino | 43 | (4) |
| 2018–2019 | Ontinyent | 25 | (1) |
| 2019–2020 | Lleida Esportiu | 10 | (1) |
| 2020– | Hospitalet | 0 | (0) |
- * Club domestic league appearances and goals as of 8 March 2020

Alejandro 'Álex' Felip Selma (born 3 April 1992) is a Spanish footballer who plays for CE L'Hospitalet as a central midfielder.

== Club career ==
Born in Castellón de la Plana, Valencian Community, Felip joined CD Castellón's youth setup in 2004, aged 12. He made his senior debuts in the 2010–11 season, being relegated from Segunda División B.

On 1 August 2013 Felip moved to Getafe CF, being assigned to the reserves also in the third level. On 14 January 2015 he played his first match with the main squad, starting in a 1–0 home win against UD Almería, for the campaign's Copa del Rey.

Felip made his La Liga debut four days later, coming on as a late substitute for Sammir in a 0–3 home loss against Real Madrid. On 3 July he left the club, after appearing in ten league matches with the main squad.

In August 2015 Felip joined Elche CF on a trial basis. After suffering an injury in the pre-season, he was offered a contract only in October, and officially registered in January 2016 due to the lack of a professional contract in the previous campaign.
