= Jonathan Píriz =

Uruguayan footballer (born 1986)

Personal information
- Full name: Jonathan Alberto Píriz Palacio
- Date of birth: 2 October 1986 (age 40)
- Place of birth: Montevideo, Uruguay
- Height: 1.85 m (6 ft 1 in)
- Position: Centre-back

Youth career
- –2007: Progreso

Senior career*
Years	Team	Apps	(Gls)
2007–2008	Progreso		
2008–2010	Peñarol	0	(0)
2010–2014	Fénix	85	(1)
2013	→ Independiente (loan)	11	(0)
2014	Nacional	1	(0)
2014–2015	Rampla Juniors	5	(0)
2015–2016	Rentistas		
2016	Cerro	0	(0)
2016–2017	Liverpool Montevideo	2	(0)
2017	Sud América	13	(0)
2018–2019	Villa Española	27	(0)
2020	Central Español	19	(0)
2021-2022	La Luz	7	(0)
- * Club domestic league appearances and goals as of 19:49, 24 May 2022 (UTC)

Jonathan Alberto Píriz (born October 2, 1986 in Montevideo, Uruguay) is an Uruguayan footballer who plays as defender. He is currently free agent.
