= Fidel Amado Pérez =

Paraguayan footballer (born 1980)

Personal information
- Full name: Fidel Amado Pérez
- Date of birth: 19 October 1980 (44)
- Place of birth: Ypané, Paraguay
- Position: Defender

Team information
- Current team: Silvio Pettirossi Technician Director

Senior career*
Years	Team	Apps	(Gls)
2002-2004	Club Guaraní		
2004	Club Nacional		
2005-2010	Club Cerro Porteño		
2011	Club Sportivo Luqueño		
2012	Caracas		
2012-2014	Sol de América de Formosa		
- * Club domestic league appearances and goals

Fidel Amado Pérez (Ypané, Central Department, born October 19, 1980) was a Paraguayan football player. He played as a defender and is currently technical director of Silvio Pettirossi, a team that currently plays in the Fourth Division of Paraguay.

== Career ==
He has played in the Paraguayan first division with various clubs, on December 29, 2011 if he transferred to Venezuelan Caracas. On August 29, 2012 he joined Sol de América de Formosa.

== Clubs ==
Club	Country	Years
Guaraní	Paraguay	2002 - 2004
Nacional	Paraguay	2004
Cerro Porteño	Paraguay	2005 - 2010
Sportivo Luqueño	Paraguay	2011
Caracas	Venezuela	2012
Sol de América (Formosa)	Argentina	2012-2014
