= Federico Millacet =

Uruguayan footballer (born 1991)

Personal information
- Full name: Federico Damián Millacet Echevarría
- Date of birth: 21 July 1991 (age 35)
- Place of birth: Montevideo, Uruguay
- Height: 1.75 m (5 ft 9 in)
- Position: Forward

Youth career
- 1995–2011: Progreso

Senior career*
Years	Team	Apps	(Gls)
2011–2014	Progreso	36	(4)
2014–2015	Juventud Las Piedras	16	(1)
2015–2017	Sud América	44	(0)
2017–2019	Progreso	54	(2)
2020–2021	San Marcos	50	(7)
2022	Progreso	12	(3)
2022	Gualaceo	13	(0)
2023	La Luz	12	(0)
2023	Progreso	11	(2)
2024	Cooper	24	(2)
2025	Cerrito	28	(5)
2026–	La Luz	0	(0)
- * Club domestic league appearances and goals as of 2 February 2026

Federico Damián Millacet Echevarría (born 21 July 1991) is a Uruguayan footballer who plays as a forward. He last played for La Luz.
