= Francis D'Albenas =

Uruguayan footballer (born 1996)

Personal information
- Full name: Luis Francis D'Albenas Reyes
- Date of birth: January 11, 1996 (age 30)
- Place of birth: Montevideo, Uruguay
- Height: 1.77 m (5 ft 10 in)
- Position: Centre-forward

Team information
- Current team: Sud América

Youth career
- 2009–2014: River Plate Montevideo

Senior career*
Years	Team	Apps	(Gls)
2014–2018	River Plate Montevideo	1	(0)
2014–2015	→ Rampla Juniors (loan)	13	(1)
2015	→ Patriotas Boyacá (loan)	0	(0)
2018–	→ Sud América (loan)	1	(0)

International career
2011	Uruguay U15	7	(3)
2013	Uruguay U17	11	(3)
- * Club domestic league appearances and goals as of 15 March 2018

Luis Francis D'Albenas Reyes (born January 11, 1996) is a Uruguayan professional footballer who plays as a centre forward for Sud América in the Uruguayan Primera División.

== Club career ==
Vicente started his career playing with River Plate. He made his professional debut during the 2015/16 season.
