= Marcelo Cardozo =

Argentine footballer (born 1987)

Personal information
- Full name: Marcelo Alejandro Cardozo
- Date of birth: 8 December 1987 (age 38)
- Place of birth: Buenos Aires, Argentina
- Height: 1.79 m (5 ft 10 in)
- Position: Left-back

Team information
- Current team: Boca Unidos

Youth career
- Gimnasia LP

Senior career*
Years	Team	Apps	(Gls)
2008–2010	Gimnasia LP	26	(0)
2010–2011	Defensa y Justicia	35	(1)
2011	Gimnasia LP	4	(0)
2012	Godoy Cruz	7	(0)
2012–2013	Defensa y Justicia	29	(0)
2013–2014	Aldosivi	30	(3)
2014–2015	Unión de Santa Fe	20	(0)
2016	Juventud Unida	17	(3)
2016–2017	Nueva Chicago	25	(2)
2017–2018	Tapachula	3	(0)
2018–2019	Quilmes	12	(1)
2020–2021	Los Andes	7	(0)
2021	Güemes	9	(1)
2022–	Boca Unidos	12	(0)
- * Club domestic league appearances and goals as of 16:07, 7 August 2022 (UTC)

Marcelo Alejandro Cardozo (born 8 December 1987) is an Argentine footballer who plays as a left-back for Boca Unidos.
