= Walt Báez =

Uruguayan footballer (born 1978)

Personal information
- Full name: Walter Alejandro Báez Bordón
- Date of birth: 29 November 1978 (age 47)
- Place of birth: Montevideo, Uruguay
- Height: 1.79 m (5 ft 10 in)
- Position: Defender

Team information
- Current team: Club Atlético Villa Teresa

Senior career*
Years	Team	Apps	(Gls)
1997–2004	Danubio F.C.	?	(5)
2005	CSD Municipal	?	(?)
2006–2009	C.A. Bella Vista	103	(5)
2009–2010	C.A. Rentistas	4	(0)
2010–2011	Cerro Largo FC	25	(0)
- * Club domestic league appearances and goals as of January 1, 2008

Walter Alejandro Báez Bordón (born 29 November 1978 in Montevideo) is a Uruguayan footballer who plays as a defender for Club Atlético Villa Teresa.

== Honours ==
Danubio

- Uruguayan Primera División: 2004
