= Diego Ferreira (footballer, born 1985) =

Uruguayan footballer

Personal information
- Full name: Diego Ismael Ferreira Villa
- Date of birth: 4 May 1985 (age 41)
- Place of birth: Montevideo, Uruguay
- Height: 1.82 m (6 ft 0 in)
- Position: Midfielder

Senior career*
Years	Team	Apps	(Gls)
2005–2014	Defensor Sporting	96	(9)
2012–2013	→ Tigre (loan)	20	(0)
2013–2014	→ Atlético Rafaela (loan)	33	(2)
2014–2015	Deportes Antofagasta	26	(2)
2015–2016	Liverpool Montevideo	20	(1)
2016–2017	Fénix	30	(3)
2017–2018	Agropecuario	4	(0)
2018–2019	Racing Montevideo	3	(0)
2019	Villa Española	0	(0)
- * Club domestic league appearances and goals

Diego Ismael Ferreira Villa (born 4 May 1985) is a Uruguayan former footballer who played as a midfielder.

== Teams ==
- (Uruguay) Defensor Sporting 2005–2012
- (Argentina) Tigre 2012–2013
- (Argentina) Atlético Rafaela 2013–2014
- (Chile) Deportes Antofagasta 2014–2015
- (Uruguay) Liverpool 2015–2016
- (Uruguay) Fénix 2016–2017
- (Argentina) Agropecuario 2017–2018
- (Uruguay) Racing Club de Montevideo 2018–2019
- (Uruguay) Villa Española 2019

== Honours ==
=== Player ===
Defensor Sporting

- Uruguayan Primera División (1): 2008
