= 2017–18 Arsenal de Sarandí season =

Arsenal de Sarandí
2017–18 season
- Chairman: Julio Ricardo Grondona
- Manager: Humberto Grondona (until 10 December 2017); Sergio Rondina (from 15 December 2017)
- Stadium: Estadio Julio Humberto Grondona
- Primera División: 28th
- Copa Argentina: Round of 64
- Copa Sudamericana: Second stage
- Top goalscorer: League: Six players (1); All: Rodrigo Contreras (2)

The 2017–18 season is Arsenal de Sarandí's 17th consecutive season in the top-flight of Argentine football. The season covers the period from 1 July 2017 to 30 June 2018.

== Players ==
=== Current squad ===
As of 23 August 2017.

Note: Flags indicate national team as defined under FIFA eligibility rules; some limited exceptions apply. Players may hold more than one non-FIFA nationality.

No.	Pos.	Nation	Player
2	DF	ARG	Marcos Curado
3	DF	ARG	Claudio Corvalán
4	DF	ARG	Sergio Velázquez
7	MF	URU	Maximiliano Calzada
11	FW	ARG	Franco Fragapane
12	GK	ARG	Mauricio Aquino
15	MF	ARG	Gonzalo Giménez
17	DF	ARG	Leonardo Rolón
20	DF	ARG	Salvador Sánchez
22	GK	ARG	Pablo Santillo
23	MF	ARG	Lucas Wilchez
24	MF	ARG	Matías Zaldívar
25	DF	ARG	Federico Milo
31	FW	ARG	Sebastián Lomonaco

No.	Pos.	Nation	Player
32	DF	ARG	Leandro Marín
—	FW	ARG	Bryan Schmidt
—	MF	ARG	David Drocco
—	DF	ARG	Emiliano Papa
—	MF	ARG	Emiliano Purita (on loan from San Lorenzo)
—	DF	ARG	Facundo Cardozo
—	MF	ARG	Facundo Monteseirín (on loan from Lanús)
—	FW	ARG	Gastón del Castillo (on loan from Independiente)
—	MF	ARG	Germán Ferreyra (on loan from Unión La Calera)
—	MF	ARG	Iván Bella
—	MF	ARG	Joaquín Ibáñez
—	DF	ARG	Leandro Godoy
—	GK	ARG	Maximiliano Velazco (on loan from River Plate)
—	FW	ARG	Rodrigo Contreras (on loan from San Lorenzo)

== Transfers ==
=== In ===
Date	Pos.	Name	From	Fee
3 July 2017	DF	(Argentina) Emiliano Papa	(Argentina) Tigre	Undisclosed
4 July 2017	DF	(Argentina) Facundo Cardozo	(Argentina) Vélez Sarsfield	Undisclosed
18 July 2017	MF	(Argentina) Iván Bella	(Argentina) Vélez Sarsfield	Undisclosed
20 July 2017	MF	(Argentina) David Drocco	(Chile) Audax Italiano	Undisclosed
31 July 2017	MF	(Argentina) Joaquín Ibáñez	(Argentina) Lanús	Undisclosed

=== Out ===
Date	Pos.	Name	To	Fee
1 July 2017	MF	(Argentina) Federico Flores	Released	
1 July 2017	MF	(Argentina) Gabriel Sanabria	Released (Note: Following his release, Sanabria signed for Los Andes.)	
1 July 2017	DF	(Argentina) Jonathan Bottinelli	Released (Note: Following his release, Bottinelli signed for Unión Santa Fe.)	
1 July 2017	DF	(Argentina) Luciano Vella	Released	
18 July 2017	DF	(Argentina) Juan Sánchez Sotelo	(Argentina) Temperley	Undisclosed
25 July 2017	MF	(Argentina) Gonzalo Bazán	(Argentina) Sarmiento	Undisclosed
1 August 2017	DF	(Argentina) Germán Niz	(Argentina) San Telmo	Undisclosed
3 August 2017	MF	(Uruguay) Gonzalo Papa	(Argentina) Villa Dálmine	Undisclosed
10 August 2017	DF	(Argentina) Tomás Berra	(Argentina) Santamarina	Undisclosed
22 August 2017	MF	(Argentina) Juan Brunetta	(Argentina) Belgrano	Undisclosed

=== Loan in ===
Date from	Date to	Pos.	Name	From
1 July 2017	30 June 2018	DF	(Argentina) Facundo Monteseirín	(Argentina) Lanús
1 July 2017	30 June 2018	MF	(Argentina) Germán Ferreyra	(Chile) Unión La Calera
1 July 2017	30 June 2018	FW	(Argentina) Rodrigo Contreras	(Argentina) San Lorenzo
19 July 2017	30 June 2018	FW	(Argentina) Gastón del Castillo	(Argentina) Independiente
2 August 2017	30 June 2018	GK	(Argentina) Maximiliano Velazco	(Argentina) River Plate
3 August 2017	30 June 2018	MF	(Argentina) Emiliano Purita	(Argentina) San Lorenzo

== Friendlies ==
=== Pre-season ===
Win Draw Loss

8 August 2017 Friendly	Arsenal de Sarandí (Argentina)	0–1	(Argentina) Atlético Tucumán	Avellaneda, Argentina
		Report	G. Núñez	Stadium: Estadio Julio Humberto Grondona

8 August 2017 Friendly	Arsenal de Sarandí (Argentina)	1–2	(Argentina) Atlético Tucumán	Avellaneda, Argentina
	G. Gómez	Report	M. Osores; F. Grahl	Stadium: Estadio Julio Humberto Grondona

10 August 2017 Friendly	Arsenal de Sarandí (Argentina)	0–0	(Argentina) Yupanqui	Avellaneda, Argentina
		Report		Stadium: Estadio Julio Humberto Grondona

10 August 2017 Friendly	Arsenal de Sarandí (Argentina)	1–0	(Argentina) Yupanqui	Avellaneda, Argentina
	R. Palermo	Report		Stadium: Estadio Julio Humberto Grondona

11 August 2017 Friendly	Arsenal de Sarandí (Argentina)	Cancelled	(Argentina) Temperley
		Report

15 August 2017 Friendly	Arsenal de Sarandí (Argentina)	4–1	(Argentina) Victoriano Arenas	Avellaneda, Argentina
	J. Brunetta; R. Carrera; L. Rolón	Report	Goal	Stadium: Estadio Julio Humberto Grondona

15 August 2017 Friendly	Arsenal de Sarandí (Argentina)	4–2	(Argentina) Victoriano Arenas	Avellaneda, Argentina
	Goal	Report	Goal	Stadium: Estadio Julio Humberto Grondona

16 August 2017 Friendly	Arsenal de Sarandí (Argentina)	3–0	(Argentina) UAI Urquiza	Avellaneda, Argentina
	L. Rolón; R. Contreras	Report		Stadium: Estadio Julio Humberto Grondona

16 August 2017 Friendly	Arsenal de Sarandí (Argentina)	2–3	(Argentina) UAI Urquiza	Avellaneda, Argentina
	J. Brunetta; M. Carabajal	Report	Goal	Stadium: Estadio Julio Humberto Grondona

18 August 2017 Friendly	Arsenal de Sarandí (Argentina)	1–1	(Argentina) Tristán Suárez	Avellaneda, Argentina
	F. Fragapane	Report	L. López	Stadium: Estadio Julio Humberto Grondona

18 August 2017 Friendly	Arsenal de Sarandí (Argentina)	Abandoned	(Argentina) Tristán Suárez	Avellaneda, Argentina
	F. Fragapane	Report		Stadium: Estadio Julio Humberto Grondona

== Primera División ==
=== League table ===
Pos	Team	Pld	W	D	L	GF	GA	GD	Pts
24	Tigre	27	4	12	11	26	33	−7	24
25	Temperley	27	5	8	14	22	46	−24	23
26	Chacarita Juniors	27	4	6	17	23	40	−17	18
27	Arsenal	27	3	8	16	19	36	−17	17
28	Olimpo	27	3	6	18	16	50	−34	15

Source: AFA
Rules for classification: 1) points; 2) play-off (only if needed to decide championship); 3) goal difference; 4) goals scored; 5) head-to-head points; 6) head-to-head goal difference; 7) head-to-head goals scored.

=== Results by matchday ===
Matchday	1	2	3	4	5	6	7	8	9	10	11	12	13	14	15	16	17	18	19	20	21	22	23	24	25	26	27
Ground	A	H	A	H	A	H	A	H	A	H	A	H	A														
Result	L	L	L	L	W	L	L	D	D	L	L	L															
Position	20	26	28	28	24	24	26	26	27	28	28	28															

Updated to match(es) played on 12 December 2017. Source: Soccerway
A = Away; H = Home; W = Win; D = Draw; L = Loss

28 August 2017 1	Estudiantes (Argentina)	2–1	(Argentina) Arsenal de Sarandí	La Plata, Argentina
21:05	L. Melano 80'; C. Alemán 86'	Report	R. Contreras 39'	Stadium: Estadio Ciudad de La Plata; Referee: Silvio Trucco (Argentina)

8 September 2017 2	Arsenal de Sarandí (Argentina)	0–1	(Argentina) Colón	Avellaneda, Argentina
19:05		Report	T. Chancalay 68'	Stadium: Estadio Julio Humberto Grondona; Referee: Ariel Penel (Argentina)

16 September 2017 3	San Lorenzo (Argentina)	1–0	(Argentina) Arsenal de Sarandí	Buenos Aires, Argentina
18:05	M. Senesi 75'	Report		Stadium: Estadio Pedro Bidegain; Referee: Federico Beligoy (Argentina)

23 September 2017 4	Arsenal de Sarandí (Argentina)	0–1	(Argentina) Temperley	Avellaneda, Argentina
14:05		Report	R. Costa 40'	Stadium: Estadio Julio Humberto Grondona; Referee: Andrés Merlos (Argentina)

2 October 2017 5	Banfield (Argentina)	1–2	(Argentina) Arsenal de Sarandí	Banfield, Argentina
19:05	J. Álvarez 12'	Report	F. Milo 65'; G. Ferreyra 87'	Stadium: Estadio Florencio Sola; Referee: Jorge Baliño (Argentina)

16 October 2017 6	Arsenal de Sarandí (Argentina)	0–1	(Argentina) San Martín	Avellaneda, Argentina
21:05		Report	G. Carabajal 55'	Stadium: Estadio Julio Humberto Grondona; Referee: Diego Abal (Argentina)

27 October 2017 7	Argentinos Juniors (Argentina)	3–2	(Argentina) Arsenal de Sarandí	Buenos Aires, Argentina
21:05	J. Sandoval 32'; D. Batallini 37'; L. Pisculichi 82'	Report	F. Monteseirín 6'; Mosquito 17'	Stadium: Estadio Diego Armando Maradona; Referee: Ariel Penel (Argentina)

6 November 2017 8	Arsenal de Sarandí (Argentina)	0–0	(Argentina) Tigre	Avellaneda, Argentina
17:05		Report		Stadium: Estadio Julio Humberto Grondona; Referee: Patricio Loustau (Argentina)

17 November 2017 9	Atlético Tucumán (Argentina)	0–0	(Argentina) Arsenal de Sarandí	San Miguel de Tucumán, Argentina
19:15		Report		Stadium: Estadio Monumental José Fierro; Referee: Germán Delfino (Argentina)

27 November 2017 10	Arsenal de Sarandí (Argentina)	0–1	(Argentina) Talleres	Avellaneda, Argentina
17:00		Report	N. Giménez 4'	Stadium: Estadio Julio Humberto Grondona; Referee: Mauro Vigliano (Argentina)

3 December 2017 11	Boca Juniors (Argentina)	2–0	(Argentina) Arsenal de Sarandí	Buenos Aires, Argentina
19:15	G. Vadalá 35'; E. Cardona 90+2'	Report		Stadium: La Bombonera; Referee: Facundo Tello (Argentina)

9 December 2017 12	Arsenal de Sarandí (Argentina)	1–2	(Argentina) Independiente	Avellaneda, Argentina
21:30	L. Wilchez 80'	Report	L. Fernández 18'; E. Denis 90+1'	Stadium: Estadio Julio Humberto Grondona; Referee: Federico Beligoy (Argentina)

January 2018 13	Newell's Old Boys (Argentina)	–	(Argentina) Arsenal de Sarandí	Rosario, Argentina
		Report		Stadium: Estadio Marcelo Bielsa

== Copa Argentina ==
Win Draw Loss

–

== Copa Sudamericana ==
Win Draw Loss

=== Second stage ===
6 July 2017 First leg	Sport Recife (Brazil)	2–0	(Argentina) Arsenal de Sarandí	Recife, Brazil
21:45	André 54', 72'	Report		Stadium: Estádio Ilha do Retiro; Referee: Gery Vargas (Bolivia)

27 July 2017 Second leg	Arsenal de Sarandí (Argentina)	2–1 (agg: 2–3)	(Brazil) Sport Recife	Avellaneda, Argentina
19:15	J. Brunetta 43'; R. Contreras 64'	Report	André 82'	Stadium: Estadio Julio Humberto Grondona; Referee: Jesús Valenzuela (Venezuela)
