= 2016 COTIF Tournament =

2016 L'Alcúdia International Football Tournament
Torneo Internacional de Futbol sub-20 COTIF

Tournament details
- Host country: Spain
- Dates: 24 July 2016 – 4 August 2016
- Teams: 10 (from 4 confederations)
- Venue: 1 (in 1 host city)

Final positions
- Champions: Spain
- Runners-up: Argentina

The 2016 L'Alcúdia International Football Tournament is a football competition which took place in July and August 2016. The 2016 edition was the first to feature only international youth teams. Previous editions have contained a mix of national selections and club selections.

== Teams ==
The participating national teams are:

- Argentina
- Bahrain
- Costa Rica
- Mauritania
- Mexico
- Morocco
- Qatar
- Spain
- United States
- Venezuela

Notes

- China and Russia were announced as participants when eight teams had been announced but were later replaced with Costa Rica, Mauritania, Morocco and Venezuela.

== Group stage ==
=== Group A ===
| Pos | Team | Pld | W | D | L | GF | GA | GD | Pts | Qualification |
|---|---|---|---|---|---|---|---|---|---|---|
| 1 | Spain (H, A) | 4 | 3 | 0 | 1 | 8 | 3 | +5 | 9 | Semi-finals |
| 2 | Venezuela (A) | 4 | 2 | 1 | 1 | 5 | 2 | +3 | 7 | Semi-finals |
| 3 | Bahrain | 4 | 2 | 1 | 1 | 5 | 5 | 0 | 7 | |
| 4 | United States | 4 | 2 | 0 | 2 | 3 | 5 | −2 | 6 | |
| 5 | Mauritania | 4 | 0 | 0 | 4 | 2 | 8 | −6 | 0 | |

Updated to match(es) played on 1 August 2016. Source:
(A) Advance to a further round; (H) Hosts
25 July 2016
19:00

| Venezuela | 2–0 | Mauritania |
|---|---|---|
| Soteldo 29'; Herrera 55' | Report |

Estadi Municipal Els Arcs, Alcúdia
25 July 2016
21:15

| Spain | 3–0 | Bahrain |
|---|---|---|
| Rubén 37'; Joel 45'; Rodríguez 69' | Report |

Estadi Municipal Els Arcs, Alcúdia
26 July 2016
22:30

| United States | 0–2 | Venezuela |
|---|---|---|
| | Report | García 49'; Balza 54' |

Estadi Municipal Els Arcs, Alcúdia
27 July 2016
21:15

| Spain | 3–1 | Mauritania |
|---|---|---|
| Rodríguez 1'; Otegui 68'; Navarro 69' | Report | Salem 71' |

Estadi Municipal Els Arcs, Alcúdia
28 July 2016
19:00

| Bahrain | 0–0 | Venezuela |
|---|---|---|
| | Report |

Estadi Municipal Els Arcs, Alcúdia
28 July 2016
21:15

| United States | 1–0 | Mauritania |
|---|---|---|
| Mihailovic 40' | Report |

Estadi Municipal Els Arcs, Alcúdia
29 July 2016
22:30

| Spain | 0–1 | United States |
|---|---|---|
| | Report | Vazquez 52' |

Estadi Municipal Els Arcs, Alcúdia
30 July 2016
20:00

| Bahrain | 2–1 | Mauritania |
|---|---|---|
| | Report |

Estadi Municipal Els Arcs, Alcúdia
31 July 2016
20:15

| Spain | 2–1 | Venezuela |
|---|---|---|
| Rodriguez 12'; Peru 43' | Report | Pena 38' |

Estadi Municipal Els Arcs, Alcúdia
1 August 2016
20:00

| United States | 1–3 | Bahrain |
|---|---|---|
| Lankford 34' | Report | Khalid 44', 50', 62' |

Estadi Municipal Els Arcs, Alcúdia

=== Group B ===
| Pos | Team | Pld | W | D | L | GF | GA | GD | Pts | Qualification |
|---|---|---|---|---|---|---|---|---|---|---|
| 1 | Argentina (A) | 4 | 3 | 1 | 0 | 7 | 1 | +6 | 10 | Semi-finals |
| 2 | Qatar (A) | 4 | 2 | 1 | 1 | 5 | 2 | +3 | 7 | Semi-finals |
| 3 | Mexico | 4 | 1 | 3 | 0 | 4 | 1 | +3 | 6 | |
| 4 | Costa Rica | 4 | 1 | 1 | 2 | 3 | 3 | 0 | 4 | |
| 5 | Morocco | 4 | 0 | 0 | 4 | 0 | 12 | −12 | 0 | |

Updated to match(es) played on 1 August 2016. Source: cotifalcudia.com
(A) Advance to a further round
24 July 2016
22:30

| Mexico | 0–0 | Costa Rica |
|---|---|---|
| | Report |

Estadi Municipal Els Arcs, Alcúdia
25 July 2016
23:15

| Argentina | 3–0 | Morocco |
|---|---|---|
| | (awarded) |

Estadi Municipal Els Arcs, Alcúdia
26 July 2016
20:00

| Argentina | 2–0 | Qatar |
|---|---|---|
| Conechny 9'; Martínez 13' | Report |

Estadi Municipal Els Arcs, Alcúdia
27 July 2016
19:00

| Costa Rica | 3–0 | Morocco |
|---|---|---|
| | (awarded) |

Estadi Municipal Els Arcs, Alcúdia
27 July 2016
23:15

| Mexico | 0–0 | Qatar |
|---|---|---|
| | Report |

Estadi Municipal Els Arcs, Alcúdia
28 July 2016
23:15

| Argentina | 1–1 | Mexico |
|---|---|---|
| Cirigliano 56' | Report | Aguirre 61' |

Estadi Municipal Els Arcs, Alcúdia
29 July 2016
20:00

| Qatar | 3–0 | Morocco |
|---|---|---|
| | (awarded) |

Estadi Municipal Els Arcs, Alcúdia
30 July 2016
22:30

| Argentina | 1–0 | Costa Rica |
|---|---|---|
| Purita 41' | Report |

Estadi Municipal Els Arcs, Alcúdia
31 July 2016
23:15

| Mexico | 3–0 | Morocco |
|---|---|---|
| | (awarded) |

Estadi Municipal Els Arcs, Alcúdia
1 August 2016
22:30

| Qatar | 2–0 | Costa Rica |
|---|---|---|
| Hazem 54'; Hassan 56' | Report |

Estadi Municipal Els Arcs, Alcúdia

== Play-off stage ==
Semi-finals
2 August
Spain | 2
Qatar | 0
2 August
Argentina | 2
Venezuela | 1

Final
4 August
Spain (a.e.t.) | 3
Argentina | 1

=== Semi-finals ===
2 August 2016
21:15

| Spain | 2–0 | Qatar |
|---|---|---|
| ?, ? | Report |

Estadi Municipal Els Arcs, Alcúdia

2 August 2016
23:15

| Argentina | 2–1 | Venezuela |
|---|---|---|
| Martínez (pen.); Mansilla | Report | Herrera |

Estadi Municipal Els Arcs, Alcúdia

=== Final ===
4 August 2016
22:30

| Spain | 3–1 (a.e.t.) | Argentina |
|---|---|---|
| ?, ?, ? | Report | ? |

Estadi Municipal Els Arcs, Alcúdia
