= Joel Rodríguez =

Joel Rodríguez may refer to:

- Joel Plata Rodríguez, Spanish gymnast
- Joel Rodríguez (footballer) (born 1998), Spanish footballer
- Joel Rodríguez (sailor) (born 1997), Spanish sailor
- Joel Rodríguez (diver) (born 1974), Mexican diver
