= Federico Milo =

Argentine footballer

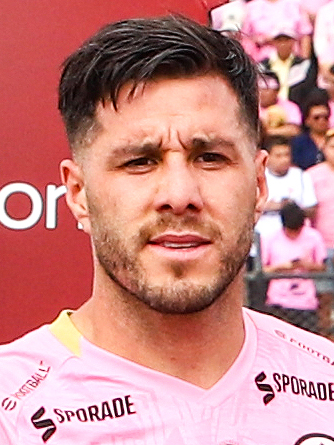

Personal information
- Full name: Federico Emanuel Milo
- Date of birth: 10 January 1992 (age 34)
- Place of birth: Quilmes, Argentina
- Height: 1.83 m (6 ft 0 in)
- Position: Left-back

Team information
- Current team: Godoy Cruz

Youth career
- Arsenal de Sarandí

Senior career*
Years	Team	Apps	(Gls)
2013–2020	Arsenal de Sarandí	65	(4)
2018–2019	→ San Martín SJ (loan)	14	(0)
2019–2020	→ Unión (loan)	18	(0)
2020–2022	Aldosivi	33	(0)
2022–2023	Ionikos	7	(0)
2023–2024	Sport Boys	25	(1)
2024	Gimnasia LP	10	(0)
2024–2025	Independiente Rivadavia	12	(0)
2025–2026	Temperley	20	(1)
2026–	Godoy Cruz	1	(0)
- * Club domestic league appearances and goals as of 18:51, 18 March 2026 (UTC)

Federico Emanuel Milo (born 10 January 1992) is an Argentine professional footballer who plays as a left-back for Godoy Cruz.

== Career ==
Milo began with Argentine Primera División club Arsenal de Sarandí. He made his debut for the club on 22 September 2013 in a league draw with Rosario Central. Two more Primera División appearances followed during 2013–14 before he made his continental debut as he featured in Arsenal's 3–0 victory against Santos Laguna in the 2014 Copa Libertadores. He went onto make 26 appearances in all competitions for Arsenal between the 2013–14 season and the 2016 season. Milo was loaned to fellow Primera División team San Martín in July 2018.

== Career statistics ==
As of 11 September 2018.

Club statistics
Club	Season	League			Cup (Note: Includes the Copa Argentina.)		League Cup		Continental (Note: Includes the Copa Libertadores and Copa Sudamericana)		Other		Total	
Club	Season	Division	Apps	Goals	Apps	Goals	Apps	Goals	Apps	Goals	Apps	Goals	Apps	Goals
Arsenal de Sarandí	2013–14	Primera División	7	0	0	0	—		1 (Note: One appearance in 2014 Copa Libertadores)	0	0	0	8	0
Arsenal de Sarandí	2014	Primera División	1	0	0	0	—		0	0	0	0	1	0
Arsenal de Sarandí	2015	Primera División	17	0	1	0	—		1 (Note: One appearance in 2015 Copa Sudamericana)	0	0	0	19	0
Arsenal de Sarandí	2016	Primera División	2	0	0	0	—		—		0	0	2	0
Arsenal de Sarandí	2016–17	Primera División	16	3	1	0	—		1 (Note: One appearance in 2017 Copa Sudamericana)	0	0	0	18	3
Arsenal de Sarandí	2017–18	Primera División	22	1	1	0	—		2 (Note: Two appearances in 2017 Copa Sudamericana)	0	0	0	25	1
Arsenal de Sarandí	2018–19	Primera B Nacional	0	0	0	0	—		—		0	0	0	0
Arsenal de Sarandí	Total		65	4	3	0	—		5	0	0	0	73	4
San Martín (loan)	2018–19	Primera División	2	0	0	0	—		—		0	0	2	0
Career total			67	4	3	0	—		5	0	0	0	75	4

== Honours ==
Arsenal de Sarandí

- Copa Argentina: 2012–13
