= Church of St. Jaume =

Roman Catholic church in Alcúdia, Majorca

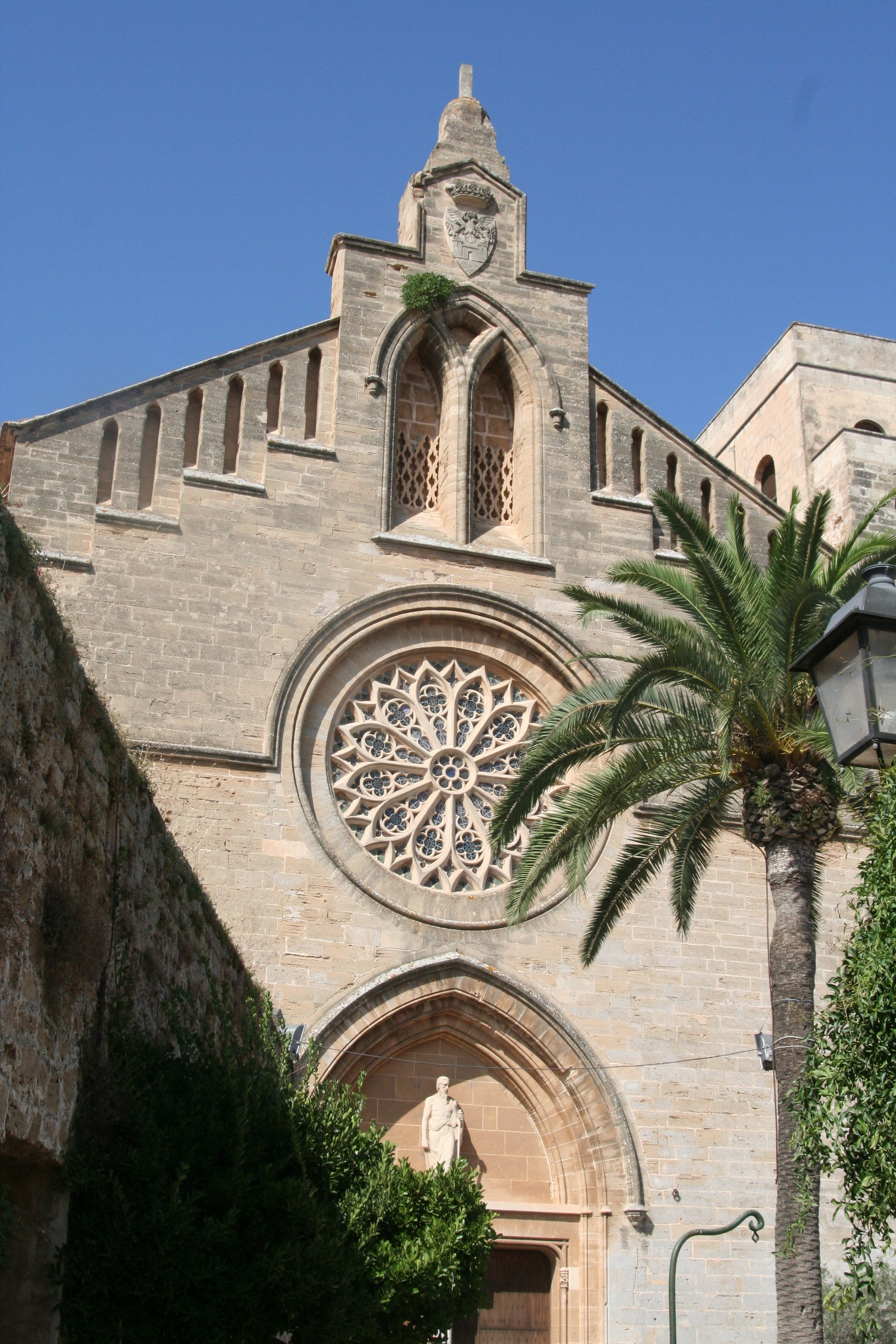

Religion
- Affiliation: Roman Catholic

Location
- Location: Alcúdia
- Country: Spain
- Interactive map of Church of St. Jaume
- Coordinates: 39.851449°N 3.120631°E

Architecture
- Style: Romanesque
- Spire: 1

The Church of St. Jaume is a Roman Catholic church in Alcúdia, Majorca.

== History ==
The land was given up for the building of the Church in 1302 by the King of Majorca, James III of Majorca.

=== Saintly Christ Chapel ===
The construction of this monumental chapel is a consequence of the increasing devotion that Alcudia and the neighbouring villages felt for Saint Christ. It was believed that Saint Christ had sweated water and blood in 1507 in the cave of Sant Marti (on the outskirts of the city) to implore for rain during a drought. The first stone was laid on 8 December 1675 and the works finished in 1697. The chapel is notable for the central dome and four side chapels along with the altar piece which is a spectacular work of baroque art. The latter shows the l'horror vacui and is the work of sculptor Mateu Joan i Serra and was made between 1699 and 1703. The altarpiece was restored in 2007 on the occasion of the 500th anniversary of Saint Christ.

=== Main Altar ===
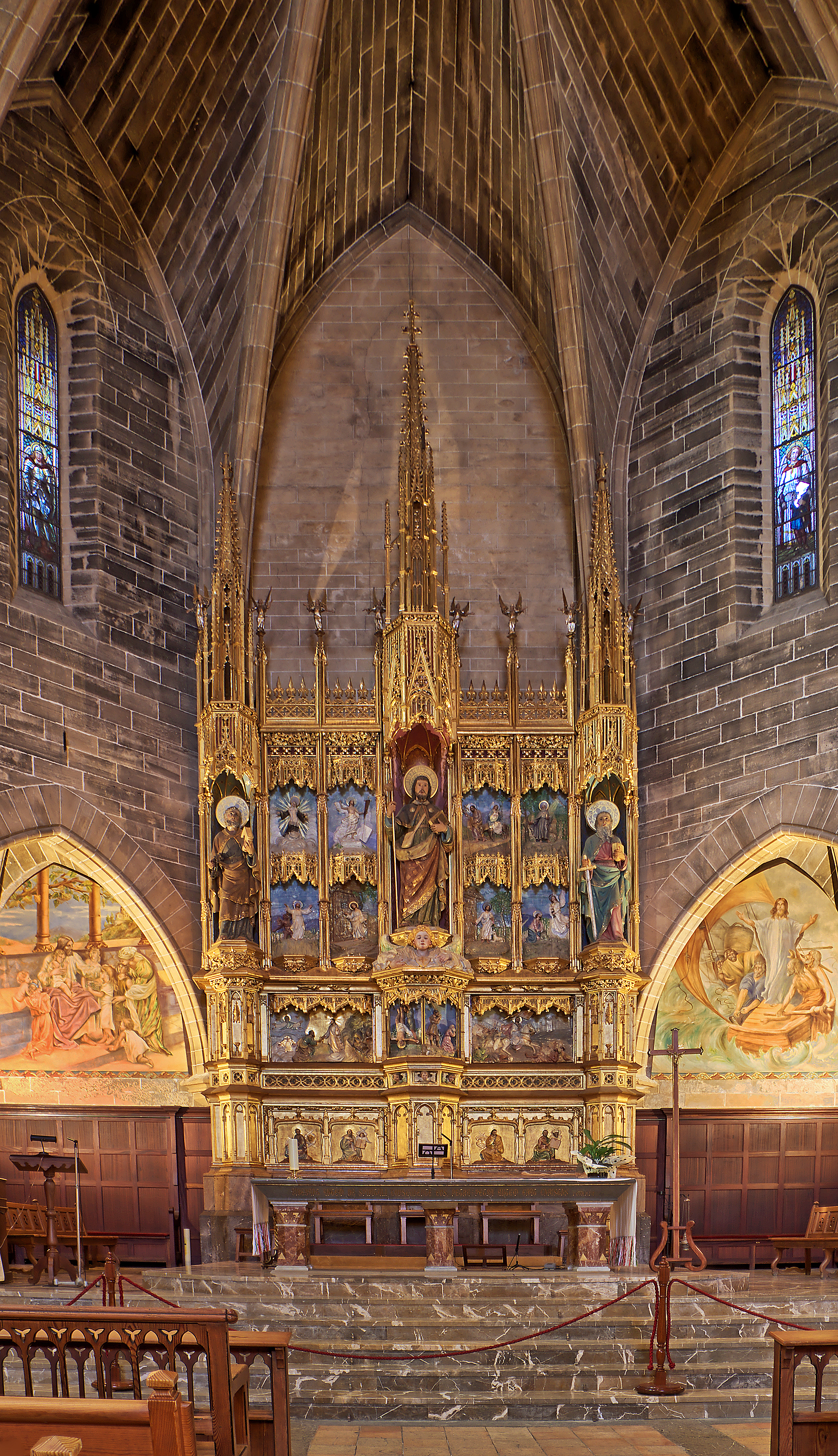
Main altar

The main altar piece was constructed over two periods, the stonemasonry is that of sculptor Llorenc Ferrer i Marti, the rest was made by Miquel Arcas. In the centre of the altarpiece is an image of Saint James, patron saint of Alcudia and the parish.

== Style ==
The construction is neo-Gothic with a major reconstruction of part of the building being completed in 1893.
