= Bryan Schmidt (footballer) =

Argentine footballer

Personal information
- Full name: Bryan Carlos Schmidt
- Date of birth: 19 November 1995 (age 30)
- Place of birth: La Plata, Argentina
- Height: 1.79 m (5 ft 10 in)
- Position: Forward

Team information
- Current team: ADB

Youth career
- Arsenal de Sarandí

Senior career*
Years	Team	Apps	(Gls)
2013–2018	Arsenal de Sarandí	6	(0)
2018–2019	Destroyers	21	(1)
2019–	Villa San Carlos	0	(0)
- * Club domestic league appearances and goals as of 00:01, 16 August 2019 (UTC)

Bryan Carlos Schmidt (born 19 November 1995) is an Argentine professional footballer who plays as a forward for Villa San Carlos.

== Career ==
Schmidt started in the youth of Argentine Primera División club Arsenal de Sarandí. He first featured in the senior matchday squad when he was selected on the substitutes bench for a 2013–14 league match against Belgrano on 11 May 2014. He subsequently made his first-team debut the following season on 6 December in a 1–6 away win against Atlético de Rafaela, his only appearance during the 2014 campaign. He made another appearance in the 2015 Argentine Primera División season. Destroyers of the Bolivian Primera División signed Schmidt in June 2018. He scored his first career goal on 19 August versus San José.

Schmidt wasn't registered by Destroyers for the 2019 campaign due to foreigner limits, though the club agreed to honour the remainder of his contract; until 30 June 2019. In the succeeding August, Schmidt returned to Argentina with Primera B Metropolitana's Villa San Carlos.

== Career statistics ==
As of 16 August 2019.

Club statistics
Club	Season	League			Cup		League Cup		Continental		Other		Total	
Club	Season	Division	Apps	Goals	Apps	Goals	Apps	Goals	Apps	Goals	Apps	Goals	Apps	Goals
Arsenal de Sarandí	2013–14	Argentine Primera División	0	0	0	0	—		0	0	0	0	0	0
Arsenal de Sarandí	2014	Argentine Primera División	1	0	0	0	—		—		0	0	1	0
Arsenal de Sarandí	2015	Argentine Primera División	1	0	0	0	—		—		0	0	1	0
Arsenal de Sarandí	2016	Argentine Primera División	0	0	0	0	—		—		0	0	0	0
Arsenal de Sarandí	2016–17	Argentine Primera División	0	0	0	0	—		0	0	0	0	0	0
Arsenal de Sarandí	2017–18	Argentine Primera División	4	0	0	0	—		—		0	0	4	0
Arsenal de Sarandí	Total		6	0	0	0	—		0	0	0	0	6	0
Destroyers	2018	Bolivian Primera División	21	1	0	0	—		—		2 (Note: Appearance(s) in the Bolivian Primera División play-offs)	0	23	1
Destroyers	2019	Bolivian Primera División	0	0	0	0	—		—		0	0	0	0
Destroyers	Total		21	1	0	0	—		—		0	0	21	1
Villa San Carlos	2019–20	Primera B Metropolitana	0	0	0	0	—		—		0	0	0	0
Career total			27	1	0	0	—		0	0	2	0	29	1
