= Gonzalo Giménez =

Argentine footballer

Personal information
- Full name: Gonzalo Emiliano Giménez
- Date of birth: 4 September 1995 (age 31)
- Place of birth: Lanús, Argentina
- Height: 1.80 m (5 ft 11 in)
- Position: Midfielder

Team information
- Current team: Almagro

Youth career
- Arsenal de Sarandí

Senior career*
Years	Team	Apps	(Gls)
2015–2017	Arsenal de Sarandí	5	(0)
2017–2018	Estudiantes	6	(0)
2018–2020	Flandria	56	(5)
2020–	Almagro	18	(2)
- * Club domestic league appearances and goals as of 19:43, 7 June 2022 (UTC)

Gonzalo Emiliano Giménez (born 4 September 1995) is an Argentine professional footballer who plays as a midfielder for Almagro.

== Career ==
Giménez made his debut for Arsenal de Sarandí after coming from the youth ranks in an Argentine Primera División match against Crucero del Norte on 1 June 2015. Five more appearances followed in all competitions for Giménez in 2016 and 2016–17 respectively between February and October 2016. In September 2017, Giménez joined Estudiantes of Primera B Metropolitana. He made his debut on 24 September in a 1–1 draw versus Colegiales. Fellow Primera B Metropolitana team Flandria signed Giménez in June 2018. In his first start, he scored his first senior goal in a win over Comunicaciones on 29 August.

In August 2020, Giménez moved up to Primera B Nacional with Almagro.

== Career statistics ==
As of 1 September 2020.

Club statistics
Club	Season	League			Cup		League Cup		Continental		Other		Total	
Club	Season	Division	Apps	Goals	Apps	Goals	Apps	Goals	Apps	Goals	Apps	Goals	Apps	Goals
Arsenal de Sarandí	2015	Primera División	1	0	0	0	—		0	0	0	0	1	0
Arsenal de Sarandí	2016	Primera División	1	0	0	0	—		—		0	0	1	0
Arsenal de Sarandí	2016–17	Primera División	3	0	1	0	—		—		0	0	4	0
Arsenal de Sarandí	2017–18	Primera División	0	0	0	0	—		0	0	0	0	0	0
Arsenal de Sarandí	Total		5	0	1	0	—		0	0	0	0	6	0
Estudiantes	2017–18	Primera B Metropolitana	6	0	0	0	—		—		0	0	6	0
Flandria	2018–19	Primera B Metropolitana	34	3	0	0	—		—		0	0	34	3
Flandria	2019–20	Primera B Metropolitana	22	2	0	0	—		—		0	0	22	2
Flandria	Total		56	5	0	0	—		—		0	0	56	5
Almagro	2020–21	Primera B Nacional	0	0	0	0	—		—		0	0	0	0
Career total			67	5	1	0	—		0	0	0	0	68	5
