= Port of Alcudia =

Port facility in Mallorca, Spain

Alcudia
- Interactive map of Alcudia
- Location within Spain

Location
- Country: Spain
- Location: Mallorca
- Coordinates: 39°50′N 3°8′E
- UN/LOCODE: ESALD

Details
- No. of berths: 6
- Draft depth: Draft 8.0 metres (26.2 ft)

The Port of Alcudia is a port facility in the town of Alcudia in northern Mallorca, Spain. It handles primarily passenger ferries, but also some bulk and breakbulk cargo and a dolphin berth for LPG carriers.

It has ferry services to Menorca, Barcelona as well as Toulon in France.
