= Leandro Godoy =

Argentine footballer

Personal information
- Full name: Leandro Hernán Godoy
- Date of birth: 9 December 1994 (age 31)
- Place of birth: Bernal, Argentina
- Position: Defender

Youth career
- Arsenal de Sarandí

Senior career*
Years	Team	Apps	(Gls)
2014–2017	Arsenal de Sarandí	6	(1)
2016	→ Barracas Central (loan)	6	(0)
- * Club domestic league appearances and goals

Leandro Hernán Godoy (born 9 December 1994) is an Argentine professional footballer who plays as a defender. He is currently a free agent.

== Career ==
Godoy's career started with Argentine Primera División club Arsenal de Sarandí, he made his debut for Arsenal in a 2013–14 Argentine Primera División fixture on 11 May 2014 as the club drew 0–0 with Belgrano. Six more appearances followed in the 2014 and 2015 seasons, including one in a 1–6 away win against Atlético de Rafaela during which Godoy scored his first career goal. On 4 January 2016, Godoy completed a loan move to Primera B Metropolitana side Barracas Central. He appeared in six fixtures before returning to Arsenal. In January 2018, Godoy terminated his contract with Arsenal.

== Career statistics ==
As of 3 February 2018.

Club statistics
Club	Season	League			Cup (Note: Includes the Copa Argentina)		League Cup		Continental (Note: Includes the Copa Libertadores and Copa Sudamericana)		Other		Total	
Club	Season	Division	Apps	Goals	Apps	Goals	Apps	Goals	Apps	Goals	Apps	Goals	Apps	Goals
Arsenal de Sarandí	2013–14	Primera División	1	0	0	0	—		0	0	0	0	1	0
Arsenal de Sarandí	2014	Primera División	2	1	0	0	—		0	0	0	0	2	1
Arsenal de Sarandí	2015	Primera División	3	0	1	0	—		0	0	0	0	4	0
Arsenal de Sarandí	2016	Primera División	0	0	0	0	—		—		0	0	0	0
Arsenal de Sarandí	2016–17	Primera División	0	0	0	0	—		—		0	0	0	0
Arsenal de Sarandí	2017–18	Primera División	0	0	0	0	—		—		0	0	0	0
Arsenal de Sarandí	Total		6	1	1	0	—		0	0	0	0	7	1
Barracas Central (loan)	2016	Primera B Metropolitana	6	0	0	0	—		0	0	0	0	6	0
Career total			12	1	1	0	—		0	0	0	0	13	1
