= Emiliano Purita =

Argentine footballer

Personal information
- Full name: Emiliano Purita
- Date of birth: 25 March 1997 (age 29)
- Place of birth: Buenos Aires, Argentina
- Height: 1.67 m (5 ft 5 1/2 in)
- Positions: Right-back; wing-back

Team information
- Current team: All Boys

Youth career
- San Lorenzo

Senior career*
Years	Team	Apps	(Gls)
2016–2019	San Lorenzo	0	(0)
2017–2018	→ Arsenal de Sarandí (loan)	19	(1)
2018–2019	→ San Martín (loan)	16	(0)
2019–2021	San Martín	26	(3)
2021–2022	Volos	20	(0)
2022–2024	Dnipro-1	7	(0)
2024–2025	Patronato	26	(0)
2025–2026	Arsenal Sarandí	31	(2)
2026–	All Boys	5	(1)

International career
2016	Argentina U20	3	(1)
- * Club domestic league appearances and goals as of 17:42, 25 March 2026 (UTC)

Emiliano Purita (born 25 March 1997) is an Argentine professional footballer who plays as a right-back for All Boys.

== Career ==
=== Club ===
Purita began his senior career in 2016 with Argentine Primera División side San Lorenzo, appearing on the substitutes bench for a match against Newell's Old Boys on 30 October. In August 2017, Purita joined fellow top-flight club Arsenal de Sarandí on loan. He made his debut in a home defeat to Temperley. Purita's first career goal arrived on 5 May 2018 during a 4–0 victory over Rosario Central. He spent a second season out on loan in 2018–19, joining newly promoted San Martín in June 2018. On 6 August 2019 it was confirmed, that Purita had terminated his contract with San Lorenzo and signed permanently with San Martín.

=== International ===
Purita represented the Argentina U20s at the 2016 COTIF Tournament in Spain. He played three times, playing against Qatar, Costa Rica and Venezuela. He scored in the match against Costa Rica.

== Career statistics ==
As of 11 September 2018.

Club statistics
Club	Season	League			Cup (Note: Includes the Copa Argentina)		League Cup		Continental (Note: Includes the Copa Libertadores and Copa Sudamericana)		Other		Total	
Club	Season	Division	Apps	Goals	Apps	Goals	Apps	Goals	Apps	Goals	Apps	Goals	Apps	Goals
San Lorenzo	2016–17	Argentine Primera División	0	0	0	0	—		0	0	0	0	0	0
San Lorenzo	2017–18	Argentine Primera División	0	0	0	0	—		0	0	0	0	0	0
San Lorenzo	2018–19	Argentine Primera División	0	0	0	0	—		0	0	0	0	0	0
San Lorenzo	Total		0	0	0	0	—		0	0	0	0	0	0
Arsenal de Sarandí (loan)	2017–18	Argentine Primera División	19	1	0	0	—		0	0	0	0	19	1
San Martín (loan)	2018–19	Argentine Primera División	2	0	1	0	—		0	0	0	0	3	0
Career total			21	1	1	0	—		0	0	0	0	22	1
