= S'Illot =

Uninhabited islet off the north coast of Mallorca, Spain

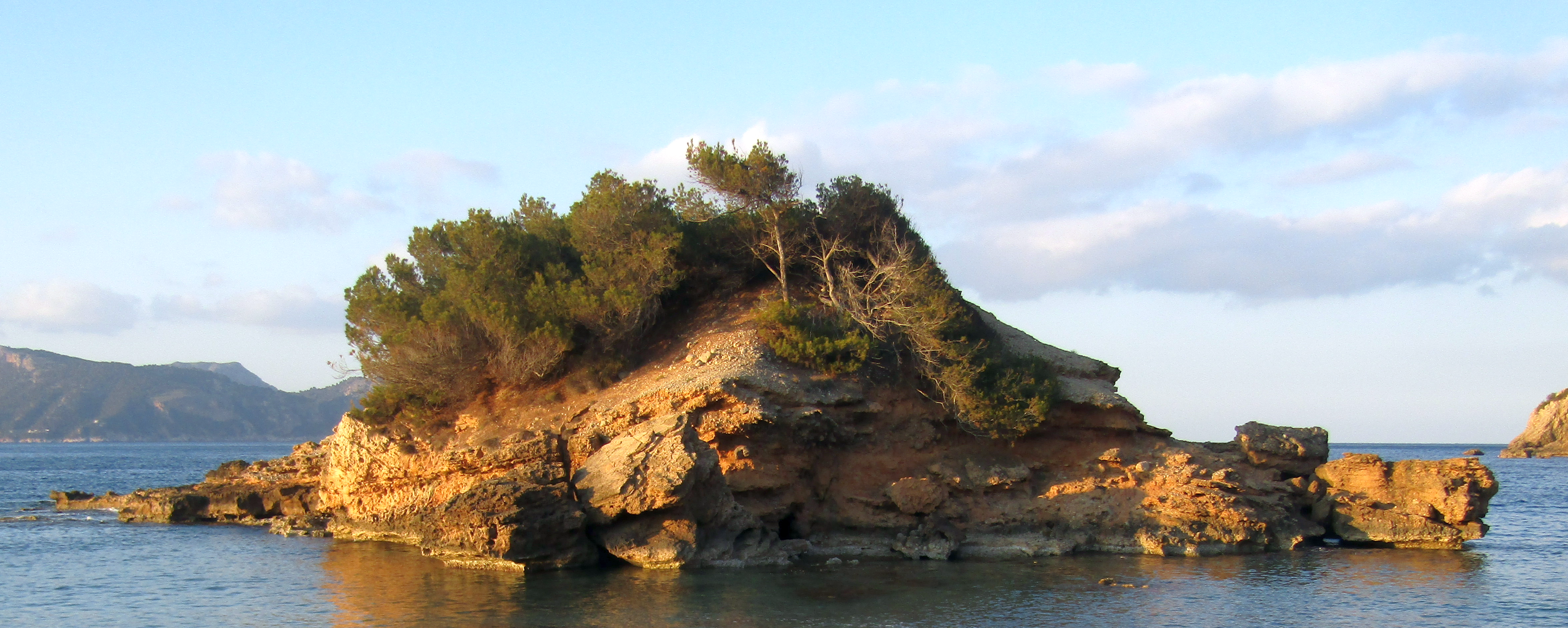

- Location in Spain

Geography
- Location: Mediterranean Sea
- Coordinates: 39.87357°N 3.16206°E
- Archipelago: Balearic Archipelago
- Highest elevation: 12 m (39 ft)

Administration
- Spain
- Autonomous Community: Balearic Islands
- Comarca: Raiguer
- Municipality: Alcúdia

Demographics
- Population: 0

S'Illot is an uninhabited islet in the Balearic Islands, Spain, located in the Mediterranean Sea off the North coast of Mallorca.

== Toponymy ==
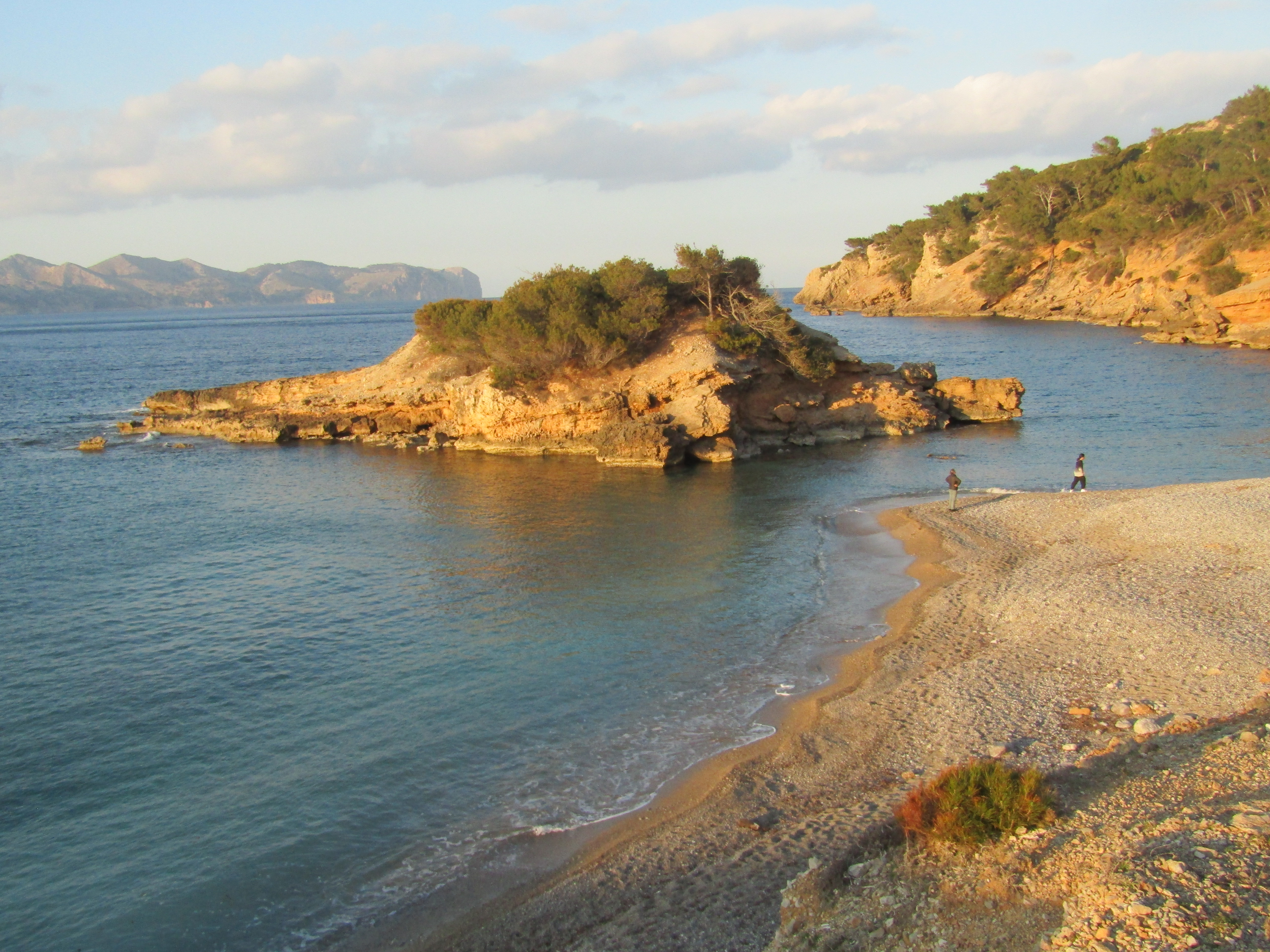
The islet and, in the background, the Formentor peninsula

S'Illot can be translated from Catalan as the little island, and must not be confused with S'illot, a touristic resort on the eastern shores of Mallorca.

== Features ==
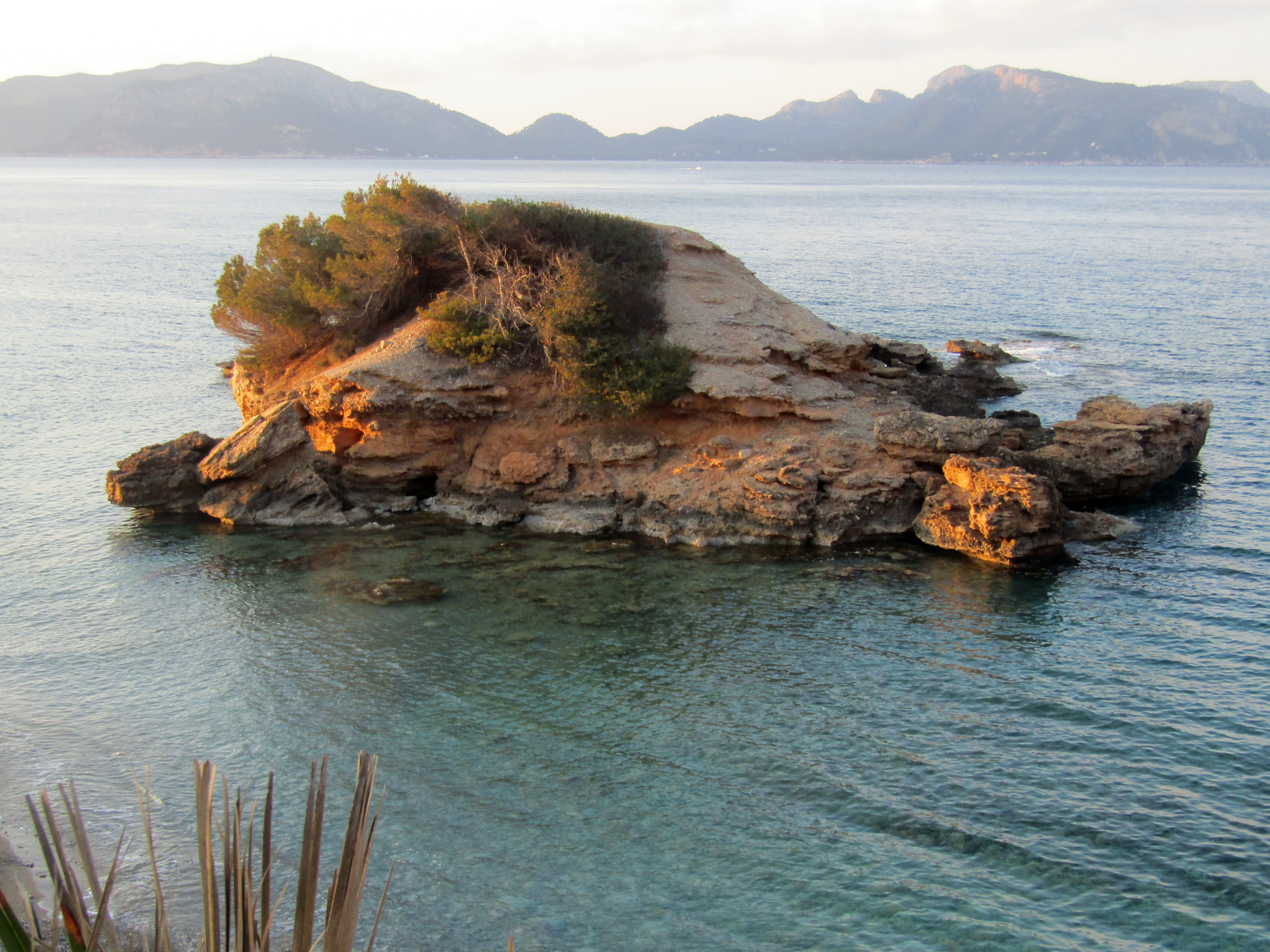
View from the coastal road

The islet is located close to the shore north of Benaire, a town belonging to the municipality Alcúdia. Its maximum elevation on the sea level is 12 ms. The beach in front of the island is known for the good views which offers on the Cap Formentor and its peninsula, and the surrounding stretch of sea is appreciated for snorkelling.

== Geology ==
The island and the neighbouring coast are known by geologists for their late Pleistocene deposits and are considered a very suitable location for teaching Quaternary lithologies and stratigraphic relationships.
