= Germán Niz =

Argentine footballer

Personal information
- Full name: Germán Ariel Niz
- Date of birth: 23 March 1996 (age 30)
- Place of birth: Villa Domínico, Argentina
- Height: 1.87 m (6 ft 2 in)
- Position: Centre-back

Team information
- Current team: Deportivo Carchá

Senior career*
Years	Team	Apps	(Gls)
2016–2017	Arsenal de Sarandí	0	(0)
2016–2017	→ San Telmo (loan)	22	(2)
2017–2019	San Telmo	44	(1)
2019	Deportivo Armenio	7	(0)
2020	Deportivo Iztapa	9	(0)
2020–	Deportivo Carchá		
- * Club domestic league appearances and goals as of 22:17, 16 December 2020 (UTC)

Germán Ariel Niz (born 23 March 1996) is an Argentine professional footballer who plays as a centre-back for Deportivo Carchá.

== Career ==
Niz began his career with Arsenal de Sarandí, during which time he was loaned out to Primera B Metropolitana side San Telmo. He made his professional debut on 10 October 2016 in a win against Deportivo Riestra, prior to scoring his first goal a week later versus Tristán Suárez. Niz eventually scored two goals in twenty-two matches during 2016–17. In August 2017, Niz left Arsenal to join San Telmo permanently. Two seasons later, following one goal in forty-four appearances, Niz left for fellow third tier team Deportivo Armenio. He appeared seven times in five months with the club, with his debut coming against Talleres.

In February 2020, Niz completed a move to Guatemalan football with Deportivo Iztapa. His first match in Liga Nacional arrived on 9 February versus Deportivo Siquinalá, with his second appearance prematurely ending after a seventy-fourth minute red card in a win away to Deportivo Sanarate. Despite renewing his contract in June, the centre-back would terminate it in October and subsequently join Deportivo Carchá of the Primera División de Ascenso.

== Career statistics ==
As of 16 December 2020.

Club statistics
Club	Season	League			Cup		League Cup		Continental		Other		Total	
Club	Season	Division	Apps	Goals	Apps	Goals	Apps	Goals	Apps	Goals	Apps	Goals	Apps	Goals
Arsenal de Sarandí	2016–17	Primera División	0	0	0	0	—		0	0	0	0	0	0
San Telmo (loan)	2016–17	Primera B Metropolitana	22	2	0	0	—		—		0	0	22	2
San Telmo	2017–18	Primera B Metropolitana	28	1	0	0	—		—		0	0	28	1
San Telmo	2018–19	Primera B Metropolitana	16	0	0	0	—		—		0	0	16	0
San Telmo	Total		66	3	0	0	—		—		0	0	66	3
Deportivo Armenio	2019–20	Primera B Metropolitana	7	0	0	0	—		—		0	0	7	0
Deportivo Iztapa	2019–20	Liga Nacional	6	0	0	0	—		—		0	0	6	0
Deportivo Iztapa	2020–21	Liga Nacional	3	0	0	0	—		—		0	0	3	0
Deportivo Iztapa	Total		9	0	0	0	—		—		0	0	9	0
Career total			82	3	0	0	—		0	0	0	0	82	3
