= Tomás Berra =

Argentine footballer

Personal information
- Full name: Tomás Glênio Berra
- Date of birth: 19 February 1991 (age 35)
- Place of birth: Rosario, Argentina
- Height: 1.91 m (6 ft 3 in)
- Position: Centre-back

Team information
- Current team: Alvarado

Youth career
- 2005–2013: Rosario Central

Senior career*
Years	Team	Apps	(Gls)
2013–2016	Rosario Central	31	(0)
2016	Godoy Cruz	0	(0)
2016–2017	Arsenal de Sarandí	2	(0)
2017–2018	Santamarina	7	(0)
2018–2019	Città Messina	27	(0)
2019	Cattolica SM	7	(0)
2019–2020	Ghivizzano Borgoamozzano	7	(1)
2020–2021	Sarmiento de Resistencia	7	(1)
2021	Ciudad de Bolívar	12	(0)
2022	Chacarita Juniors	19	(0)
2023	Alvarado	21	(0)
2024	Güemes	18	(0)
2025	Central Norte	15	(0)
2026–	Alvarado		
- * Club domestic league appearances and goals as of 17:39, 13 January 2026 (UTC)

Tomás Glênio Berra (born 19 February 1991) is an Argentine professional footballer who plays as a centre-back for Alvarado in the Torneo Federal A of Argentina.

== Career ==
Berra started in the youth of Rosario Central, his local team. He remained in the youth ranks between 2005 and 2013 before he was promoted into the first-team squad, he then made his senior debut on 25 March 2013 in a 3–4 win away to Atlético Tucumán in the 2012–13 Primera B Nacional. Rosario won promotion in that season to the 2013–14 Argentine Primera División. He made thirty appearances in his first two seasons (2013–14 and 2014) in Argentina's top-flight but then didn't feature in the 2015 campaign. After the 2015 season, Berra departed Rosario to join top division club Godoy Cruz.

However, he left six months later without making an appearance in 2016. He subsequently joined fellow Primera División club Arsenal de Sarandí. His Arsenal debut came on 18 September versus Temperley. In August 2017, Berra joined Primera B Nacional side Santamarina.

He also played for Italian teams such as Città Messina, Cattolica SM, and Ghivizzano Borgoamozzano, as well as Sarmiento (R), Ciudad Bolívar, Chacarita Jrs, Alvarado, Güemes, and Central Norte, where he played in the 2025 season.

In 2026, he returned to Alvarado, from the Torneo Federal A, where he will have his second stint with the team.

== Career statistics ==
As of 27 May 2018.

Club statistics
Club	Season	League			Cup (Note: Includes the Copa Argentina)		League Cup		Continental (Note: Includes the Copa Sudamericana)		Other		Total	
Club	Season	Division	Apps	Goals	Apps	Goals	Apps	Goals	Apps	Goals	Apps	Goals	Apps	Goals
Rosario Central	2012–13	Primera B Nacional	1	0	0	0	—		0	0	0	0	1	0
Rosario Central	2013–14	Primera División	17	0	0	0	—		0	0	0	0	17	0
Rosario Central	2014	Primera División	13	0	3	0	—		2 (Note: Two appearances in 2014 Copa Sudamericana)	0	0	0	18	0
Rosario Central	2015	Primera División	0	0	0	0	—		0	0	0	0	0	0
Rosario Central	Total		31	0	3	0	—		2	0	0	0	36	0
Godoy Cruz	2016	Primera División	0	0	0	0	—		0	0	0	0	0	0
Arsenal de Sarandí	2016–17	Primera División	2	0	0	0	—		0	0	0	0	2	0
Santamarina	2017–18	Primera B Nacional	7	0	0	0	—		—		0	0	7	0
Career total			40	0	3	0	—		2	0	0	0	45	0

== Honours ==
Rosario Central

- Primera B Nacional: 2012–13
