= Alcúdia =

- Municipality
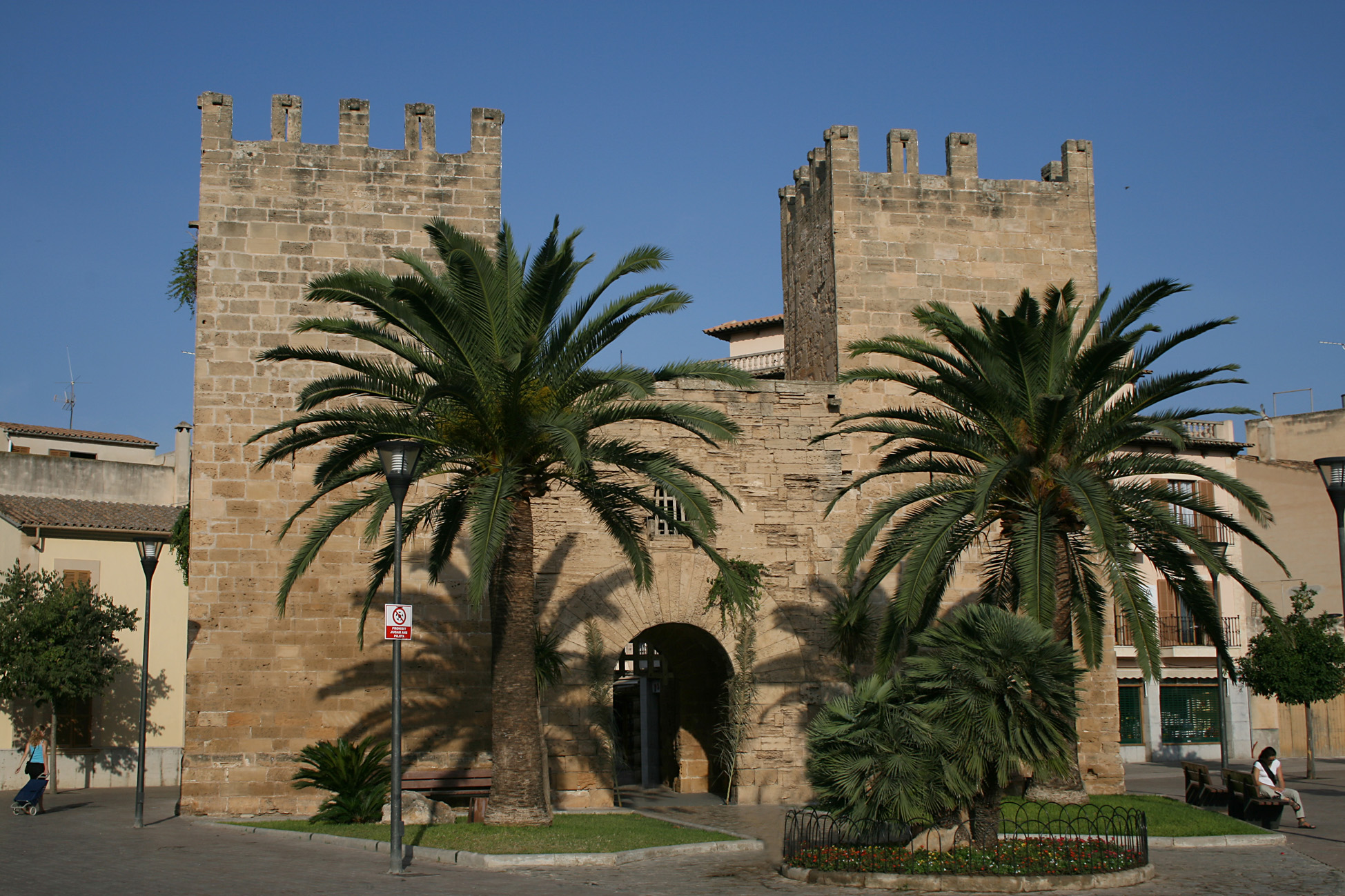
- Gate of the city walls

- Coat of arms

- Map of Alcúdia in Mallorca

- Location in Mallorca Alcúdia (Balearic Islands) Alcúdia (Spain)
- Coordinates: 39°51′9″N 3°7′9″E
- Country: Spain
- Autonomous community: Balearic Islands
- Insular council: Mallorca
- Comarca: Raiguer
- Judicial district: Inca

Government
  - Mayor: Antoni Mir Llabrés (PI)

Area
  - Total: 60.05 km^{2} (23.19 sq mi)
- Elevation: 13 m (43 ft)

Population (2025-01-01)
  - Total: 21,907
  - Density: 364.8/km^{2} (944.9/sq mi)
- Time zone: UTC+1 (CET)
  - Summer (DST): UTC+2 (CEST)
- Postal code: 07400
- Website: www.alcudia.net

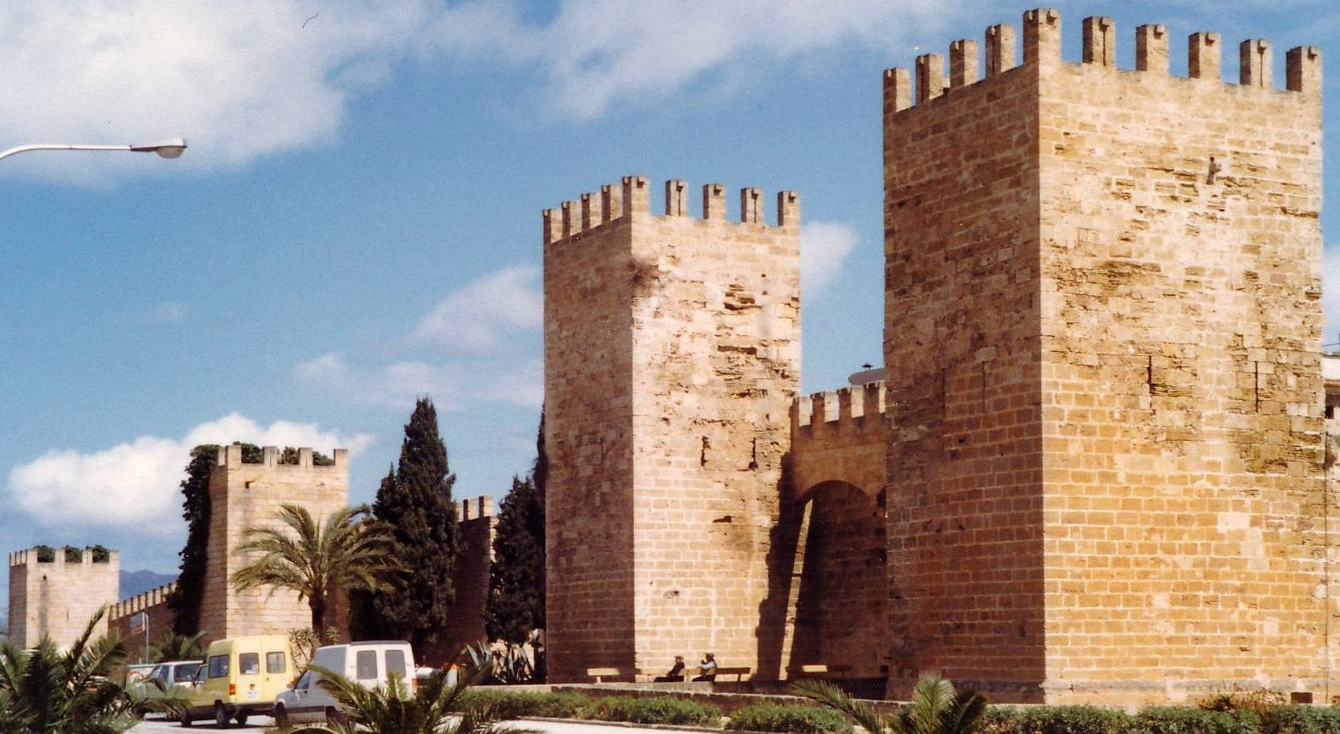
View of the city wall

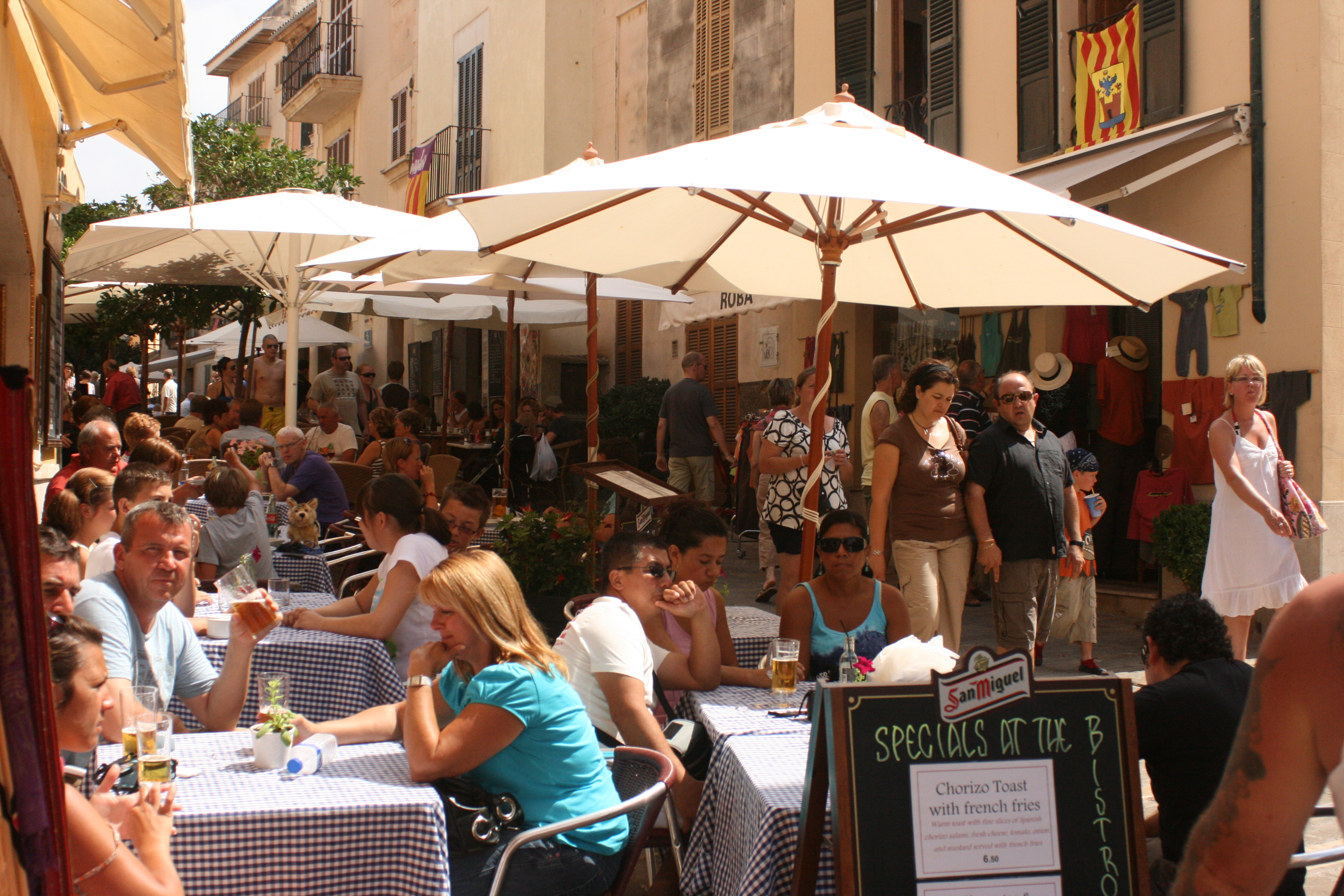
The old town of Alcúdia is famous for its small restaurants.

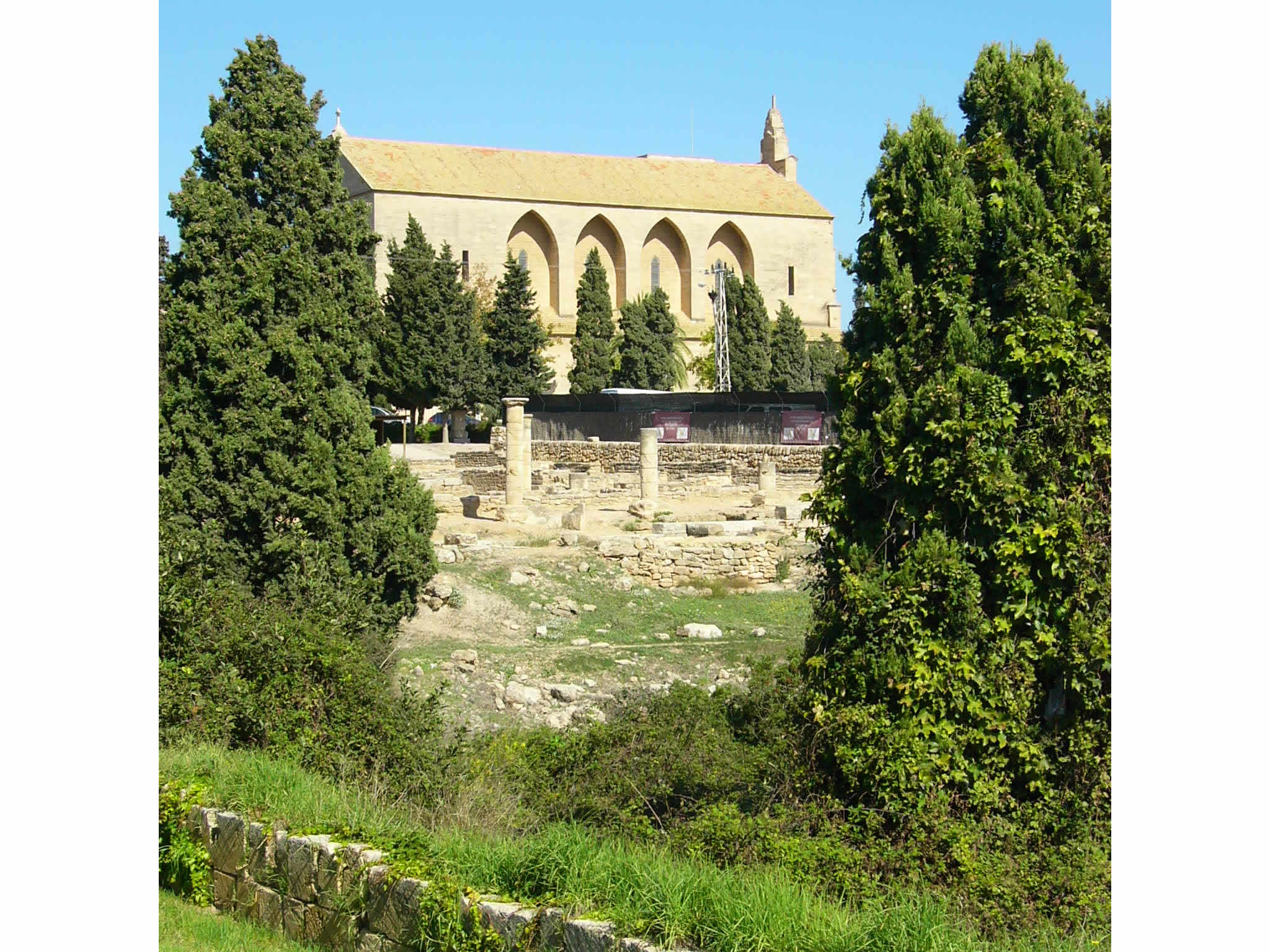
View over the remains of Pollentia and the Church of St. Jaume.

Alcúdia (Balearic Catalan: [əlˈkuðiə], also [əlˈkuði]) is a municipality and township of the Spanish autonomous community of the Balearic Islands. It is the main tourist centre in the north of Mallorca on the eastern coast. It is a large resort popular with tourists. Most of the hotels are located in Port d'Alcúdia and Platja d'Alcúdia, along the 14 km-long (8.7 mi) beach that stretches all the way to Ca'n Picafort. In Alcúdia, the old town is well preserved with houses dating back to the 13th century. The old town is surrounded by a medieval wall.

== History ==
The area where Alcúdia is located has been inhabited since the Bronze Age, but it is with the arrival of the Romans that the city makes its entry into the history books. The Romans used the beaches of Alcúdia bay when they captured the island in 123 B.C. Shortly after this, the capital Palma de Mallorca was founded and then the city of Pollentia. From Pollentia, it was possible to view both the bay of Pollença and the bay of Alcúdia. Pollentia served as a guard against other invaders.

After Rome lost its position as the dominant power in the western Mediterranean, Pollentia was attacked by pirates and several times by the Vandals. Finally, the city was abandoned, and the remaining population left to create a new town at a more protected location. This town became Pollença and the area where Pollentia stood was left to ruins.

Alcúdia's name derives from al-kudja, Arabic for "on the hill"; referring to a Moorish farmstead created very close to where the ancient village of Pollentia had been. In 1229, the Moors were attacked by the King James I of Aragon, who occupied the area. In 1298, King James II of Aragon bought the farmstead Alcúdia and founded the new town. A church, a graveyard, a house for priests, and a square were created in the same year. The construction of the walls was also initiated at the same time and finished in 1362. The city plan that was made at the time remains the same for Alcúdia today. During the Renaissance, walls were reconstructed, and a second wall was constructed outside the first one. This wall has since been torn down and only details show where it once was.

During the 16th century, pirates attacked the city several times. The population shrank, and there was from time to time a risk that the city would be abandoned totally. In 1779, a decision was taken to support the city by constructing a harbour. This really improved the economy of Alcúdia and the village was saved. But it remained a rather small and poor village.

== Alcúdia today ==
In the 1920s, the first tourists began to visit Mallorca and also Alcúdia. This was in a very limited scale and the economy of the village stayed weak. In the early 1970s, it started to be clear that the future of Alcúdia would rely upon tourism. 15 years later, the old harbour of Puerto de Alcúdia had developed into a major resort for European tourism. In the 1990s, the construction boom calmed down and several regulations were put in place to secure the quality of the resort. The old town has been preserved and pedestrianised. It has now become one of the most visited villages in Mallorca.

The Port of Alcudia is a small port facility for handling primarily passenger ferries, but it also caters for bulk and breakbulk cargo and a dolphin berth for LPG carriers.

== Main sights ==
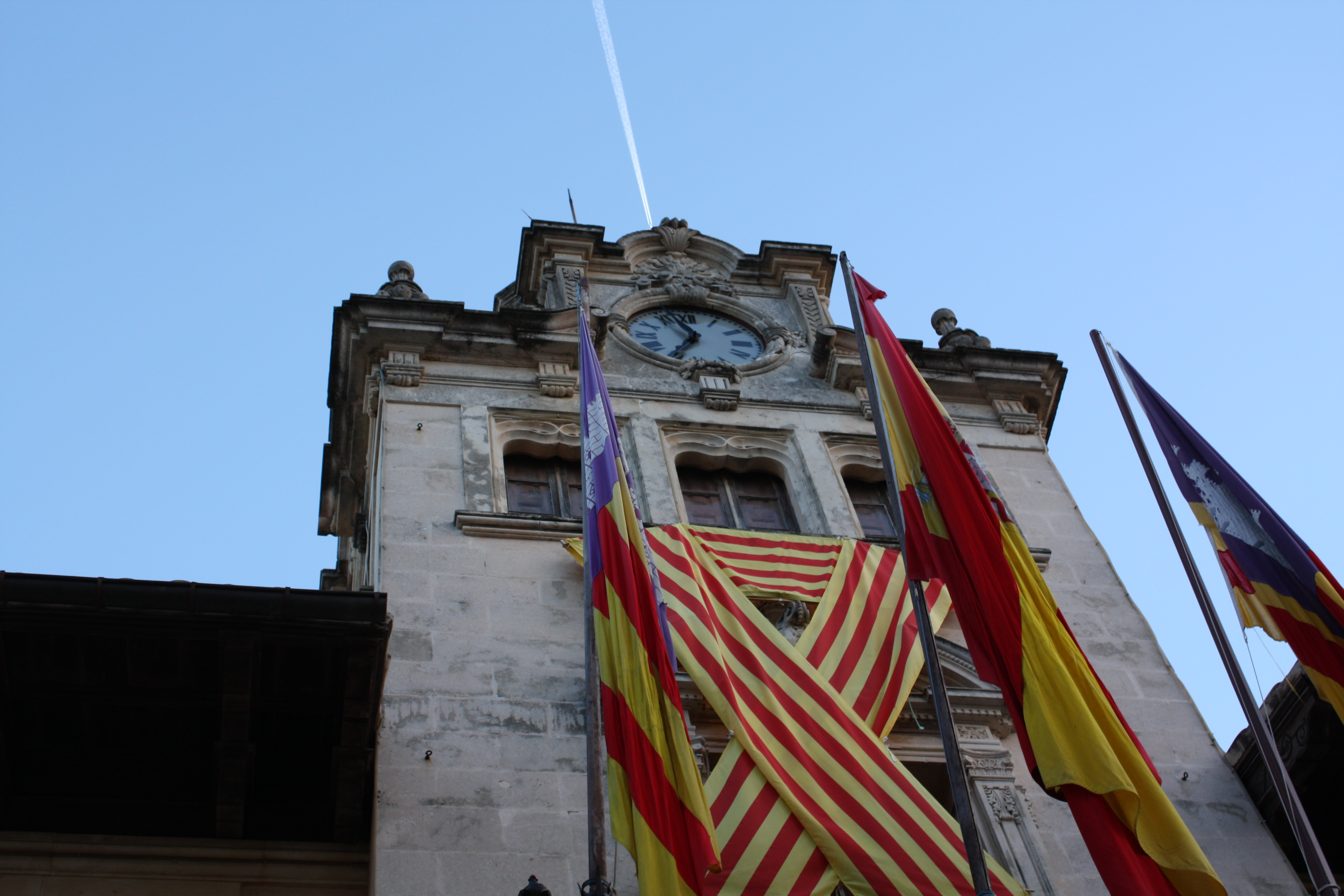
Town hall of Alcúdia located in the old town

The old town has a 14th-century wall and it is possible to step up on the wall and follow it almost all around the village. There are remains of a Roman town just outside the medieval town walls, in front of the Church of St. Jaume, belonging to the ancient city of Pollentia (see also the Italian Pollentia). There is also a small Roman theatre. North of the town is a bullring dating back to the 19th century.

The old town also hosts a market both on Sundays and Tuesdays all year round. Inside the walls, there are several restaurants and bistros. In Port d'Alcúdia, most of the restaurants are located around the marina. Most of these restaurants are only open in the tourist season. Further north and west are some coves and beaches ideal for sunbathing, swimming or snorkeling, like the one facing the islet of S'Illot. The beach at Alcúdia is c. 14 km (8.7 mi) long and stretches as far as Ca'n Picafort. Alcúdia joins onto Playa de Muro, which is home to S'Albufera; a natural park that is very popular with birders.

Alcúdia celebrates the festival of St. Jaume every summer. It goes on for nine days at the beginning of July. Before the festival starts, the town is decorated and each street picks out a theme for that year's look. During the festival, several traditional evening festivities are arranged in the old town, such as the Night of the Romans where the streets are full of locals dressed in traditional ancient Roman dresses. There are also outdoor theatres, sport tournaments, exhibitions and the traditional bullfight. The fiesta is finished with La Noche de Sant Jaume, a fireworks display and a philharmonic concert by the old walls.

Alcúdia also hosts many other fairs and festivals throughout the year. During the summer, there are al fresco events, with dramatised tours of the old town, and theatre productions in the old Roman amphitheatre. The Alcúdia Jazz Festival starts at the end of August and runs for a month. International sporting events are held down the road at the port, with an Ironman Triathlon twice a year, beach volleyball and beach rugby. There is an agricultural fair in the Autumn at the beginning of October and a nautical fair in April, which features the cuttlefish.

Taking place every three years is the Triennial of Sant Crist, a religious procession where the population walks barefoot through the town in silence, for several hours. The origin of this procession dates back to 1507. According to tradition, the image of Sant Crist sweated blood and water, thus putting an end to a drought.

Alcúdia is home to football club UD Alcúdia, which plays at Estadi Municipal Els Arcs, which has a capacity of 1,750.

== See also ==
- List of municipalities in Balearic Islands
