= Federico Flores =

Argentine footballer

Personal information
- Full name: Federico Jesús Flores
- Date of birth: 18 May 1992 (age 34)
- Place of birth: Rosario, Argentina
- Height: 1.75 m (5 ft 9 in)
- Position: Central midfielder

Team information
- Current team: Gualaceo

Youth career
- Rosario Central

Senior career*
Years	Team	Apps	(Gls)
2013–2016	Rosario Central	1	(0)
2015	→ Real Potosí (loan)	14	(3)
2016–2017	Arsenal de Sarandí	0	(0)
2017–2018	Sportivo Figherense		
2018–	Gualaceo	67	(3)
- * Club domestic league appearances and goals as of 19:26, 15 December 2020 (UTC)

Federico Jesús Flores (born 18 May 1992) is an Argentine professional footballer who plays as a central midfielder for Gualaceo.

== Career ==
Flores started in the youth teams of Rosario Central, he subsequently made his first-team debut on 16 June 2013 in a Primera B Nacional win over Deportivo Merlo as he was substituted on for the final five minutes. Rosario Central ended that season by winning promotion to the 2013–14 Argentine Primera División. Two years later, in June 2015, after making only one appearance for Rosario Central, Flores was loaned out to Bolivian Primera División side Real Potosí. His first match came on 9 August in a league defeat against Jorge Wilstermann. On 10 December, Flores scored a hat-trick in a 6–1 victory versus Oriente Petrolero.

Those were his only three goals in sixteen appearances in all competitions for the team. Upon returning to Rosario Central, he departed the club in 2016 to join fellow Argentine Primera División team Arsenal de Sarandí. His debut for Arsenal came in a Copa Argentina tie against Defensores de Belgrano on 12 August. After zero league appearances, he was released in July 2017. Following a spell with Sportivo Figherense, Flores signed for Ecuadorian Serie B side Gualaceo in February 2018.

== Career statistics ==
As of 15 December 2020.

Club statistics
Club	Season	League			Cup		Continental		Other		Total	
Club	Season	Division	Apps	Goals	Apps	Goals	Apps	Goals	Apps	Goals	Apps	Goals
Rosario Central	2012–13	Primera B Nacional	1	0	0	0	—		0	0	1	0
Rosario Central	2013–14	Argentine Primera División	0	0	0	0	0	0	0	0	0	0
Rosario Central	2014	Argentine Primera División	0	0	0	0	0	0	0	0	0	0
Rosario Central	2015	Argentine Primera División	0	0	0	0	—		0	0	0	0
Rosario Central	2016	Argentine Primera División	0	0	0	0	0	0	0	0	0	0
Rosario Central	Total		1	0	0	0	0	0	0	0	1	0
Real Potosí (loan)	2015–16	Bolivian Primera División	14	3	0	0	2 (Note: Appearance(s) in the Copa Sudamericana)	0	0	0	16	3
Arsenal de Sarandí	2016–17	Argentine Primera División	0	0	1	0	—		0	0	1	0
Gualaceo	2018	Serie B	31	3	—		—		0	0	31	3
Gualaceo	2019	Serie B	28	0	0	0	—		0	0	28	0
Gualaceo	2020	Serie B	8	0	0	0	—		0	0	8	0
Gualaceo	Total		67	3	0	0	—		0	0	67	3
Career total			82	6	1	0	2	0	0	0	85	6

== Honours ==
Rosario Central

- Primera B Nacional: 2012–13
