= Pollentia (Mallorca) =

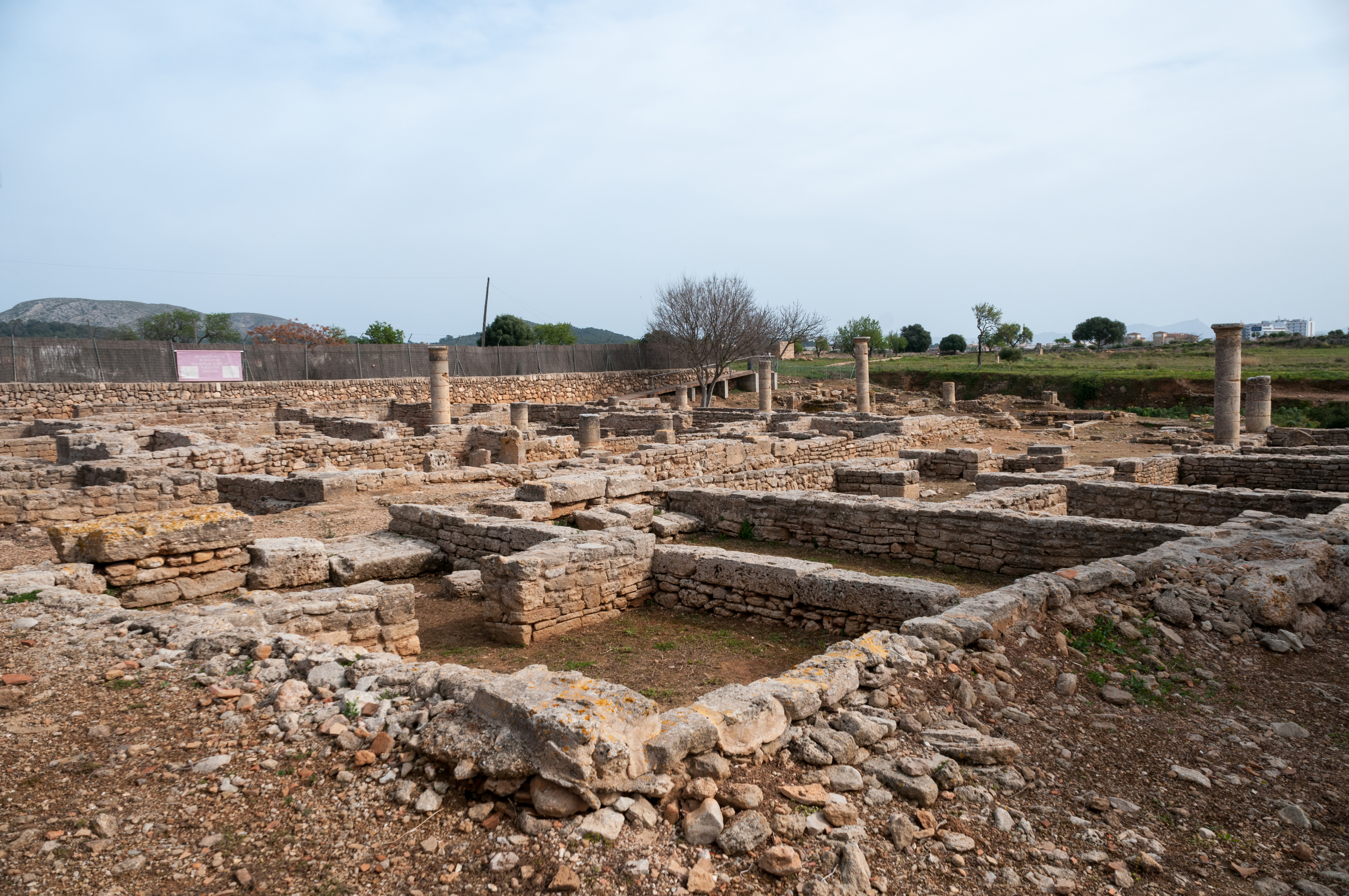
- "Sa Portella" residential area in Pollentia

- Location within Spain
- 39°51′0″N 03°07′20″E
- Type: Settlement
- Location: Alcúdia, Mallorca, Balearic Islands, Spain

History
- Built: 1st century BC

Site notes
- Excavation dates: 1923–present
- Discovered: 17th century

Pollentia (Catalan: Pol·lèntia) was a Roman city founded by Quintus Caecilius Metellus Balearicus in the present city of Alcúdia, allegedly in the year 123 BC.

The first documented remains belong, however, to the first half of the 1st century BC. This had led the researchers to establish the possibility of the creation of a castra (military camp) by the military expedition that, a generation later, would result in the current city of Pollentia.

== History ==
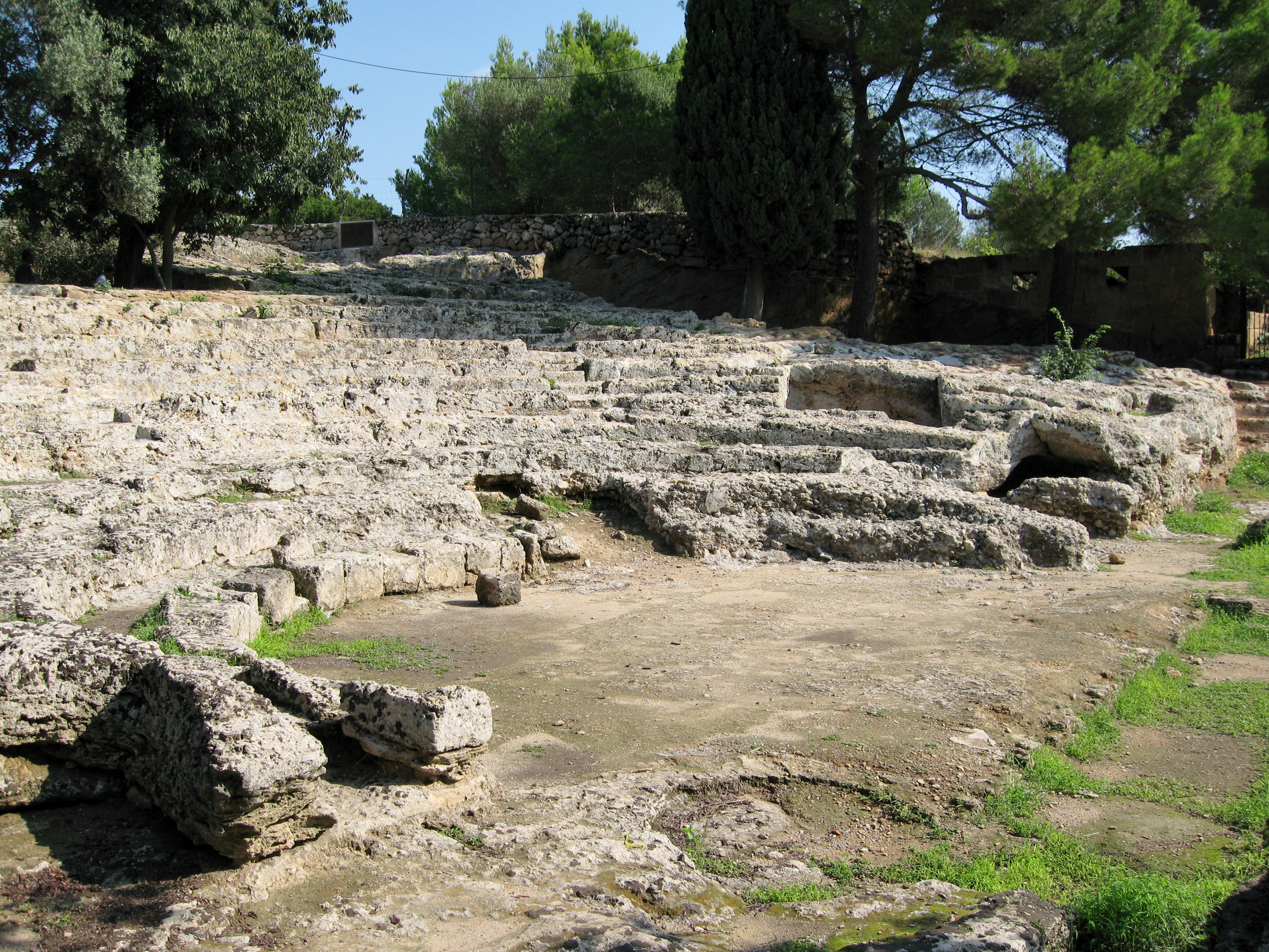
The ancient Roman theater

Like the other Roman cities founded by consul Metellus, it is believed Pollentia was a Roman castra (camp) until c. 70 BC, when, according to the excavations in the forum area, the urbanization of the city was reorganized and monumentalized. Pollentia was a rich and prosperous city, whose conserved area is around 16 hectares. This area suffered a devastating fire in the 3rd century AD, but the city was not depopulated, since the construction of a fortification in the 5th century AD has been documented in the same forum. In the following centuries, Pollentia was partially or totally unpopulated, with the Christian medieval population settling down a bit further north, in the present town of Alcúdia, which lies next to Pollença, the town that carries the name of this ancient Roman city. Excavations, since the 16th century, but especially since the beginning of the 20th century, have occurred mainly in the area of Sa Portella (a residential district), the city forum and the tabernae, and in the theater.

Opposite the site, within the town of Alcúdia, is the small, but extremely interesting Museo Monográfico de Pollentia. It contains finds from the excavations, including some of the many inscriptions that have been found. A guidebook, covering the site and the museum, was published in 2021.

The poet Miquel Costa i Llobera wrote a number of poems in which the Roman ruins of Pollentia are exalted, most notably in his renowned Ode to Horace as well as in Over the ruins of the Roman theater of Pollentia.
