= Joel Rodríguez (footballer) =

Spanish footballer (born 1998)

Personal information
- Full name: Joel Rodríguez Satorres
- Date of birth: 25 September 1998 (age 28)
- Place of birth: Algemesí, Spain
- Height: 1.78 m (5 ft 10 in)
- Position: Centre forward

Team information
- Current team: Terrassa
- Number: 16

Youth career
- –2015: Alzira
- 2015–2016: Silla
- 2016: Levante

Senior career*
Years	Team	Apps	(Gls)
2016–2019	Atlético Levante	59	(15)
2019–2020	Sanse	24	(4)
2020–2022	Osasuna B	54	(18)
2022	Inter Turku	11	(0)
2023	Alzira	16	(7)
2023–2024	Tudelano	28	(8)
2024–2025	Águilas	24	(5)
2025–	Terrassa	4	(0)

International career^{‡}
2017	Spain U19	1	(0)
- * Club domestic league appearances and goals as of 28 September 2025 ‡ National team caps and goals as of 1 December 2024

Joel Rodríguez Satorres (born 25 September 1998) is a Spanish professional footballer who plays as a centre forward for Terrassa in Segunda Federación.

== Club career ==
In mid-July 2022, Rodríguez moved abroad for the first time after signing with Inter Turku in Finnish Veikkausliiga. Unable to make an impact, he returned to Spain after making 11 appearances in the latter half of the 2022 season.

== Career statistics ==
As of 5 June 2025

Appearances and goals by club, season and competition
Club	Season	League			Cup (Note: Includes Copa del Rey and Suomen Cup)		Total	
Club	Season	Division	Apps	Goals	Apps	Goals	Apps	Goals
Alzira	2013–14	Tercera División	1	0	–		1	0
Atlético Levante	2016–17	Segunda División B	16	0	–		16	0
Atlético Levante	2017–18	Tercera División	33	13	–		33	13
Atlético Levante	2018–19	Segunda División B	10	2	–		10	2
Atlético Levante	Total		59	15	0	0	59	15
Sanse	2019–20	Segunda División B	24	4	2	0	26	4
Osasuna Promesas	2020–21	Segunda División B	22	5	–		22	5
Osasuna Promesas	2021–22	Segunda Federación	32	13	–		32	13
Osasuna Promesas	Total		54	18	0	0	54	18
Inter Turku	2022	Veikkausliiga	11	0	1	0	12	0
Alzira	2022–23	Segunda Federación	16	7	–		16	7
Tudelano	2023–24	Segunda Federación	28	8	2	1	30	9
Águilas	2024–25	Segunda Federación	24	5	0	0	24	5
Career total			217	57	5	1	222	58

== Honours ==
Inter Turku

- Finnish Cup runner-up: 2022
