= Cuba national under-15 football team =

National under-15 football team representing Cuba

Cuba U-15
- Nickname: Los Leones del Caribe (The Caribbean Lions)
- Association: Asociación de Fútbol de Cuba (AFC)
- Confederation: CONCACAF
- Head coach: Vacant / To be confirmed
- FIFA code: CUB
First colours	Second colours

First international
- Cuba 2–1 Manchester City youth (George Town, Cayman Islands; May 7, 2017)

Biggest win
- Cuba 5–2 Martinique (Bradenton, United States; August 15, 2017)

Biggest defeat
- Cuba 0–10 United States (Santo Domingo, Dominican Republic; August 7, 2023)

CONCACAF Under-15 Championship
- Appearances: 3 (first in 2017)
- Best result: League A (2023)

FIFA U-15 World Cup & Festival
- Appearances: 1 (first in 2026)
- Best result: Debut (ongoing)

The Cuba national under-15 football team represents Cuba in tournaments and friendly matches at the Under-15 level. It is controlled by the Asociación de Fútbol de Cuba (AFC) and is affiliated with CONCACAF. The team has participated in the FIFA U-15 World Cup & Festival and the CONCACAF Boys' Under-15 Championship.

== History ==
The Cuban U-15 team has historically participated in invitational tournaments in the Caribbean. In May 2017, the team won the Cayman Airways International Youth Football Cup, defeating a Manchester City youth affiliate 2-1 in the final. Player York Alejandro González was the tournament's top scorer and MVP.

In August 2017, Cuba participated in the 2017 CONCACAF Boys' Under-15 Championship in Bradenton, Florida, competing in Division 2, Group C. The team finished second in their group with a record of two wins and one loss, advancing to the 5th to 8th place playoffs. In the playoff match against the Dominican Republic, the match ended 0-0 and Cuba won 4-3 on penalties to secure 5th place in Division 2.

In August 2023, Cuba competed in League A of the 2023 CONCACAF Boys' Under-15 Championship in the Dominican Republic. Drawn into Group B alongside the United States, Haiti, and guest team Qatar, Cuba finished third with one win and two losses. Their campaign included a 1-3 defeat to Haiti, a 0-10 loss to the United States, and a 1-0 victory over Qatar. As a result, Cuba advanced to the play-offs round, where they were eliminated 0-3 by El Salvador.

In 2025, Cuba participated in the 2025 CONCACAF Boys' Under-15 Championship in Aruba. Placed in Group C of League B, they opened with a 2-1 victory over the Cayman Islands, then suffered a 1-4 defeat against Puerto Rico, and closed the group stage with a 1-2 loss to Guyana.

In 2026, Cuba made its debut in the inaugural FIFA U-15 World Cup & Festival in Baku, Azerbaijan. The team was drawn into Group AB alongside the Czech Republic, Jamaica, Sri Lanka, Togo, and the U.S. Virgin Islands. On October 24, 2026, Cuba won their opening match against Togo 1-0, with a goal from Erik David Grotestan.

== Competitive record ==
=== FIFA U-15 World Cup & Festival ===
FIFA U-15 World Cup & Festival record
Year	Round	Position	Pld	W	D*	L	GF	GA
(Azerbaijan) 2026	Group stage (ongoing)	—	1	1	0	0	1	0
Total		1/1	1	1	0	0	1	0

=== CONCACAF Under-15 Championship ===
CONCACAF Under-15 Championship
Year	League	Round	Position	Pld	W	D*	L	GF	GA
(Cayman Islands) 2013	did not enter								
(United States) 2017	Division 2	Group stage / 5th–8th playoff	5th	4	2	1	1	8	6
(United States) 2019	did not enter								
(Costa Rica) 2021	Cancelled due to COVID-19 pandemic								
(Dominican Republic) 2023	League A	Group stage / Play-offs	—	4	1	0	3	2	17
(Costa Rica) 2025	League B	Group stage	—	3	1	0	2	4	7
Total				11	4	1	6	14	30

== Results and schedule ==
The following is a list of match results in the last 12 months, as well as any future matches that have been scheduled.

Legend

Win Draw Lose Fixture

=== 2017 ===
August 14, 2017 CONCACAF U-15 Championship; Group C	Cuba	1–3	El Salvador	Bradenton, United States
09:00				Stadium: IMG Academy

August 15, 2017 CONCACAF U-15 Championship; Group C	Martinique	2–5	Cuba	Bradenton, United States
11:00				Stadium: IMG Academy

August 17, 2017 CONCACAF U-15 Championship; Group C	Bermuda	1–2	Cuba	Bradenton, United States
09:00				Stadium: IMG Academy

August 19, 2017 CONCACAF U-15 Championship; 5th–8th place	Cuba	0–0 (4–3 p)	Dominican Republic	Bradenton, United States
11:00				Stadium: IMG Academy
	Penalties
	4		3

=== 2023 ===
August 6, 2023 CONCACAF U-15 Championship; League A Group B	Haiti	3–1	Cuba	Santo Domingo, Dominican Republic
18:00				Stadium: Estadio Panamericano

August 7, 2023 CONCACAF U-15 Championship; League A Group B	Cuba	0–10	United States	Santo Domingo, Dominican Republic
18:00				Stadium: Estadio Panamericano

August 8, 2023 CONCACAF U-15 Championship; League A Group B	Cuba	1–0	Qatar	Santo Domingo, Dominican Republic
18:00				Stadium: Estadio Panamericano

August 10, 2023 CONCACAF U-15 Championship; Play-offs	El Salvador	3–0	Cuba	Santo Domingo, Dominican Republic
14:00				Stadium: Estadio Panamericano

=== 2025 ===
August 2025 CONCACAF U-15 Championship; League B Group C	Cuba	2–1	Cayman Islands	Oranjestad, Aruba

August 2025 CONCACAF U-15 Championship; League B Group C	Puerto Rico	4–1	Cuba	Oranjestad, Aruba

August 6, 2025 CONCACAF U-15 Championship; League B Group C	Cuba	1–2	Guyana	Oranjestad, Aruba
				Stadium: Stadion CD Guillermo Trinidad

=== 2026 ===
October 24, 2026 FIFA U-15 World Cup	Cuba	1–0	Togo	Baku, Azerbaijan
	Grotestan			Stadium: Hovsan Sport Complex

== Head-to-head record ==
The following table summarizes Cuba's results against each opponent in the matches listed above, ordered by wins, then draws, then losses. The 2017 match against the Dominican Republic ended 0–0 and Cuba won on penalties, but it is recorded as a draw for statistical purposes.

Opponent	Pld	W	D	L	GF	GA	GD
Martinique	1	1	0	0	5	2	+3
Bermuda	1	1	0	0	2	1	+1
Cayman Islands	1	1	0	0	2	1	+1
Qatar	1	1	0	0	1	0	+1
Togo	1	1	0	0	1	0	+1
Dominican Republic	1	0	1	0	0	0	0
Guyana	1	0	0	1	1	2	−1
Haiti	1	0	0	1	1	3	−2
Puerto Rico	1	0	0	1	1	4	−3
El Salvador	2	0	0	2	1	6	−5
United States	1	0	0	1	0	10	−10
Total	12	5	1	6	15	29	−14

== Honours ==
- Cayman Airways International Youth Football Cup
  - Winners (1): 2017

== See also ==
- Cuba national football team
- Cuba national under-20 football team
- Cuba national under-17 football team
- Cuba women's national football team
