= Robert Oliveras =

Mexican footballer (born 2010)

Personal information
- Full name: Robert Oliveras Aceves
- Date of birth: 23 November 2010 (age 15)
- Place of birth: Barcelona, Spain
- Height: 1.82 m (6 ft 0 in)
- Position: Midfielder

Team information
- Current team: Barcelona

Youth career
- Sant Gabriel
- –2024: Damm
- 2024–: Barcelona

International career^{‡}
Years	Team	Apps	(Gls)
2024–2025	Mexico U15	10	(1)
2026–	Mexico U16	1	(0)
- ‡ National team caps and goals as of 31 March 2026

Robert Oliveras Aceves (born 23 November 2010) is a footballer who plays as a midfielder for Barcelona. Born in Spain, he is a Mexico youth international.

== Early life ==
Oliveras was born on 23 November 2010 in Barcelona, Spain and grew up in El Clot neighborhood, Barcelona.

Born to a Mexican mother and a Spanish father, he obtained Mexican citizenship and Spanish citizenship.

== Club career ==
As a youth player, Oliveras joined the youth academy of Spanish side Sant Gabriel. Following his stint there, he joined the youth academy of Spanish side Damm, where he played as a midfielder in the club's 4–2–3–1 formation.

Ahead of the 2024–25 season, he joined the youth academy of Spanish La Liga side Barcelona, helping the club's under-16 team win the 2026 Alkass International Cup.

== International career ==
Oliveras is a Mexico youth international and has represented the country internationally at under-15 and under-16 levels and is eligible to represent Spain internationally. Argentine manager Andrés Lillini, the director of Mexico's youth national teams at the time, discovered his eligibility to represent Mexico internationally through a friend and contacted his parents to convince him to represent Mexico internationally.

On 26 November 2024, he debuted for the Mexico national under-15 football team during a 0–4 away friendly loss to the Spain national under-15 football team. During the summer of 2025, he played for the Mexico national under-15 football team at the 2025 CONCACAF Boys' Under-15 Championship, helping the team win the competition. On 30 March 2026, he debuted for the Mexico national under-16 football team during a 0–1 away friendly loss to the Portugal national under-16 football team.

== Style of play ==
Oliveras plays as a midfielder. Right-footed, he has played as a defender while playing for the youth academy of Spanish La Liga side Barcelona.

Argentine news website Infobae wrote in that "technical reports highlight his versatility on the pitch, as he performs both offensive and defensive duties with ease. His speed and physical presence are attributes that have allowed him to excel among his peers and adapt to different positions".
