= Paxon Ruffin =

American soccer player (born 2007)

Personal information
- Full name: Paxon Levi Ruffin Tamez
- Date of birth: January 28, 2010 (age 16)
- Place of birth: Florida, U.S.
- Height: 1.74 m (5 ft 9 in)
- Positions: Midfielder; winger

Team information
- Current team: Rayados De Monterrey
- Number: 244

Youth career
- Florida Elite Soccer Academy
- VVV-Venlo
- Silva Academy
- Monterrey

Senior career*
Years	Team	Apps	(Gls)
2026–	Monterrey	1	(0)

International career^{‡}
2025	Mexico U15	6	(3)
2026	Mexico U16	4	(0)
2026–	United States U17	3	(0)
- * Club domestic league appearances and goals ‡ National team caps and goals as of 3 October 2026

Paxon Levi Ruffin Tamez (born 28 January 2010) is a professional soccer player who plays as a midfielder for Monterrey. Born in the United States, he has represented Mexico and the United States internationally at youth level.

== Early life ==
Ruffin was born on 28 January 2010. Born in Florida, United States, he is the son of a Mexican mother and an American father.

== Club career ==
As a youth player, Ruffin joined the youth academy of American side Florida Elite Soccer Academy. Following his stint here, he joined the youth academy of VVV-Venlo in the Netherlands.

Subsequently, he joined the youth academy of American outfit Silva Academy. Afterwards, he joined the youth academy of Monterrey in Mexico, helping the club's under-15 team win the league title. On 18 October 2026, he debuted for their senior team during a 2–1 home win over Pachuca in the league.

== International career ==
Ruffin is a Mexico and United States youth international and has represented the former internationally at under-15 and under-16 level and the latter internationally at under-17 level.

Ruffin played for the Mexico national under-15 football team at the 2025 CONCACAF Boys' Under-15 Championship, helping the team win the competition. Altogether, he made four appearances for the Mexico national under-16 football team.

== Style of play ==
Ruffin plays as a midfielder. Mexican website Futbol Total wrote in 2026 that "he plays as a creative midfielder, although he can also play as a winger on either side. He stands out for his excellent ball control and ability to take on and beat opponents".
