= Juan Carlos Ortega =

Mexican footballer (born 1967)

Personal information
- Full name: Juan Carlos Ortega Orozco
- Date of birth: 19 March 1967 (age 59)
- Place of birth: Atotonilco el Alto, Jalisco, Mexico
- Height: 1.78 m (5 ft 10 in)
- Position: Defender

Senior career*
Years	Team	Apps	(Gls)
1988–1993	UdeG		
1993–1996	Tigres UANL		
1996	León		
1996–1999	Tigres UANL		
1999–2000	UAT		
2000–2003	Tapatío		

Managerial career
- 2003–2009: Guadalajara (Assistant)
- 2013: Guadalajara
- 2014: Guadalajara (Assistant)
- 2015–2019: Mexico U15
- 2026: Querétaro (assistant)
- * Club domestic league appearances and goals

Juan Carlos Ortega Orozco (Note: In this Spanish name, the first or paternal surname is Ortega and the second or maternal family name is Orozco.) (born 19 March 1967) is a Mexican former footballer who is Director of Methodology and Development for Major League Soccer club LA Galaxy, where he oversees the club's youth academy and development.

== Honours ==
=== Manager ===
Mexico U15

- CONCACAF Under-15 Championship: 2017
