= Mexico national under-16 football team =

National association football team

Mexico U-16
- Nickname(s): El Tri (The Tri); El Tricolor (The Tricolor); Los Niños Héroes (The Hero Boys)
- Association: Mexican Football Federation (Federación Mexicana de Fútbol)
- Confederation: CONCACAF
- Head coach: Yasser Corona
- FIFA code: MEX
First colours	Second colours

The Mexico national U-16 football team represents Mexico in tournaments and friendly matches at the Under-16 level. They are administered by the Mexican Football Federation.

== Recent results and fixtures ==
The following is a list of match results in the last 12 months, as well as any future matches that have been scheduled.

Win Draw Loss Fixture

=== 2025 ===
November 26 Torneo 4 Naciones	Mexico	0–0 (3–4 p)	Dominican Republic	Cuautlancingo, Mexico
		Report		Stadium: Unidad Deportiva San Juan Cuautlancingo

November 27 Torneo 4 Naciones	Mexico	4–1	Costa Rica	Cuautlancingo, Mexico
	Chávez 53' (pen.); Dimareli 68'; Cisneros 84'; Kimbrough 85'	Report	Barley 35' (pen.)	Stadium: Unidad Deportiva San Juan Cuautlancingo

November 28 Torneo 4 Naciones	Mexico	3–2	Canada	Cuautlancingo, Mexico
	Kimbrough 20', 25'; Cisneros 82'	Report	Torres 70'; Delgado 78'	Stadium: Unidad Deportiva San Juan Cuautlancingo

=== 2026 ===
March 31 2026 Montaigu Tournament Group B	Mexico	0–1	Portugal	Montaigu, France
		Report

April 2 2026 Montaigu Tournament Group B	Mexico	2–0	Peru	Montaigu, France
	Muñoz x2	Report

April 4 2026 Montaigu Tournament Group B	Mexico	3–3	Japan	Montaigu, France
	Torres; Da’vian Kimbrough; Martínez	Report

April 6 2026 Montaigu Tournament 3rd Place Match	Ivory Coast	2–0	Mexico	Montaigu, France
		Report

April 16 2026 Vertex Cup	Argentina	2–3	Mexico	Miami, United States
	Cabral 16', 25'	Report	Silva 44'; Martínez 55'; Gómez 80'	Stadium: Beyond Bancard Field

April 19 2026 Vertex Cup	United States	2–1	Mexico	Miami, United States
	Lucero 75'; Muvvera 86'	Report	Torres 45+2'	Stadium: Beyond Bancard Field

April 22 2026 Vertex Cup	Mexico	1–5	England	Miami, United States
	Gómez 6'	Report	Motsi 17'; Otabor 37'; Joseph 51'; Bernard 79'; Kilwa 83'	Stadium: Beyond Bancard Field

September 3 Friendly Tournament	Mexico	0–0	(United States) LA Galaxy Academy	Toluca, Mexico
		Report		Stadium: Centro de Alto Rendimiento

September 4 Friendly Tournament	Mexico	1–0	(Mexico) C.F. Monterrey Academy	Toluca, Mexico
	Flowers 53'	Report		Stadium: Centro de Alto Rendimiento

September 5 Friendly Tournament	Mexico	1–0	(Chile) Universidad Católica Academy	Toluca, Mexico
	Torres 70+2'	Report		Stadium: Centro de Alto Rendimiento

September 7 Friendly Tournament	Mexico	1–3	(United States) Seattle Sounders Academy	Toluca, Mexico
	Alverde 13'	Report		Stadium: Centro de Alto Rendimiento

September 8 Friendly Tournament	Mexico	1–2	(Mexico) C.F. Pachuca Academy	Toluca, Mexico
	Silva	Report	Pérez; Vázquez	Stadium: Centro de Alto Rendimiento

September 9 Friendly Tournament	Mexico	0–2	(Mexico) Toluca Academy	Toluca, Mexico
		Report		Stadium: Centro de Alto Rendimiento

September 11 Friendly Tournament	Mexico	2–1	(Mexico) Atlas FC Academy	Toluca, Mexico
	Carmona 21'; Flowers 62'	Report	Del Real 42'	Stadium: Centro de Alto Rendimiento

== Players ==
=== Current squad ===
20 players were called up for the September friendlies.

Caps and goals updated as of match on October 7, 2026

No.	Pos.	Player	Date of birth (age)	Caps	Goals	Club
	GK	David Bernal	April 16, 2010 (age 16)	2	0	(Mexican Football Federation) Club América Academy
	GK	Jonathan Sánchez	(16)	0	0	(Mexican Football Federation) Club Necaxa Academy
	DF	Juan Garza	January 20, 2010 (age 16)	2	0	(Mexican Football Federation) C.F. Monterrey Academy
	DF	Christian Guillén-Lopez	January 16, 2010 (age 16)	2	0	(United States Soccer Federation) FC Dallas Academy
	DF	Giovani García	June 27, 2010 (age 16)	1	0	(Mexican Football Federation) Pumas UNAM Academy
	DF	Rubén Blanco	January 15, 2010 (age 16)	0	0	(Mexican Football Federation) Club Tijuana Academy
	DF	Anxo Peleteiro	January 1, 2010 (age 16)	0	0	(Royal Spanish Football Federation) Celta Academy
	DF	Octavio Santillana	(16)	0	0	(Norwegian Football Federation) Viking FK Academy
	DF	Sebastián Silva	April 22, 2010 (age 16)	0	0	(Mexican Football Federation) Club América Academy
	MF	Lisandro Torres	April 21, 2010 (age 16)	4	1	(United States Soccer Federation) Los Angeles FC 2
	MF	Jorge Salmerón	(16)	4	0	(United States Soccer Federation) Columbus Crew Academy
	MF	Erick Galindez	January 27, 2010 (age 16)	3	0	(Mexican Football Federation) C.D. Guadalajara Academy
	MF	Dylan Reyes	March 4, 2010 (age 16)	3	0	(United States Soccer Federation) Houston Dynamo Academy
	MF	Dilan Padilla	(16)	0	0	(Mexican Football Federation) C.D. Guadalajara Academy
	MF	César Quintana	(16)	0	0	(Mexican Football Federation) C.D. Guadalajara Academy
	MF	Atakan Yilmaz	January 10, 2010 (age 16)	0	0	(German Football Association) FC St. Pauli II
	FW	Paxon Ruffin	January 28, 2010 (age 16)	4	0	(Mexican Football Federation) C.F. Monterrey Academy
	FW	Félix Gómez	August 18, 2010 (age 16)	3	2	(United States Soccer Federation) Los Angeles FC 2
	FW	Benji Flowers	April 14, 2011 (age 15)	2	2	(United States Soccer Federation) FC Dallas
	FW	Daniel Carmona	(16)	1	1	(United States Soccer Federation) Real Salt Lake Academy
	FW	Diego Alverde	January 10, 2010 (age 16)	0	0	(Mexican Football Federation) Club América Academy
	FW	Zamir Loyo	January 20, 2011 (age 15)	0	0	(United States Soccer Federation) Sporting Kansas City II

=== Recent call-ups ===
The following players have been called up in the past 12 months.

Pos.	Player	Date of birth (age)	Caps	Goals	Club	Latest call-up
GK	José Corona	May 8, 2010 (age 16)	4	0	(Mexico) Club Tijuana Academy	2026 Vertex Cup
DF	Emilio Jasso	February 11, 2010 (age 16)	4	0	(Mexico) Toluca Academy	2026 Vertex Cup
DF	Gael Aguilar	December 14, 2010 (age 15)	3	0	(Mexico) C.D. Guadalajara Academy	2026 Vertex Cup
DF	Mauricio Aguilar	March 20, 2010 (age 16)	3	0	(Mexico) Venados	2026 Vertex Cup
DF	Gabriel Frías	July 22, 2010 (age 16)	3	0	(Mexico) Tigres UANL Academy	2026 Vertex Cup
DF	Aric Mata	(16)	3	0	(United States) Portland Timbers 2	2026 Vertex Cup
DF	Erick Ruiz	February 23, 2010 (age 16)	3	0	(Mexico) C.D. Guadalajara Academy	2026 Vertex Cup
DF	Manuel Vega	February 2, 2010 (age 16)	2	0	(Mexico) C.D. Guadalajara Academy	2026 Vertex Cup
DF	Román Avakian Gómez	July 6, 2010 (age 16)	1	0	(Germany) Mainz 05 Academy	2026 Montaigu Tournament
DF	Leonardo Soto	July 9, 2010 (age 16)	0	0	(Mexico) Cruz Azul Academy	2026 Montaigu Tournament
MF	Juan Carlos Martínez	March 12, 2010 (age 16)	4	1	(Mexico) Querétaro	2026 Vertex Cup
MF	Lucas Silva	November 8, 2010 (age 15)	3	1	(Mexico) Toluca Academy	2026 Vertex Cup
MF	Jayden González	February 10, 2011 (age 15)	2	0	(Mexico) Club América Academy	2026 Vertex Cup
MF	Joshua López	March 29, 2010 (age 16)	0	0	(Mexico) C.F. Pachuca Academy	2026 Montaigu Tournament
MF	Róbert Oliveras	November 23, 2010 (age 15)	0	0	(Spain) FC Barcelona Academy	2026 Montaigu Tournament
MF	Joaquín Reyes	May 19, 2010 (age 16)	0	0	(Mexico) Pumas UNAM Academy	2026 Montaigu Tournament
FW	Fernando Ruíz	April 14, 2010 (age 16)	2	0	(Mexico) Toluca Academy	2026 Vertex Cup
FW	Da'vian Kimbrough	February 18, 2010 (age 16)	8	3	(United States) North Texas SC	2026 Montaigu Tournament
FW	Alex Hernandez	February 1, 2010 (age 16)	2	0	(United States) Colorado Rapids Academy	2026 Montaigu Tournament
FW	Matthew Arana	August 28, 2010 (age 16)	1	0	(United States) Houston Dynamo FC	2026 Montaigu Tournament
FW	Emiliano Muñoz	January 11, 2010 (age 16)	1	0	(Spain) Atlético Madrid Academy	2026 Montaigu Tournament

- PRE - Withdrawn prior to competition
- INJ - Withdrawn for injury

== Competitive record ==
=== FIFA U-17 World Cup record ===
Year	Round	GP	W	D*	L	GS	GA
(China) 1985	Group stage	3	1	1	1	3	3
(Canada) 1987	Group stage	3	1	1	1	3	9
(Scotland) 1989	Did not enter						
Total	0/3	0	0	0	0	0	0

== Honours ==
- Montaigu Tournament
  - Winners (1): 1988
