= Mono Martínez =

Mexican footballer (born 2010)

Personal information
- Full name: Juan Carlos Martínez Jr.
- Date of birth: March 12, 2010 (age 16)
- Place of birth: Los Angeles County, United States
- Height: 1.74 m (5 ft 9 in)
- Position: Midfielder

Team information
- Current team: Querétaro
- Number: 30

Youth career
- –2026: LA Galaxy

Senior career*
Years	Team	Apps	(Gls)
2026–	Querétaro	6	(0)

International career^{‡}
2024–2025	Mexico U15	13	(10)
2026–	Mexico U16	4	(1)
- * Club domestic league appearances and goals as of 25 October 2026 ‡ National team caps and goals as of 22 April 2026

Juan Carlos Martínez Jr. (born 28 January 2010) is a professional footballer who plays as a midfielder for Liga MX club Querétaro. Born in the United States, he is a Mexico youth international.

== Club career ==
As a youth player, Martínez joined the youth academy of American side LA Galaxy, where he received interest from the youth academies of European outfits.

Following his stint here, he signed for Querétaro in Mexico ahead of the 2026–27 season, where he wore the number thirty jersey. On 18 July 2026, he debuted for them during a 0–1 home loss to América in the league.

== International career ==
Martínez is a Mexico youth international and has represented the country internationally at under-15 and under-16 level and is eligible to represent the United States internationally, having been born in the country.

During the summer of 2025, he played for the Mexico national under-15 football team at the 2025 CONCACAF Boys' Under-15 Championship, helping the team win the competition. Altogether, he made thirteen appearances and scored ten goals while playing for the Mexico national under-15 football team.

== Career statistics ==
=== Club ===
As of 25 October 2026

Appearances and goals by club, season and competition
Club	Season	League			Cup		Continental		Other		Total	
Club	Season	Division	Apps	Goals	Apps	Goals	Apps	Goals	Apps	Goals	Apps	Goals
Querétaro	2026–27	Liga MX	6	0	—		—		3 (Note: Appearances in Leagues Cup)	0	9	0
Career total			6	0	0	0	0	0	3	0	9	0

== Style of play ==
Martínez plays as a midfielder. Mexican news website wrote in 2026 that "his versatility is one of the main attractions... as he can play as an attacking midfielder, winger, or striker, thus expanding the tactical options available".

== Personal life ==
Martínez was born on 28 January 2010. Born in Los Angeles County, United States, he was born to a father from Michoacán, Mexico and a mother from Tijuana, Mexico. As a player, he has been represented by football agency StayPro.
