= 2023 CONCACAF Boys' Under-15 Championship =

Campeonato de Niños Sub-15 CONCACAF 2023

Tournament details
- Host country: Dominican Republic; Curaçao
- Cities: Santo Domingo; Willemstad
- Dates: 6–13 August
- Teams: 42 (from 2 confederations)
- Venues: 2 (in 2 host cities)

Final positions
- Champions: United States (1st title)
- Runners-up: Mexico
- Third place: Haiti
- Fourth place: Jamaica

The 2023 CONCACAF Boys' Under-15 Championship (Spanish: Campeonato de Niños Sub-15 CONCACAF 2023) is the fourth edition of the CONCACAF Boys' Under-15 Championship, the biennial international youth football tournament organized by CONCACAF for the men's under-15 national teams of North, Central America and Caribbean. It was held in the Dominican Republic and Curaçao from 6 to 13 August 2023.

The CONCACAF Boys' Under-15 Championship returned after 4 years due to the COVID-19 pandemic forced CONCACAF to cancel the tournament in 2021.

The United States won its first championship, after defeating Mexico 4–2 in final.

== Teams ==
A total of 41 teams entered the tournament, 39 out of the 41 CONCACAF member national teams and two invited teams from the Asian Football Confederation (AFC), Qatar and Saudi Arabia. Montserrat was scheduled to participate in League C but finally withdrew. Bahamas did not enter the tournament.

Like previous editions, the teams were split into three divisions, named League A (with 16 teams), League B (with 16 teams) and League C (with 9 teams), according to the CONCACAF Men's Under-17 Ranking as of February 2023, with the two invited teams being included within League A.

League A (16 teams)
Rank	Team	Prv	Pts
1	Mexico		6,943
2	United States		5,547
3	Canada		3,597
4	Honduras		3,444
5	Costa Rica		3,252
6	Panama		3,247
7	Haiti		2,537
8	Jamaica		1,931
9	El Salvador		1,846
10	Cuba		1,510
11	Guatemala		1,410
12	Puerto Rico	▲	1,326
13	Trinidad and Tobago		1,326
15	Dominican Republic	▲	1,121
N/R	Qatar (invited from AFC)	—	—
N/R	Saudi Arabia (invited from AFC)	—	—

League B (16 teams)
Rank	Team	Prv	Pts
14	Nicaragua		1,212
16	Guadeloupe	▼	1,090
17	Bermuda		1,090
18	Curaçao	▼	931
19	Bonaire	▲	863
20	Aruba		850
21	Guyana		839
22	Suriname	▼	832
23	Martinique		729
24	Barbados	▼	710
26	Cayman Islands		637
27	Antigua and Barbuda		628
28	Saint Kitts and Nevis		613
29	Belize		437
30	Saint Lucia		397
31	Grenada		388

League C (9 teams)
Rank	Team	Prv	Pts
33	British Virgin Islands		356
33	Saint Vincent and the Grenadines	▼	323
34	Anguilla		318
35	Saint Martin		292
36	U.S. Virgin Islands		227
37	Dominica		213
38	Turks and Caicos Islands		87
39	French Guiana	▼	0
40	Montserrat		0
41	Sint Maarten		0

The groups and match schedule were unveiled on 31 July 2023.

League A

Group A
Pos	Team
A1	Mexico
A2	Jamaica
A3	El Salvador
A4	Saudi Arabia

Group B
Pos	Team
B1	United States
B2	Haiti
B3	Cuba
B4	Qatar

Group C
Pos	Team
C1	Canada
C2	Panama
C3	Guatemala
C4	Dominican Republic

Group D
Pos	Team
D1	Honduras
D2	Costa Rica
D3	Puerto Rico
D4	Trinidad and Tobago

League B

Group E
Pos	Team
E1	Nicaragua
E2	Suriname
E3	Martinique
E4	Grenada

Group F
Pos	Team
F1	Guadeloupe
F2	Guyana
F3	Barbados
F4	Saint Lucia

Group G
Pos	Team
G1	Bermuda
G2	Aruba
G3	Cayman Islands
G4	Belize

Group H
Pos	Team
H1	Curaçao
H2	Bonaire
H3	Antigua and Barbuda
H4	Saint Kitts and Nevis

League C

Group I
Pos	Team
I1	British Virgin Islands
I2	Dominica
I3	Turks and Caicos Islands

Group J
Pos	Team
J1	Sint Maarten
J2	Saint Vincent and the Grenadines
J3	U.S. Virgin Islands

Group K
Pos	Team
K1	French Guiana
K2	Anguilla
K3	Saint Martin

== Format ==
In League A, the 16 teams were divided into four groups (A to D) of four, with each group played on a single round-robin basis. The top two teams of each group advanced to the quarter-finals, where the winners advance to the semi-finals, the winners of the semi-finals played the final while the losers played the third place match. The eight teams that not advanced to the quarter-finals were paired, based on their results in the group stage, to play in a final play-offs round.

In League 2, the 16 teams are also divided into four groups (E to H) of four and the same competition format as in League A was used.

In Division 3, the 9 teams are divided into three groups (I to K) one of three and the same competition format as in League A and B was used, with the difference that only the winners of each group and the best runner-up advanced directly to the semi-finals.

Each match was to last 70 minutes, comprising two periods of 35 minutes with an interval of 10 minutes in between. If a game in quarter-finals, semi-finals or third place match of each league was tied at the end of regulation time, the winner would be decided directly by a penalty shoot-out. If the final match of each league was tied at the end of regulation time an extra time of two 10 minute periods would be played, if the score was still tied at the end of overtime, the match would be decided by a penalty shoot-out.

== League A ==
All match times are in DOT (UTC−4), as listed by CONCACAF.

=== Group stage ===
==== Group A ====
Pos	Team	Pld	W	D	L	GF	GA	GD	Pts	Qualification
1	Mexico	3	3	0	0	11	2	+9	9	Advance to Quarter-finals
2	Jamaica	3	2	0	1	6	3	+3	6	Advance to Quarter-finals
3	El Salvador	3	1	0	2	5	6	−1	3	Advance to Play-offs round
4	Saudi Arabia (G)	3	0	0	3	2	13	−11	0	Advance to Play-offs round

Source: CONCACAF
Rules for classification: Tiebreakers
(G) Guests
6 August 2023
14:00

Jamaica	1–0	El Salvador
28'

Estadio Panamericano, Santo Domingo
6 August 2023
16:00

Mexico	5–0	Saudi Arabia
H. Mancilla 2'; G. Mora 9', 17'; M. Reyes 61'; J. Rangel 66'

Estadio Panamericano, Santo Domingo

7 August 2023
14:00

El Salvador	1–4	Mexico
Germán Argueta 46'		H. Mancilla 14', 53'; G. García 71'; G. Mora 73'

Estadio Panamericano, Santo Domingo
7 August 2023
16:00

Saudi Arabia	1–4	Jamaica

Estadio Panamericano, Santo Domingo

8 August 2023
14:00

El Salvador	4–1	Saudi Arabia
Germán Argueta 2', 34'; Kerim Torres 30', 36'		16'

Estadio Panamericano, Santo Domingo
8 August 2023
16:00

Mexico	2–1	Jamaica
D. Armenta 63'; L. Gamboa 73'

Estadio Panamericano, Santo Domingo

==== Group B ====
Pos	Team	Pld	W	D	L	GF	GA	GD	Pts	Qualification
1	United States	3	3	0	0	17	2	+15	9	Advance to Quarter-finals
2	Haiti	3	2	0	1	4	4	0	6	Advance to Quarter-finals
3	Cuba	3	1	0	2	2	14	−12	3	Advance to Play-offs round
4	Qatar (G)	3	0	0	3	2	5	−3	0	Advance to Play-offs round

Source: CONCACAF
Rules for classification: Tiebreakers
(G) Guests
6 August 2023
18:00

Haiti	3–1	Cuba

Estadio Panamericano, Santo Domingo
6 August 2023
20:00

United States	3–2	Qatar
Cavan Sullivan 3'; Chase Adams 19'; Julian Hall 38'

Estadio Panamericano, Santo Domingo

7 August 2023
18:00

Cuba	0–11	United States
		Jamir Johnson (x3); Tanner Rosborough (x2); Omar Marquez (x2); Luca Moisa (x2); Julian Hall; Cavan Sullivan

Estadio Panamericano, Santo Domingo
7 August 2023
20:00

Qatar	0–1	Haiti

Estadio Panamericano, Santo Domingo

8 August 2023
18:00

Cuba	1–0	Qatar

Estadio Panamericano, Santo Domingo
8 August 2023
20:00

United States	3–0	Haiti
Jude Terry; Tanner Rosborough; Chase Adams

Estadio Panamericano, Santo Domingo

==== Group C ====
Pos	Team	Pld	W	D	L	GF	GA	GD	Pts	Qualification
1	Canada	3	3	0	0	7	1	+6	9	Advance to Quarter-finals
2	Guatemala	3	1	1	1	3	2	+1	4 (Note: Guatemala scored lower fair play points than Panama to advance to the quarter-finals.)	Advance to Quarter-finals
3	Panama	3	1	1	1	3	2	+1	4	Advance to Play-offs round
4	Dominican Republic (H)	3	0	0	3	2	10	−8	0	Advance to Play-offs round

Source: CONCACAF
Rules for classification: Tiebreakers
(H) Hosts
Notes:
6 August 2023
14:00

Panama	0–0	Guatemala

Félix Sánchez Olympic Stadium, Santo Domingo
6 August 2023
16:00

Canada	4–1	Dominican Republic
Grady McDonnell 4', 26'; Andre Ali-Gayapersad 13'; Kevin Khan 33'		Daniel Fernández 21'

Félix Sánchez Olympic Stadium, Santo Domingo
Attendance: 200

7 August 2023
14:00

Guatemala	0–2	Canada
		William Daniels 28'; Kemari Record-Wright 63'

Félix Sánchez Olympic Stadium, Santo Domingo
Attendance: 75
7 August 2023
16:00

Dominican Republic	1–3	Panama
Luís Pereyra 52' (pen.)		Gerson Gordón 28'; Walter Muñoz 32'; Abraham Altamirano 67' (pen.)

Félix Sánchez Olympic Stadium, Santo Domingo

8 August 2023
14:00

Guatemala	3–0	Dominican Republic
Marvin Ávila Jr 2', 28', 33'

Félix Sánchez Olympic Stadium, Santo Domingo
8 August 2023
16:00

Canada	1–0	Panama
William Daniels 49'

Félix Sánchez Olympic Stadium, Santo Domingo
Attendance: 40

==== Group D ====
Pos	Team	Pld	W	D	L	GF	GA	GD	Pts	Qualification
1	Honduras	3	1	2	0	2	1	+1	5	Advance to Quarter-finals
2	Puerto Rico	3	1	1	1	3	3	0	4	Advance to Quarter-finals
3	Costa Rica	3	1	1	1	2	3	−1	4	Advance to Play-offs round
4	Trinidad and Tobago	3	1	0	2	4	4	0	3	Advance to Play-offs round

Source: CONCACAF
Rules for classification: Tiebreakers
6 August 2023
18:00

Costa Rica	2–1	Puerto Rico

Félix Sánchez Olympic Stadium, Santo Domingo
6 August 2023
20:00

Honduras	2–1	Trinidad and Tobago

Félix Sánchez Olympic Stadium, Santo Domingo

7 August 2023
18:00

Puerto Rico	0–0	Honduras

Félix Sánchez Olympic Stadium, Santo Domingo

8 August 2023
18:00

Puerto Rico	2–1	Trinidad and Tobago

Félix Sánchez Olympic Stadium, Santo Domingo
8 August 2023
20:00

Honduras	0–0	Costa Rica

Félix Sánchez Olympic Stadium, Santo Domingo

9 August 2023 (Note: The Trinidad and Tobago vs Costa Rica match, originally scheduled on 7 August at 20:00 local time (UTC−4), was re-scheduled for 9 August at 14:00 local time by weather conditions.)
14:00

Trinidad and Tobago	2–0	Costa Rica
Jeremiah Daniel; Jonathan Mason

Félix Sánchez Olympic Stadium, Santo Domingo

=== Knockout stage ===
==== Play-offs round ====
Teams that did not advance to the quarter-finals were seeded based on their group stage results in order to establish the match-ups for the play-offs round.

Pos	Grp	Team	Pld	W	D	L	GF	GA	GD	Pts	Play-offs round
1	C	Panama	3	1	1	1	3	2	+1	4	Play-off 1
2	D	Costa Rica	3	1	1	1	2	3	−1	4	Play-off 2
3	D	Trinidad and Tobago	3	1	0	2	4	4	0	3	Play-off 3
4	A	El Salvador	3	1	0	2	5	6	−1	3	Play-off 4
5	B	Cuba	3	1	0	2	2	14	−12	3	Play-off 4
6	B	Qatar	3	0	0	3	2	5	−3	0	Play-off 3
7	C	Dominican Republic (H)	3	0	0	3	2	10	−8	0	Play-off 2
8	A	Saudi Arabia	3	0	0	3	2	13	−11	0	Play-off 1

Source: CONCACAF
Rules for classification: Tiebreakers
(H) Hosts
10 August 2023
14:00

El Salvador	3–0	Cuba
Kerim Torres 52'; Matthew Benavides 63', 70'

Estadio Panamericano, Santo Domingo
10 August 2023
16:00

Trinidad and Tobago	3–0	Qatar

Estadio Panamericano, Santo Domingo
10 August 2023
18:00

Costa Rica	3–1	Dominican Republic
Kazmir Foster (x2); Isaac Badilla

Estadio Panamericano, Santo Domingo
10 August 2023
20:00

Panama	1–2	Saudi Arabia
Gerson Gordón 29'		Ali Al-Shanqeeti 53'; Tarish Hazazi 70'

Estadio Panamericano, Santo Domingo

==== Bracket ====
Quarter-finals
10 August 2023
Honduras	1
Jamaica	4
10 August 2023
Mexico	1
Puerto Rico	0
10 August 2023
Canada	0
Haiti	1
10 August 2023
United States	4
Guatemala	1

Semi-finals
11 August 2023
Jamaica	0
Mexico	3
11 August 2023
Haiti	0
United States	1

Final
12 August 2023
Mexico	2
United States	4
Third place
12 August 2023
Jamaica	1
Haiti	3

==== Quarter-finals ====
10 August 2023
14:00

Honduras	1–4	Jamaica

Félix Sánchez Olympic Stadium, Santo Domingo
10 August 2023
16:00

Mexico	1–0	Puerto Rico
A. Villa 57'

Félix Sánchez Olympic Stadium, Santo Domingo
10 August 2023
18:00

Canada	0–1	Haiti
		Bill Meranvil 53'

Félix Sánchez Olympic Stadium, Santo Domingo
10 August 2023
20:00

United States	4–1	Guatemala
Isaac Tortola; Cavan Sullivan (pen.); Adrian Sanders; Chase Adams (pen.)		Marvin Ávila Jr 50'

Félix Sánchez Olympic Stadium, Santo Domingo

==== Semi-finals ====
11 August 2023
18:00

Jamaica	0–3	Mexico
		B. Rodríguez 33'; G. Mora 42', 56'

Félix Sánchez Olympic Stadium, Santo Domingo
11 August 2023
20:00

Haiti	0–1	United States
		Sebasthian Chavez 41'

Félix Sánchez Olympic Stadium, Santo Domingo

==== Third place match ====
12 August 2023
11:00

Jamaica	1–3	Haiti

Félix Sánchez Olympic Stadium, Santo Domingo

==== Final ====
12 August 2023
14:00

Mexico	2–4	United States
	Report	Adams, Johnson; Hall

Félix Sánchez Olympic Stadium, Santo Domingo
