= United States boys' national under-15 soccer team =

National association football team

United States Under-15 Boys
- Nickname: Baby Nats
- Association: United States Soccer Federation
- Confederation: CONCACAF
- Sub-confederation: NAFU (North America)
- Head coach: Ross Brady
- FIFA code: USA
First colors	Second colors

First international
- United States 2–0 Canada (Bradenton, United States; August 13, 2017)

Biggest win
- Cuba 0–11 United States (Santo Domingo, Dominica Republic; August 7, 2023)

CONCACAF Boys' Under-15 Championship
- Appearances: 4 (first in 2017)
- Best result: Champions (2023)
Medal record
CONCACAF Boys' Under-15 Championship
Gold medal – first place	2023 Dominican Republic
Silver medal – second place	2017 United States
Silver medal – second place	2025 Costa Rica

The United States U-15 boys national soccer team represents the United States in tournaments and friendly matches at the under-15 level. They won the CONCACAF Boys' Under-15 Championship in 2023.

== Competitive record ==
=== CONCACAF Boys' Under-15 Championship ===
CONCACAF Boys' Under-15 Championship result
Rankings		Tournament									Manager
League	P/R	Year	Result	Pld	W	D	L	GF	GA	Squad	Manager
Did not enter		(Cayman Islands) 2013	Did not enter								Pérez
A	Same position	(United States) 2017	Runners-up	5	4	1	0	15	3	Squad	van den Bergh
A	Same position	(United States) 2019	Semifinals	5	4	1	0	11	3	Squad	Peay
Cancelled		2021	Cancelled due to COVID-19 pandemic								Segares
A	Same position	(Curaçao) (Dominican Republic) 2023	Champions	6	6	0	0	26	5	Squad	Heinemann
A	Same position	(Aruba) (Costa Rica) (Curaçao) 2025	Runners-up	5	2	1	2	7	10	Squad	Brady
—	—	Total	1 title	21	16	3	2	59	21	—	—

== Results and schedule ==
The following is a list of match results in the last 12 months, as well as any future matches that have been scheduled.

Legend

Win Draw Lose Fixture

=== 2026 ===
February 12, 2026 friendly	Cyprus	0–4	United States
		Report	Odom 5'; Gonzalez 68'; Suarez 87'; Loyo 90'

February 12, 2026 friendly	United States	v	England

April 16, 2026 friendly	United States	0–0	Mexico
		Report

April 19, 2026 friendly	United States	v	Mexico

May 19, 2026 friendly	South Korea	0–1	United States	Varaždin, Croatia
		Report		Stadium: Sveti Martin na Muri Stadium

May 20, 2026 friendly	Switzerland	0–3	United States	Varaždin, Croatia
		Report	Washington; Loyo Reynaga; Flowers	Stadium: Graničar Kotoriba Stadium

May 22, 2026 friendly	Portugal	2–2	United States	Varaždin, Croatia
		Report	Loyo Reynaga; Levkovsky	Stadium: Sveti Martin na Muri Stadium

== Players ==
=== Current squad ===
20 players were called up for September 2026 training camp.

Caps and goals are current as of August 9, 2025, after match against Mexico.

No.	Pos.	Player	Date of birth (age)	Caps	Goals	Club
	GK	Sean Fields	(14)	0	0	(United States Soccer Federation) LA Galaxy Academy
	GK	Mario Martinez Reyes	(14)	0	0	(United States Soccer Federation) Orlando City Academy
	GK	Owen Rodier	(14)	0	0	(United States Soccer Federation) Inter Miami Academy
	DF	German Del Toro	(14)	0	0	(United States Soccer Federation) San Jose Earthquakes Academy
	DF	Tyler Edwards	(14)	0	0	(United States Soccer Federation) New York Red Bulls Academy
	DF	Jahiel Johnson	(14)	0	0	(United States Soccer Federation) FC Cincinnati Academy
	DF	Caleb Loriston	(14)	0	0	(United States Soccer Federation) New York City FC Academy
	DF	Charles Owensby	(14)	0	0	(United States Soccer Federation) Atlanta United Academy
	DF	Jackson Rhodes	(14)	0	0	(United States Soccer Federation) Atlanta United Academy
	DF	Isaiah Soto Vargas	(14)	0	0	(United States Soccer Federation) El Paso Locomotive Academy
	DF	Manuel Vasquez	(14)	0	0	(United States Soccer Federation) Houston Dynamo Academy
	MF	Lincoln Clark	(14)	0	0	(United States Soccer Federation) FC Dallas Academy
	MF	Jonathan David	(14)	0	0	(United States Soccer Federation) New York Red Bulls Academy
	MF	Ezra Guyette	(14)	0	0	(United States Soccer Federation) San Jose Earthquakes Academy
	MF	Eduardo Iglesias	(14)	0	0	(United States Soccer Federation) Houston Dynamo Academy
	MF	Koa Kreps	(14)	0	0	(United States Soccer Federation) San Diego FC Academy
	MF	Anthony Nunez	(14)	0	0	(United States Soccer Federation) LAFC Academy
	MF	Diego Roque	(14)	0	0	(United States Soccer Federation) New York City FC Academy
	FW	Cyro Barrios Ramirez	(14)	0	0	(United States Soccer Federation) New York Red Bulls Academy
	FW	Sebastian Bennett	(14)	0	0	(United States Soccer Federation) Inter Miami Academy
	FW	Bodie Mass	(14)	0	0	(United States Soccer Federation) FC Florida
	FW	Nehemias Molina Baladi	(14)	0	0	(United States Soccer Federation) Orlando City Academy
	FW	Juan Perez Rios	(14)	0	0	(United States Soccer Federation) Seattle Sounders Academy
	FW	Jaxon Vereen	(14)	0	0	(United States Soccer Federation) New York City FC Academy

=== Recent call-ups ===
The following players were called up in the past 12 months.

- 2026 Vlatko Marković International Tournament
- April 2026 friendlies
- March 2026 training camp.
- February 2026 friendlies.

Pos.	Player	Date of birth (age)	Caps	Goals	Club	Latest call-up
GK	Luan Silva	(14)	0	0	(United States) Orlando City Academy	2026 Vlatko Marković International Tournament
GK	Alex Bayraktarov	(14)	0	0	(United States) Chicago Fire FC	2026 Vlatko Marković International Tournament
GK	Zach Lapierre	(14)	0	0	(United States) New England Revolution Academy	April 2026 friendlies
GK	London Stern	(14)	0	0	(United States) Barca Residency Academy	March 2026 training camp
GK	Henry Wang	(14)	0	0	(United States) Charlotte FC Academy	March 2026 training camp
GK	Thomas White	(14)	0	0	(United States) Philadelphia Union Academy	March 2026 training camp
DF	Santiago Alvarez	(14)	0	0	(United States) Houston Dynamo Academy	2026 Vlatko Marković International Tournament
DF	Aidan Carlos	(14)	0	0	(United States) Los Angeles FC Academy	2026 Vlatko Marković International Tournament
DF	Keyvan Figueroa	(14)	0	0	(England) Burnley F.C. Academy	2026 Vlatko Marković International Tournament
DF	Julian Lake	(14)	0	0	(France) Monaco Academy	2026 Vlatko Marković International Tournament
DF	Matthew Leone	(14)	0	0	(United States) LA Galaxy Academy	2026 Vlatko Marković International Tournament
DF	Mason Moskau	(14)	0	0	(United States) Atlanta United Academy	2026 Vlatko Marković International Tournament
DF	Ethan O’Neil	(14)	0	0	(United States) Barca Resident Academy	2026 Vlatko Marković International Tournament
DF	Mason Washington	(14)	1	1	(United States) Los Angeles FC Academy	2026 Vlatko Marković International Tournament
DF	Reggie Bailey	(14)	0	0	(United States) San Jose Earthquakes Academy	April 2026 friendlies
DF	Zorion Civil	(14)	0	0	(United States) Orlando City Academy	April 2026 friendlies
DF	Gage Lewis	(14)	0	0	(United States) Columbus Crew Academy	April 2026 friendlies
DF	Easton Odom	(14)	0	0	(United States) Barca Resident Academy	April 2026 friendlies
DF	Colin Panarelli	(14)	0	0	(United States) New York City FC Academy	
DF	Aiden Appiah	(14)	0	0	(United States) Colorado Rapids Academy	March 2026 training camp
DF	Dempsey Biller	(14)	0	0	(United States) Chicago Fire Academy	March 2026 training camp
DF	Will Moddelmog	(14)	0	0	(United States) Houston Dynamo	March 2026 training camp
DF	Harrison Storey	(14)	0	0	(United States) Chicago Fire Academy	March 2026 training camp
DF	Wes Wolfley	(14)	0	0	(United States) Phoenix Rising Academy	March 2026 training camp
DF	Jaxson Fulmer	(14)	0	0	(United States) Philadelphia Union Academy	February 2026 friendlies
DF	Wilson Mazariegos	(14)	0	0	(United States) San Jose Earthquakes Academy	February 2026 friendlies
MF	Bradley Castro	(14)	0	0	(United States) New York Red Bulls Academy	2026 Vlatko Marković International Tournament
MF	Chris Gonzalez	(14)	1	1	(United States) Houston Dynamo Academy	2026 Vlatko Marković International Tournament
MF	Zamir Loyo Reynaga	(14)	3	3	(United States) Sporting Kansas City Academy	2026 Vlatko Marković International Tournament
MF	Diego Ros	(14)	0	0	(United States) Barca Resident Academy	2026 Vlatko Marković International Tournament
MF	Cosimo Tristani	(14)	0	0	(United States) Barca Resident Academy	2026 Vlatko Marković International Tournament
MF	Levi Welch	(14)	0	0	(United States) LAFC Academy	2026 Vlatko Marković International Tournament
MF	Immanuel Adewunmi	(14)	0	0	(United States) Columbus Crew Academy	April 2026 friendlies
MF	Elvis Caushaj	(14)	0	0	(United States) Columbus Crew Academy	April 2026 friendlies
MF	Ian Miller	(14)	0	0	(United States) Portland Timbers Academy	April 2026 friendlies
MF	Dinolen Shang	(14)	0	0	(United States) San Jose Earthquakes Academy	April 2026 friendlies
MF	Maxi Alvarez	(14)	0	0	(United States) Orlando City Academy	March 2026 training camp
MF	Thomas Dimaria	(14)	0	0	(United States) St. Louis City SC Academy	February 2026 friendlies
MF	Samuel Harris	(14)	0	0	(United States) St. Louis City SC Academy	February 2026 friendlies
FW	Christopher Fitanidis	(14)	0	0	(United States) Cedar Stars Academy-Bergen	2026 Vlatko Marković International Tournament
FW	Benjamin Flowers	(14)	1	1	(United States) FC Dallas Academy	2026 Vlatko Marković International Tournament
FW	Zamir Loyo Reynaga	(14)	0	0	(United States) Sporting Kansas City II	2026 Vlatko Marković International Tournament
FW	Nosa Osagie	(14)	0	0	(United States) Minnesota United Academy	2026 Vlatko Marković International Tournament
FW	Kenzynton Pierre	(14)	0	0	(United States) Houston Dynamo Academy	2026 Vlatko Marković International Tournament
FW	Ryan Schlotterbeck	(14)	0	0	(United States) FC Cincinnati Academy	2026 Vlatko Marković International Tournament
FW	Williver Chea	(14)	0	0	(United States) Atlanta United Academy	April 2026 friendlies
FW	Santi Suarez-Couri	(14)	0	0	(United States) Atlanta United Academy	April 2026 friendlies
FW	Gabriel Vasquez Carmichael	(14)	0	0	(United States) D.C. United Academy	April 2026 friendlies
FW	Romualdo Aguirre	(14)	0	0	(Mexico) CF Monterrey Academy	March 2026 training camp
FW	Arman Alagha	(14)	0	0	(United States) Barca Residency Academy	March 2026 training camp
FW	Oscar Olsen	(14)	0	0	(United States) Houston Dynamo	March 2026 training camp
FW	Daniel Brown	(14)	0	0	(United States) Charlotte FC Academy	February 2026 friendlies
FW	Rikelme De Almeida	(14)	0	0	(United States) Paranaense Academy	February 2026 friendlies

== Head coaches ==
This list may be incomplete.

- (United States) Tony Lepore (2011–2013)
- (United States) Hugo Pérez (2013–2014)
- (United States) John Hackworth (2014–2015)
- (Netherlands) Dave van den Bergh (2016–2018)
- (United States) Clint Peay (2018–2019)
- (Costa Rica) Gonzalo Segares (2020–2021)
- (United States) Tom Heinemann (2022−2025)
- (United States) Ross Brady (2025–present)

== Honors ==
- CONCACAF Under-15 Championship
  - Winners (1): 2023
  - Runners-up (1): 2017
