= Benjamin Flowers (disambiguation) =

Benjamin Flowers may refer to:

- Benjamin Flowers, American author
- Benjamin M. Flowers (born 1987), American lawyer
- Benji Flowers (born 2011), American soccer player
