= Sportpark Höhenberg =

German stadium in Cologne

Coordinates: 50.9452°N 7.0304°E

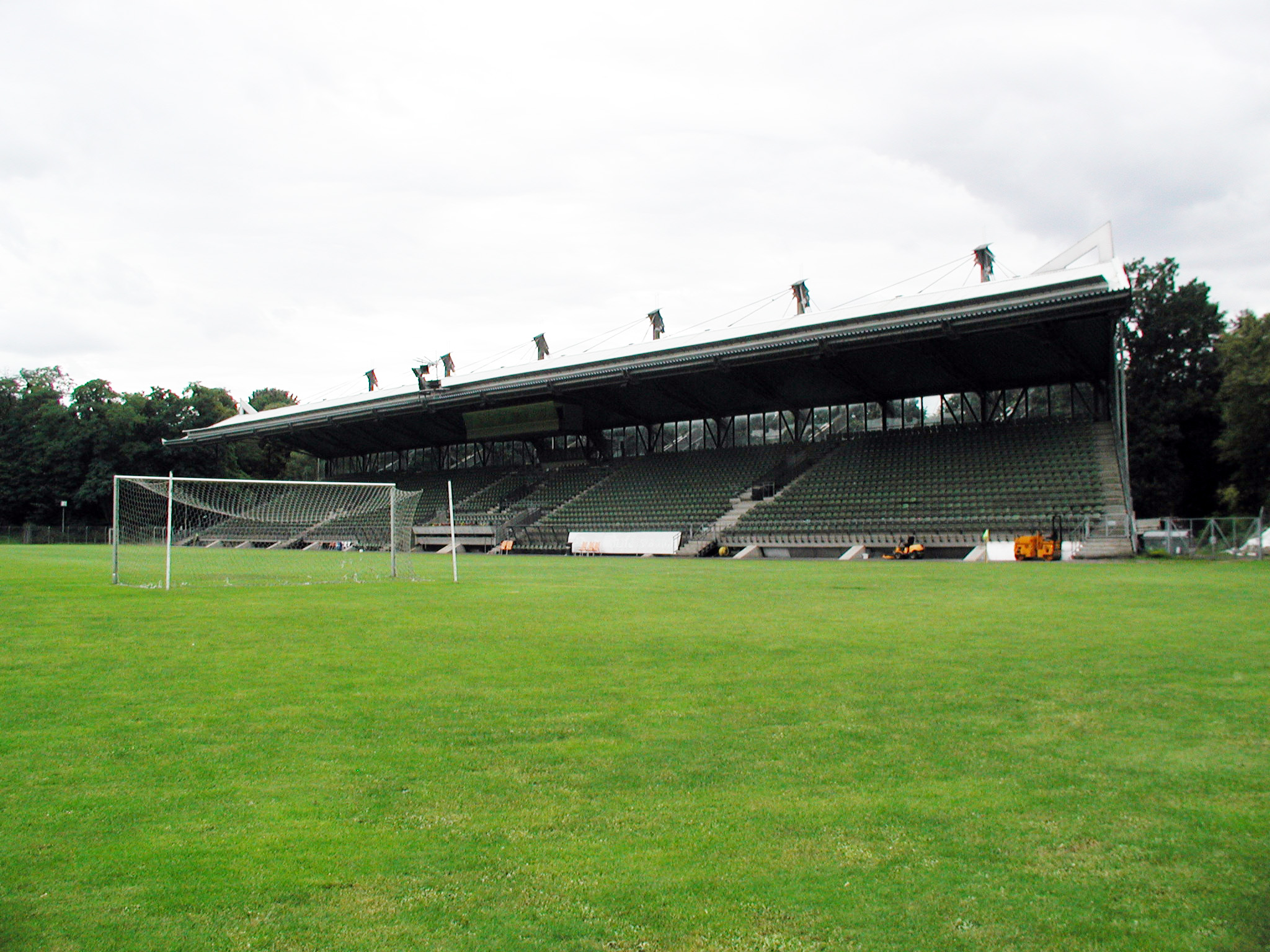
- The stadium's main stands
- Interactive map of Sportpark Höhenberg
- Former names: Flughafenstadion (1990s)
- Location: Cologne, Germany
- Owner: City of Cologne (1931–1999); Kölner Sportstätten GmbH (1999–present)
- Operator: Kölner Sportstätten GmbH
- Capacity: 8,343
- Surface: Grass

Construction
- Groundbreaking: 1931
- Opened: 20 September 1931
- Renovated: 2011, 2012, 2019, 2021

Tenants
- Viktoria Köln; Cologne Crocodiles; TuS Köln rrh.

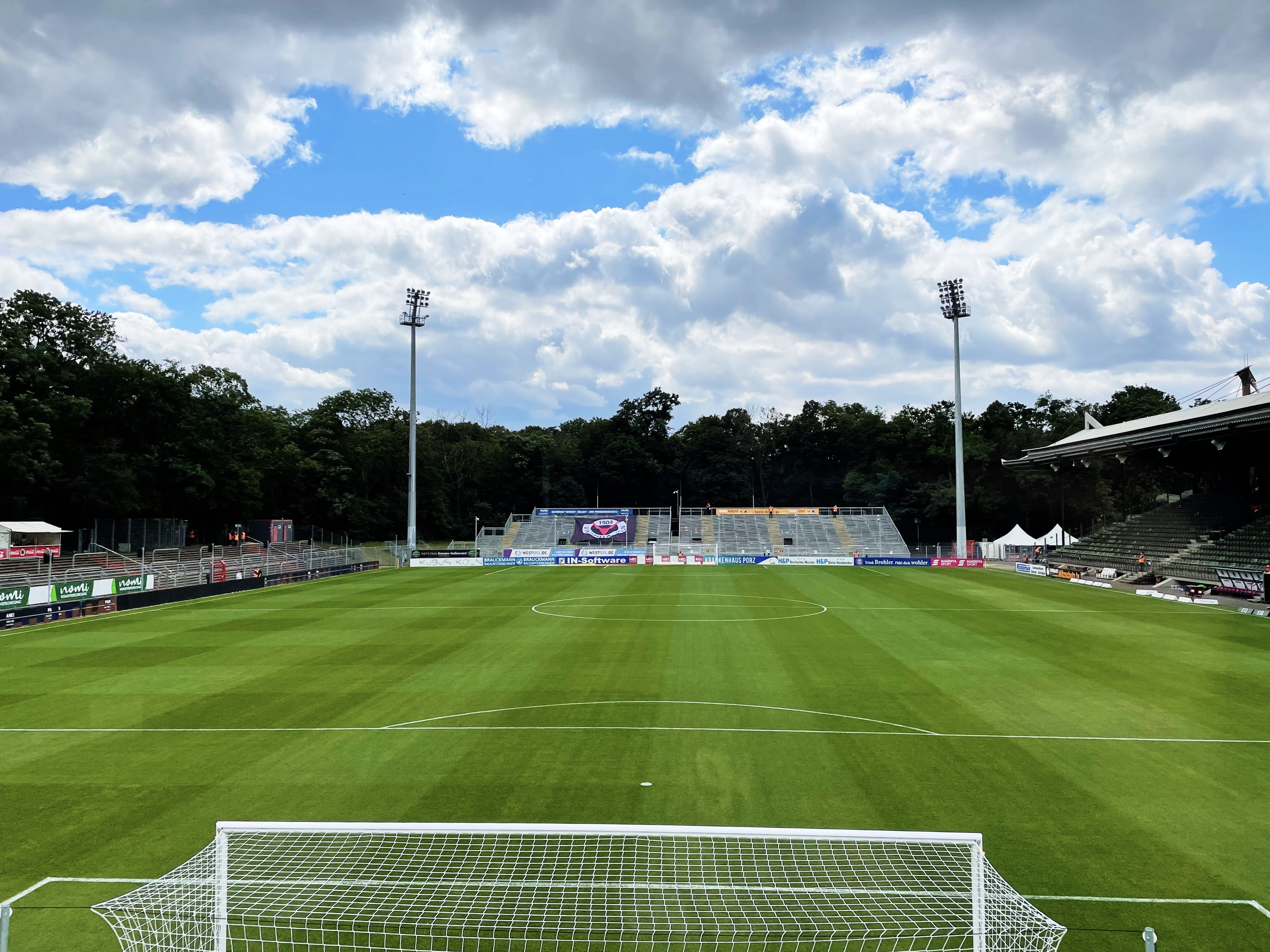
View of the south stands constructed in 2019 and the pitch turf newly laid in summer 2021

Sportpark Höhenberg is a sports facility in the Merheimer Heide in Cologne's Höhenberg quarter on the right bank of the Rhine. The football stadium belonging to the facility is the home ground of association football club Viktoria Köln and American football team Cologne Crocodiles. Currently, the sports facility seats 8,343.

== The facility ==
The first sports facility was opened in August 1921. The "VfR-Stadion" built by VfR Köln was designed purely as a football stadium and had a capacity of 30,000 spectators. As part of the Green Belt expansion, the stadium was converted into an athletics stadium between 1929 and 1931 and the capacity was reduced to 18,000 seats. The reopening as "Sportpark Höhenberg" took place on 20 September 1931 in front of 8,000 spectators with a friendly match between VfR Köln and Schalke 04. There was a seating grandstand for the first time in 1969, when a roofed steel tube grandstand for approx. 1,200 spectators were erected. Shortly afterward, the back straight, which like the rest of the stadium had consisted only of grass walls, was also fixed with standing crossbars. This reduced the capacity to 12,000.

At the end of the 1980s, a new 3,000-seat grandstand was built and the back straight was further reinforced. To make room for the new stand, the running track was removed and the pitch moved towards the back straight. Since then, it has once again been a pure football stadium, as it opened in 1921, with up to 15,000 seats at times.

The sports facility has an artificial turf pitch and six tennis courts. In the 1990s, the stadium was temporarily called Flughafenstadion (airport stadium), as Cologne Bonn Airport, the main sponsor of VfR Köln's successor, then-Regionalliga team Preußen Köln, had acquired the naming rights. Although the company was once again the main sponsor of Preußen's successor club Viktoria Köln between 2011 and 2015, the name was not changed again. The operator of the facility is the Kölner Sportstätten GmbH. In 2011, the facility was renovated for NRW-Liga matches. In May 2012, the back straight was renovated and a floodlight system was installed to make the stadium suitable for the Regionalliga West. According to the operator, the total costs amounted to around 1.5 million euros.

After Viktoria Köln was promoted to the 2019–20 3. Liga, the stadium was expanded to the required number of 10,001 seats by adding additional stands.

In summer 2021, a new pitch turf including turf heating was laid. The sprinkler system was also renewed. For the rugby and American football matches, two additional foundations, each one metre deep, were laid into which the field goals can be inserted.

After the DFB reduced the minimum capacity for the 3. Liga to 5,000 for the 2022–23 season, a part of the new south stand construction was removed again. Since then, the stadium can hold up to 8,343 spectators, of which 5,117 are standing and 3,226 are seated.

Immediately to the south is the club-owned facility of TuS Köln rrh. with two football pitches, one of which is surrounded by a blue tartan track, and several tennis courts. Although spatially the facility belongs to Sportpark Höhenberg, it is often not counted as part of it because of a different owner.

== Use ==
The stadium is the home ground of Viktoria Köln. In addition, almost all predecessor clubs have played at least some of the time at Sportpark Höhenberg. During the 2005 FIFA Confederations Cup and the 2006 FIFA World Cup, the national teams of Tunisia, Japan and France used the stadium for training sessions. Manchester United also used the sports park in August 2020 for training sessions ahead of their semi-final match against Sevilla in the 2019–20 UEFA Europa League.

Sportpark Höhenberg has hosted at least one rugby union international match every year since 2016. On 19 March 2016, the stadium hosted the 2014–2016 European Nations Cup First Division match Germany against Spain. The sold-out match in front of 6,214 spectators ended in a 17–17 draw. On 11 March 2017, the German national rugby team played another international match against Spain as part of the 2016–17 Rugby Europe International Championships, with Spain prevailing 32–15. As part of the 2017–18 Rugby Europe International Championships, the German national rugby team met Russia on 18 March 2018. However, the match was lost 3–57 in front of a crowd of around 2,600. Most recently, Germany played Spain again on 17 March 2019 as part of the 2018–19 Rugby Europe International Championships, but again lost the match 10–33. Since 2016, RSV Köln has been responsible for hosting the international matches in rugby union.

Starting in the 2021–22 season, Sportpark Höhenberg was selected as the final stadium of the Middle Rhine Cup; the Middle Rhine Football Association settled on the stadium until 2026.

== Transport ==
Sportpark Höhenberg is located on Frankfurter Straße, the Bundesstraße 8. About 900 m away is an access road to the B 55a, which leads to the Autobahn interchange Köln-Ost after one kilometre. The Höhenberg Frankfurter Straße stop of the Cologne Stadtbahn line 1 and the bus lines 151 and 152 is only 300 m away from the stadium.

== Awards ==
In 1993, the sports facility was awarded the international architecture prize of the International Olympic Committee and the International Association for Sports and Leisure Facilities, the IOC/IAKS Award.
