= Emiliano Muñoz =

Mexican footballer (born 2010)

Personal information
- Full name: Emiliano Muñoz Meade
- Date of birth: 11 January 2010 (age 16)
- Place of birth: San Luis Potosí, Mexico
- Height: 1.77 m (5 ft 10 in)
- Position: Forward

Team information
- Current team: Atlético Madrid

Youth career
- –2026: Atlético San Luis
- 2026–: Atlético Madrid

International career^{‡}
Years	Team	Apps	(Gls)
2024–2025	Mexico U15	6	(0)
2026–	Mexico U16	3	(0)
- ‡ National team caps and goals as of 6 April 2026

Emiliano Muñoz Meade (born 11 January 2010) is a Mexican professional footballer who plays as a forward for Atlético Madrid.

== Early life ==
Muñoz was born on 11 January 2010 in San Luis Potosí, Mexico. He is related to Mexico international Carlos Muñoz.

== Club career ==
Muñoz joined the youth academy of Atlético San Luis at the age of 14, where he was the top scorer of the 2025 MADCUP with 18 goals.

In 2025, he was promoted to their under-19 team, where he made 12 league appearances. Following his stint there, he joined the youth academy of Spanish La Liga side Atlético Madrid.

== International career ==
Muñoz is a Mexico youth international and has represented the country internationally at under-15 and under-16 level. On 26 November 2024, he debuted for the Mexico national under-15 football team during a 0–4 away friendly loss to Spain.

Muñoz made six appearances for the Mexico U15s. On 31 March 2026, he debuted for the Mexico national under-16 football team during a 0–1 home friendly loss to Portugal.

== Style of play ==
Muñoz plays as a forward. Mexican newspaper Vanguardia wrote in 2026 that he "has stood out for his goal-scoring ability, his movement in the final third, and his tactical awareness to exploit space... technical reports indicate that the striker combines physical power with attacking intelligence, allowing him to adapt to different attacking formations".
