= Mexico national under-15 football team =

Under 15 national football team

Mexico U-15
- Nickname(s): El Tri (The Tri); El Tricolor (The Tricolor); Los Niños Héroes (The Hero Boys)
- Association: Mexican Football Federation (Federación Mexicana de Fútbol)
- Confederation: CONCACAF
- Head coach: Marvin Cabrera
- FIFA code: MEX
First colours	Second colours

First international
- Mexico 3–1 Chile (Toluca, Mexico; May 28, 2012)

Biggest win
- Nicaragua 0–9 Mexico (Alajuela, Costa rica; August 3, 2025)

Biggest defeat
- Mexico 0–4 Italy (Gradisca d'Isonzo, Italy; April 27, 2017)

CONCACAF Under-15 Championship
- Appearances: 4 (first in 2017)
- Best result: Champions, 2017, 2025

The Mexico national under-15 football team represents Mexico in tournaments and friendly matches at the Under-15 level. They have appeared in one CONCACAF Under-15 Championship in 2017, where they finished as champions.

== History ==
Since 2012, Mexico has hosted the U-15 Mexico Copa de Naciones, and won the inaugural title against Colombia U15s by penalties on 12 June 2012.

Coached by Juan Carlos Ortega, the Mexico U15s won the 2017 in a 2-0 final against the USA U15s. They finished the tournament with a perfect record winning all 5 matches, scoring 15 goals and conceding none.

== Competitive record ==
=== FIFA U-15 World Cup & Festival ===
FIFA U-15 World Cup & Festival record
Year	Round	Position	Pld	W	D*	L	GF	GA
(Azerbaijan) 2026	Qualified							
Total		1/1						

=== CONCACAF Under-15 Championship ===
CONCACAF Under-15 Championship
Year	Round	Position	Pld	W	D*	L	GF	GA	Pts
(Cayman Islands) 2013	did not enter								
(United States) 2017	Champions	1st	5	5	0	0	15	0	15
(Costa Rica) 2025	Champions	1st	5	4	0	1	24	4	12
Total	2 Titles	1/2	5	5	0	0	15	0	15

== Results and schedule ==
The following is a list of match results in the last 12 months, as well as any future matches that have been scheduled.

Legend

Win Draw Lose Fixture

=== 2025 ===
November 6, 2025 Club Friendly	Elche CF Academy (Spain)	0–4	Mexico	Alicante, Spain
		Report	Peleteiro; Gil; Muñoz; Ruiz	Stadium: Albir Garden Resort

November 7, 2025 Friendly	Poland	5–3	Mexico	Alicante, Spain
		Report	Martínez Jr x2; Torres	Stadium: Albir Garden Resort

November 8, 2025 Friendly	Norway	3–0	Mexico	Alicante, Spain
		Report		Stadium: Albir Garden Resort

=== 2026 ===
April 16, 2026 friendly	United States	0–0	Mexico	Chula Vista, California
		Report

April 19, 2026 friendly	United States	3–3	Mexico	Chula Vista, California
		Report	A. Muñoz; Cortés; Villareal

August 29, 2026 Friendly Tournament	Mexico	3–0	Panama	Mexico City, Mexico
	Aguirre; González; Soriano	Report		Stadium: Centro de Alto Rendimiento

August 30, 2026 Friendly Tournament	Mexico	4–0	Peru	Mexico City, Mexico
	Godínez; O'Neil; González; Soriano	Report		Stadium: Centro de Alto Rendimiento

August 31, 2026 Friendly Tournament	Mexico	2–0	(United States) Houston Dynamo Academy	Mexico City, Mexico
	Villarreal; Soriano	Report		Stadium: Centro de Alto Rendimiento

== Players ==
=== Current squad ===
22 players were called up for the Torneo 4 Naciones

Caps and goals are current as of September 6, 2026, after match against Houston Dynamo U-15.

No.	Pos.	Player	Date of birth (age)	Caps	Goals	Club
	GK	Miguel Escobedo	(14)	0	0	(Mexican Football Federation) Santos Laguna Academy
	GK	David Jaimes	(14)	0	0	(United States Soccer Federation) FC Dallas Academy
	DF	Santiago Cortés	(14)	1	1	(Mexican Football Federation) C.F. Pachuca Academy
	DF	Emiliano García	(14)	0	0	(Mexican Football Federation) C.D. Guadalajara Academy
	DF	Ethan O’Neil	(14)	1	1	(United States Soccer Federation) Barca Residency Academy
	DF	Uriel Torres	(14)	0	0	(Mexican Football Federation) Club América Academy
	DF	Bentley Washington	(14)	0	0	(United States Soccer Federation) LAFC Academy
	DF	Giovanni Zambrano	(14)	0	0	(United States Soccer Federation) Chicago Fire Academy
	MF	Luis Bermúdez	(14)	0	0	(Mexican Football Federation) Club León Academy
	MF	Cirilo Carlos	(14)	0	0	(United States Soccer Federation) LAFC Academy
	MF	Henry Godínez	(14)	8	2	(Mexican Football Federation) Tigres UANL Academy
	MF	Christopher González	(14)	1	1	(United States Soccer Federation) Houston Dynamo Academy
	MF	Guillermo Gutiérrez	(14)	0	0	(Mexican Football Federation) Santos Laguna Academy
	MF	Roberto Hernández	(14)	0	0	(Mexican Football Federation) C.F. Pachuca Academy
	MF	Edgar Medina	(14)	0	0	(Mexican Football Federation) Santos Laguna Academy
	MF	Aarón Muñoz	(14)	1	1	(Mexican Football Federation) Club América Academy
	FW	Romualdo Aguirre	(14)	1	1	(Mexican Football Federation) C.F. Monterrey Academy
	FW	Jayden González	(14)	1	1	(United States Soccer Federation) Seattle Sounders Academy
	FW	Noé Salazar	(14)	0	0	(Mexican Football Federation) C.D. Guadalajara Academy
	FW	Xavier Soria	(14)	0	0	(United States Soccer Federation) Colorado Rapids Academy
	FW	Armando Soriano	(14)	3	3	(Mexican Football Federation) C.F. Monterrey Academy
	FW	Marcelo Villarreal	(14)	2	2	(Mexican Football Federation) C.D. Guadalajara Academy

=== Recent call-ups ===
The following players were called up in the past 12 months.

Pos.	Player	Date of birth (age)	Caps	Goals	Club	Latest call-up
GK	Matías Ortíz	(15)	0	0	(Mexico) Club Atlas Academy	April 2026 friendlies
GK	David Bernal	(16)	8	0	(Mexico) Club América Academy	November 2025 friendlies
GK	José Corona	(16)	8	0	(Mexico) Club Tijuana Academy	November 2025 friendlies
DF	Abdiel Almaguer	(15)	0	0	(Mexico) C.F. Monterrey Academy	April 2026 friendlies
DF	Uriel Torres	(15)	0	0	(Mexico) Club América Academy	April 2026 friendlies
DF	Alejandro Valdez	(15)	0	0	(Mexico) C.F. Pachuca Academy	April 2026 friendlies
DF	Mason Washington	(15)	0	0	(United States) LAFC Academy	April 2026 friendlies
DF	Alexander Aguilar	(15)	11	2	(Mexico) C.D. Guadalajara Academy	November 2025 friendlies
DF	Giovani García	(15)	11	0	(Mexico) Pumas UNAM Academy	November 2025 friendlies
DF	Juan Garza	(16)	11	0	(Mexico) C.F. Monterrey Academy	November 2025 friendlies
DF	Patricio Gil	(16)	2	1	(Mexico) C.F. Monterrey Academy	November 2025 friendlies
DF	Emilio Jasso	(16)	0	0	(Mexico) Toluca Academy	November 2025 friendlies
DF	Anxo Peleteiro	(16)	2	1	(Spain) Celta Academy	November 2025 friendlies
DF	Axel Sandoval	(16)	10	2	(Mexico) Club León Academy	November 2025 friendlies
DF	Manuel Vega	(16)	1	0	(Mexico) C.D. Guadalajara Academy	November 2025 friendlies
MF	Gerson Huerta	(15)	0	0	(Spain) Rayo Vallecano Academy	April 2026 friendlies
MF	Homero Madera	(15)	0	0	(Mexico) Tigres UANL Academy	April 2026 friendlies
MF	Diego Solis	(15)	0	0	(Mexico) FC Juárez Academy	April 2026 friendlies
MF	Landon Yescas	(15)	0	0	(Bulgaria) Levski Sofia Academy	April 2026 friendlies
MF	Juan Carlos Martínez	(16)	14	12	(Mexico) Querétaro	November 2025 friendlies
MF	Aaron Muñoz	(15)	0	0	(Mexico) Club América Academy	November 2025 friendlies
MF	Róbert Oliveras	(15)	10	1	(Spain) FC Barcelona Academy	November 2025 friendlies
MF	Dylan Reyes	(16)	13	1	(United States) Houston Dynamo Academy	November 2025 friendlies
MF	Lucas Silva	(15)	1	0	(Mexico) Toluca Academy	November 2025 friendlies
MF	Patricio Silva	(16)	10	4	(Mexico) C.F. Monterrey Academy	November 2025 friendlies
MF	Lisandro Torres	(16)	18	5	(United States) LAFC Academy	November 2025 friendlies
FW	Iker Estrada	(14)	0	0	(Mexico) C.F. Monterrey Academy	April 2026 friendlies
MF	Roberto Muro	(15)	0	0	(Mexico) C.F. Pachuca Academy	April 2026 friendlies
MF	Jorge Serrano	(15)	0	0	(Mexico) Club América Academy	April 2026 friendlies
FW	Matthew Arana	(16)	13	5	(United States) Houston Dynamo Academy	November 2025 friendlies
FW	Emiliano Muñoz	(16)	7	1	(Spain) Atlético Madrid Academy	November 2025 friendlies
FW	Joaquín Reyes	(16)	1	0	(Mexico) Pumas UNAM Academy	November 2025 friendlies
FW	Paxon Ruffin	(16)	6	3	(Mexico) C.F. Monterrey Academy	November 2025 friendlies
FW	Fernando Ruiz	(16)	1	1	(Mexico) Toluca Academy	November 2025 friendlies

== Honours ==
- CONCACAF Under-15 Championship
  - Winners (2): 2017, 2025
  - Runners-up (1): 2023

== See also ==
- Mexico national football team
- Mexico national under-23 football team
- Mexico national under-21 football team
- Mexico national under-20 football team
- Mexico national under-18 football team
- Mexico national under-17 football team
- Mexico women's national football team
- Mexico national beach football team
- Mexico national futsal team
