= Haiti national under-15 football team =

National association football team

Haiti
- Nickname(s): Les Grenadiers; Le Rouge et Bleu; Les Bicolores; La Sélection Nationale
- Association: Fédération Haïtienne de Football
- Confederation: CONCACAF
- Sub-confederation: CFU (Caribbean)
- Home stadium: Stade Sylvio Cator
- FIFA code: HAI
First colours	Second colours

CONCACAF Under-15 Championship
- Appearances: 4 (first in 2013)
- Best result: Third place (2023)
Medal record
Summer Youth Olympics
Silver medal – second place	2010 Singapore	Team

The Haiti national under-15 football team represents Haiti in international football at this age level and is controlled by the Fédération Haïtienne de Football (FHF).

== Competitive record ==
=== FIFA U-15 World Cup & Festival ===
FIFA U-15 World Cup & Festival record
Year	Round	Position	Pld	W	D*	L	GF	GA
(Azerbaijan) 2026	Qualified							
Total		1/1						

=== CONCACAF Under-15 Championship ===
CONCACAF Under-15 Championship record
Year	Result	Position	Pld	W	D*	L	GF	GA
(Cayman Islands) 2013	Group stage	14th	5	2	0	2	4	15
(United States) 2017	Champions - D2	1st	4	4	0	0	12	1
(United States) 2019	Quarter-finals	8th	4	1	1	2	2	10
2021	Cancelled due to COVID-19 pandemic							
(Dominican Republic) (Curaçao) 2023	Semi-finals	3rd	6	4	0	2	8	6
(Costa Rica) 2025	Withdrew							
Total	Third place	4/5	19	11	1	6	26	32

=== Summer Youth Olympics ===
Summer Youth Olympics record
Year	Result	Position	Pld	W	D*	L	GF	GA
(Singapore) 2010	Runners-up	2nd	4	2	0	2	4	15
(China) 2014	Not Invited							
Total	Runners-up	1/2	4	2	0	2	4	15

== See also ==
- Haiti national football team
- Haiti national under-17 football team
- Haiti national under-20 football team
- Haiti national under-23 football team
