= Sebastian Silva =

Sebastián Silva may refer to:

- Sebastián Silva (basketball) (born 1996), Chilean basketball player
- Sebastián Silva (director) (born 1979), Chilean film director
- Sebastián Silva (footballer) (born 1991), Chilean footballer
- Sebastián Silva (entertainer), Colombian internet personality
- Sebastian Silva, guitarist of American metal band Unto Others (band)
