= Juan Carlos Martínez =

Juan Carlos Martínez may refer to:

- Juan Carlos Martínez Camarena (born 1991), Mexican footballer
- Juan Carlos (footballer, born 1987), full name Juan Carlos Sánchez Martínez, Spanish footballer
