= Santiago Pérez =

Santiago Pérez may refer to:

- Santiago Pérez de Manosalbas (1830–1900), president of Colombia
- Santiago Pérez Eastman (1858–1925), Chilean farmer and politician
- Santiago Pérez Peña (born 1883), Chilean engineer and politician
- Santiago Pérez (racewalker) (born 1972), Spanish racewalker
- Santiago Pérez (baseball) (born 1975), Dominican baseball player
- Santiago Pérez (cyclist) (born 1977), Spanish cyclist
- Santiago Pérez (footballer) (born 1998), Uruguayan footballer

== See also ==
- Santiago Pérez Quiroz Airport, in Cauca, Colombia
