= 2017 CONCACAF Boys' Under-15 Championship =

Tournament details
- Host country: United States
- City: Bradenton, Florida
- Dates: 13–19 August
- Teams: 39 (from 1 confederation)
- Venue: 1 (in 1 host city)

Final positions
- Champions: Mexico (1st title)
- Runners-up: United States

Tournament statistics
- Matches played: 80
- Goals scored: 286 (3.58 per match)

The 2017 CONCACAF Boys' Under-15 Championship was an international football tournament, the second edition of the CONCACAF Boys' Under-15 Championship.

The competition was set to feature up to 40 teams from the CONCACAF region.

All times EDT (UTC−4).

== Teams ==
A total of 39 teams from CONCACAF competed.

Division 1 (8 teams)

- Canada
- Costa Rica
- Honduras
- Jamaica
- Mexico
- Panama
- Trinidad and Tobago
- United States

Division 2 (15 teams)

- Barbados
- Bermuda
- Cuba
- Curaçao
- Dominican Republic
- El Salvador
- Guadeloupe
- Guyana
- Haiti
- Martinique
- Nicaragua
- Puerto Rico
- Saint Kitts and Nevis
- Saint Lucia
- Suriname

Division 3 (16 teams)

- Anguilla
- Antigua and Barbuda
- Aruba
- Bahamas
- Bonaire
- British Virgin Islands
- Cayman Islands
- Dominica
- French Guiana
- Grenada
- Montserrat
- Saint Martin
- Saint Vincent and the Grenadines
- Sint Maarten
- Turks and Caicos Islands
- US Virgin Islands

== Venues ==
The competition took place at the IMG Academy in Bradenton, Florida, United States.

== Format ==
Each match shall last 70 minutes, comprising two periods of 35 minutes with an interval of 10 minutes in between. In the championship game, if the score is tied at the end of regulation time, two 10 minute overtime periods will be played. If the score is still tied at the end of overtime, kicks from the penalty mark shall be taken to determine the winner.

In Division 1, the eight teams are divided into two groups of four. After the group stage, the top two teams of each group advance to the semi-finals, where the winners advance to the final, while the remaining teams play in a final round classification match depending on their position.

In Division 2, the 15 teams are divided into three groups of four and one group of three. After the group stage, each team play in a final round classification match depending on their position (except the fourth-placed team of Group F).

In Division 3, the 16 teams are divided into four groups of four. After the group stage, each team play in a final round classification match depending on their position.

=== Tiebreakers ===
The following tiebreaking criteria were established by CONCACAF:

1. Greatest number of points obtained in all group matches
2. Goal difference in all group matches
3. Greatest number of goals scored in all group matches
4. Greatest number of points obtained in matches amongst teams still tied
5. Lots drawn

== Squads ==
Players born on or after 1 January 2002 are eligible to compete in the tournament. Each team could submit a squad of 18 players, two of whom must be goalkeepers (Regulations XIV.).

== Division 1 ==
=== Group stage ===
==== Group A ====
Pos	Team	Pld	W	D	L	GF	GA	GD	Pts	Qualification
1	Mexico	3	3	0	0	10	0	+10	9	Knockout stage
2	Panama	3	2	0	1	5	4	+1	6	Knockout stage
3	Honduras	3	1	0	2	5	9	−4	3	
4	Jamaica	3	0	0	3	0	7	−7	0	

Source: CONCACAF
Rules for classification: Tiebreakers
13 August 2017
09:00

Mexico	5–0	Honduras
Correa 18'; Ruiz 28'; Ortega 35'; Telles 40'; Martínez 46'	Report

IMG Academy, Bradenton
13 August 2017
11:00

Jamaica	0–1	Panama
	Report	Laguna 5'

IMG Academy, Bradenton

14 August 2017
09:00

Honduras	5–0	Jamaica
Vega 13', 29'; Medrano 20', 34'; Garcia 38'	Report

IMG Academy, Bradenton
14 August 2017
11:00

Panama	0–4	Mexico
	Report	Ortega 4'; Telles 13'; Gámez 38'; Corona 42'

IMG Academy, Bradenton

16 August 2017
09:00

Jamaica	0–1	Mexico
	Report	Gámez 67'

IMG Academy, Bradenton
16 August 2017
11:00

Panama	4–0	Honduras
Córdoba 18', 43'; Carrasquilla 27'; Castillo 71'	Report

IMG Academy, Bradenton

==== Group B ====
Pos	Team	Pld	W	D	L	GF	GA	GD	Pts	Qualification
1	United States (H)	3	3	0	0	12	1	+11	9	Knockout stage
2	Canada	3	2	0	1	6	2	+4	6	Knockout stage
3	Costa Rica	3	1	0	2	5	7	−2	3	
4	Trinidad and Tobago	3	0	0	3	0	13	−13	0	

Source: CONCACAF
Rules for classification: Tiebreakers
(H) Hosts
13 August 2017
09:00

United States	2–0	Canada
Busio 34', 35'	Report

IMG Academy, Bradenton
13 August 2017
11:00

Costa Rica	4–0	Trinidad and Tobago
Ugalde 16'; Céspedes 40'; Castro 45'; Valentine 60'	Report

IMG Academy, Bradenton

14 August 2017
09:00

Canada	3–0	Costa Rica
Henry 44'; Radivojsa 51'; Rea 53'	Report

IMG Academy, Bradenton
14 August 2017
11:00

Trinidad and Tobago	0–6	United States
	Report	Reyna 3' (pen.); Ocampo-Chavez 4', 8'; Busio 39', 70'; Garcia 69'

IMG Academy, Bradenton

16 August 2017
09:00

Costa Rica	1–4	United States
Judge 53' (o.g.)	Report	Scally 20'; Castro 36' (o.g.); Gaines 43'; Judge 51'

IMG Academy, Bradenton
16 August 2017
11:00

Trinidad and Tobago	0–3	Canada
	Report	Omeonga 12', 40'; Da Silva 43'

IMG Academy, Bradenton

=== Knockout stage ===
Semi-finals
17 August 2017
Mexico	3
Canada	0
17 August 2017
United States	3
Panama	0

Final
19 August 2017
Mexico	2
United States	0

==== Semi-finals ====
17 August 2017
09:00

Mexico	3–0	Canada
Telles 25'; Gámez 37'; Ortega 52'	Report

IMG Academy, Bradenton
17 August 2017
09:00

United States	3–0	Panama
Reyna 5'; Gaines 36'; Busio 36'	Report

IMG Academy, Bradenton

==== 5th place ====
17 August 2017
11:00

Honduras	1−2	Costa Rica
Vega 28'	Report	Castro 9'; Bolaños 63'

IMG Academy, Bradenton

==== 7th place ====
17 August 2017
11:00

Jamaica	8−1	Trinidad and Tobago
Morgan 20', 44'; Atkinson 24', 27'; Campbell 42'; Wright 64', 68', 70'	Report	Mc Fee 37'

IMG Academy, Bradenton

==== Final ====
19 August 2017
11:00

Mexico	2−0	United States
Garcia 44'; Hernández 73'	Report

IMG Academy, Bradenton
Referee: Oshane Nation (Jamaica)

== Division 2 ==
=== Group stage ===
==== Group C ====
Pos	Team	Pld	W	D	L	GF	GA	GD	Pts	Qualification
1	El Salvador	3	3	0	0	6	1	+5	9	Knockout stage
2	Cuba	3	2	0	1	8	6	+2	6	
3	Bermuda	3	0	1	2	3	5	−2	1	
4	Martinique	3	0	1	2	4	9	−5	1	

Source: CONCACAF
Rules for classification: Tiebreakers
14 August 2017
09:00

Cuba	1–3	El Salvador
	Report

IMG Academy, Bradenton
14 August 2017
11:00

Bermuda	2–2	Martinique
	Report

IMG Academy, Bradenton

15 August 2017
09:00

El Salvador	1–0	Bermuda
	Report

IMG Academy, Bradenton
15 August 2017
11:00

Martinique	2–5	Cuba
	Report

IMG Academy, Bradenton

17 August 2017
09:00

Bermuda	1−2	Cuba
	Report

IMG Academy, Bradenton
17 August 2017
11:00

Martinique	0–2	El Salvador
	Report

IMG Academy, Bradenton

==== Group D ====
Pos	Team	Pld	W	D	L	GF	GA	GD	Pts	Qualification
1	Haiti	3	3	0	0	9	0	+9	9	Knockout stage
2	Dominican Republic	3	2	0	1	4	2	+2	6	
3	Nicaragua	3	1	0	2	1	4	−3	3	
4	Curaçao	3	0	0	3	0	8	−8	0	

Source: CONCACAF
Rules for classification: Tiebreakers
14 August 2017
09:00

Haiti	1–0	Nicaragua
	Report

IMG Academy, Bradenton
14 August 2017
11:00

Dominican Republic	1–0	Curaçao
	Report

IMG Academy, Bradenton

15 August 2017
09:00

Nicaragua	0–3	Dominican Republic
	Report	González ?' ? ?' ? ?'

IMG Academy, Bradenton
15 August 2017
11:00

Curaçao	0–6	Haiti
	Report

IMG Academy, Bradenton

17 August 2017
09:00

Dominican Republic	0–2	Haiti
	Report

IMG Academy, Bradenton
17 August 2017
11:00

Curaçao	0−1	Nicaragua
	Report

IMG Academy, Bradenton

==== Group E ====
Pos	Team	Pld	W	D	L	GF	GA	GD	Pts	Qualification
1	Barbados	4	3	1	0	9	3	+6	10	Knockout stage
2	Puerto Rico	4	2	1	1	11	6	+5	7	
3	Guadeloupe	4	0	0	4	3	14	−11	0	

Source: CONCACAF
Rules for classification: Tiebreakers
13 August 2017
09:00

Puerto Rico	4–1	Guadeloupe
	Report

IMG Academy, Bradenton

14 August 2017
09:00

Guadeloupe	0–2	Barbados
	Report

IMG Academy, Bradenton

15 August 2017
09:00

Barbados	2–0	Puerto Rico
	Report

IMG Academy, Bradenton

16 August 2017
09:00

Guadeloupe	1–5	Puerto Rico
	Report

IMG Academy, Bradenton

17 August 2017
09:00

Barbados	3–1	Guadeloupe
	Report

IMG Academy, Bradenton

18 August 2017
09:00

Puerto Rico	2−2	Barbados
	Report

IMG Academy, Bradenton

==== Group F ====
Pos	Team	Pld	W	D	L	GF	GA	GD	Pts	Qualification
1	Suriname	3	3	0	0	8	1	+7	9	Knockout stage
2	Guyana	3	1	1	1	3	4	−1	4	
3	Saint Kitts and Nevis	3	0	2	1	3	7	−4	2	
4	Saint Lucia	3	0	1	2	2	4	−2	1	

Source: CONCACAF
Rules for classification: Tiebreakers
14 August 2017
09:00

Saint Lucia	0−1	Suriname
	Report

IMG Academy, Bradenton
14 August 2017
11:00

Guyana	1−1	Saint Kitts and Nevis
	Report

IMG Academy, Bradenton

15 August 2017
09:00

Suriname	3−1	Guyana
	Report

IMG Academy, Bradenton
15 August 2017
11:00

Saint Kitts and Nevis	2−2	Saint Lucia
	Report

IMG Academy, Bradenton

17 August 2017
09:00

Guyana	1−0	Saint Lucia
	Report

IMG Academy, Bradenton
17 August 2017
11:00

Saint Kitts and Nevis	0−4	Suriname
	Report

IMG Academy, Bradenton

=== Knockout stage ===
==== 1st to 4th place ====
Winners promoted to Division 1 (this is not confirmed by CONCACAF).

19 August 2017
09:00

El Salvador	1–3	Haiti
	Report

IMG Academy, Bradenton
19 August 2017
09:00

Barbados	1–1	Suriname
	Report
Penalties
	2–1

IMG Academy, Bradenton

==== 5th to 8th place ====
19 August 2017
11:00

Cuba	0–0	Dominican Republic
	Report
Penalties
	4–3

IMG Academy, Bradenton
19 August 2017
11:00

Puerto Rico	1–1	Guyana
	Report
Penalties
	6–5

IMG Academy, Bradenton

==== 9th to 12th place ====
19 August 2017
09:00

Bermuda	1–3	Nicaragua
	Report

IMG Academy, Bradenton
19 August 2017
11:00

Guadeloupe	3–0	Saint Kitts and Nevis
	Report

IMG Academy, Bradenton

==== 13th to 15th place ====
19 August 2017
09:00

Martinique	1–3	Curaçao
	Report

IMG Academy, Bradenton

== Division 3 ==
=== Group stage ===
==== Group G ====
Pos	Team	Pld	W	D	L	GF	GA	GD	Pts	Qualification
1	Cayman Islands	3	3	0	0	10	3	+7	9	Knockout stage
2	Aruba	3	2	0	1	7	5	+2	6	
3	Bonaire	3	1	0	2	3	5	−2	3	
4	Saint Martin	3	0	0	3	3	10	−7	0	

Source: CONCACAF
Rules for classification: Tiebreakers
13 August 2017
09:00

Aruba	2−3	Cayman Islands
	Report

IMG Academy, Bradenton
13 August 2017
11:00

Bonaire	2−1	Saint Martin
	Report

IMG Academy, Bradenton

15 August 2017
09:00

Cayman Islands	3−1	Bonaire
	Report

IMG Academy, Bradenton
15 August 2017
11:00

Saint Martin	2−4	Aruba
	Report

IMG Academy, Bradenton

16 August 2017
09:00

Bonaire	0−1	Aruba
	Report

IMG Academy, Bradenton
16 August 2017
11:00

Saint Martin	0−4	Cayman Islands
	Report

IMG Academy, Bradenton

==== Group H ====
Pos	Team	Pld	W	D	L	GF	GA	GD	Pts	Qualification
1	Antigua and Barbuda	3	3	0	0	8	0	+8	9	Knockout stage
2	Grenada	3	1	1	1	4	7	−3	4	
3	Sint Maarten	3	1	0	2	1	4	−3	3	
4	Dominica	3	0	1	2	2	4	−2	1	

Source: CONCACAF
Rules for classification: Tiebreakers
13 August 2017
09:00

Antigua and Barbuda	5−0	Grenada
	Report

IMG Academy, Bradenton
13 August 2017
11:00

Dominica	0−1	Sint Maarten
	Report

IMG Academy, Bradenton

15 August 2017
09:00

Grenada	2−2	Dominica
	Report

IMG Academy, Bradenton
15 August 2017
11:00

Sint Maarten	0−2	Antigua and Barbuda
	Report

IMG Academy, Bradenton

16 August 2017
09:00

Dominica	0−1	Antigua and Barbuda
	Report

IMG Academy, Bradenton
16 August 2017
11:00

Sint Maarten	0−2	Grenada
	Report

IMG Academy, Bradenton

==== Group I ====
Pos	Team	Pld	W	D	L	GF	GA	GD	Pts	Qualification
1	French Guiana	3	2	0	1	11	4	+7	6	Knockout stage
2	U.S. Virgin Islands	3	2	0	1	9	6	+3	6	
3	Saint Vincent and the Grenadines	3	2	0	1	5	4	+1	6	
4	Bahamas	3	0	0	3	1	13	−12	0	

Source: CONCACAF
Rules for classification: Tiebreakers
13 August 2017
09:00

Bahamas	1−5	U.S. Virgin Islands
	Report

IMG Academy, Bradenton
13 August 2017
11:00

French Guiana	2−1	Saint Vincent and the Grenadines
	Report

IMG Academy, Bradenton

15 August 2017
09:00

U.S. Virgin Islands	3−2	French Guiana
	Report

IMG Academy, Bradenton
15 August 2017
11:00

Saint Vincent and the Grenadines	1−0	Bahamas
	Report

IMG Academy, Bradenton

16 August 2017
09:00

French Guiana	7−0	Bahamas
	Report

IMG Academy, Bradenton
16 August 2017
11:00

Saint Vincent and the Grenadines	3−1	U.S. Virgin Islands
	Report

IMG Academy, Bradenton

==== Group J ====
Pos	Team	Pld	W	D	L	GF	GA	GD	Pts	Qualification
1	British Virgin Islands	3	3	0	0	19	5	+14	9	Knockout stage
2	Anguilla	3	2	0	1	4	5	−1	6	
3	Montserrat	3	1	0	2	5	9	−4	3	
4	Turks and Caicos Islands	3	0	0	3	4	13	−9	0	

Source: CONCACAF
Rules for classification: Tiebreakers
13 August 2017
09:00

British Virgin Islands	4−0	Anguilla
	Report

IMG Academy, Bradenton
13 August 2017
11:00

Montserrat	3−0	Turks and Caicos Islands
	Report

IMG Academy, Bradenton

15 August 2017
09:00

Anguilla	1−0	Montserrat
	Report

IMG Academy, Bradenton
15 August 2017
11:00

Turks and Caicos Islands	3−7	British Virgin Islands
	Report

IMG Academy, Bradenton

16 August 2017
09:00

Montserrat	2−8	British Virgin Islands
	Report

IMG Academy, Bradenton
16 August 2017
11:00

Turks and Caicos Islands	1−3	Anguilla
	Report

IMG Academy, Bradenton

=== Knockout stage ===
==== 1st to 4th place ====
Winners promoted to Division 2 (this is not confirmed by CONCACAF).

18 August 2017
09:00

Cayman Islands	2−0	Antigua and Barbuda
	Report

IMG Academy, Bradenton
18 August 2017
09:00

French Guiana	6−0	British Virgin Islands
	Report

IMG Academy, Bradenton

==== 5th to 8th place ====
18 August 2017
11:00

Aruba	0−4	Grenada
	Report

IMG Academy, Bradenton
18 August 2017
11:00

U.S. Virgin Islands	2−1	Anguilla
	Report

IMG Academy, Bradenton

==== 9th to 12th place ====
18 August 2017
09:00

Bonaire	4−1	Sint Maarten
	Report

IMG Academy, Bradenton
18 August 2017
11:00

Saint Vincent and the Grenadines	5−0	Montserrat
	Report

IMG Academy, Bradenton

==== 13th to 16th place ====
18 August 2017
09:00

Saint Martin	1−2	Dominica
	Report

IMG Academy, Bradenton
18 August 2017
11:00

Bahamas	5−1	Turks and Caicos Islands
	Report

IMG Academy, Bradenton
