= Fernando Ruiz =

Fernando Ruiz may refer to:

- Fernando Ruiz de Castro (died 1377), Galician nobleman and military figure
- Fernando Ruiz de Villegas (fl. c. 1500–1536), Spanish writer
- Fernando Ruiz de Castro y Portugal (1505–1575), Spanish nobleman and mayordomo mayor
- Fernando Ruiz de Castro Andrade y Portugal (1548–1601), Spanish nobleman and viceroy of Naples
- Fernando Ruiz Correa (1899–?), Chilean politician
- Fernando Vargas Ruiz de Somocurcio (1918–2003), Peruvian bishop
- Fernando Ariztía Ruiz (1925–2003), Chilean bishop
- Fernando Ruiz (footballer), Argentine footballer

== See also ==
- Fernando Ruiz de Castro (disambiguation)
