= Cameron Gray (footballer) =

Caymanian footballer

Personal information
- Date of birth: 22 October 1998 (age 28)
- Place of birth: George Town, Cayman Islands
- Position: Defender

Team information
- Current team: Flackwell Heath

Youth career
- 2009–2012: Academy
- Reading

Senior career*
Years	Team	Apps	(Gls)
2017–	Flackwell Heath		

International career^{‡}
- Cayman Islands U15
- Cayman Islands U17
2019–	Cayman Islands	3	(0)
- * Club domestic league appearances and goals as of 28 March 2021 ‡ National team caps and goals as of 28 March 2021

Cameron Gray (born 22 October 1998) is a Caymanian footballer.

== Career statistics ==
=== International ===
As of match played 26 March 2021.

National team	Year	Apps	Goals
Cayman Islands	2019	2	0
Cayman Islands	2021	1	0
Total		3	0
