= Honduras national under-15 football team =

National association football team

Honduras U-15
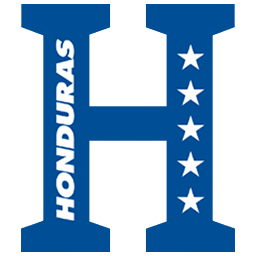
- Nickname: La H
- Association: FENAFUTH
- Confederation: CONCACAF
- FIFA code: HON
First colours	Second colours

First international
- Honduras 5–0 Saint Martin (14 August 2013 in Cayman Islands)

Biggest win
- Honduras 6–0 Saint Kitts and Nevis (17 August 2013 in Cayman Islands)

Biggest defeat
- Honduras 0–5 Mexico (13 August 2017 in United States)

CONCACAF Under-15 Championship
- Appearances: 2 (first in 2013)
- Best result: Winners, 2013

The Honduras national U-15 football team represents Honduras in tournaments and friendly matches at the Under-15 level. They have won the CONCACAF Under-15 Championship once in 2013.

== Tournament History ==
=== FIFA U-15 World Cup & Festival ===
FIFA U-15 World Cup & Festival record
Year	Round	Position	Pld	W	D*	L	GF	GA
(Azerbaijan) 2026	Qualified							
Total		1/1						

=== CONCACAF Under-15 Championship ===
CONCACAF Under-15 Championship
Year	P	W	T	L	F	A	D	Pts	Finish
(Cayman Islands) 2013	6	6	0	0	22	2	+20	18	Winners
(United States) 2017	4	1	0	3	6	11	−5	3	6th
Totals	10	7	0	3	28	13	+15	21	—

== Record v other nations ==
As of 17 August 2017
Includes data from CONCACAF Under-15 Championship only

Opponent	Record	Goals
Costa Rica	0–0–1	1:2
Curaçao	1–0–0	5:0
El Salvador	1–0–0	2:1
Guadeloupe	1–0–0	2:0
Guatemala	1–0–0	2:1
Jamaica	1–0–0	5:0
Mexico	0–0–1	0:5
Panama	0–0–1	0:4
Saint Kitts and Nevis	1–0–0	6:0
Saint Martin	1–0–0	5:0
Totals	7–0–3	28:13

== Honours ==
- CONCACAF Under-15 Championship
  - Winners (1): 2013
