= 2025 CONCACAF Boys' Under-15 Championship =

Campeonato de Niños Sub-15 CONCACAF 2025

Tournament details
- Host country: Aruba; Costa Rica; Curaçao
- Cities: Oranjestad; Alajuela; Willemstad
- Dates: 2–10 August
- Teams: 39 (from 2 confederations)
- Venues: 3 (in 3 host cities)

Final positions
- Champions: Mexico (2nd title)
- Runners-up: United States
- Third place: Costa Rica
- Fourth place: Panama

The 2025 CONCACAF Boys' Under-15 Championship (Spanish: Campeonato de Niños Sub-15 CONCACAF 2025) was the fifth edition of the CONCACAF Boys' Under-15 Championship, the biennial international youth football tournament organized by CONCACAF for the men's under-15 national teams of North, Central America and Caribbean. It was held in Aruba, Costa Rica and Curaçao from 2 to 10 August 2025.

Mexico won the League A portion of the competition, defeating the United States, who were the defending champion coming into the tournament.

== Teams ==
A total of 39 teams entered the tournament, 38 out of the 41 CONCACAF member national teams and one invited team from the Asian Football Confederation (AFC), Saudi Arabia. Haiti was originally scheduled to participate, but did not.

Like previous editions, the teams were split into three divisions, named League A (with 9 teams), League B (with 16 teams) and League C (with 14 teams), according to the CONCACAF Men's Under-17 Ranking as of February 2025, with the invited team being included within League A.

League A (9 teams)
Rank	Team	Prv	Pts
1	Mexico		5,264
2	United States		4,777
3	Canada		3,408
4	Panama		2,577
5	Honduras		2,161
6	Costa Rica		2,133
7	El Salvador		1,727
8	Nicaragua	▲	1,464
N/R	Saudi Arabia (invited from AFC)	—	—

League B (16 teams)
Rank	Team	Prv	Pts
9	Puerto Rico	▼	1,376
10	Jamaica	▼	1,243
11	Bermuda		1,187
12	Dominican Republic	▼	1,170
13	Guatemala	▼	1,133
14	Trinidad and Tobago	▼	1,108
15	Curaçao		1,081
16	Cuba	▼	1,013
17	Guyana		955
18	Aruba		893
19	Barbados		747
20	British Virgin Islands	▲	693
21	Saint Kitts and Nevis		683
22	Antigua and Barbuda		678
23	Belize		606
24	Cayman Islands		519

League C (14 teams)
Rank	Team	Prv	Pts
25	Martinique	▼	515
26	Bahamas		480
27	Saint Martin		472
28	Suriname	▼	459
29	Anguilla		388
30	Turks and Caicos Islands		338
31	Saint Vincent and the Grenadines		332
32	Grenada	▼	328
33	Saint Lucia	▼	291
34	Dominica		276
35	U.S. Virgin Islands		208
36	Sint Maarten		104
37	Bonaire		92
38	French Guiana		0

The groups and match schedule were unveiled on 29 July 2025.

League A

Group A
Pos	Team
A1	Mexico
A2	Panama
A3	Honduras
A4	El Salvador
A5	Nicaragua

Group B
Pos	Team
B1	United States
B2	Canada
B3	Costa Rica
B4	Saudi Arabia

League B

Group C
Pos	Team
C1	Puerto Rico
C2	Cuba
C3	Guyana
C4	Cayman Islands

Group D
Pos	Team
D1	Jamaica
D2	Curaçao
D3	Aruba
D4	Belize

Group E
Pos	Team
E1	Bermuda
E2	Trinidad and Tobago
E3	Barbados
E4	Antigua and Barbuda

Group F
Pos	Team
F1	Dominican Republic
F2	Guatemala
F3	British Virgin Islands
F4	Saint Kitts and Nevis

League C

Group G
Pos	Team
G1	Martinique
G2	Grenada
G3	Saint Lucia
G4	French Guiana

Group H
Pos	Team
H1	Bahamas
H2	Saint Vincent and the Grenadines
H3	Dominica
H4	Bonaire

Group I
Pos	Team
I1	Saint Martin
I2	Turks and Caicos Islands
I3	U.S. Virgin Islands

Group J
Pos	Team
J1	Suriname
J2	Anguilla
J3	Sint Maarten

== Format ==
In League A, the 8 teams were divided into two groups (A and B), one of five teams and one of four teams, with each group played on a single round-robin basis. The top two teams of each group advanced to the semi-finals, with the winners of the semi-finals playing in the final, while the losers played the third-place match. The four teams that did not advance to the semi-finals were paired, based on their results in the group stage, to play in a play-offs round to determine their final place in the tournament.

In League 2, the 16 teams are also divided into four groups (C to F) of four and the same competition format as in League A was used.

In Division 3, the 14 teams are divided into four groups (G to J), two of three teams and two of four team, and followed the same competition format as in League A and B.

Each match was to last 70 minutes, comprising two periods of 35 minutes with a half-time interval of 10 minutes in between. If a game in the semi-finals or a third-place match of each league were tied at the end of regulation time, the winner would be decided directly by a penalty shoot-out. If the final match of each league were tied at the end of regulation time an extra time of two 10 minute periods would be played, if the score was still tied at the end of overtime, the match would be decided by a penalty shoot-out.

=== Tiebreakers ===
The following tiebreaking criteria were established by CONCACAF:

1. Greatest number of points obtained in all group matches
2. Goal difference in all group matches
3. Greatest number of goals scored in all group matches
4. Greatest number of points obtained in matches amongst teams still tied
5. Goal difference in matches amongst teams still tied (if more than two teams are equal on points)
6. Greatest number of goals scored in matches amongst teams still tied (if more than two teams are equal on points)
7. Lowest disciplinary record
8. Latest CONCACAF Under-17 Ranking

== League A ==
All match times are in local time (AST (UTC−4)), as listed by CONCACAF.

=== Group stage ===
==== Group A ====
Pos	Team	Pld	W	D	L	GF	GA	GD	Pts	Qualification
1	Mexico	4	3	0	1	17	3	+14	9	Advance to Semi-finals
2	Panama	4	3	0	1	11	4	+7	9	Advance to Semi-finals
3	Honduras	4	3	0	1	4	2	+2	9	Advance to Play-offs round
4	El Salvador	4	0	1	3	2	9	−7	1	Advance to Play-offs round
5	Nicaragua	4	0	1	3	0	16	−16	1	Advance to Play-offs round

Source: CONCACAF
Rules for classification: Tiebreakers
2 August 2025
9:00

El Salvador	0–0	Nicaragua
	Report

FCRF Federation Field #1, Alajuela
2 August 2025
11:00

Panama	1–2	Honduras
Alfredo Maduro 30'	Report	Hendry Ciguenza 15'; Said Canales 23'

FCRF Federation Field #1, Alajuela

3 August 2025
9:00

Panama	4–2	El Salvador
Jasio Jordan 12'; Mauro Ortega 24'; Alfredo Maduro 48'; Steven Moreno 67'	Report	Franco Herrera 65'; Jayson Ramírez 70'

FCRF Federation Field #1, Alajuela
3 August 2025
11:00

Nicaragua	0–9	Mexico
	Report	Matthew Arana 9', 22'; Da’vian Kimbrough 14'; Dylan Reyes 16'; Gael Aguilar 41'; Patricio Silva 53'; Axel Sandoval 55'; Juan Carlos Martínez Jr. 59', 70+2'

FCRF Federation Field #1, Alajuela

5 August 2025
9:00

Honduras	3–0	Nicaragua
Jostin Castillo 35+1'; Jean Rubí 39'; Alejandro Guifarro 65'	Report

FCRF Federation Field #1, Alajuela
5 August 2025
11:00

Mexico	4–0	El Salvador
Robert Oliveras 12'; Patricio Silva 31'; Da’vian Kimbrough 62'; Matthew Arana 70+1'	Report

FCRF Federation Field #1, Alajuela

6 August 2025
11:00

Nicaragua	0–4	Panama
	Report	Alfredo Maduro; Neir Marrugo; José Pierre

FCRF Federation Field #1, Alajuela
6 August 2025
11:00

Honduras	0–2	Mexico
	Report	Paxon Ruffin; Da’vian Kimbrough

FCRF Federation Field #1, Alajuela

7 August 2025
11:00

El Salvador	0–1	Honduras
	Report	Elias Banegas 45'

FCRF Federation Field #1, Alajuela
7 August 2025
11:00

Mexico	2–3	Panama
Juan Carlos Martínez Jr. 23'; Da’vian Kimbrough 70+1'	Report	Alfredo Maduro 4', 14'; Alexander Tull 11'

FCRF Federation Field #1, Alajuela

==== Group B ====
Pos	Team	Pld	W	D	L	GF	GA	GD	Pts	Qualification
1	United States	3	2	0	1	5	3	+2	6	Advance to Semi-finals
2	Costa Rica (H)	3	2	0	1	3	3	0	6	Advance to Semi-finals
3	Saudi Arabia (G)	3	1	1	1	2	2	0	4	Advance to Play-offs round
4	Canada	3	0	1	2	1	3	−2	1	Advance to Play-offs round

Source: CONCACAF
Rules for classification: Tiebreakers
(G) Guests; (H) Hosts
4 August 2025
9:00

United States	2–0	Saudi Arabia
Ikenna Chidebe 11'; Vicente Garcia 45'	Report

FCRF Federation Field #2, Alajuela
Referee: Richard Tejada (Panama)
4 August 2025
11:00

Canada	0–1	Costa Rica
	Report	Bryan Alvarado 69'

FCRF Federation Field #2, Alajuela

6 August 2025
9:00

Saudi Arabia	0–0	Canada
	Report

FCRF Federation Field #2, Alajuela
6 August 2025
11:00

Costa Rica	2–1	United States
Caleb Flores 6'; Jefrey Urbina 16'	Report	Ikenna Chidebe 38'

FCRF Federation Field #2, Alajuela
Attendance: 50
Referee: Cesar Nolasco (El Salvador)

7 August 2025
9:00

United States	2–1	Canada
Liam Stribling 5'; Timoni Gbalajobi 18'	Report	Alexander Romanov 34' (pen.)

FCRF Federation Field #2, Alajuela
Attendance: 50
Referee: Julio Guity (Honduras)
7 August 2025
11:00

Costa Rica	0–2	Saudi Arabia
	Report	Yazan Alabdurabalnbi 31', 37'

FCRF Federation Field #2, Alajuela

=== Knockout stage ===
==== Bracket ====
Semi-finals
9 August 2025
Mexico	2
Costa Rica	1
9 August 2025
Panama	2 (5)
United States	2 (6)

Final
10 August 2025
Mexico	5
United States	0
Third place
10 August 2025
Costa Rica	3 (4)
Panama	3 (2)

==== Semi-finals ====
9 August 2025
9:00

Mexico	2–1	Costa Rica
Da’vian Kimbrough 10'; Paxon Ruffin 23'	Report	Ismael López 52' (pen.)

FCRF Federation Field #2, Alajuela
9 August 2025
11:00

Panama	2–2	United States
Jasio Jordan 1'; Mauro Ortega 34'	Report	Niccolo Vafiades 14', 17'
Penalties
Tull (penalty scored); Maduro (penalty scored); Rodriguez (penalty scored); Moreno (penalty scored); Munoz (penalty missed); Mendoza (penalty scored); Marrugo (penalty missed)	5–6	Garcia (penalty scored); Hernandez (penalty scored); Alexander–Munoz (penalty scored); Tchoumba (penalty scored); Turdean (penalty missed); McCraney (penalty scored); Gbalajobi (penalty scored)

FCRF Federation Field #2, Alajuela
Attendance: 50
Referee: Charlize Hood (Trinidad & Tobago)

==== Third place match ====
10 August 2025
9:00

Costa Rica	3–3	Panama
Ismael López 7'; Sebastián Cantón 17'; Jefrey Urbina 18'; Kendall Alegría (red card) 35+5'	Report	Neir Marrugo 24'; Emanuel Rodríguez 31'; José Preciado 52'
Penalties
	4–2

FCRF Federation Field #2, Alajuela

==== Final ====
10 August 2025
11:00

Mexico	5–0	United States
Juan Carlos Martínez Jr. 16', 24'; Paxon Ruffin 20'; Da’vian Kimbrough 22'; Lisandro Torres 65'	Report

FCRF Federation Field #2, Alajuela

==== Playoffs round ====
Teams that did not advance to the semi-finals were seeded based on their group stage results in order to establish the matchups for the playoffs round.

Pos	Grp	Team	Pld	W	D	L	GF	GA	GD	Pts	Playoffs round
1	A	Honduras	4	3	0	1	4	2	+2	9	Playoff 1
2	B	Saudi Arabia (G)	3	1	1	1	2	2	0	4	Playoff 1
3	B	Canada	3	0	1	2	1	3	−2	1	Playoff 2
4	A	El Salvador	4	0	1	3	2	9	−7	1	Playoff 2
5	A	Nicaragua	4	0	1	3	0	16	−16	1	Playoff 3

Source: CONCACAF
Rules for classification: Tiebreakers
(G) Guests
9 August 2025
9:00

Honduras	1–3	Saudi Arabia
Jean Rubí 2'	Report	Tamim Al Khaldi 24' (pen.); Yazan Alabdurabalnbi 54'; Meshari Alshahrani 57'

FCRF Federation Field #1, Alajuela
9 August 2025
11:00

Canada	3–0	El Salvador
John Alexis 20'; Hunter MacGowan 27'; Ethan Reid 66'	Report

FCRF Federation Field #1, Alajuela
