= Benjamin Flowers =

American architecture scholar

- Title: Professor and Associate Director
- Board member of: International Association for Sports and Leisure Facilities

Academic background
- Education: Wesleyan University (BA, 1996); University of Minnesota (PhD, 2003)

Academic work
- Discipline: Architecture, urban development
- Sub-discipline: Sport architecture, skyscrapers, political economy of architecture
- Institutions: Ohio State University, Georgia Institute of Technology

Benjamin Flowers is an American architecture scholar, author, and academic administrator. He is professor and former associate director at The Ohio State University's Knowlton School. His work focuses on the intersections of architecture, politics, and urban development, particularly within the context of sports stadiums and skyscrapers. Flowers is a member of the executive board of the International Association for Sports and Leisure Facilities (IAKS).

== Early life and education ==
Flowers earned a Bachelor of Arts from Wesleyan University (1996) and a Doctor of Philosophy from the University of Minnesota (2003).

== Career ==
Flowers began his career as a technical information specialist at the Library of Congress (2004–2005).

In 2005, Flowers joined the Georgia Institute of Technology's School of Architecture as an assistant professor. He was promoted to associate professor with tenure in 2011 and a full professor in 2017. He received the College of Design's Georgia Power Professor of Excellence Award (2012) and the School of Architecture's Dean William Fash Teaching Excellence Award (2017). During his time at Georgia Tech, he served as director of Stadia Lab (2014–2019), director of undergraduate studies (2013–2014), was part of the second cohort of the Emerging Leaders Program at Georgia Tech (2017), a Provost's Teaching and Learning Fellow in the College of Design (2018), and associate vice provost for advocacy and conflict resolution (2018–2019).

In 2019, Flowers joined The Ohio State University as a full professor at the Knowlton School and later as associate director in 2020–2024. In 2021, he was elected to the executive board of the International Association for Sports and Leisure Facilities. He has appeared on several episodes of National Geographic’s Superstructures: Engineering Marvels (2019, 2020). Flowers’ research on skyscrapers and stadiums has been featured in major news outlets in the US and UK.

In 2019, Flowers was part of the First Skyscrapers Symposium, Steering Committee.

Flowers has also consulted for firms including Populous and CBRE and served as an expert witness on architectural cases involving stadium design.

== Awards ==
- Outstanding Academic Title Award from Choice Magazine for Skyscraper (2010)
- Propmondo's 50 Greatest Commercial Real Estate Books of All Time (2024)

== Books ==
=== Authored ===
- Flowers, Benjamin Sitton (2018). Beautiful Moves: Designing Stadia. London: Lund Humphries. ISBN 978-1-84822-224-3.
- Flowers, Benjamin Sitton (2017). Sport and Architecture. Routledge. ISBN 978-1-315-79836-3.
- Flowers, Benjamin (2009). Skyscraper: The Politics and Power of Building New York City in the Twentieth Century. Philadelphia: University of Pennsylvania Press. ISBN 978-0-8122-4184-6.

=== Edited ===
- Flowers, Benjamin, ed. (2014). Architecture in an Age of Uncertainty. Burlington: Ashgate. ISBN 978-1-4094-4575-3.
