= Santiago Cortés =

Santiago Cortés may refer to:\

- Santiago Cortés (botanist) (1854–1924), see Elaeis
- Santiago Cortés (footballer)
- Santiago Cortés (musician)
- Santiago Cortés Sandoval (born 1944), Mexican politician
