= Puerto Rico national under-15 football team =

Association football team from Puerto Rico

Puerto Rico
- Nickname(s): El Huracán Azul (The Blue Hurricane); Los Boricuas (The Boricuas)
- Association: Federación Puertorriqueña de Fútbol (FPF)
- Confederation: CONCACAF (North America)
- Sub-confederation: CFU (Caribbean)
- Head coach: Pablo Almagro
First colors	Second colors

First international
- Martinique 1–2 Puerto Rico (George Town, Cayman Islands; August 14, 2013)

Biggest win
- Puerto Rico 6–0 Saint Vincent and the Grenadines (George Town, Cayman Islands; August 17, 2013)

Biggest defeat
- Barbados 2–0 Puerto Rico (Bradenton, Florida; August 15, 2017)

The Puerto Rico national under-15 football team represents Puerto Rico in the CONCACAF Boys Under-15 Championship.

== History ==
=== 2013 ===
Puerto Rico made its first appearance in the first CONCACAF Under-15 Championship in 2013. The team was managed by Jeaustin Campos. They could not advance from the first round after 3 wins and 2 defeats.

=== 2017 ===
The team returned to the field in 2017 with Carlos Cantarero as head coach. They played two friendlies against United States Virgin Islands before heading to the CONCACAF Championship played in Bradenton, Florida.

They could not advance the first round after losing their crucial match against Barbados. The team finished the tournament with a win against Guyana.

== Tournament results ==
=== FIFA U-15 World Cup & Festival ===
- 2026 – 136th

== Results and fixtures ==
The following is a list of match results in the last 12 months, as well as any future matches that have been scheduled.

Legend

Win Draw Loss Fixture Cancelled

== Current squad ==
The following players were selected for the CFU 2020 Boys' U-14 Challenge Series

No.	Pos.	Player	Date of birth (age)	Caps	Goals	Club

== Head coaches ==
- 2013 – (Costa Rica) Jeaustin Campos
- 2017 – (Spain) Carlos García Cantarero
- 2021 – (Argentina) Pablo Almagro
