= 2013 CONCACAF Under-15 Championship =

Tournament details
- Host country: Cayman Islands
- City: George Town
- Dates: 13–25 August
- Teams: 22 (from 1 confederation)
- Venue: 3

Final positions
- Champions: Honduras (1st title)
- Runners-up: Guatemala
- Third place: El Salvador
- Fourth place: Bermuda

Tournament statistics
- Matches played: 19
- Goals scored: 90 (4.74 per match)
- Top scorer: (Cayman Islands) Leighton Thomas Jr. (11 goals)
- Best player: (Honduras) Darixon Vuelto
- Best goalkeeper: (Honduras) Wilmer Martinez
- Fair play award: Bermuda

The CONCACAF Under-15 Championship was a scheduled a youth association football competition, the first edition of the CONCACAF Under-15 Championship. It took place 13–25 August 2013. The competition was hosted on Grand Cayman Island.

Each match lasted 70 minutes.

== Participants ==
- Antigua and Barbuda
- Aruba
- Bahamas
- Belize
- Bermuda
- Cayman Islands
- Curaçao
- El Salvador
- Grenada
- Guadeloupe
- Guatemala
- Haiti
- Honduras
- Jamaica
- Martinique
- Puerto Rico
- Saint Kitts and Nevis
- Saint Lucia
- Saint Martin
- Sint Maarten
- Saint Vincent and the Grenadines
- U.S. Virgin Islands

== Venues ==
West Bay	George Town	
Ed Bush Field	The Annex	Truman Bodden Sports Complex
19.381044°N 81.398785°W	19.298683°N 81.376764°W	19.278433°N 81.382932°W
2013 CONCACAF Under-15 Championship (Cayman Islands)

== Group stage ==
=== Tiebreakers ===
The following tiebreaking criteria were established by CONCACAF:

1. Greatest number of points obtained in all group matches
2. Goal difference in all group matches
3. Greatest number of goals scored in all group matches
4. Greatest number of points obtained in matches amongst teams still tied
5. Lots drawn by the Gold Cup Organizing Committee

=== Group A ===
Pos	Team	Pld	W	D	L	GF	GA	GD	Pts	Qualification
1	Bermuda	5	5	0	0	20	1	+19	15	Knockout stage
2	Cayman Islands (H)	5	4	0	1	27	6	+21	12	
3	Aruba	5	3	0	2	23	7	+16	9	
4	Bahamas	5	1	1	3	11	10	+1	4	
5	U.S. Virgin Islands	5	1	1	3	5	30	−25	4	
6	Sint Maarten	5	0	0	5	2	34	−32	0	

Source: CONCACAF
Rules for classification: Tiebreakers
(H) Hosts
13 August 2013
16:30
Match 1

U.S. Virgin Islands	0–8	Bermuda
	Report	Ahria Simons 18', 29'; Rashuan Simon 20' (o.g.); Oneko Lowe 35', 56'; Jai Z. Smith Deshields 24'; Knori Scott 47'; Osagi Bascome 70'

The Annex (Stadium, Georgetown), Georgetown
Referee: Kerry Skeeple (Antigua)
13 August 2013
19:30
Match 4

Cayman Islands	12–0	Sint Maarten
Leighton Thomas Jr. 1', 16', 21', 24', 36'; Cameron Gray 10'; Scott 13'; Martinez 34', 57'; Kray Foster 58'; Elijah Seymour 62'; Joshua McKenzie 64'	Report

Truman Bodden Sports Complex, Georgetown
Referee: Walter Cid Rodriquez (Dominican Republic)
13 August 2013
19:30
Match 5

Aruba	4–0	Bahamas
Jean Pierre van der Linden 1'; Denrick Lopez 3', 51'; Oscar Garcia Arias 23'	Report

Ed Bush Field, West Bay
Attendance: unknown
15 August 2013
15:00
Match 10

Aruba	6–0	Sint Maarten
Jean Pierre van der Linden 7', 48'; Ryan Illes 14', 66'; Oscar Garcia Arias 38'; Jason Fontalvo 73'	Report

Truman Bodden Sports Complex, Georgetown
15 August 2013
16:30
Match 13

Bahamas	0–1	Bermuda
	Report	Osagi Bascome 26'

Ed Bush Field, West Bay
15 August 2013
19:30
Match 17

Cayman Islands	8–0	U.S. Virgin Islands
Leighton Thomas Jr. 4', 6', 9'; Ryen Jackson 13'; Dante Ramoon 20'; Elijah Seymour 24'; Cameron Gray 30'; Jordan McLean 62'	Report

Truman Bodden Sports Complex, Georgetown
16 August 2013
16:30
Match 20

Aruba	10–0	U.S. Virgin Islands
Jean Pierre van der Linden 5', 22', 42', 44', 48', 60'; Akeem Charles 7'; Christopher Leung 29'; Ethan Calister 46'; Christopher Jansen 55'	Report

Truman Bodden Sports Complex, Georgetown
16 August 2013
16:30
Match 21

Bahamas	8–0	Sint Maarten
Antonio Hanna 12'; Keegan Bischof 30'; Nicholas Plakaris 44'; Omri Williams 51'; Ethan Willie 62', 66'; Terry J. Mosko 65'; Keshawn Edwards 68'	Report

The Annex (Stadium, Georgetown), Georgetown
16 August 2013
19:30
Match 24

Cayman Islands	0–3	Bermuda
	Report	Oneko Lowe 36'; Osagi Bascome 37'; Jai Z. Smith Deshields 42'

Truman Bodden Sports Complex, Georgetown
Referee: Jason Colina (Aruba)
18 August 2013
16:30
Match 37

Aruba	1–3	Bermuda
Ryan Illes 39'	Report	Amar Lewis 7'; Jai Z. Smith Deshields 10', 36'

18 August 2013
16:30
Match 38

Sint Maarten	2–3	U.S. Virgin Islands
Brandon Potmis 9'; Yannick Dinane 58'	Report	James Cook 23' (o.g.); Kumar Serrant 34'; Reno Brooks 55'

18 August 2013
19:30
Match 41

Cayman Islands	3–1	Bahamas
Zachary Scott 11'; Leighton Thomas Jr. 16'; Ramon S. Martinez 31'	Report	Re'john Ene 64'

20 August 2013
16:30
Match 49

Bahamas	2–2	U.S. Virgin Islands
Terry J. Mosko 37'; Omri Williams 70'	Report	Grant Farrell 28'; Dante Nicholas 72'

20 August 2013
18:00
Match 52

Sint Maarten	0–5	Bermuda
	Report	Travis Boyles 6'; Judah Chapman 27'; Aaron Burgess 37'; Knori Scott 53'; Oneko Lowe 55'

20 August 2013
19:30
Match 53

Cayman Islands	4–2	Aruba
Leighton Thomas Jr. 6', 9', 52'; Ryan Jackson 44'	Report	Denrick Lopez 36'; Jean Pierre van der Linden 46'

=== Group B ===
Pos	Team	Pld	W	D	L	GF	GA	GD	Pts	Qualification
1	Guatemala	4	4	0	0	12	1	+11	12	Knockout stage
2	Belize	4	3	0	1	10	3	+7	9	
3	Jamaica	4	2	0	2	7	4	+3	6	
4	Grenada	4	1	0	3	3	15	−12	3	
5	Saint Lucia	4	0	0	4	1	10	−9	0	

Source: CONCACAF
Rules for classification: Tiebreakers
13 August 2013
16:30
Match 2

Saint Lucia	0–1	Belize
	Report	Alvin Sifontes 56'

Ed Bush Field, West Bay
Attendance: unknown
Referee: Levin Allen (Cayman Islands)
13 August 2013
18:00
Match 3

Jamaica	4–0	Grenada
Peter Cambell 37', 38'; Stephan Malcolm 63'; Justin McMaster 66'	Report

Truman Bodden Sports Complex, Georgetown
Attendance: unknown
Referee: Armando Villarreal (United States)
15 August 2013
18:00
Match 15

Jamaica	2–0	Saint Lucia
Peter Cambell 21'; Nicholas Nelson 66'	Report

Truman Bodden Sports Complex, Georgetown
15 August 2013
18:00
Match 18

Guatemala	5–0	Grenada
Esteban Gabriel 28', 35'; Francisco Spross Cifuentes 38'; Alvaro J. Velasquez 51'; Diego F. Raymundo 55'	Report

Ed Bush Field, West Bay
16 August 2013
18:00
Match 22

Jamaica	1–3	Belize
Jourdain Fletcher 64'	Report	Alvin Sifontes 5'; Randy Augustine 7'; Mark Samuels 53'

Truman Bodden Sports Complex, Georgetown
16 August 2013
18:00
Match 23

Guatemala	5–1	Saint Lucia
Esteban Velasquez 5' (28), 46'; Francisco Spross Cifuentes 17' (21)	Report	Ekiel Greenidge 54'

The Annex (Stadium, Georgetown), Georgetown
18 August 2013
18:00
Match 40

Grenada	2–0	Saint Lucia
Chelon Edgehill 14'; Rickell Charles 65'	Report

18 August 2013
19:30
Match 42

Guatemala	1–0	Belize
Francisco Spross Cifuentes 33'	Report

20 August 2013
16:30
Match 50

Grenada	1–6	Belize
Chelon Edgehill 35'	Report	Mark Samuels 5'; Randy Augustine 19', 36', 68'; Rene Leslie 30'; Alvin Sifontes 73'

20 August 2013
18:00
Match 51

Jamaica	0–1	Guatemala
	Report	Francisco Spross Cifuentes 37'

=== Group C ===
Pos	Team	Pld	W	D	L	GF	GA	GD	Pts	Qualification
1	Honduras (C)	4	4	0	0	18	0	+18	12	Knockout stage
2	Guadeloupe	4	3	0	1	13	4	+9	9	
3	Saint Kitts and Nevis	4	2	0	2	10	14	−4	6	
4	Saint Martin	4	1	0	3	6	13	−7	3	
5	Curaçao	4	0	0	4	3	19	−16	0	

Source: CONCACAF
Rules for classification: Tiebreakers
(C) Champions
14 August 2013
18:00
Match 6

Curaçao	0–6	Guadeloupe
	Report	Geordy Choisi 28'; Loic Antonides 45'; Luther Archimède 62', 64'; Lory Chouan 64'; Ludwig Francillette 68'

The Annex (Stadium, Georgetown), Georgetown
Referee: Jason Colina (Aruba)
14 August 2013
19:30
Match 8

Honduras	5–0	Saint Martin
Diylan Andrade 28'; Darixon Vuelto 36', 38'; Diego Rosales 45'; Italo Ramos 69'	Report

The Annex (Stadium, Georgetown), Georgetown
15 August 2013
15:00
Match 11

Guadeloupe	5–1	Saint Kitts and Nevis
Geordy Choisi 3'; Loic Antonides 21'; Heindrix Hebreu 55'; Ludwig Francillette 59'; Benoit Gedeon 69'	Report	Geovannie Lake 37'

The Annex (Stadium, Georgetown), Georgetown
15 August 2013
16:30
Match 14

Curaçao	1–4	Saint Martin
Dean L. Lourensz 24'	Report	Federic Reymond 5', 25', 41'; Josua Bryan 10'

The Annex (Stadium, Georgetown), Georgetown
17 August 2013
16:30
Match 32

Guadeloupe	2–1	Saint Martin
Loic Antonides 12'; Geordy Choisi 62'	Report	Federic Reymond 41'

17 August 2013
19:30
Match 35

Honduras	6–0	Saint Kitts and Nevis
Darixon Vuelto 2', 37'; Jorge Alvarez 5'; Jeancarlo Vargas 53', 61', 69'	Report

19 August 2013
16:30
Match 43

Curaçao	2–4	Saint Kitts and Nevis
Hesus Pietersz 37'; Naigel Valorian 70'	Report	Geovannie Lake 5', 21'; Yohannes Mitchum 48'; Steven Archibald 49'

19 August 2013
19:30
Match 47

Honduras	2–0	Guadeloupe
Walter Rodriguez 26'; Darixon Vuelto 50'	Report

21 August 2013
16:30
Match 55

Saint Martin	1–5	Saint Kitts and Nevis
Hugo Champion 13'	Report	Steven Archibald 1', 53'; Geovannie Lake 3'; Tyrique Francis 27'; Yohannes Mitchum 50'

21 August 2013
19:30
Match 59

Honduras	5–0	Curaçao
Italo Ramos 6', 44'; Diego Villeda 34'; Edwin Manzanares 39'; Darixon Vuelto 60'	Report

=== Group D ===
Pos	Team	Pld	W	D	L	GF	GA	GD	Pts	Qualification
1	El Salvador	5	3	2	0	12	4	+8	11	Knockout stage
2	Martinique	5	3	1	1	15	3	+12	10	
3	Haiti	5	3	1	1	9	6	+3	10	
4	Puerto Rico	5	3	0	2	14	5	+9	9	
5	Antigua and Barbuda	5	1	0	4	3	16	−13	3	
6	Saint Vincent and the Grenadines	5	0	0	5	2	21	−19	0	

Source: CONCACAF
Rules for classification: Tiebreakers
14 August 2013
18:00
Match 7

El Salvador	3–0	Antigua and Barbuda
Nestor Alfaro Torres 54'; Emerson Rodriguez Palacios 69', 72'	Report

Ed Bush Field, West Bay
14 August 2013
19:30
Match 9

Martinique	1–2	Puerto Rico
Louis A. Youri 6'	Report	Marco Arocha 12'; John Henriquez 66'

Ed Bush Field, West Bay
15 August 2013
15:00
Match 12

Antigua and Barbuda	2–1	Saint Vincent and the Grenadines
Javorn Stevens 23', 70'	Report	Tevin Davis 37'

The Annex (Stadium, Georgetown), Georgetown
15 August 2013
18:00
Match 16

Martinique	4–0	Haiti
Bryan Mont 13'; Kendrick Agot 29'; Steeven Philoces 43'; Kondjo Zebina 57'	Report

Truman Bodden Sports Complex, Georgetown
15 August 2013
19:30
Match 19

Puerto Rico	1–3	El Salvador
Marco Arocha 70'	Report	Jose Flores 5'; Gerardo Molina Ruiz 26'; Carlos Herrera Romero 68'

Ed Bush Field, West Bay
17 August 2013
18:00
Match 33

Haiti	5–1	Antigua and Barbuda
Angelo Thelusme 18'; Joseph Peguy 19'; Jeudy Johnson 53', 56'; Fils A. Thermidor 58'	Report	Javorn Stevens 65'

17 August 2013
18:00
Match 34

El Salvador	1–1	Martinique
Kevin Martinez 30'	Report	Hedson Nattes 54'

17 August 2013
19:30
Match 36

Saint Vincent and the Grenadines	0–6	Puerto Rico
	Report	John Henriquez 23', 72'; Ryan López 26', 32', 41'; Juan Camareno 62'

18 August 2013
19:30
Match 40

Saint Vincent and the Grenadines	0–2	Haiti
	Report	Angelo Thelusme 49'; Fils A. Thermidor 58'

19 August 2013
18:00
Match 45

Puerto Rico	0–1	Haiti
	Report	Tchekvoh K. Amede 40'

19 August 2013
16:30
Match 44

Martinique	2–0	Antigua and Barbuda
Hedson Nattes 11'; Bryan Mont 54'	Report

19 August 2013
18:00
Match 46

Saint Vincent and the Grenadines	1–4	El Salvador
Kaicy Peniston 69'	Report	Juan Martínez 23'; Josué Meléndez 43', 49'; Carlos Herrera Romero 64'

21 August 2013
18:00
Match 56

Martinique	7–0	Saint Vincent and the Grenadines
Andrew Sainte 21'; Kendrick Agot 34', 53'; Kondjo Zebina 36'; Stanley Lisima 47'; Hedson Nattes 63', 69'	Report

21 August 2013
18:00
Match 57

El Salvador	1–1	Haiti
Kevin Martinez 27'	Report	Pierre Denilson 33'

21 August 2013
18:00
Match 58

Antigua and Barbuda	0–5	Puerto Rico
	Report	Julio Rosado 9'; Juan Camareno 34'; Joshua Rivera 38'; John Henriquez 42'; Jeimax Osorio 70'

== Knockout stage ==
Semi-finals
23 August 2013
Bermuda	1(2)
Guatemala	1(4)
23 August 2013
Honduras	2
El Salvador	1

Final
25 August 2013
Guatemala	1
Honduras	2
Third place
25 August 2013
Bermuda	0
El Salvador	2

=== Semi-finals ===
23 August 2013
18:00
Match 61

Bermuda	1–1 (a.e.t.)	Guatemala
Jordan Lambe 32'	Report	Francisco S. Cifuentes 48'
Penalties
Osagi Bascome (penalty scored); Amar Lewis (penalty scored); Oneko Lowe (penalty missed)	2–4	Victor M. Valdez Yanes (penalty scored); Francisco S. Cifuentes (penalty scored); Diego F. Raymundo (penalty scored); Mario Rodas (penalty scored)

23 August 2013
20:00
Match 62

Honduras	2–1	El Salvador
Italo Ramos 47', 62'	Report	Josué Meléndez 60'

=== Third place playoff ===
25 August 2013
17:00
Match 63

Bermuda	0–2	El Salvador
	Report	Henry Turcios 40'; Kevin Martinez 65'

=== Finals ===
25 August 2013
19:00
Match 64

Guatemala	1–2	Honduras
Mario Rodas 24'	Report	Darixon Vuelto 6', 51'

== Player awards ==
Golden boot

- (Cayman Islands) Leighton Thomas Jr.

Golden glove

- (Honduras) Wilmer Martinez

Most valuable player

- (Honduras) Darixon Vuelto
