= International Association for Sports and Leisure Facilities =

German non-profit organization

- Abbreviation: IAKS
- Formation: 1965; 61 years ago
- Type: non-profit
- Location: Cologne, Germany
- Members: about 1000
- President: Dr. Stefan Kannewischer
- Website: www.iaks.org

The International Association for Sports and Leisure Facilities (IAKS, from its original German name, Internationaler Arbeitskreis Sportstättenbau) is a non-profit organization devoted to sports buildings and leisure centres.

The IAKS was founded in Cologne in 1965. It is the only non-profit organization concerned globally with the subject of sports facility development and has therefore been awarded the status of Recognized Organization by the International Olympic Committee (IOC).

The IAKS has about 1,000 members in a current 110 countries with seven sections worldwide. These are Germany, Japan, Latin America/Caribbean, Poland, Russia, Switzerland and Spain (status 2016).

== Activities ==
The IAKS cooperates not only with the IOC, but also with the International Paralympic Committee (IPC), SportAccord, the International Council for Sports Science and Physical Education (ICSSPE) and the International Union of Architects (UIA), Sports and Leisure Programme. It also cultivates contacts with international sports federations and National Olympic Committees and has been included by the United Nations in its list of consultative NGOs of the UN Economic and Social Council (ECOSOC).

The task of the IAKS is to create a platform for the design, construction, equipping, modernization, funding and management of sports and leisure facilities as well as to participate in the establishment of standards and guidelines in Germany and Europe. The IAKS also publishes the magazine "sb", organizes conferences and exhibitions, and sponsors an international architecture prize for exemplary sports and leisure facilities, the IOC/IAKS Award, as well as the IPC/IAKS Award.

The members and partners of the IAKS are architects, engineers, enterprises and industrial associations, sports organizations, ministries of sport, education and construction, local government, and universities and other educational establishments.

One particular purpose of the IAKS is to encourage sport on a broad scale by gathering, evaluating, passing on and, if necessary, coordinating the experience, principles and research findings obtained from the design, construction, equipping and operation of sports and leisure facilities of all kinds. In doing so, it takes account of social factors in the widest sense, e.g. architecture, technology, sports science, economics and ecology. It also supports progress in this field with research and consultations.

== Congresses ==
The IAKS has been holding the international IAKS Congress for the design, construction, modernization and management of sports and leisure facilities every two years since 1969. This Congress takes place in conjunction with the International Trade Fair for Amenity Areas, Sports and Pool Facilities (FSB) in Cologne, where global infrastructural trends, structural issues and practices are presented and discussed. The IAKS Congress enjoys the patronage of the IOC, IPC, GAISF and Germany's Federal Ministry of the Interior. Today the trade fair is called the International Trade Fair of Amenity Areas, Sports and Pool Facilities (FSB) and the IAKS Congress has developed into a permanent fixture.

The 25th IAKS Congress for the Design, Construction, Modernization and Management of Sports and Leisure Facilities is taking place in Cologne/Germany from 7 to 10 November 2016. The IAKS Congress will be concerned with the latest experience, technologies, trends and prospects in sports and leisure infrastructure.

== Seminars and Events ==
The IAKS regularly holds seminars on the following subjects: Synthetic Turf and Synthetic Sports Surfaces Ice Maker Training Artificial Ice Rink Management Conference and Pools

== Presidents ==
- Willi Weyer (1965-1985)
- Günter Heidecke (1985-1990)
- Erich Schumann (1990-1997)
- Dr. Stephan J. Holthoff-Pförtner (1997-2015)
- Dr. Stefan Kannewischer (since 2015)

== IOC/IAKS Award and IPC/IAKS AWARD ==
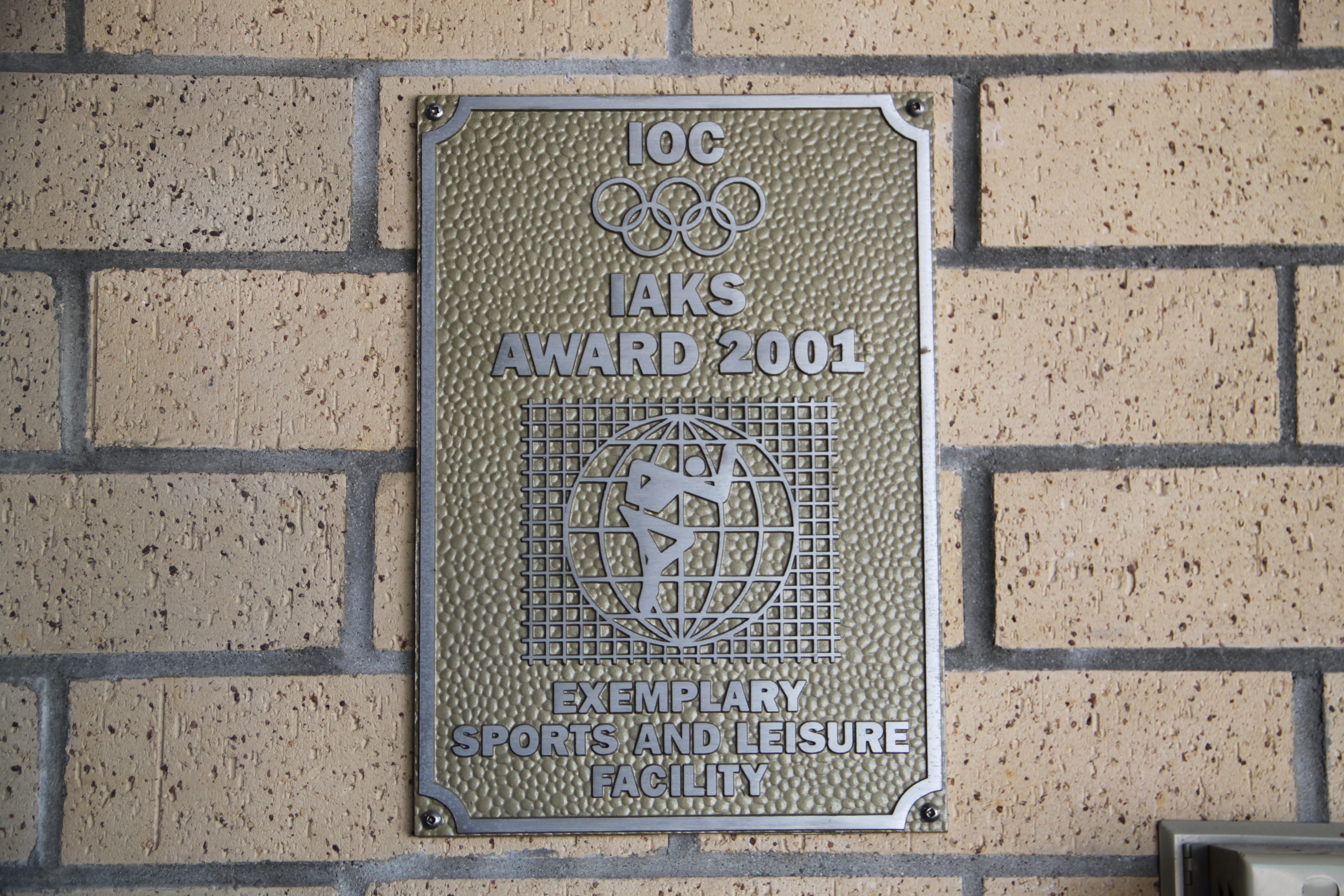
A 2001 award for the Eileen Dailly Leisure Pool & Fitness Centre in Burnaby, British Columbia, Canada

The IOC/IAKS Award is the only international architecture award for sports and leisure facilities already in successful operation.

The Award has been conferred upon exemplary well designed and also functionally outstanding sports facilities every two years since 1987. The winning facilities can be newly erected or extended or modernized existing buildings. The sponsors of the competition are the IOC and the IAKS.

Together with the IPC, the IAKS also awards the IPC/IAKS Award for sports facilities suitable for the disabled. The IPC/IAKS Award aims to promote the accessibility of sports facilities and all other buildings so that people with disabilities have the chance to practice or follow sport without restriction and without barriers.

The IOC, the IPC and the IAKS have also started the Architecture and Design Award for Students and Young Professionals on innovative designs and concepts for sports, leisure and recreational facilities.

This Award aims at young architects and designers currently studying architecture, landscape architecture, interior design and general design, and at young professionals in their first 2 years of professional practice. All participants must be under the age of 30 years.

== Publications ==
The IAKS has been publishing the international magazine "sb" since 1967. It appears every two months and reports on current industry trends in international sports and leisure facility development. In addition, the IAKS has issued planning principles for the construction of different types of sports and leisure facilities. sb is also concerned with the infrastructure of major sports events like the Olympic Games, world championships and European championships. Along with conventional sport facilities, sb also deals with special themes. Thus it is an important source of information for planners and practitioners from all areas of sports facility construction (municipalities, architects and engineers, universities, trade associations and industrial companies). sb appears in two languages: English and German. The magazine is read mainly in Germany and the rest of Europe as well as in North, Central and South America, Africa and Australia.
