= CONCACAF Boys' Under-15 Championship =

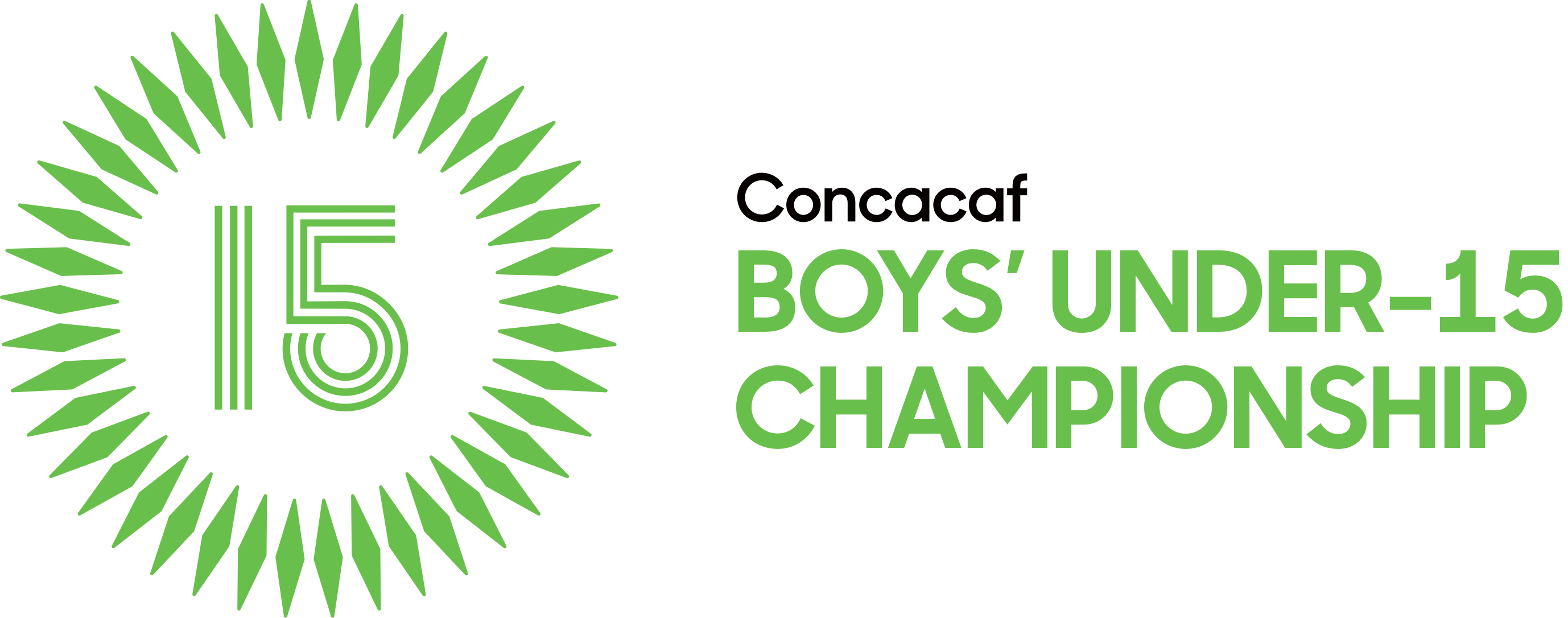
- Organizer(s): CONCACAF
- Founded: 2013
- Region: North America
- Teams: 41
- Current champion: Mexico (2nd title)
- Most championships: Mexico (2 titles)
- 2025 CONCACAF Boys' Under-15 Championship

CONCACAF Boys' Under-15 Championship is a CONCACAF football competition for players under 15 years old. The competition took place for the first time in 2013. It takes place every two years. The most recent champions are the Mexico, who won the 2025 edition.

== Results ==
Edition	Year	Host	Champion	Runner-up	3rd Place	4th Place
CONCACAF U-15 Championship
1	2013; Details	Cayman Islands	Honduras	Guatemala	El Salvador	Bermuda
CONCACAF Boys' Under-15 Championship
2	2017; Details	United States	Mexico	United States	Canada; Panama	
3	2019; Details	United States	Portugal	Slovenia	Canada; United States	
	2021; Details	Cancelled due to COVID-19 pandemic				
4	2023; Details	Dominican Republic; Curaçao	United States	Mexico	Haiti	Jamaica
5	2025; Details	Costa Rica	Mexico	United States	Costa Rica	Panama

== Successful teams ==
Team	Champions	Runners-up	Third place	Fourth place
Mexico	2 (2017, 2025)	1 (2023)	–	–
United States	1 (2023)	2 (2017,2025)	1 (2019)	–
Honduras	1 (2013)	–	–	–
Portugal	1 (2019)	–	–	–
Guatemala	–	1 (2013)	–	–
Slovenia	–	1 (2019)	–	–
Canada	–	–	2 (2017, 2019)	–
Costa Rica	–	–	1 (2025)	–
El Salvador	–	–	1 (2013)	–
Haiti	–	–	1 (2023)	–
Panama	–	–	1 (2017)	1 (2025)
Bermuda	–	–	–	1 (2013)
Jamaica	–	–	–	1 (2023)

== Awards ==
=== Best player ===
Edition	Player
2013	(Honduras) Darixon Vuelto
2019	(Portugal) Diogo Prioste

=== Best Goalkeeper ===
Edition	Player
2013	(Honduras) Wilmer Martinez
2019	(Portugal) André Gomes

=== Topscorer ===
Edition	Player	Goals
2013	(Cayman Islands) Leighton Thomas Jr.	11

== See also ==
- CONCACAF Gold Cup
- CONCACAF Men's Olympic Qualifying Tournament
- CONCACAF Under-20 Championship
- CONCACAF Under-17 Championship
