= Thailand national under-15 football team =

Thailand Under-15
- Nickname(s): ช้างศึก (Changsuek) (War elephants)
- Association: Football Association of Thailand
- Confederation: AFC (Asia)
- Sub-confederation: AFF (Southeast Asia)
- Head coach: Kuntapol Lertlamsakulkarn
- Home stadium: Rajamangala Stadium
- FIFA code: THA
First colours	Second colours	Third colours

FIFA U-15 World Cup & Festival
- Appearances: 1

The Thailand national under-15 football team is the national team for the under-15 level, representing Thailand in international football competitions in the FIFA U-15 World Cup & Festival. It is controlled by the Football Association of Thailand.

== Results and fixtures ==
Win Draw Lose

=== 2026 ===
Thailand will play in the inaugural 2026 FIFA U-15 World Cup & Festival in Azerbaijan.

24 October 2026 FIFA U-15 World Cup & Festival	Dominican Republic	2–3	Thailand	Baku, Azerbaijan
--:-- UTC+4		Report		Stadium: Hövsan Competition Complex

25 October 2026 FIFA U-15 World Cup & Festival	Slovakia	3–2	Thailand	Baku, Azerbaijan
--:-- UTC+4		Report		Stadium: Hövsan Competition Complex

25 October 2026 FIFA U-15 World Cup & Festival	Thailand	2–0	Samoa	Baku, Azerbaijan
--:-- UTC+4		Report		Stadium: Hövsan Competition Complex

26 October 2026 FIFA U-15 World Cup & Festival	Thailand	1–5	Colombia	Baku, Azerbaijan
--:-- UTC+4		Report		Stadium: Hövsan Competition Complex

26 October 2026 FIFA U-15 World Cup & Festival	Eswatini	1–4	Thailand	Baku, Azerbaijan
--:-- UTC+4		Report		Stadium: Hövsan Competition Complex

28 October 2026 FIFA U-15 World Cup & Festival	Thailand	6–4	Afghanistan	Baku, Azerbaijan
--:-- UTC+4		Report		Stadium: Hövsan Competition Complex

28 October 2026 FIFA U-15 World Cup & Festival	Tunisia	5–0	Thailand	Baku, Azerbaijan
--:-- UTC+4		Report		Stadium: Hövsan Competition Complex

29 October 2026 FIFA U-15 World Cup & Festival	Honduras	5–0	Thailand	Baku, Azerbaijan
--:-- UTC+4		Report		Stadium: Hövsan Competition Complex

29 October 2026 FIFA U-15 World Cup & Festival	Thailand	6–2	Malawi	Baku, Azerbaijan
--:-- UTC+4		Report		Stadium: Hövsan Competition Complex

30 October 2026 FIFA U-15 World Cup & Festival	Thailand	4–0	Japan	Baku, Azerbaijan
--:-- UTC+4		Report		Stadium: Hövsan Competition Complex

== Head coaches ==
Thailand national under-17 football team head coaches
Name	Country	Period	Honours
Kuntapol Lertlamsakulkarn	Thailand	2026–	

== Players ==
=== Current squad ===
The following players were called up for the 2026 FIFA U-15 World Cup & Festival in Azerbaijan.

No.	Pos.	Player	Date of birth (age)	Caps	Goals	Club
1	GK	Tinnaphop Pimthong		0	0	(Football Association of Thailand) Nongbua Pitchaya
13	GK	Ratchaphol Thamniyom		0	0	(Football Association of Thailand) Debsirin School
2	DF	Phakhin Tangsirikun		0	0	(Football Association of Thailand) Assumption College Thonburi
3	DF	Thitiwat Phoomkhokrak		0	0	(Football Association of Thailand) Chainat Hornbill
5	DF	Punjakamol Sungchuay		0	0	(Football Association of Thailand) Debsirin School
6	DF	Ratchanon Mueangma (captain)		0	0	(Football Association of Thailand) Assumption College Thonburi
4	MF	Tinnaphop Thadtho		0	0	(Football Association of Thailand) Chainat Hornbill
10	MF	Natthaphong Srisuay		0	0	(Football Association of Thailand) JFAM United
12	MF	Phadet Philadee		0	0	(Football Association of Thailand) JFAM United
7	FW	Poorinat Maneerat		0	0	(Football Association of Thailand) Assumption College Thonburi
8	MF	Pornpawit Jampathong		0	0	(Football Association of Thailand) Debsirin School
9	FW	Ratanon Anantakul		0	0	(Football Association of Thailand) Chainat Hornbill
11	FW	Pakin Thamtieng		0	0	(Football Association of Thailand) Assumption College Sriracha
14	FW	Aphiwit Onlamoon		0	0	(Football Association of Thailand) Chainat Hornbill

== Competition record ==
=== FIFA U-15 World Cup & Festival ===
FIFA U-15 World Cup & Festival finals record
Year	Host country	Result	Position	GP	W	D	L	GS	GA
2026	Azerbaijan	Tier C	77th place	10	6	0	4	28	27

== See also ==
- Thailand national football team
- Thailand national under-23 football team
- Thailand national under-21 football team
- Thailand national under-20 football team
- Thailand national under-17 football team
