= Indonesia national under-15 football team =

National youth football team representing Indonesia

Indonesia U-15
- Nickname(s): Garuda Muda (Young Garuda); Merah Putih (Red and White)
- Association: Football Association of Indonesia (PSSI)
- Confederation: AFC (Asia)
- Sub-confederation: AFF (Southeast Asia)
- Head coach: Furqon Alkatiri
- Captain: Kadek Dwi Sedana
- Home stadium: Gelora Bung Karno Stadium
- FIFA code: IDN
First colours	Second colours

First international
- Fiji 1-7 Indonesia (Baku, Azerbaijan; 24 October 2026)

Biggest win
- Fiji 1-7 Indonesia (Baku, Azerbaijan; 24 October 2026)

Biggest defeat
- Indonesia 1-6 Luxembourg (Baku, Azerbaijan; 29 October 2026)

FIFA U-15 World Cup & Festival
- Appearances: 1 (first in 2026)
- Best result: Tier C 72nd Place (2026)

The Indonesia national under-15 football team represents Indonesia in international youth football competitions and is controlled by the Football Association of Indonesia (PSSI).

Historically, Indonesia has operated under-15 squads primarily for developmental regional matches. In October 2026, the team achieved a significant breakthrough by entering its first major global competition following the announcement of their participation in the newly established 2026 FIFA U-15 World Cup & Festival in Azerbaijan.

== History ==
=== 2026: FIFA U-15 World Cup & Festival ===
In October 2026, the chairman of PSSI, Erick Thohir, officially confirmed that the Indonesia under-15 national team would participate in the inaugural edition of the FIFA U-15 World Cup & Festival, scheduled to be held in Baku, Azerbaijan, from 22 to 31 October 2026. The development-driven competition was established by FIFA to give extensive global competitive exposure to youth squads across the world, inviting member associations without requiring traditional qualification rounds.

Former Persija Jakarta U20 coach Furqon Alkatiri was selected to lead the squad for this tournament. Indonesia was placed into Group G alongside Portugal, Wales, Bangladesh, Burundi, and Fiji. Unlike traditional football, matches in this festival utilize a specific 8-a-side format played on smaller pitch sizes with two 20-minute halves to foster the technical and physical progression of youth players.

== Recent results and fixtures ==
The following is a list of match results in the last 12 months, as well as any future matches that have been scheduled.

Legend

Win Draw Loss Fixture

=== 2026 ===
24 October U-15 World Cup & Festival QS	Fiji	1–7	Indonesia	Baku, Azerbaijan
10:15 UTC+4	Swami 11'	Report	N. Alfiansyah 1'; D.C. Marani 21', 38'; H. Maulana 26', 34'; Prasad 28' (o.g.); R.H. Maulana 40'	Stadium: Hövsan Competition Complex Pitch 6A

25 October U-15 World Cup & Festival QS	Wales	3–0	Indonesia	Baku, Azerbaijan
14:30 UTC+4	Gregson 22'; Jennings 30'; Jeremy 34'	Report		Stadium: Hövsan Competition Complex Pitch 6A

25 October U-15 World Cup & Festival QS	Indonesia	1–1	Bangladesh	Baku, Azerbaijan
20:45 UTC+4	K.D. Putra 40'	Report	Bayzid 8'	Stadium: Hövsan Competition Complex Pitch 6A

26 October U-15 World Cup & Festival QS	Indonesia	1–2	Portugal	Baku, Azerbaijan
14:30 UTC+4	K.D. Putra 38'	Report	Afonso 20'; Queiroz 28'	Stadium: Hövsan Competition Complex Pitch 6A

26 October U-15 World Cup & Festival QS	Burundi	1–6	Indonesia	Baku, Azerbaijan
23:45 UTC+4	Player 10 28'	Report	H. Maulana 2' (?); ? Maulana 10'; R.H. Maulana (?); N. Alfiansyah (?); Player x (?) (o.g.)	Stadium: Hövsan Competition Complex Pitch 6A

28 October U-15 World Cup & Festival Tier C 65th — 96th R32	Indonesia	3–3 (9–8 p)	Moldova	Baku, Azerbaijan
14:30 UTC+4	N. Alfiansyah 3', 36'; Player x 33'	Report	Player x 22'; Player x 24'; Player x 39'	Stadium: Hövsan Competition Complex Pitch 6A
	Penalties
	N. Alfiansyah (penalty scored); L. Musaling (penalty scored); R. Maulana (penalty scored); D. Febrianto (penalty scored); R.H Maulana (penalty scored); K.D. Putra (penalty missed); Player x (penalty scored); H. Maulana (penalty missed); Player x (penalty scored); K.D. Putra (penalty scored); H. Maulana (penalty scored)		Player x (penalty scored); Player x (penalty scored); Player x (penalty scored); Player x (penalty scored); Player x (penalty scored); Player x (penalty scored); Player x (penalty missed); Player x (penalty scored); Player x (penalty missed); Player x (penalty scored); Player x (penalty missed)

28 October U-15 World Cup & Festival Tier C 65th — 80th R16	Panama	3–5	Indonesia	Baku, Azerbaijan
21:15 UTC+4	Player x 14'; Player x 16'; Player x 38'	Report	N. Alfiyansyah 5', 40'; L. Musaling 14'; ? Maulana 17'; M. Fayyad 33'	Stadium: Hövsan Competition Complex Pitch 6A

29 October U-15 World Cup & Festival Tier C 65th—72nd QF	Indonesia	1–6	Luxembourg	Baku, Azerbaijan
12:00 UTC+4	L. Musaling 29'	Report	Player x 7'; Player x 23'; Player x 30'; Player x 35'; Player x 37'; Player x 39'	Stadium: Hövsan Competition Complex Pitch 6A

29 October U-15 World Cup & Festival Tier C 69th — 72nd SF	France	5–1	Indonesia	Baku, Azerbaijan
12:00 UTC+4	Player x 9'; Player x 10'; Player x 14'; Player x 22'; Player x (?)	Report	Player x 34'	Stadium: Hövsan Competition Complex Pitch 6A

30 October U-15 World Cup & Festival Tier C 71st Place Match	Indonesia	0–1	Benin	Baku, Azerbaijan
12:00 UTC+4		Report		Stadium: Hövsan Competition Complex Pitch 6A

== Coaching staff ==
Position	Name
Head coach	(Indonesia) Furqon Alkatiri
Assistant coaches	Vacant
Assistant coaches	Vacant
Goalkeeping coaches	(Indonesia) Andreas Kristiyanto
Fitness coach	Vacant
Analyst	Vacant
Doctor	Vacant
Physiotherapists	Vacant
Team manager	Vacant

== Players ==
=== Current squad ===
The following players were called up for the 2026 FIFA U-15 World Cup & Festival in Azerbaijan.

No.	Pos.	Player	Date of birth (age)	Caps	Goals	Club
1	GK	Renaldy Syahreza				(Football Association of Indonesia) Persebaya Surabaya
14	GK	Vano Abimanyu				(Football Association of Indonesia) PSS Sleman
2	DF	Muhammad Fayyad				(Football Association of Indonesia) PSM Makassar
3	DF	Jasshen Sokoy				(Football Association of Indonesia) Persebaya Surabaya
5	DF	Reganatha Harfi				(Football Association of Indonesia) Persija Jakarta
4	DF	Kadek Dwi Sedana (captain)				(Football Association of Indonesia) Bali United
12	DF	Jamaeel Ryuzain				(Football Association of Indonesia) Asiana Soccer School
6	MF	Daniel Febrianto				(Football Association of Indonesia) Papua Football Academy
8	MF	Hariri Maulana				(Football Association of Indonesia) Persebaya Surabaya
10	MF	Decho Alfian				(Football Association of Indonesia) Asiana Soccer School
11	MF	Dicky Marani				(Football Association of Indonesia) Papua Football Academy
7	FW	Lyonel Musaling				(Football Association of Indonesia) Garudayaksa
9	FW	Nazar Alfiansyah				(Football Association of Indonesia) Persija Jakarta
13	FW	Rendra Maulana				(Football Association of Indonesia) Persebaya Surabaya

== Competitive record ==
=== FIFA U-15 World Cup & Festival ===
Year	Round	Position	Pld	W	D	L	GF	GA
(Azerbaijan) 2026	Tier C	72nd	10	3	2	5	25	26
Total	Best : Tier C 72nd Place	1/1	10	3	2	5	25	26

== See also ==
- Indonesia national football team
- Indonesia national under-23 football team
- Indonesia national under-21 football team
- Indonesia national under-20 football team
- Indonesia national under-17 football team
- Indonesia women's national football team
- Indonesia women's national futsal team
- Indonesia national beach soccer team
- Indonesia national futsal team
