= 2026 FIFA U-15 World Cup & Festival =

International U-15 football competition

2026 FIFA U-15 Dünya Kuboku və Festivalı

Tournament details
- Host country: Azerbaijan
- Dates: 24–30 October
- Teams: 189 (from 6 confederations)
- Venues: 2 (in 1 host city)

Final positions
- Champions: Spain (1st title)
- Runners-up: Czech Republic
- Third place: Greece
- Fourth place: Paraguay

Tournament statistics
- Matches played: 932
- Goals scored: 4,506 (4.83 per match)

The 2026 FIFA U-15 World Cup & Festival was the inaugural edition of the FIFA U-15 World Cup & Festival, an international youth football competition organised by FIFA, eligible for players born in 2011 or 2012. It was held in Baku, Azerbaijan, with matches scheduled from 24 to 30 October 2026.

The competition is tentatively open to all FIFA member associations; 189 teams from six confederations have been drawn into 32 groups. Matches are played in an 8v8 format. Teams first play a round-robin qualification stage; their results then determine which of six performance tiers they compete in during the tournament stage. No team is eliminated, and a winner is crowned in each tier, with the winner of the top tier honoured as the champion of the tournament.

The tournament was created following the FIFA Council's decision in December 2025, as part of FIFA's commitment to youth football development. Azerbaijan was appointed host by the Bureau of the FIFA Council on 25 June 2026. A girls' edition is scheduled for 2027, and boys' and girls' tournaments are planned to take place annually from 2028.

== Background ==
Ahead of the FIFA Intercontinental Cup final in Doha, Qatar, on 17 December 2025, the FIFA Council met and took a number of decisions on youth football and governance. At the same meeting, FIFA President Gianni Infantino announced the creation of new festival-style tournaments for boys and girls aged 15, open to all 211 member associations, as part of an initiative to give every talented player an opportunity. The first tournament would be held for boys in 2026 and the second for girls in 2027, with separate competitions for both categories from 2028.

Arsène Wenger, FIFA's Chief of Global Football Development, said the tournament is intended to give young players from associations with limited international opportunities meaningful matches against different styles and football cultures, and to encourage member associations to keep investing in youth development. FIFA describes the competition as addressing the difficulty many associations face in qualifying for FIFA tournaments.

=== Commercialisation talks ===
According to a report by The Athletic published on 20 August 2026, Infantino held talks with private investors about a commercially developed under-15 tournament for all 211 members, inspired by baseball's Little League World Series. One proposal, drawn up by Juan Carlos Rodríguez, a former commissioner of the Mexican Football Federation, and other business figures, was backed by Eldridge Industries, a holding company chaired by Todd Boehly. It envisaged staging the event at the ESPN Wide World of Sports Complex in Florida, with options to hold the opening and closing ceremonies at Disney theme parks, and talks were held with ESPN, the broadcaster of the Little League World Series. Infantino was also reported to have considered an opening match between Israel and Palestine, an idea that was not part of that proposal. The commercial plans were shelved shortly before the 2026 FIFA World Cup, and FIFA organised the competition itself.

== Host selection and preparations ==
FIFA stated that its decision to appoint Azerbaijan followed an assessment of the country's sporting and general infrastructure, and noted that Azerbaijan had already been appointed to co-host the 2027 FIFA U-20 World Cup with Uzbekistan, describing the U-15 event as offering "a sense of strategic continuity". Azerbaijan had previously hosted the 2012 FIFA U-17 Women's World Cup, the 2019 UEFA Europa League final and matches at UEFA Euro 2020.

On 27 July 2026, President Ilham Aliyev signed a decree on hosting the tournament, entrusting its coordination to the organising committee of the U-20 World Cup, headed by Deputy Prime Minister Samir Sharifov. The committee discussed preparations for both the U-15 and U-20 tournaments at a meeting on 5 August 2026.

FIFA is covering the cost of air travel to Azerbaijan and hotel accommodation for the participating national teams. Each team's delegation consists of 14 players and up to six staff members, and more than 3,000 players, coaches and officials are expected to take part. Around 250 volunteers will help deliver the tournament; the volunteer programme, organised by FIFA and the Association of Football Federations of Azerbaijan, opened for registration on 10 September 2026.

=== Visual identity ===
The tournament's visual identity, described by FIFA under the theme "one grid, a thousand stars, one World Cup festival", is built around a grid of colourful squares and circles intended to evoke a playground and a festival, and to represent the diversity of the participating cultures.

== Venues ==
All matches were played in Baku, mostly at the Hövsan Competition Complex (located in the Hövsan settlement), where up to 20 matches could be played simultaneously; the opening match and the six tier finals were played at Baku Crystal Hall. After the tournament, its pitches were proposed to become a youth football academy.

Baku		Location of the host city, Baku
Hövsan Competition Complex	Baku Crystal Hall	Location of the host city, Baku
One of the football pitches of the Hövsan Competition Complex	Exterior of Baku Crystal Hall	Location of the host city, Baku
Pitches: 20 (10 pitches, each with an A and a B pitch)	Capacity: 12,000 (seated); 27,000 (with standing room)	Location of the host city, Baku
Qualification and tournament stages	Opening match (24 October) and tier finals (30 October)	Location of the host city, Baku

== Format ==
The competition is divided into a qualification stage and a tournament stage. In the qualification stage, teams are placed in groups that provide diverse sporting and regional representation and play a round-robin tournament; each team plays four to five matches. In the tournament stage, teams play a further four to five matches, determined by their results and their subsequent tier placement.

The draw divided 191 teams into 31 groups of six teams and 1 group of five (Group I); Eritrea and Libya withdrew before the tournament began, leaving Group V and Group AA with five teams each. The qualification stage consists of 465 matches according to the official schedule. A team's position in its group determines the tier it enters for the tournament stage: group winners are placed together, runners-up together, and so on. The second stage consists of six performance tiers; every team continues to play until the final matchday, the winners of each tier are crowned, and the winner of Tier A is honoured as champion of the FIFA U-15 World Cup & Festival. Within a tier, matches follow a cross-elimination system, in which winners meet winners and losing teams meet other losing teams. There is no extra time; drawn matches are decided by a penalty shoot-out.

=== Match rules ===
Matches are played 8v8, with eight players per side including the goalkeeper, in two halves of 20 minutes with a five-minute half-time interval. The pitch measures 68 by 47 metres and uses full-size goals (7.32 by 2.44 metres). Each team may register 14 players, born in 2011 or 2012. According to a July 2026 report, teams must include at least two goalkeepers among their registered players; substitutions are unlimited and rolling; throw-ins are replaced by kick-ins; offside applies only close to each goal, with offside lines 23 metres from the goal lines; and each match is officiated by two referees, each responsible for one half of the pitch.

=== Match schedule ===
All kick-off times are local (AZT, UTC+4) and subject to change. On matchdays, the first kick-off at the Hövsan Competition Complex is at 09:00 and the last at 20:45; up to ten matches are scheduled per pitch each day. FIFA said that almost 1,000 matches would be played across six matchdays.

Date	Day	Activity	Matches
22 October	Thursday	Arrival day	–
23 October	Friday	Training day	–
24 October	Saturday	Matchday 1 – qualification stage Opening ceremony and opening match (Baku Crystal Hall)	92 at Hövsan, plus the opening match
25 October	Sunday	Matchday 2 – qualification stage	186
26 October	Monday	Matchday 3 – qualification stage	186
27 October	Tuesday	Rest day	–
28 October	Wednesday	Matchday 4 – tournament stage	186
29 October	Thursday	Matchday 5 – tournament stage	186
30 October	Friday	Matchday 6 – tournament stage Six tier finals, awards and closing ceremony (Baku Crystal Hall)	87 at Hövsan, plus the six tier finals
31 October	Saturday	Departure day	–

== Participating teams ==
All entered teams were placed directly into the qualification stage; there was no qualifying competition. The associations represented by confederation are listed below.

List of teams
Status	AFC (Asia)	CAF (Africa)	CONCACAF (North, Central America and Caribbean)	CONMEBOL (South America)	OFC (Oceania)	UEFA (Europe)
Participating teams (189)	45 teams: Afghanistan; Australia; Bahrain; Bangladesh; Bhutan; Brunei; Cambodia; China; Chinese Taipei; Guam; Hong Kong; India; Indonesia; Iran; Iraq; Japan; Jordan; Kuwait; Kyrgyzstan; Laos; Lebanon; Macau; Malaysia; Maldives; Mongolia; Myanmar; Nepal; Oman; Pakistan; Palestine; Philippines; Qatar; Saudi Arabia; Singapore; South Korea; Sri Lanka; Syria; Tajikistan; Thailand; Timor-Leste; Turkmenistan; United Arab Emirates; Uzbekistan; Vietnam; Yemen	52 teams: Algeria; Angola; Benin; Botswana; Burkina Faso; Burundi; Cameroon; Cape Verde; Central African Republic; Chad; Comoros; Congo; DR Congo; Djibouti; Egypt; Equatorial Guinea; Eswatini; Ethiopia; Gabon; Gambia; Ghana; Guinea; Guinea-Bissau; Ivory Coast; Kenya; Lesotho; Liberia; Madagascar; Malawi; Mali; Mauritania; Mauritius; Morocco; Mozambique; Namibia; Niger; Nigeria; Rwanda; Senegal; Seychelles; Sierra Leone; Somalia; South Africa; South Sudan; Sudan; São Tomé and Príncipe; Tanzania; Togo; Tunisia; Uganda; Zambia; Zimbabwe	34 teams: Anguilla; Antigua and Barbuda; Aruba; Bahamas; Barbados; Belize; Bermuda; British Virgin Islands; Canada; Cayman Islands; Costa Rica; Cuba; Curaçao; Dominica; Dominican Republic; El Salvador; Grenada; Guatemala; Guyana; Haiti; Honduras; Jamaica; Mexico; Montserrat; Nicaragua; Panama; Puerto Rico; Saint Kitts and Nevis; Saint Lucia; Saint Vincent and the Grenadines; Suriname; Trinidad and Tobago; Turks and Caicos Islands; U.S. Virgin Islands	10 teams: Argentina; Bolivia; Brazil; Chile; Colombia; Ecuador; Paraguay; Peru; Uruguay; Venezuela	11 teams: American Samoa; Cook Islands; Fiji; New Caledonia; New Zealand; Papua New Guinea; Samoa; Solomon Islands; Tahiti; Tonga; Vanuatu	37 teams: Albania; Andorra; Azerbaijan; Belarus; Bosnia and Herzegovina; Bulgaria; Croatia; Cyprus; Czech Republic; England; Estonia; France; Georgia; Gibraltar; Greece; Hungary; Israel; Italy; Kazakhstan; Kosovo; Latvia; Lithuania; Luxembourg; Malta; Moldova; Montenegro; North Macedonia; Northern Ireland; Poland; Portugal; Republic of Ireland; Russia; Scotland; Slovakia; Spain; Turkey; Wales
Withdrawn teams (2)		2 teams: Eritrea (Note: Eritrea withdrew after the initial match schedule was released. Originally drawn into Group AA.); Libya (Note: Libya withdrew after the initial match schedule was released. Originally drawn into Group V.)				
Did not enter (20)	1 team: North Korea		1 team: United States			18 teams: Armenia; Austria; Belgium; Denmark; Faroe Islands; Finland; Germany; Iceland; Liechtenstein; Netherlands; Norway; Romania; San Marino; Serbia; Slovenia; Sweden; Switzerland; Ukraine

According to the Associated Press, 37 of UEFA's 55 member associations were in the draw, with Ukraine not involved; Germany and the Netherlands will also not play, and the United States and North Korea are also missing.

=== Russia and political discussions ===
Because the competition is open to all FIFA member associations, the Russian Football Union was able to enter a Russian U-15 team, even though Russian senior and youth national teams have been excluded from FIFA and UEFA competitions since 2022. The permission applies only to a competition held under the FIFA banner and does not extend to UEFA's bans; in autumn 2023, UEFA reversed a decision to allow youth teams to compete under neutral status after pressure from other federations.

Russia was included in the draw and placed in Group AE with Turkey, Afghanistan, Djibouti, Sierra Leone and Sudan. It is the first FIFA competition in which a Russian team has been involved since the 2022 invasion of Ukraine. According to the Russian Football Union, the team will compete under its national flag and anthem.

Ukraine, which is not taking part, urged other associations to boycott the tournament; its minister of youth and sports, Matvii Bidnyi, said Russia's inclusion legitimised a "terrorist state", and a Ukrainian statement thanked Iceland and Germany for declining to take part. The Ukrainian Association of Football had earlier said it would withdraw from any tournament featuring the Russian team.

== Draw ==
The 191 teams were drawn into 32 groups, named Group A to Group AF. A simple pre-tournament ranking, combining the performance of each association's senior national team with the recent participation and results of its youth national teams, was used to support balanced group formation. The groups became known on 17 September 2026, with FIFA announcing the draw and match schedule publicly the following day. Azerbaijan, as hosts, are in Group AF.

== Qualification stage ==
The qualification stage was played from 24 to 26 October 2026 at the Hövsan Competition Complex in Baku, with the opening match at Baku Crystal Hall, followed by a rest day on 27 October. Each team played others in its group once. No team was eliminated: each team's final position in the group determined which tier it entered in the tournament stage. Groups I, V, and AA contained five teams each; all other groups contained six teams.

Tie-breaking criteria for group stage ranking
The ranking of teams in each group was determined by the points obtained in all qualification stage matches. If two or more teams were equal on points, the following criteria were used to determine the ranking:
1. Most points obtained in the qualification stage matches played between the teams concerned;
2. Superior goal difference in the qualification stage matches played between the teams concerned;
3. Most goals scored in the qualification stage matches played between the teams concerned;

If, after having applied criteria a to c, teams still had an equal ranking, criteria a to c were reapplied exclusively to the matches between the teams who were still level to determine their final rankings. (Note: When there were two or more teams tied on points, criteria a to c were applied. After these criteria were applied, they may have defined the position of some of the teams involved, but not all of them. For example, if there was a three-way tie on points, the application of the first three criteria may only have broken the tie for one of the teams, leaving the other two teams still tied. In this case, the tiebreaking procedure was resumed, from the beginning, for those teams that were still tied.) If this procedure did not lead to a decision, criteria d to f applied.

4. Superior goal difference in all qualification stage matches;
5. Most goals scored in all qualification stage matches;
6. Highest team conduct ("fair play") score in all qualification stage matches (only one deduction could be applied to a player or team coach/official in a single match):
  - Yellow card: −1 point;
  - Indirect red card (second yellow card): −3 points;
  - Direct red card: −4 points;
  - Yellow card and direct red card: −5 points;

=== Group A ===
Pos	Team	Pld	W	D	L	GF	GA	GD	Pts	Qualification	Estonia	South Africa	France	Kosovo	Maldives	Anguilla
1	Estonia	5	3	2	0	13	3	+10	11	Advance to Tier A		0–0	2–2	1–0	3–1	7–0
2	South Africa	5	3	1	1	25	5	+20	10 (Note: Head-to-head result: France 2–3 South Africa.)	Advance to Tier B			3–2	1–2	8–0	13–1
3	France	5	3	1	1	20	6	+14	10	Advance to Tier C				2–0	6–0	8–1
4	Kosovo	5	3	0	2	8	5	+3	9	Advance to Tier D					3–0	3–1
5	Maldives	5	0	1	4	4	23	−19	1 (Note: Tied on head-to-head result (Maldives 3–3 Anguilla). Overall goal difference was used as the tiebreaker.)	Advance to Tier E						3–3
6	Anguilla	5	0	1	4	6	34	−28	1	Advance to Tier F						

Source: FIFA
Rules for classification: Qualification stage tiebreakers

=== Group B ===
Pos	Team	Pld	W	D	L	GF	GA	GD	Pts	Qualification	Algeria	Argentina	Malawi	Oman	Chinese Taipei	Suriname
1	Algeria	5	4	1	0	18	3	+15	13	Advance to Tier A		1–0	4–0	3–3	5–0	5–0
2	Argentina	5	4	0	1	13	4	+9	12	Advance to Tier B			4–2	5–1	1–0	3–0
3	Malawi	5	3	0	2	11	12	−1	9	Advance to Tier C				3–1	3–2	3–1
4	Oman	5	2	1	2	13	13	0	7	Advance to Tier D					4–2	4–0
5	Chinese Taipei	5	1	0	4	7	15	−8	3	Advance to Tier E						3–2
6	Suriname	5	0	0	5	3	18	−15	0	Advance to Tier F						

Source: FIFA
Rules for classification: Qualification stage tiebreakers

=== Group C ===
Pos	Team	Pld	W	D	L	GF	GA	GD	Pts	Qualification	Ireland	England	Nicaragua	Zimbabwe	Montenegro	Cambodia
1	Republic of Ireland	5	4	1	0	20	8	+12	13	Advance to Tier A		4–1	3–3	5–3	4–0	4–1
2	England	5	4	0	1	19	5	+14	12	Advance to Tier B			4–0	2–0	2–1	10–0
3	Nicaragua	5	2	1	2	10	11	−1	7	Advance to Tier C				2–1	1–2	4–1
4	Zimbabwe	5	2	0	3	11	12	−1	6 (Note: Head-to-head result: Montenegro 1–4 Zimbabwe.)	Advance to Tier D					4–1	3–2
5	Montenegro	5	2	0	3	7	11	−4	6	Advance to Tier E						3–0
6	Cambodia	5	0	0	5	4	24	−20	0	Advance to Tier F						

Source: FIFA
Rules for classification: Qualification stage tiebreakers

=== Group D ===
Pos	Team	Pld	W	D	L	GF	GA	GD	Pts	Qualification	Brazil	El Salvador	Tunisia	Democratic Republic of the Congo	Guinea-Bissau	Nepal
1	Brazil	5	5	0	0	25	2	+23	15	Advance to Tier A		7–0	2–1	3–0	8–0	5–1
2	El Salvador	5	3	0	2	7	13	−6	9 (Note: Head-to-head result: Tunisia 1–2 El Salvador.)	Advance to Tier B			2–1	3–2	1–0	1–3
3	Tunisia	5	3	0	2	14	10	+4	9	Advance to Tier C				3–1	6–4	3–1
4	DR Congo	5	2	0	3	8	9	−1	6	Advance to Tier D					1–0	4–0
5	Guinea-Bissau	5	1	0	4	8	16	−8	3 (Note: Head-to-head result: Nepal 0–4 Guinea-Bissau.)	Advance to Tier E						4–0
6	Nepal	5	1	0	4	5	17	−12	3	Advance to Tier F						

Source: FIFA
Rules for classification: Qualification stage tiebreakers

=== Group E ===
Pos	Team	Pld	W	D	L	GF	GA	GD	Pts	Qualification	Spain	Republic of the Congo	Chile	Tajikistan	Kuwait	Barbados
1	Spain	5	5	0	0	23	5	+18	15	Advance to Tier A		4–2	4–2	6–1	2–0	7–0
2	Congo	5	4	0	1	15	8	+7	12	Advance to Tier B			3–2	3–2	3–0	4–0
3	Chile	5	2	1	2	15	8	+7	7 (Note: Tied on head-to-head result (Chile 1–1 Tajikistan). Overall goal difference was used as the tiebreaker.)	Advance to Tier C				1–1	2–0	8–0
4	Tajikistan	5	2	1	2	14	10	+4	7	Advance to Tier D					3–0	7–0
5	Kuwait	5	1	0	4	2	11	−9	3	Advance to Tier E						2–1
6	Barbados	5	0	0	5	1	28	−27	0	Advance to Tier F						

Source: FIFA
Rules for classification: Qualification stage tiebreakers

=== Group F ===
Pos	Team	Pld	W	D	L	GF	GA	GD	Pts	Qualification	Morocco	Costa Rica	Liberia	Philippines	Belize	Curaçao
1	Morocco	5	5	0	0	24	3	+21	15	Advance to Tier A		4–2	5–1	2–0	6–0	7–0
2	Costa Rica	5	4	0	1	43	9	+34	12	Advance to Tier B			9–2	7–1	8–2	17–0
3	Liberia	5	2	1	2	10	18	−8	7	Advance to Tier C				1–0	1–1	5–3
4	Philippines	5	2	0	3	10	11	−1	6	Advance to Tier D					1–0	8–1
5	Belize	5	1	1	3	6	18	−12	4	Advance to Tier E						3–2
6	Curaçao	5	0	0	5	6	40	−34	0	Advance to Tier F						

Source: FIFA
Rules for classification: Qualification stage tiebreakers

=== Group G ===
Pos	Team	Pld	W	D	L	GF	GA	GD	Pts	Qualification	Wales	Portugal	Indonesia	Burundi	Bangladesh	Fiji
1	Wales	5	4	1	0	18	3	+15	13	Advance to Tier A		2–1	3–0	3–1	0–0	10–1
2	Portugal	5	4	0	1	15	4	+11	12	Advance to Tier B			2–1	1–0	3–1	8–0
3	Indonesia	5	2	1	2	15	8	+7	7	Advance to Tier C				6–1	1–1	7–1
4	Burundi	5	2	0	3	6	10	−4	6	Advance to Tier D					2–0	2–0
5	Bangladesh	5	1	2	2	5	7	−2	5	Advance to Tier E						3–1
6	Fiji	5	0	0	5	3	30	−27	0	Advance to Tier F						

Source: FIFA
Rules for classification: Qualification stage tiebreakers

=== Group H ===
Pos	Team	Pld	W	D	L	GF	GA	GD	Pts	Qualification	Mexico	Malaysia	Hungary	Syria	Dominica	Ethiopia
1	Mexico	5	5	0	0	24	2	+22	15	Advance to Tier A		1–0	3–1	7–1	5–0	8–0
2	Malaysia	5	3	1	1	12	4	+8	10	Advance to Tier B			1–1	3–1	3–1	5–0
3	Hungary	5	2	1	2	8	8	0	7	Advance to Tier C				1–0	2–4	3–0
4	Syria	5	2	0	3	7	11	−4	6 (Note: Head-to-head result: Dominica 0–3 Syria.)	Advance to Tier D					3–0	2–0
5	Dominica	5	2	0	3	7	14	−7	6	Advance to Tier E						2–1
6	Ethiopia	5	0	0	5	1	20	−19	0	Advance to Tier F						

Source: FIFA
Rules for classification: Qualification stage tiebreakers

=== Group I ===
Pos	Team	Pld	W	D	L	GF	GA	GD	Pts	Qualification	Bulgaria	Latvia	Scotland	Lesotho	Gabon
1	Bulgaria	4	4	0	0	14	7	+7	12	Advance to Tier A		3–2	3–2	5–1	3–2
2	Latvia	4	2	1	1	14	6	+8	7 (Note: Tied on head-to-head result (Latvia 1–1 Scotland). Overall goal difference was used as the tiebreaker.)	Advance to Tier B			1–1	2–1	9–1
3	Scotland	4	2	1	1	11	5	+6	7	Advance to Tier C				3–1	5–0
4	Lesotho	4	1	0	3	6	12	−6	3	Advance to Tier D					3–2
5	Gabon	4	0	0	4	5	20	−15	0	Advance to Tier E					

Source: FIFA
Rules for classification: Qualification stage tiebreakers

=== Group J ===
Pos	Team	Pld	W	D	L	GF	GA	GD	Pts	Qualification	Angola	People's Republic of China	Japan	Saudi Arabia	Central African Republic	Solomon Islands
1	Angola	5	5	0	0	17	6	+11	15	Advance to Tier A		3–2	2–1	4–0	5–2	3–1
2	China	5	3	1	1	20	9	+11	10 (Note: Tied on head-to-head result (China 1–1 Japan). Overall goal difference was used as the tiebreaker.)	Advance to Tier B			1–1	5–2	4–0	8–3
3	Japan	5	3	1	1	8	4	+4	10	Advance to Tier C				1–0	2–1	3–0
4	Saudi Arabia	5	2	0	3	7	10	−3	6	Advance to Tier D					1–0	4–0
5	Central African Republic	5	1	0	4	14	16	−2	3	Advance to Tier E						11–4
6	Solomon Islands	5	0	0	5	8	29	−21	0	Advance to Tier F						

Source: FIFA
Rules for classification: Qualification stage tiebreakers

=== Group K ===
Pos	Team	Pld	W	D	L	GF	GA	GD	Pts	Qualification	Cameroon	Senegal	India	Bahrain	Laos	Grenada
1	Cameroon	5	4	0	1	16	4	+12	12 (Note: Head-to-head result: Cameroon 3–0 Senegal.)	Advance to Tier A		3–0	1–2	2–0	6–1	4–1
2	Senegal	5	4	0	1	29	6	+23	12	Advance to Tier B			6–1	7–1	9–0	7–1
3	India	5	3	1	1	14	15	−1	10	Advance to Tier C				4–3	4–2	3–3
4	Bahrain	5	1	1	3	9	14	−5	4 (Note: Tied on head-to-head result (Bahrain 1–1 Laos). Overall goal difference was used as the tiebreaker.)	Advance to Tier D					1–1	4–0
5	Laos	5	1	1	3	11	20	−9	4	Advance to Tier E						7–0
6	Grenada	5	0	1	4	5	25	−20	1	Advance to Tier F						

Source: FIFA
Rules for classification: Qualification stage tiebreakers

=== Group L ===
Pos	Team	Pld	W	D	L	GF	GA	GD	Pts	Qualification	Italy	Qatar	Benin	Turkmenistan	Hong Kong	Cook Islands
1	Italy	5	5	0	0	30	4	+26	15	Advance to Tier A		3–0	6–1	5–1	7–2	9–0
2	Qatar	5	3	1	1	12	6	+6	10	Advance to Tier B			3–2	4–0	1–1	4–0
3	Benin	5	2	1	2	18	11	+7	7	Advance to Tier C				4–1	1–1	10–0
4	Turkmenistan	5	2	0	3	7	15	−8	6	Advance to Tier D					2–1	3–1
5	Hong Kong	5	1	2	2	8	11	−3	5	Advance to Tier E						3–0
6	Cook Islands	5	0	0	5	1	29	−28	0	Advance to Tier F						

Source: FIFA
Rules for classification: Qualification stage tiebreakers

=== Group M ===
Pos	Team	Pld	W	D	L	GF	GA	GD	Pts	Qualification	Colombia	Slovakia	Thailand	Dominican Republic	Eswatini	Samoa
1	Colombia	5	4	1	0	26	3	+23	13	Advance to Tier A		3–0	5–1	1–1	6–1	11–0
2	Slovakia	5	4	0	1	20	6	+14	12	Advance to Tier B			3–2	5–0	2–1	10–0
3	Thailand	5	3	0	2	13	11	+2	9	Advance to Tier C				3–2	4–1	3–0
4	Dominican Republic	5	2	1	2	11	10	+1	7	Advance to Tier D					3–1	5–0
5	Eswatini	5	1	0	4	7	15	−8	3	Advance to Tier E						3–0
6	Samoa	5	0	0	5	0	32	−32	0	Advance to Tier F						

Source: FIFA
Rules for classification: Qualification stage tiebreakers

=== Group N ===
Pos	Team	Pld	W	D	L	GF	GA	GD	Pts	Qualification	Greece	Croatia	Yemen	Aruba	Palestine	Saint Lucia
1	Greece	5	5	0	0	21	5	+16	15	Advance to Tier A		4–1	3–2	7–0	3–0	4–2
2	Croatia	5	3	1	1	15	9	+6	10	Advance to Tier B			5–0	4–4	2–1	3–0
3	Yemen	5	3	0	2	15	14	+1	9	Advance to Tier C				6–4	3–1	4–1
4	Aruba	5	1	2	2	16	18	−2	5	Advance to Tier D					1–1	7–0
5	Palestine	5	1	1	3	9	9	0	4	Advance to Tier E						6–0
6	Saint Lucia	5	0	0	5	3	24	−21	0	Advance to Tier F						

Source: FIFA
Rules for classification: Qualification stage tiebreakers

=== Group O ===
Pos	Team	Pld	W	D	L	GF	GA	GD	Pts	Qualification	Mali	Belarus	Botswana	Mongolia	Papua New Guinea
1	Peru	5	4	1	0	19	3	+16	13	Advance to Tier A	2–1	2–2	2–0	1–0	12–0
2	Mali	5	4	0	1	22	5	+17	12	Advance to Tier B		2–1	7–1	4–1	8–0
3	Belarus	5	3	1	1	37	4	+33	10	Advance to Tier C			7–0	7–0	20–0
4	Botswana	5	2	0	3	7	18	−11	6	Advance to Tier D				4–1	2–1
5	Mongolia	5	1	0	4	8	18	−10	3	Advance to Tier E					6–2
6	Papua New Guinea	5	0	0	5	3	48	−45	0	Advance to Tier F					

Source: FIFA
Rules for classification: Qualification stage tiebreakers

=== Group P ===
Pos	Team	Pld	W	D	L	GF	GA	GD	Pts	Qualification	Guinea	Guatemala	Honduras	Canada	Singapore	American Samoa
1	Guinea	5	4	1	0	29	4	+25	13	Advance to Tier A		2–1	2–2	2–1	6–0	17–0
2	Guatemala	5	3	1	1	16	5	+11	10 (Note: Head-to-head result: Honduras 2–3 Guatemala.)	Advance to Tier B			3–2	1–1	1–0	10–0
3	Honduras	5	3	1	1	26	6	+20	10	Advance to Tier C				3–1	3–0	16–0
4	Canada	5	2	1	2	29	7	+22	7	Advance to Tier D					6–0	20–1
5	Singapore	5	1	0	4	12	16	−4	3	Advance to Tier E						12–0
6	American Samoa	5	0	0	5	1	75	−74	0	Advance to Tier F						

Source: FIFA
Rules for classification: Qualification stage tiebreakers

=== Group Q ===
Pos	Team	Pld	W	D	L	GF	GA	GD	Pts	Qualification	South Korea	United Arab Emirates	Luxembourg	Lithuania	Saint Vincent and the Grenadines	Bhutan
1	South Korea	5	4	0	1	21	6	+15	12 (Note: Tied on head-to-head points. Head-to-head goal difference was used as the tiebreaker (South Korea +1, United Arab Emirates 0, Luxembourg −1).)	Advance to Tier A		0–1	4–2	4–2	5–1	8–0
2	United Arab Emirates	5	4	0	1	12	2	+10	12	Advance to Tier B			1–2	2–0	4–0	4–0
3	Luxembourg	5	4	0	1	19	7	+12	12	Advance to Tier C				3–1	6–1	6–0
4	Lithuania	5	2	0	3	21	10	+11	6	Advance to Tier D					6–1	12–0
5	Saint Vincent and the Grenadines	5	1	0	4	8	22	−14	3	Advance to Tier E						5–1
6	Bhutan	5	0	0	5	1	35	−34	0	Advance to Tier F						

Source: FIFA
Rules for classification: Qualification stage tiebreakers

=== Group R ===
Pos	Team	Pld	W	D	L	GF	GA	GD	Pts	Qualification	Bosnia and Herzegovina	Iran	Vietnam	Mauritius	Guyana	Brunei
1	Bosnia and Herzegovina	5	5	0	0	25	6	+19	15	Advance to Tier A		3–1	6–3	3–0	3–1	10–1
2	Iran	5	4	0	1	19	7	+12	12	Advance to Tier B			4–3	2–1	6–0	6–0
3	Vietnam	5	3	0	2	18	12	+6	9	Advance to Tier C				4–1	2–1	6–0
4	Mauritius	5	1	1	3	8	10	−2	4 (Note: Tied on head-to-head result (Guyana 1–1 Mauritius). Overall goal difference was used as the tiebreaker.)	Advance to Tier D					1–1	5–0
5	Guyana	5	1	1	3	6	12	−6	4	Advance to Tier E						3–0
6	Brunei	5	0	0	5	1	30	−29	0	Advance to Tier F						

Source: FIFA
Rules for classification: Qualification stage tiebreakers

=== Group S ===
Pos	Team	Pld	W	D	L	GF	GA	GD	Pts	Qualification	Egypt	Iraq	Trinidad and Tobago	Macau	Saint Kitts and Nevis	Cayman Islands
1	Egypt	5	5	0	0	26	2	+24	15	Advance to Tier A		4–1	4–1	8–0	1–0	9–0
2	Iraq	5	4	0	1	18	5	+13	12	Advance to Tier B			2–1	5–0	5–0	5–0
3	Trinidad and Tobago	5	3	0	2	16	7	+9	9	Advance to Tier C				4–0	3–1	7–0
4	Macau	5	2	0	3	4	19	−15	6	Advance to Tier D					2–1	2–1
5	Saint Kitts and Nevis	5	1	0	4	5	12	−7	3	Advance to Tier E						3–1
6	Cayman Islands	5	0	0	5	2	26	−24	0	Advance to Tier F						

Source: FIFA
Rules for classification: Qualification stage tiebreakers

=== Group T ===
Pos	Team	Pld	W	D	L	GF	GA	GD	Pts	Qualification	Venezuela	Madagascar	Mozambique	Somalia	Puerto Rico	New Zealand
1	Venezuela	5	4	1	0	16	2	+14	13	Advance to Tier A		1–0	1–1	5–1	4–0	5–0
2	Madagascar	5	4	0	1	12	8	+4	12	Advance to Tier B			2–0	2–1	4–3	4–3
3	Mozambique	5	3	1	1	10	9	+1	10	Advance to Tier C				2–1	6–5	1–0
4	Somalia	5	1	0	4	8	13	−5	3 (Note: Tied on head-to-head points. Head-to-head goal difference was used as the tiebreaker (Somalia +1, Puerto Rico 0, New Zealand −1).)	Advance to Tier D					3–1	2–3
5	Puerto Rico	5	1	0	4	13	19	−6	3	Advance to Tier E						4–2
6	New Zealand	5	1	0	4	8	16	−8	3	Advance to Tier F						

Source: FIFA
Rules for classification: Qualification stage tiebreakers

=== Group U ===
Pos	Team	Pld	W	D	L	GF	GA	GD	Pts	Qualification	Ecuador	Kyrgyzstan	Uganda	Cape Verde	Equatorial Guinea	Tonga
1	Ecuador	5	4	1	0	17	1	+16	13	Advance to Tier A		3–0	1–1	1–0	6–0	6–0
2	Kyrgyzstan	5	3	1	1	20	9	+11	10 (Note: Head-to-head result: Kyrgyzstan 4–3 Uganda.)	Advance to Tier B			4–3	2–2	6–1	8–0
3	Uganda	5	3	1	1	27	6	+21	10	Advance to Tier C				5–1	6–0	12–0
4	Cape Verde	5	2	1	2	14	9	+5	7	Advance to Tier D					4–1	7–0
5	Equatorial Guinea	5	1	0	4	3	22	−19	3	Advance to Tier E						1–0
6	Tonga	5	0	0	5	0	34	−34	0	Advance to Tier F						

Source: FIFA
Rules for classification: Qualification stage tiebreakers

=== Group V ===
Pos	Team	Pld	W	D	L	GF	GA	GD	Pts	Qualification	Paraguay		Gibraltar	French Polynesia	Seychelles
1	Paraguay	4	4	0	0	18	4	+14	12	Advance to Tier A		3–2	3–1	8–0	4–1
2	Bolivia	4	3	0	1	10	5	+5	9	Advance to Tier B			2–0	5–2	1–0
3	Gibraltar	4	1	1	2	6	8	−2	4	Advance to Tier C				2–0	3–3
4	Tahiti	4	1	0	3	7	19	−12	3	Advance to Tier D					5–4
5	Seychelles	4	0	1	3	8	13	−5	1	Advance to Tier E					

Source: FIFA
Rules for classification: Qualification stage tiebreakers

=== Group W ===
Pos	Team	Pld	W	D	L	GF	GA	GD	Pts	Qualification	Ghana	Uzbekistan	Kazakhstan	Myanmar	Guam	Bahamas
1	Ghana	5	5	0	0	27	3	+24	15	Advance to Tier A		4–1	2–1	7–1	7–0	7–0
2	Uzbekistan	5	4	0	1	19	5	+14	12	Advance to Tier B			2–0	4–0	6–0	6–1
3	Kazakhstan	5	2	1	2	13	7	+6	7 (Note: Tied on head-to-head result (Kazakhstan 1–1 Myanmar). Overall goal difference was used as the tiebreaker.)	Advance to Tier C				1–1	5–1	6–1
4	Myanmar	5	2	1	2	7	13	−6	7	Advance to Tier D					3–0	2–1
5	Guam	5	1	0	4	2	21	−19	3	Advance to Tier E						1–0
6	Bahamas	5	0	0	5	3	22	−19	0	Advance to Tier F						

Source: FIFA
Rules for classification: Qualification stage tiebreakers

=== Group X ===
Pos	Team	Pld	W	D	L	GF	GA	GD	Pts	Qualification	Uruguay	Zambia	Moldova	Tanzania	Comoros	Montserrat
1	Uruguay	5	4	0	1	20	4	+16	12 (Note: Head-to-head result: Uruguay 3–1 Zambia.)	Advance to Tier A		3–1	0–1	1–0	4–2	12–0
2	Zambia	5	4	0	1	22	7	+15	12	Advance to Tier B			2–1	3–1	3–2	13–0
3	Moldova	5	2	2	1	9	5	+4	8	Advance to Tier C				0–0	2–2	5–1
4	Tanzania	5	2	1	2	11	7	+4	7	Advance to Tier D					4–2	6–1
5	Comoros	5	1	1	3	11	14	−3	4	Advance to Tier E						3–1
6	Montserrat	5	0	0	5	3	39	−36	0	Advance to Tier F						

Source: FIFA
Rules for classification: Qualification stage tiebreakers

=== Group Y ===
Pos	Team	Pld	W	D	L	GF	GA	GD	Pts	Qualification	Albania	Côte d'Ivoire	Rwanda	Mauritania	Turks and Caicos Islands	Vanuatu
1	Albania	5	5	0	0	21	3	+18	15	Advance to Tier A		2–0	4–0	4–1	6–2	5–0
2	Ivory Coast	5	4	0	1	27	2	+25	12	Advance to Tier B			5–0	5–0	6–0	11–0
3	Rwanda	5	3	0	2	12	11	+1	9	Advance to Tier C				2–1	4–1	6–0
4	Mauritania	5	1	1	3	6	14	−8	4 (Note: Tied on head-to-head result (Mauritania 3–3 Turks and Caicos Islands). Overall goal difference was used as the tiebreaker.)	Advance to Tier D					3–3	1–0
5	Turks and Caicos Islands	5	1	1	3	9	21	−12	4	Advance to Tier E						3–2
6	Vanuatu	5	0	0	5	2	26	−24	0	Advance to Tier F						

Source: FIFA
Rules for classification: Qualification stage tiebreakers

=== Group Z ===
Pos	Team	Pld	W	D	L	GF	GA	GD	Pts	Qualification	Kenya	Niger	Panama	North Macedonia	Chad	Malta
1	Kenya	5	3	2	0	18	9	+9	11	Advance to Tier A		2–2	5–1	2–2	3–2	6–2
2	Niger	5	3	1	1	11	6	+5	10	Advance to Tier B			1–3	5–0	2–1	1–0
3	Panama	5	3	0	2	10	11	−1	9	Advance to Tier C				1–4	3–1	2–0
4	North Macedonia	5	2	1	2	10	11	−1	7	Advance to Tier D					1–2	3–1
5	Chad	5	1	1	3	7	10	−3	4	Advance to Tier E						1–1
6	Malta	5	0	1	4	4	13	−9	1	Advance to Tier F						

Source: FIFA
Rules for classification: Qualification stage tiebreakers

=== Group AA ===
Pos	Team	Pld	W	D	L	GF	GA	GD	Pts	Qualification	Lebanon		Burkina Faso	Antigua and Barbuda
1	Northern Ireland	4	4	0	0	25	2	+23	12	Advance to Tier A	4–0	7–2	4–0	10–0
2	Lebanon	4	3	0	1	13	4	+9	9	Advance to Tier B		6–0	3–0	4–0
3	New Caledonia	4	1	1	2	7	17	−10	4	Advance to Tier C			2–1	3–3
4	Burkina Faso	4	1	0	3	4	11	−7	3	Advance to Tier D				3–2
5	Antigua and Barbuda	4	0	1	3	5	20	−15	1	Advance to Tier E				

Source: FIFA
Rules for classification: Qualification stage tiebreakers

=== Group AB ===
Pos	Team	Pld	W	D	L	GF	GA	GD	Pts	Qualification	Czech Republic	Jamaica	Cuba	Togo	Sri Lanka	United States Virgin Islands
1	Czech Republic	5	5	0	0	38	3	+35	15	Advance to Tier A		5–1	9–1	5–0	5–0	14–1
2	Jamaica	5	4	0	1	20	7	+13	12	Advance to Tier B			1–0	3–2	6–0	9–0
3	Cuba	5	3	0	2	14	12	+2	9	Advance to Tier C				1–0	7–2	5–0
4	Togo	5	2	0	3	13	10	+3	6	Advance to Tier D					5–1	6–0
5	Sri Lanka	5	1	0	4	6	23	−17	3	Advance to Tier E						3–0
6	U.S. Virgin Islands	5	0	0	5	1	37	−36	0	Advance to Tier F						

Source: FIFA
Rules for classification: Qualification stage tiebreakers

=== Group AC ===
Pos	Team	Pld	W	D	L	GF	GA	GD	Pts	Qualification	Poland	Georgia	Namibia	Bermuda	British Virgin Islands	São Tomé and Príncipe
1	Poland	5	5	0	0	45	0	+45	15	Advance to Tier A		4–0	5–0	5–0	11–0	20–0
2	Georgia	5	4	0	1	21	5	+16	12	Advance to Tier B			1–0	1–0	10–0	9–1
3	Namibia	5	3	0	2	13	7	+6	9	Advance to Tier C				2–1	3–0	8–0
4	Bermuda	5	2	0	3	11	9	+2	6	Advance to Tier D					5–0	5–1
5	British Virgin Islands	5	1	0	4	3	29	−26	3	Advance to Tier E						3–0
6	São Tomé and Príncipe	5	0	0	5	2	45	−43	0	Advance to Tier F						

Source: FIFA
Rules for classification: Qualification stage tiebreakers

=== Group AD ===
Pos	Team	Pld	W	D	L	GF	GA	GD	Pts	Qualification	Cyprus	South Sudan	Nigeria	Jordan	Gambia	Pakistan
1	Cyprus	5	3	1	1	14	6	+8	10 (Note: Head-to-head result: Cyprus 4–0 South Sudan.)	Advance to Tier A		4–0	1–2	2–1	3–3	4–0
2	South Sudan	5	3	1	1	7	8	−1	10	Advance to Tier B			3–3	1–0	2–1	1–0
3	Nigeria	5	1	4	0	11	10	+1	7	Advance to Tier C				2–2	3–3	1–1
4	Jordan	5	1	2	2	7	8	−1	5 (Note: Head-to-head result: Gambia 2–3 Jordan.)	Advance to Tier D					3–2	1–1
5	Gambia	5	1	2	2	13	13	0	5	Advance to Tier E						4–2
6	Pakistan	5	0	2	3	4	11	−7	2	Advance to Tier F						

Source: FIFA
Rules for classification: Qualification stage tiebreakers

=== Group AE ===
Pos	Team	Pld	W	D	L	GF	GA	GD	Pts	Qualification	Russia	Turkey	Afghanistan	Sierra Leone	Sudan	Djibouti
1	Russia	5	5	0	0	44	1	+43	15	Advance to Tier A		4–1	8–0	7–0	12–0	13–0
2	Turkey	5	3	0	2	25	13	+12	9 (Note: Head-to-head result: Turkey 4–3 Afghanistan.)	Advance to Tier B			4–3	1–5	8–0	11–1
3	Afghanistan	5	3	0	2	11	16	−5	9	Advance to Tier C				2–1	3–1	3–2
4	Sierra Leone	5	2	1	2	11	10	+1	7	Advance to Tier D					0–0	5–0
5	Sudan	5	1	1	3	5	25	−20	4	Advance to Tier E						4–2
6	Djibouti	5	0	0	5	5	36	−31	0	Advance to Tier F						

Source: FIFA
Rules for classification: Qualification stage tiebreakers

=== Group AF ===
Pos	Team	Pld	W	D	L	GF	GA	GD	Pts	Qualification	Australia	Haiti	Azerbaijan	Andorra	Israel	East Timor
1	Australia	5	5	0	0	24	4	+20	15	Advance to Tier A		3–1		3–1	4–0	11–1
2	Haiti	5	4	0	1	17	6	+11	12	Advance to Tier B				2–1	4–2	6–0
3	Azerbaijan (H)	5	3	0	2	11	8	+3	9	Advance to Tier C	1–3	0–4		1–0	3–1	6–0
4	Andorra	5	1	1	3	5	6	−1	4 (Note: Tied on head-to-head result (Israel 0–0 Andorra). Overall goal difference was used as the tiebreaker.)	Advance to Tier D					0–0	3–0
5	Israel	5	1	1	3	5	12	−7	4	Advance to Tier E						2–1
6	Timor-Leste	5	0	0	5	2	28	−26	0	Advance to Tier F						

Source: FIFA
Rules for classification: Qualification stage tiebreakers
(H) Hosts

== Tournament stage ==
The tournament stage is being played from 28 to 30 October 2026, with the tier finals on the final day at Baku Crystal Hall. Teams were placed in six tiers according to their finishing position in the qualification stage and play a cross-elimination format within their tier, in which winners meet winners and losing teams meet other losing teams. Matches that are level at full time are decided by a penalty shoot-out, with no extra time. Each team plays four to five matches in the tournament stage. Following the qualification stage, the group winners contested Tier A, the runners-up Tier B, and so on down to Tier F.

A draw took place to determine the round of 32 pairings.

=== Tier A ===
17th-place match
Peru	2 (5)
Albania (p)	2 (6)
19th-place match
Russia	7
Bosnia and Herzegovina	0
21st-place match
Republic of Ireland	3
Wales	2
23rd-place match
Cameroon	2
Australia	0
25th-place match
South Korea	3
Kenya	1
27th-place match
Northern Ireland	4
Algeria	1
29th-place match
Cyprus	0
Bulgaria	4
31st-place match
Angola	3
Estonia	2

17th–20th semi-finals
Peru (p)	3 (5)
Russia	3 (4)
Bosnia and Herzegovina	3
Albania	4
21st–24th semi-finals
Republic of Ireland (p)	4 (6)
Cameroon	4 (5)
Wales	5
Australia	3
25th–28th semi-finals
Northern Ireland	0
South Korea	1
Kenya	4
Algeria	3
29th–32nd semi-finals
Angola	3
Cyprus	4
Bulgaria	2
Estonia	0

17th–24th quarter-finals
Republic of Ireland	1
Peru	3
Cameroon	2
Russia	9
Wales	2 (1)
Bosnia and Herzegovina (p)	2 (3)
Australia	1
Albania	2
25th–32nd quarter-finals
Northern Ireland	7
Angola	5
Cyprus	0
South Korea	4
Bulgaria	2
Kenya	3
Estonia	1
Algeria	2

17th–32nd round of 16
Republic of Ireland	3
Northern Ireland	2
Peru	2
Angola	1
Cameroon	2
Cyprus	1
South Korea	1
Russia	4
Wales	4
Bulgaria	0
Bosnia and Herzegovina	4
Kenya	1
Australia	2
Estonia	1
Albania	4
Algeria	1

Round of 32
Brazil	7
Republic of Ireland	2
Venezuela (p)	1 (5)
Northern Ireland	1 (4)
Italy (p)	1 (4)
Peru	1 (3)
Czech Republic	5
Angola	1
Morocco	4
Cameroon	1
Paraguay	4
Cyprus	0
South Korea	1
Ghana	2
Mexico	3
Russia	2
Spain (p)	1 (4)
Wales	1 (3)
Ecuador (p)	1 (3)
Bulgaria	1 (2)
Colombia	2
Bosnia and Herzegovina	1
Poland	4
Kenya	0
Australia	2
Greece	7
Uruguay	6
Estonia	0
Egypt	2
Albania	1
Algeria	0 (2)
Guinea (p)	0 (4)

Round of 16
Brazil (p)	0 (11)
Venezuela	0 (10)
Italy	3
Czech Republic	5
Morocco	0
Paraguay	1
Ghana	5
Mexico	2
Spain	4
Ecuador	1
Colombia	5
Poland	3
Greece (p)	1 (4)
Uruguay	1 (2)
Egypt	2
Guinea	4

Quarter-finals
Brazil	2 (2)
Czech Republic (p)	2 (4)
Paraguay (p)	2 (7)
Ghana	2 (6)
Spain	5
Colombia	0
Greece	2
Guinea	1
9th–16th quarter-finals
Venezuela	2
Italy	3
Morocco	0
Mexico	3
Ecuador	0
Poland	4
Uruguay	3
Egypt	0

Semi-finals
Czech Republic	2
Paraguay	0
Spain	6
Greece	2
5th–8th semi-finals
Brazil	7
Ghana	1
Colombia	2 (3)
Guinea (p)	2 (4)
9th–12th semi-finals
Italy	0
Mexico	7
Poland	0
Uruguay	1
13th–16th semi-finals
Venezuela	3
Morocco	4
Ecuador	1 (4)
Egypt (p)	1 (5)

Final
Czech Republic	0
Spain	3
3rd-place match
Paraguay	2
Greece	6
5th-place match
Brazil	4
Guinea	2
7th-place match
Ghana	4
Colombia	0
9th-place match
Mexico	3
Uruguay	1
11th-place match
Italy	1
Poland	3
13th-place match
Morocco	3
Egypt	1
15th-place match
Venezuela	3
Ecuador	1

==== Final (1st-place match) ====
30 October 2026
18:00

Czech Republic	0–3	Spain
	Report

Baku Crystal Hall, Baku

=== Tier B ===
49th-place match
China	1 (4)
Turkey (p)	1 (5)
51st-place match
Kyrgyzstan	4
Guatemala	5
53rd-place match
Qatar	1
Latvia	0
55th-place match
Malaysia	0
Lebanon	2
57th-place match
Bolivia	2
England	3
59th-place match
Congo	5
Georgia	2
61st-place match
Haiti	3
Iraq	0
63rd-place match
Jamaica	3
El Salvador	2

49th–52nd semi-finals
Kyrgyzstan	1
China	6
Turkey	8
Guatemala	4
53rd–56th semi-finals
Qatar (p)	0 (5)
Malaysia	0 (4)
Lebanon	0
Latvia	3
57th–60th semi-finals
Bolivia (p)	2 (5)
Congo	2 (4)
England	2
Georgia	0
61st–64th semi-finals
Haiti	1
Jamaica	0
El Salvador	2
Iraq	3

49th–56th quarter-finals
Kyrgyzstan	2
Qatar	1
Malaysia	1
China	3
Turkey	1
Lebanon	0
Latvia	1 (3)
Guatemala (p)	1 (4)
57th–64th quarter-finals
Bolivia	2
Haiti	1
Jamaica	1
Congo	4
England	4
El Salvador	0
Georgia (p)	2 (4)
Iraq	2 (3)

49th–64th round of 16
Bolivia	3
Kyrgyzstan	4
Haiti	0
Qatar	1
Jamaica	2
Malaysia	4
China	3
Congo	2
England	1
Turkey	3
El Salvador	2
Lebanon	3
Georgia	1
Latvia	5
Guatemala (p)	1 (4)
Iraq	1 (3)

33rd–64th round of 32
Argentina	4
Bolivia	2
Ivory Coast	4
Kyrgyzstan	0
Croatia	4
Haiti	3
Qatar	1
South Sudan	2
Portugal	3
Jamaica	1
South Africa	6
Malaysia	2
Iran	2
China	1
United Arab Emirates	2
Congo	0
England	2
Zambia	3
Turkey	1 (3)
Niger (p)	1 (4)
Mali	3
El Salvador	0
Slovakia	3
Lebanon	2
Senegal	4
Georgia	1
Costa Rica	4
Latvia	3
Uzbekistan	4
Guatemala	1
Iraq	1
Madagascar	2

33rd–48th round of 16
Argentina	2
Ivory Coast	1
Croatia	5
South Sudan	1
Portugal	2
South Africa	1
Iran	3
United Arab Emirates	2
Zambia	2
Niger	0
Mali	2
Slovakia	4
Senegal	6
Costa Rica	1
Uzbekistan	1
Madagascar	4

33rd–40th quarter-finals
Argentina	4
Croatia	1
Portugal	3
Iran	2
Zambia	3
Slovakia	1
Senegal	4
Madagascar	0
41st–48th quarter-finals
Ivory Coast	2
South Sudan	1
South Africa	5
United Arab Emirates	1
Niger	2
Mali	0
Costa Rica	1
Uzbekistan	2

33rd–36th semi-finals
Argentina	1
Portugal	3
Zambia	4
Senegal	3
37th–40th semi-finals
Croatia	0
Iran	1
Slovakia	1
Madagascar	2
41st–44th semi-finals
Ivory Coast	4
South Africa	3
Niger	3
Uzbekistan	4
45th–48th semi-finals
South Sudan	0
United Arab Emirates	1
Mali	5
Costa Rica	1

33rd-place match
Portugal	2
Zambia	5
35th-place match
Argentina (p)	1 (5)
Senegal	1 (4)
37th-place match
Iran	3
Madagascar	4
39th-place match
Croatia	1
Slovakia	0
41st-place match
Ivory Coast	1
Uzbekistan	0
43rd-place match
South Africa	2
Niger	3
45th-place match
United Arab Emirates	0
Mali	1
47th-place match
South Sudan	1
Costa Rica	10

==== Final (33rd-place match) ====
30 October 2026
15:00

Portugal	2–5	Zambia
	Report

Baku Crystal Hall, Baku

=== Tier C ===
81st-place match
Hungary	3
Vietnam	2
83rd-place match
Afghanistan (p)	3 (3)
Azerbaijan	3 (2)
85th-place match
Kazakhstan	4
Mozambique	1
87th-place match
India	6
Cuba	4
89th-place match
Moldova	3
Yemen	0
91st-place match
Namibia	4
Nicaragua	2
93rd-place match
Trinidad and Tobago	1
Gibraltar	2
95th-place match
Liberia	9
New Caledonia	1

81st–84th semi-finals
Afghanistan	2 (4)
Hungary (p)	2 (5)
Azerbaijan	2
Vietnam	4
85th–88th semi-finals
India	5 (4)
Kazakhstan (p)	5 (5)
Mozambique	2
Cuba	1
89th–92nd semi-finals
Namibia	0
Moldova	4
Yemen	5
Nicaragua	2
93rd–96th semi-finals
Trinidad and Tobago	2
Liberia	1
Gibraltar	2
New Caledonia	1

81st–88th quarter-finals
India	1
Afghanistan	2
Kazakhstan	4
Hungary	5
Mozambique	1
Azerbaijan	4
Cuba	1
Vietnam	2
89th–96th quarter-finals
Trinidad and Tobago	1
Namibia	4
Moldova	4
Liberia	0
Yemen (p)	2 (4)
Gibraltar	2 (2)
New Caledonia	2
Nicaragua	5

81st–96th round of 16
Trinidad and Tobago	2
India	3
Namibia	2
Afghanistan	6
Kazakhstan	4
Moldova	2
Hungary	5
Liberia	1
Mozambique (p)	0 (4)
Yemen	0 (3)
Azerbaijan	5
Gibraltar	1
New Caledonia	1
Cuba	8
Nicaragua	3
Vietnam	5

65th–96th round of 32
France	4
Trinidad and Tobago	2
Honduras	2
India	1
Tunisia	4
Namibia	0
Thailand	6
Afghanistan	4
Panama	7
Kazakhstan	0
Indonesia (p)	3 (9)
Moldova	3 (8)
Hungary	0
Malawi	2
Luxembourg	8
Liberia	2
Japan	1
Mozambique	0
Uganda	5
Yemen	2
Chile	3
Azerbaijan	1
Belarus	6
Gibraltar	0
Nigeria	7
New Caledonia	0
Benin	4
Cuba	0
Scotland	4
Nicaragua	2
Vietnam	2 (2)
Rwanda (p)	2 (4)

65th–80th round of 16
France (p)	2 (4)
Honduras	2 (3)
Tunisia	5
Thailand	0
Panama	3
Indonesia	5
Malawi	2
Luxembourg	7
Japan	0
Uganda	4
Chile	1
Belarus	2
Nigeria	3
Benin	6
Scotland	2
Rwanda	1

65th–72nd quarter-finals
France	3
Tunisia	5
Indonesia	1
Luxembourg	6
Uganda	1
Belarus	5
Benin	0
Scotland	6
73rd–80th quarter-finals
Honduras	5
Thailand	0
Panama	4
Malawi	0
Japan	3 (4)
Chile (p)	3 (5)
Nigeria (p)	1 (4)
Rwanda	1 (3)

65th–68th semi-finals
Tunisia	3
Luxembourg	0
Belarus	1
Scotland	0
69th–72nd semi-finals
France	5
Indonesia	1
Uganda	5
Benin	1
73rd–76th semi-finals
Honduras	4
Panama	1
Chile (p)	3 (3)
Nigeria	3 (2)
77th–80th semi-finals
Thailand	6
Malawi	2
Japan	3
Rwanda	0

65th-place match
Tunisia	0
Belarus	3
67th-place match
Luxembourg	3
Scotland	5
69th-place match
France	1 (2)
Uganda (p)	1 (4)
71st-place match
Indonesia	0
Benin	1
73rd-place match
Honduras	0
Chile	4
75th-place match
Panama	2
Nigeria	1
77th-place match
Thailand	4
Japan	0
79th-place match
Malawi	2
Rwanda	0

==== Final (65th-place match) ====
30 October 2026
13:30

Tunisia	0–3	Belarus
	Report

Baku Crystal Hall, Baku

=== Tier D ===
113th-place match
Tanzania	1
North Macedonia	2
115th-place match
Syria	2
Lesotho	0
117th-place match
Jordan	0
Bermuda	2
119th-place match
Mauritius	2
Bahrain	0
121st-place match
Turkmenistan (p)	1 (5)
Mauritania	1 (4)
123rd-place match
Botswana	7
Tahiti	1
125th-place match
Myanmar	4
Burkina Faso	1
127th-place match
Togo	5
Macau	1

113th–116th semi-finals
Syria	2
Tanzania	5
Lesotho	2
North Macedonia	3
117th–120th semi-finals
Jordan	3
Mauritius	2
Bahrain	0
Bermuda	4
121st–124th semi-finals
Turkmenistan	4
Botswana	2
Tahiti	1
Mauritania	5
125th–128th semi-finals
Togo	2
Myanmar	3
Burkina Faso	4
Macau	1

113th–120th quarter-finals
Syria	3
Jordan	1
Tanzania	3
Mauritius	2
Bahrain	1
Lesotho	2
North Macedonia	5
Bermuda	0
121st–128th quarter-finals
Turkmenistan	1
Togo	0
Botswana	4
Myanmar	3
Burkina Faso	1
Tahiti	2
Mauritania	2
Macau	1

113th–128th round of 16
Turkmenistan	0
Syria	3
Jordan (p)	1 (4)
Togo	1 (2)
Botswana	1
Tanzania	4
Myanmar	0 (5)
Mauritius (p)	0 (6)
Burkina Faso	1
Bahrain	2
Tahiti	3 (4)
Lesotho (p)	3 (5)
North Macedonia	5
Mauritania	0
Bermuda	6
Macau	1

97th–128th round of 32
Canada	4
Turkmenistan	0
Syria	1
Andorra	2
Jordan	1
Cape Verde	3
Togo	3
Burundi	4
Saudi Arabia	2
Botswana	0
Tanzania	1
Somalia	3
Oman	3
Myanmar	0
DR Congo	4
Mauritius	1
Burkina Faso	0
Dominican Republic	3
Bahrain	1
Aruba	2
Kosovo	4
Tahiti	0
Sierra Leone	1
Lesotho	0
North Macedonia	1
Lithuania	3
Mauritania	2 (2)
Zimbabwe (p)	2 (4)
Tajikistan	7
Bermuda	1
Philippines	2
Macau	0

97th–112th round of 16
Canada	6
Andorra	1
Cape Verde	1
Burundi	2
Saudi Arabia	1
Somalia	2
Oman	0
DR Congo	2
Dominican Republic (p)	2 (3)
Aruba	2 (0)
Kosovo	1
Sierra Leone	0
Lithuania	7
Zimbabwe	3
Tajikistan	3
Philippines	0

97th–104th quarter-finals
Canada	7
Burundi	0
Somalia	4
DR Congo	0
Dominican Republic (p)	1 (3)
Kosovo	1 (2)
Lithuania	2
Tajikistan	5
105th–112th quarter-finals
Andorra	0
Cape Verde	4
Saudi Arabia	0
Oman	4
Aruba	1
Sierra Leone	3
Zimbabwe	3
Philippines	2

97th–100th semi-finals
Canada	5
Somalia	2
Dominican Republic	0
Tajikistan	3
101st–104th semi-finals
Burundi	1
DR Congo	4
Kosovo	2
Lithuania	5
105th–108th semi-finals
Cape Verde	0
Oman	4
Sierra Leone	3
Zimbabwe	0
109th–112th semi-finals
Andorra	3
Saudi Arabia	2
Aruba	2
Philippines	5

97th-place match
Canada	2
Tajikistan	4
99th-place match
Somalia	1
Dominican Republic	4
101st-place match
DR Congo	6
Lithuania	4
103rd-place match
Burundi	1
Kosovo	6
105th-place match
Oman	1
Sierra Leone	2
107th-place match
Cape Verde	1
Zimbabwe	2
109th-place match
Andorra	2
Philippines	1
111th-place match
Saudi Arabia	2
Aruba	3

==== Final (97th-place match) ====
30 October 2026
12:00

Canada	2–4	Tajikistan
	Report

Baku Crystal Hall, Baku

=== Tier E ===
145th-place match
Guinea-Bissau	4
Chinese Taipei	1
147th-place match
Guam	2
Seychelles	3
149th-place match
Guyana	8
Saint Kitts and Nevis	0
151st-place match
Belize	2 (2)
Mongolia (p)	2 (4)
153rd-place match
Laos	9
Antigua and Barbuda	3
155th-place match
Dominica	2 (3)
Comoros (p)	2 (5)
157th-place match
Turks and Caicos Islands	2
Sri Lanka	1
159th-place match
Maldives	2
British Virgin Islands	0

145th–148th semi-finals
Guinea-Bissau	2
Guam	1
Seychelles	0
Chinese Taipei	3
149th–152nd semi-finals
Belize	2
Guyana	3
Mongolia	1 (2)
Saint Kitts and Nevis (p)	1 (4)
153rd–156th semi-finals
Laos	4
Dominica	2
Antigua and Barbuda	2
Comoros	1
157th–160th semi-finals
Turks and Caicos Islands	4
Maldives	2
British Virgin Islands	1
Sri Lanka	2

145th–152nd quarter-finals
Guinea-Bissau	4
Belize	0
Guam (p)	1 (5)
Guyana	1 (4)
Mongolia	2
Seychelles	3
Chinese Taipei	3
Saint Kitts and Nevis	2
153rd–160th quarter-finals
Laos	4
Turks and Caicos Islands	1
Maldives	1
Dominica	8
Antigua and Barbuda	3
British Virgin Islands	0
Comoros	2
Sri Lanka	0

145th–160th round of 16
Laos	1
Guinea-Bissau	3
Turks and Caicos Islands	2
Belize	3
Guam	2
Maldives	0
Guyana	3
Dominica	1
Mongolia	6
Antigua and Barbuda	0
British Virgin Islands	0
Seychelles	3
Comoros	1 (1)
Chinese Taipei (p)	1 (4)
Saint Kitts and Nevis (p)	3 (4)
Sri Lanka	3 (2)

129th–160th round of 32
Israel	3
Laos	2
Puerto Rico	3
Guinea-Bissau	1
Central African Republic	5
Turks and Caicos Islands	0
Belize	1 (3)
Equatorial Guinea (p)	1 (4)
Palestine	2
Guam	1
Maldives	0
Eswatini	3
Guyana	1
Gambia	5
Dominica	1
Chad	5
Montenegro (p)	1 (4)
Mongolia	1 (2)
Antigua and Barbuda	1
Hong Kong	5
Singapore	9
British Virgin Islands	0
Bangladesh (p)	1 (4)
Seychelles	1 (2)
Kuwait	1
Comoros	0
Chinese Taipei	2
Saint Vincent and the Grenadines	4
Saint Kitts and Nevis	3 (1)
Sudan (p)	3 (4)
Gabon	3
Sri Lanka	2

129th–144th round of 16
Israel	0
Puerto Rico	3
Central African Republic	3
Equatorial Guinea	0
Palestine	4
Eswatini	2
Gambia	1 (5)
Chad (p)	1 (6)
Montenegro (p)	3 (4)
Hong Kong	3 (2)
Singapore	1 (3)
Bangladesh (p)	1 (4)
Kuwait	4
Saint Vincent and the Grenadines	2
Sudan	0
Gabon	4

129th–136th quarter-finals
Puerto Rico	1
Central African Republic	2
Palestine	0
Chad	4
Montenegro	0
Bangladesh	4
Kuwait	0 (4)
Gabon (p)	0 (5)
137th–144th quarter-finals
Israel	2
Equatorial Guinea	1
Eswatini	1
Gambia	6
Hong Kong	7
Singapore	0
Saint Vincent and the Grenadines	1 (5)
Sudan (p)	1 (6)

129th–132nd semi-finals
Central African Republic (p)	1 (5)
Chad	1 (4)
Bangladesh	1
Gabon	0
133rd–136th semi-finals
Puerto Rico	3 (2)
Palestine (p)	3 (4)
Montenegro	3
Kuwait	1
137th–140th semi-finals
Israel (p)	0 (4)
Gambia	0 (2)
Hong Kong	4
Sudan	0
141st–144th semi-finals
Equatorial Guinea	0
Eswatini	1
Singapore	8
Saint Vincent and the Grenadines	3

129th-place match
Central African Republic	4
Bangladesh	1
131st-place match
Chad	2
Gabon	0
133rd-place match
Palestine	1
Montenegro	3
135th-place match
Puerto Rico	1
Kuwait	3
137th-place match
Israel (p)	2 (5)
Hong Kong	2 (3)
139th-place match
Gambia	5
Sudan	1
141st-place match
Eswatini	1
Singapore	4
143rd-place match
Equatorial Guinea	3
Saint Vincent and the Grenadines	1

==== Final (129th-place match) ====
30 October 2026
10:30

Central African Republic	4–1	Bangladesh
	Report

Baku Crystal Hall, Baku

=== Tier F ===
177th-place match
Suriname	2
Barbados	4
179th-place match
Solomon Islands	3
Papua New Guinea	4
181st-place match
Saint Lucia	6
Bhutan	0
183rd-place match
American Samoa	0
Cayman Islands	3
185th-place match
Tonga	1
Cambodia	7
187th-place match
Brunei	2
Anguilla	1

177th–180th semi-finals
Suriname	4
Solomon Islands	1
Papua New Guinea	2
Barbados	6
181st–184th semi-finals
Saint Lucia	6
American Samoa	0
Cayman Islands	1
Bhutan	2
185th–188th semi-finals
Brunei	3
Tonga	4
Cambodia	4
Anguilla	1

177th–184th quarter-finals
Saint Lucia	2
Suriname	3
American Samoa	0
Solomon Islands	6
Papua New Guinea	3
Cayman Islands	1
Bhutan	3
Barbados	5
185th–189th quarter-finals
Bye	—
Brunei	—
Bye	—
Tonga	—
Bye	—
Cambodia	—
Anguilla	3
U.S. Virgin Islands	0

177th–189th round of 16
Bye	—
Saint Lucia	—
Suriname	2
Brunei	0
Bye	—
American Samoa	—
Solomon Islands	2
Tonga	0
Bye	—
Papua New Guinea	—
Cambodia	1 (3)
Cayman Islands (p)	1 (4)
Anguilla	3
Bhutan	4
Barbados	5
U.S. Virgin Islands	0

161st–189th round of 32
New Zealand	—
Bye	—
Cook Islands	2
Saint Lucia	1
Malta	3
Suriname	0
Brunei	2 (4)
São Tomé and Príncipe (p)	2 (5)
Fiji	—
Bye	—
American Samoa	0
Bahamas	6
Nepal	4
Solomon Islands	0
Tonga	1
Pakistan	6
Curaçao	—
Bye	—
Samoa	5
Papua New Guinea	3
Cambodia	2
Ethiopia	3
Cayman Islands	2
Djibouti	4
Vanuatu (p)	0 (5)
Anguilla	0 (3)
Bhutan	1 (6)
Montserrat (p)	1 (7)
Barbados	2 (4)
Grenada (p)	2 (5)
U.S. Virgin Islands	1
Timor-Leste	3

161st–176th round of 16
New Zealand	3
Cook Islands	0
Malta	6
São Tomé and Príncipe	0
Fiji	5
Bahamas	1
Nepal (p)	0 (4)
Pakistan	0 (3)
Curaçao	1
Samoa	2
Ethiopia	4
Djibouti	2
Vanuatu	2
Montserrat	1
Grenada	3
Timor-Leste	2

161st–168th quarter-finals
New Zealand	2
Malta	1
Fiji	1
Nepal	2
Samoa	1 (5)
Ethiopia (p)	1 (6)
Vanuatu	1
Grenada	4
169th–176th quarter-finals
Cook Islands	4
São Tomé and Príncipe	0
Bahamas	0
Pakistan	5
Curaçao	2
Djibouti	4
Montserrat	4
Timor-Leste	1

161st–164th semi-finals
New Zealand (p)	1 (3)
Nepal	1 (2)
Ethiopia	3
Grenada	1
165th–168th semi-finals
Malta	4
Fiji	0
Samoa (p)	2 (4)
Vanuatu	2 (3)
169th–172nd semi-finals
Cook Islands	1
Pakistan	7
Djibouti (p)	2 (7)
Montserrat	2 (6)
173rd–176th semi-finals
São Tomé and Príncipe	3
Bahamas	2
Curaçao	1
Timor-Leste	2

161st-place match
New Zealand	2
Ethiopia	1
163rd-place match
Nepal	2
Grenada	1
165th-place match
Malta	3
Samoa	0
167th-place match
Fiji	5
Vanuatu	2
169th-place match
Pakistan	4
Djibouti	2
171st-place match
Cook Islands	2
Montserrat	1
173rd-place match
São Tomé and Príncipe	0
Timor-Leste	3
175th-place match
Bahamas	0
Curaçao	6

Notes
The loser of match 683, U.S. Virgin Islands, in the 185th–189th quarter-finals was ranked 189th.

==== Final (161st-place match) ====
30 October 2026
09:00

New Zealand	2–1	Ethiopia
	Report

Baku Crystal Hall, Baku

== Tournament ranking ==
Per statistical convention in football, matches decided by penalty shoot-outs are counted as draws.

Pos	Grp	Team	Pld	W	D	L	GF	GA	GD	Pts	Tier
1st place, gold medalist(s)	E	Spain	10	9	1	0	42	9	+33	28	Tier A
2nd place, silver medalist(s)	AB	Czech Republic	10	8	1	1	52	12	+40	25	Tier A
3rd place, bronze medalist(s)	N	Greece	10	8	1	1	39	17	+22	25	Tier A
4	V	Paraguay	9	6	1	2	27	14	+13	19	Tier A
5	D	Brazil	10	8	2	0	45	9	+36	26	Tier A
6	P	Guinea	10	5	3	2	38	14	+24	18	Tier A
7	W	Ghana	10	8	1	1	41	15	+26	25	Tier A
8	M	Colombia	10	6	2	2	35	18	+17	20	Tier A
9	H	Mexico	10	9	0	1	42	10	+32	27	Tier A
10	X	Uruguay	10	7	1	2	32	8	+24	22	Tier A
11	AC	Poland	10	8	0	2	59	7	+52	24	Tier A
12	L	Italy	10	6	1	3	38	22	+16	19	Tier A
13	F	Morocco	10	8	0	2	35	12	+23	24	Tier A
14	S	Egypt	10	6	1	3	32	14	+18	19	Tier A
15	T	Venezuela	10	5	3	2	25	11	+14	18	Tier A
16	U	Ecuador	10	4	3	3	21	14	+7	15	Tier A
17	Y	Albania	10	8	1	1	34	12	+22	25	Tier A
18	O	Peru	10	6	4	0	30	11	+19	22	Tier A
19	AE	Russia	10	8	1	1	69	10	+59	25	Tier A
20	R	Bosnia and Herzegovina	10	6	1	3	35	22	+13	19	Tier A
21	C	Republic of Ireland	10	6	2	2	33	26	+7	20	Tier A
22	G	Wales	10	6	3	1	32	12	+20	21	Tier A
23	K	Cameroon	10	6	1	3	27	22	+5	19	Tier A
24	AF	Australia	10	6	0	4	32	21	+11	18	Tier A
25	Q	South Korea	10	7	0	3	31	13	+18	21	Tier A
26	Z	Kenya	10	5	2	3	27	25	+2	17	Tier A
27	AA	Northern Ireland	9	6	1	2	39	13	+26	19	Tier A
28	B	Algeria	10	5	2	3	25	16	+9	17	Tier A
29	I	Bulgaria	9	6	1	2	23	15	+8	19	Tier A
30	AD	Cyprus	10	4	1	5	19	23	−4	13	Tier A
31	J	Angola	10	6	0	4	30	26	+4	18	Tier A
32	A	Estonia	10	3	2	5	17	18	−1	11	Tier A
33	X	Zambia	10	9	0	1	39	15	+24	27	Tier B
34	G	Portugal	10	8	0	2	28	14	+14	24	Tier B
35	B	Argentina	10	7	1	2	25	12	+13	22	Tier B
36	K	Senegal	10	7	1	2	47	13	+34	22	Tier B
37	T	Madagascar	10	8	0	2	24	18	+6	24	Tier B
38	R	Iran	10	7	0	3	30	17	+13	21	Tier B
39	N	Croatia	10	6	1	3	26	18	+8	19	Tier B
40	M	Slovakia	10	6	0	4	29	16	+13	18	Tier B
41	Y	Ivory Coast	10	8	0	2	39	8	+31	24	Tier B
42	W	Uzbekistan	10	7	0	3	30	15	+15	21	Tier B
43	Z	Niger	10	5	2	3	20	15	+5	17	Tier B
44	A	South Africa	10	5	1	4	42	17	+25	16	Tier B
45	O	Mali	10	7	0	3	33	12	+21	21	Tier B
46	Q	United Arab Emirates	10	6	0	4	18	11	+7	18	Tier B
47	F	Costa Rica	10	6	0	4	60	26	+34	18	Tier B
48	AD	South Sudan	10	4	1	5	12	27	−15	13	Tier B
49	AE	Turkey	10	6	2	2	39	20	+19	20	Tier B
50	J	China	10	6	2	2	34	16	+18	20	Tier B
51	P	Guatemala	10	4	3	3	28	23	+5	15	Tier B
52	U	Kyrgyzstan	10	5	1	4	31	28	+3	16	Tier B
53	L	Qatar	10	5	2	3	16	10	+6	17	Tier B
54	I	Latvia	9	4	2	3	26	13	+13	14	Tier B
55	AA	Lebanon	9	5	0	4	20	13	+7	15	Tier B
56	H	Malaysia	10	4	2	4	19	17	+2	14	Tier B
57	C	England	10	7	0	3	31	13	+18	21	Tier B
58	V	Bolivia	9	4	1	4	21	19	+2	13	Tier B
59	E	Congo	10	6	1	3	28	18	+10	19	Tier B
60	AC	Georgia	10	4	1	5	27	23	+4	13	Tier B
61	AF	Haiti	10	6	0	4	25	13	+12	18	Tier B
62	S	Iraq	10	5	2	3	25	15	+10	17	Tier B
63	AB	Jamaica	10	5	0	5	27	21	+6	15	Tier B
64	D	El Salvador	10	3	0	7	13	29	−16	9	Tier B
65	O	Belarus	10	8	1	1	54	6	+48	25	Tier C
66	D	Tunisia	10	7	0	3	31	16	+15	21	Tier C
67	I	Scotland	9	6	1	2	28	12	+16	19	Tier C
68	Q	Luxembourg	10	7	0	3	43	20	+23	21	Tier C
69	U	Uganda	10	6	2	2	43	15	+28	20	Tier C
70	A	France	10	5	3	2	35	17	+18	18	Tier C
71	L	Benin	10	5	1	4	30	25	+5	16	Tier C
72	G	Indonesia	10	3	2	5	25	26	−1	11	Tier C
73	E	Chile	10	4	3	3	29	17	+12	15	Tier C
74	P	Honduras	10	6	2	2	39	14	+25	20	Tier C
75	Z	Panama	10	6	0	4	27	21	+6	18	Tier C
76	AD	Nigeria	10	2	6	2	26	22	+4	12	Tier C
77	M	Thailand	10	6	0	4	29	27	+2	18	Tier C
78	J	Japan	10	5	2	3	15	15	0	17	Tier C
79	B	Malawi	10	5	0	5	19	29	−10	15	Tier C
80	Y	Rwanda	10	3	2	5	16	21	−5	11	Tier C
81	H	Hungary	10	5	2	3	23	19	+4	17	Tier C
82	R	Vietnam	10	6	1	3	33	23	+10	19	Tier C
83	AE	Afghanistan	10	5	2	3	28	30	−2	17	Tier C
84	AF	Azerbaijan (H)	10	5	1	4	26	20	+6	16	Tier C
85	W	Kazakhstan	10	4	2	4	30	27	+3	14	Tier C
86	T	Mozambique	10	4	2	4	14	19	−5	14	Tier C
87	K	India	10	5	2	3	30	30	0	17	Tier C
88	AB	Cuba	10	4	0	6	28	27	+1	12	Tier C
89	X	Moldova	10	5	3	2	25	12	+13	18	Tier C
90	N	Yemen	10	4	2	4	24	26	−2	14	Tier C
91	AC	Namibia	10	5	0	5	23	24	−1	15	Tier C
92	C	Nicaragua	10	3	1	6	24	31	−7	10	Tier C
93	V	Gibraltar	9	3	2	4	13	23	−10	11	Tier C
94	S	Trinidad and Tobago	10	4	0	6	24	21	+3	12	Tier C
95	F	Liberia	10	3	1	6	23	38	−15	10	Tier C
96	AA	New Caledonia	9	1	1	7	12	48	−36	4	Tier C
97	E	Tajikistan	10	7	1	2	36	15	+21	22	Tier D
98	P	Canada	10	6	1	3	53	14	+39	19	Tier D
99	M	Dominican Republic	10	4	3	3	21	17	+4	15	Tier D
100	T	Somalia	10	4	0	6	20	24	−4	12	Tier D
101	D	DR Congo	10	6	0	4	24	19	+5	18	Tier D
102	Q	Lithuania	10	5	0	5	42	27	+15	15	Tier D
103	A	Kosovo	10	6	1	3	22	12	+10	19	Tier D
104	G	Burundi	10	4	0	6	14	31	−17	12	Tier D
105	AE	Sierra Leone	10	6	1	3	20	13	+7	19	Tier D
106	B	Oman	10	5	1	4	25	17	+8	16	Tier D
107	C	Zimbabwe	10	4	1	5	21	27	−6	13	Tier D
108	U	Cape Verde	10	4	1	5	23	18	+5	13	Tier D
109	AF	Andorra	10	4	1	5	13	20	−7	13	Tier D
110	F	Philippines	10	4	0	6	20	21	−1	12	Tier D
111	N	Aruba	10	3	3	4	26	31	−5	12	Tier D
112	J	Saudi Arabia	10	3	0	7	14	22	−8	9	Tier D
113	Z	North Macedonia	10	6	1	3	26	17	+9	19	Tier D
114	X	Tanzania	10	5	1	4	25	17	+8	16	Tier D
115	H	Syria	10	5	0	5	18	19	−1	15	Tier D
116	I	Lesotho	9	2	1	6	13	22	−9	7	Tier D
117	AC	Bermuda	10	5	0	5	24	22	+2	15	Tier D
118	AD	Jordan	10	2	3	5	13	19	−6	9	Tier D
119	R	Mauritius	10	2	2	6	15	20	−5	8	Tier D
120	K	Bahrain	10	2	1	7	13	25	−12	7	Tier D
121	L	Turkmenistan	10	4	1	5	13	25	−12	13	Tier D
122	Y	Mauritania	10	3	3	4	16	24	−8	12	Tier D
123	O	Botswana	10	4	0	6	21	32	−11	12	Tier D
124	V	Tahiti	9	2	1	6	14	39	−25	7	Tier D
125	W	Myanmar	10	4	2	4	17	23	−6	14	Tier D
126	AA	Burkina Faso	9	2	0	7	11	23	−12	6	Tier D
127	AB	Togo	10	3	1	6	24	20	+4	10	Tier D
128	S	Macau	10	2	0	8	8	38	−30	6	Tier D
129	J	Central African Republic	10	5	1	4	29	19	+10	16	Tier E
130	G	Bangladesh	10	3	4	3	13	13	0	13	Tier E
131	Z	Chad	10	4	3	3	20	13	+7	15	Tier E
132	I	Gabon	9	2	1	6	12	25	−13	7	Tier E
133	C	Montenegro	10	4	2	4	17	21	−4	14	Tier E
134	N	Palestine	10	3	2	5	19	22	−3	11	Tier E
135	E	Kuwait	10	4	1	5	11	17	−6	13	Tier E
136	T	Puerto Rico	10	3	1	6	24	28	−4	10	Tier E
137	AF	Israel	10	3	3	4	12	20	−8	12	Tier E
138	L	Hong Kong	10	4	4	2	29	17	+12	16	Tier E
139	AD	Gambia	10	4	4	2	30	17	+13	16	Tier E
140	AE	Sudan	10	1	3	6	10	42	−32	6	Tier E
141	P	Singapore	10	4	1	5	34	28	+6	13	Tier E
142	M	Eswatini	10	3	0	7	15	29	−14	9	Tier E
143	U	Equatorial Guinea	10	2	1	7	8	30	−22	7	Tier E
144	Q	Saint Vincent and the Grenadines	10	2	1	7	19	40	−21	7	Tier E
145	D	Guinea-Bissau	10	5	0	5	22	22	0	15	Tier E
146	B	Chinese Taipei	10	3	1	6	17	26	−9	10	Tier E
147	V	Seychelles	9	3	2	4	18	21	−3	11	Tier E
148	W	Guam	10	2	1	7	9	29	−20	7	Tier E
149	R	Guyana	10	4	2	4	22	21	+1	14	Tier E
150	S	Saint Kitts and Nevis	10	1	3	6	14	30	−16	6	Tier E
151	O	Mongolia	10	2	3	5	20	25	−5	9	Tier E
152	F	Belize	10	2	3	5	14	30	−16	9	Tier E
153	K	Laos	10	4	1	5	31	32	−1	13	Tier E
154	AA	Antigua and Barbuda	9	2	1	6	14	41	−27	7	Tier E
155	X	Comoros	10	2	3	5	17	20	−3	9	Tier E
156	H	Dominica	10	3	1	6	21	29	−8	10	Tier E
157	Y	Turks and Caicos Islands	10	3	1	6	18	36	−18	10	Tier E
158	AB	Sri Lanka	10	2	1	7	14	34	−20	7	Tier E
159	A	Maldives	10	1	1	8	9	40	−31	4	Tier E
160	AC	British Virgin Islands	10	1	0	9	4	48	−44	3	Tier E
161	T	New Zealand	9	4	1	4	16	19	−3	13	Tier F
162	H	Ethiopia	10	3	1	6	13	28	−15	10	Tier F
163	D	Nepal	10	4	2	4	14	20	−6	14	Tier F
164	K	Grenada	10	2	2	6	16	35	−19	8	Tier F
165	Z	Malta	10	4	1	5	21	15	+6	13	Tier F
166	M	Samoa	10	2	2	6	10	42	−32	8	Tier F
167	G	Fiji	9	2	0	7	14	39	−25	6	Tier F
168	Y	Vanuatu	10	1	2	7	9	38	−29	5	Tier F
169	AD	Pakistan	10	4	3	3	26	15	+11	15	Tier F
170	AE	Djibouti	10	2	1	7	19	50	−31	7	Tier F
171	L	Cook Islands	10	3	0	7	10	41	−31	9	Tier F
172	X	Montserrat	10	1	2	7	12	47	−35	5	Tier F
173	AF	Timor-Leste	10	3	0	7	13	37	−24	9	Tier F
174	AC	São Tomé and Príncipe	10	1	1	8	7	62	−55	4	Tier F
175	F	Curaçao	9	1	0	8	16	48	−32	3	Tier F
176	W	Bahamas	10	1	0	9	12	41	−29	3	Tier F
177	E	Barbados	10	4	1	5	23	37	−14	13	Tier F
178	B	Suriname	10	3	0	7	14	28	−14	9	Tier F
179	O	Papua New Guinea	9	2	0	7	15	63	−48	6	Tier F
180	J	Solomon Islands	10	2	0	8	20	41	−21	6	Tier F
181	N	Saint Lucia	9	2	0	7	18	29	−11	6	Tier F
182	Q	Bhutan	10	2	1	7	11	51	−40	7	Tier F
183	S	Cayman Islands	10	1	1	8	10	36	−26	4	Tier F
184	P	American Samoa	9	0	0	9	1	96	−95	0	Tier F
185	C	Cambodia	9	2	1	6	18	30	−12	7	Tier F
186	U	Tonga	9	1	0	8	6	52	−46	3	Tier F
187	R	Brunei	9	1	1	7	8	39	−31	4	Tier F
188	A	Anguilla	10	1	2	7	14	44	−30	5	Tier F
189	AB	U.S. Virgin Islands	8	0	0	8	2	48	−46	0	Tier F

Source: FIFA
(H) Hosts

== Controversies ==
The decision to award the tournament to Azerbaijan drew criticism from human rights groups, including Amnesty International and Human Rights Watch, which argue that the Azerbaijani government uses high-profile sporting events to distract attention from domestic problems.

The tournament was also impacted by the wider dispute between FIFA and UEFA, where UEFA and its member associations threatened a boycott of FIFA competitions if FIFA's plans for a new commercial entity, FIFA Forward Enterprise, were approved. After FIFA held talks with private investors about commercialising the U-15 tournament, UEFA lifted the threatened boycott in late August after FIFA promised not to repeat a sale of World Cup rights.
