= FIFA Forward Enterprise =

Proposed commercial subsidiary of FIFA

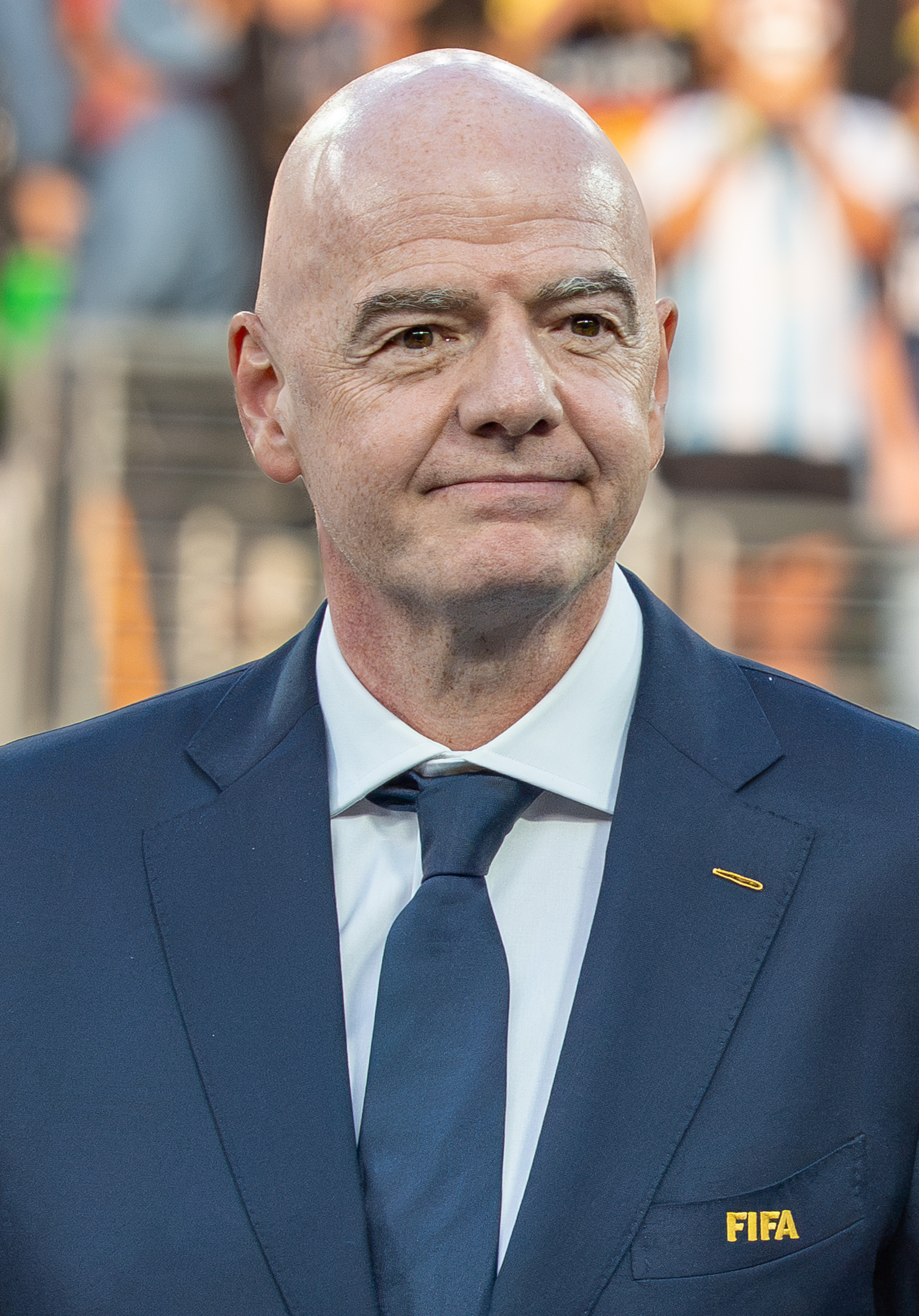
FIFA president Gianni Infantino during the 2026 FIFA World Cup final, days before the proposed FIFA Forward Enterprise investment plan announcement, which sparked criticism over transparency and governance

FIFA Forward Enterprise (FFE) was a proposed commercial subsidiary of FIFA, announced on 28 July 2026, to manage the commercial and operational rights of FIFA competitions, including the FIFA World Cup and the FIFA Club World Cup. Under the proposal, FIFA would retain majority control of the new entity while allowing private investors to acquire minority stakes, with the aim of increasing funding for football development through FIFA's member associations.

The proposal attracted significant international controversy due to its potential commercialization of FIFA's competitions, the involvement of private investment firms, and concerns raised by football confederations and leagues over governance, transparency, and consultation. Following heavy criticism, including opposition from the European football confederation UEFA including threats of a possible boycott, FIFA president Gianni Infantino withdrew the proposal, stating that the project had created divisions that were no longer in the interest of its original objective of strengthening football development and unity.

== Background ==
=== FIFA Forward Programme ===
The FIFA Forward Programme is FIFA's football development funding initiative. It was launched in 2016 to support member associations and confederations through investment in infrastructure, youth development, women's football, competitions, and governance.

- Forward 1.0 (2016–2018) established the programme by increasing financial support and introducing stronger oversight of development funds.
- Forward 2.0 (2019–2022) expanded funding and placed greater emphasis on sustainable projects, governance, and monitoring.
- Forward 3.0 (2023–2026) further increased investment in global football development while strengthening requirements for transparency, reporting, and long-term planning.

=== 2025 FIFA Club World Cup ===
FIFA expanded its competitions as part of its strategy to increase global participation and the international reach of its tournaments. The 2025 FIFA Club World Cup introduced a new 32-team format, replacing the previous seven-team tournament that had been held since 2005 with a larger competition featuring more clubs from all six confederations. The expanded format was expected to increase FIFA's commercial revenues, with a new global broadcast agreement with DAZN reportedly worth $1 billion including free worldwide streaming rights for the tournament. However, FIFPRO and other critics raised concerns over fixture congestion, player workload, and whether the expansion prioritized commercial interests over player welfare.

=== 2026 FIFA World Cup and controversies ===
The 2026 FIFA World Cup was also expanded from 32 to 48 teams, with FIFA citing greater global representation and increased opportunities for participating nations. The expansion helped FIFA's broader strategy to grow the scale and commercial value of its competitions, helping to increase revenue generated through broadcasting rights, sponsorships, licensing, and ticket sales.

The commercial success of the 2026 FIFA World Cup, which was hosted in Canada, Mexico, and the United States, contributed to FIFA's projected record revenue of more than $15 billion for the 2023–2026 financial cycle; however FIFA faced criticism over its ticketing policies, particularly its use of dynamic pricing, which caused prices to fluctuate with demand and led to record-high costs for many matches. The 2026 tournament also drew criticism over FIFA's increasing commercialization of the World Cup. The introduction of mandatory hydration breaks in every match, regardless of weather conditions, was a main focus of criticism by fans, players and coaches, who argued that the stoppages primarily created additional opportunities for television adverts. The final also featured the tournament's first halftime show, which prompted further debate over the adoption of entertainment elements associated with other major sporting events.

During the tournament, FIFA President Gianni Infantino said that FIFA would examine a potential expansion of the World Cup to 64 teams for the 2030 tournament. However, it was opposed by officials from UEFA and CONCACAF. The proposal was intended to increase global participation and further expand the scale and commercial potential of FIFA competitions, consistent with Infantino's broader focus on growing football's revenues.

=== The Times report ===
On 28 July 2026, The Times reported that FIFA planned to create a subsidiary that would manage the commercial and operational rights of its competitions, known as FIFA Forward Enterprise (FFE). The report also stated that Infantino could become the entity's commissioner after his FIFA presidency ends in 2031, with compensation potentially comparable to NFL commissioner Roger Goodell's reported annual salary of around $64 million. UEFA responded to the report, saying the proposal crossed "a line that football's governing institutions should never cross" and that football was "not FIFA's to sell." UEFA also called for transparency over the involvement of private investors.

== Proposal ==
FIFA announced the proposal to create FIFA Forward Enterprise on 28 July 2026. FIFA stated that it would be valued at $20 billion whilst remaining under FIFA control, with private investors allowed to acquire minority stakes. According to FIFA, the initiative could raise $4.2 billion and provide up to $40 million to each of its 211 member associations. Per FIFA, FFE was intended to create a dedicated commercial subsidiary to manage FIFA's commercial and event operations, including broadcasting, sponsorship, ticketing, and licensing rights. The initiative aimed to attract long-term investment and increase revenues to support global football development through FIFA Forward. With funds from FFE, FIFA Forward funding for member associations would increase from USD 8 million to USD 20 million for the 2027–2030 cycle, supporting infrastructure, coaching, national teams, competitions, grassroots football, and women's football. FIFA would set a 19 September deadline for associations to accept the offer, with those accepting set to receive an optional upfront payment.

FIFA later circulated a 25-page "FIFA Forward Enterprise Member Materials" presentation, prepared with JPMorgan, to its 211 member associations, outlining the proposed creation of FIFA Forward Enterprise. The document projected that FIFA Forward payments could rise to $24 million per member association by the 2035–2039 cycle, which would be financed through expanded tournaments, external capital, debt financing, and higher-value commercial partnerships.

== Responses and reactions ==
The initiative generated significant controversy across the football community, with stakeholders expressing concerns over its potential impact on the governance, structure, and future direction of the sport. Discussions focused on issues including transparency, decision-making processes, and the increasing role of commercial interests in football. The proposal was compared by some observers to the backlash surrounding the initial European Super League plan in 2021, particularly due to concerns over governance, commercialization, and the role of private interests in football.

Further scrutiny focused on the involvement of Joshua Kushner's investment firm, Thrive Eternal, which was reported to be leading the proposed investor group for FFE. The group was expected to acquire around 20% of the entity through a minority, non-controlling stake. The proposed entity was developed with support from financial advisers, including JPMorgan, and commercial adviser Greg Maffei, as FIFA explored ways to attract long-term investment while retaining control over football governance and competitions.

=== Confederations and organizations ===
The proposal faced criticism from UEFA, CONCACAF, the AFC, European Leagues, European Football Clubs (EFC), the World Leagues Association (WLA), and FIFPRO Europe, which raised concerns over transparency, stakeholder consultation, player welfare, football governance, and the involvement of private investors in football assets.

Sheikh Salman bin Ibrahim Al Khalifa, president of the AFC, criticized FIFA's lack of consultation over the proposal, calling it "totally unacceptable" and warning that it undermined the foundations of continental football. He added that "such an initiative will not succeed without the support of all the confederations", noting that this support did not currently exist. The Confederation of African Football (CAF) confirmed that it had received FIFA's proposal and that CAF President Patrice Motsepe would convene the CAF Executive Committee to assess and evaluate the initiative as part of the consultation process with FIFA Member Associations and the FIFA Council.

The Oceania Football Confederation (OFC) acknowledged FIFA's consultation process regarding the proposed FIFA Forward Enterprise initiative, stating that the proposal would be reviewed by its Executive Committee and inviting its member associations to participate in discussions. CONMEBOL expressed caution over FIFA's proposed FIFA Forward Enterprise (FFE) project, stating that commercial and financial decisions must serve football rather than override its sporting values. The confederation said it requested further information from FIFA regarding the project's scope, structure, governance and potential effects, while calling for unity and emphasizing that football should remain the priority.

=== Federations ===
The Czech Football Association (FAČR) president David Trunda said the plan could bring financial benefits for grassroots football and infrastructure. The Czech League Football Association (LFA) rejected the unclear stance of David Trunda and expressed full support for UEFA and president Aleksander Čeferin's opposition to FIFA's proposals, including the creation of a commercial division and changes to FIFA competitions. Trunda later stated that his comments to British media had been misinterpreted, saying that he had only called for further details before making a final decision. He clarified that his remarks were not an endorsement of the proposal. The FAČR later issued a statement rejecting FIFA's proposal to create FIFA Forward Enterprise and confirmed its support for UEFA's opposition to the plan.

German Football Association (DFB) president Bernd Neuendorf opposed the proposal, calling it "a fatal signal" to open the FIFA World Cup to private investors and criticising FIFA for failing to consult its Council before announcing the plans. German club VfB Stuttgart opposed the proposal, with chief executive Alexander Wehrle backing UEFA and the DFB and criticising FIFA's lack of consultation and the further commercialisation of football.

The Football Association (FA) said it was unaware of the proposal before its public announcement and expressed concern over the lack of process, governance, and available information. FA chairwoman Debbie Hewitt and chief executive Mark Bullingham later voiced opposition during UEFA's meeting on the proposal. Despite Hewitt being one of FIFA's eight vice-presidents, she said she had no knowledge of the discussions Infantino had held regarding the plans before their announcement. French Football Federation (FFF) president Philippe Diallo criticised FIFA's proposal as "worrying" and a "cause for concern," saying European football bodies were not consulted before the plans were announced.

The United States Soccer Federation and Canada Soccer expressed support for CONCACAF's collective decision to reject the FIFA Forward Enterprise proposal, with US Soccer stating that it "stands with Concacaf and its members" and Canada Soccer similarly saying it "stands with Concacaf and its members on today's collective decision." The Mexican Football Federation said it would study the proposal before taking a final position, seeking further information from FIFA on the new financial model.

Football Australia did not immediately support or reject the proposal, instead requesting further information from FIFA to assess its strategic, commercial, and governance implications. The association said it would form a position after further consultation with FIFA and the Asian Football Confederation. Football Association of Indonesia president Erick Thohir backed the proposal, arguing that the creation of FFE could provide additional funding for football development in Indonesia and stating that, if approved by FIFA member associations, the proposal would demonstrate demand for such a commercial model.

Comoros Football Federation president Said Ali Said Athouman highlighted the financial struggles of smaller football associations, saying that $20 million would be a transformative amount for the Comoros. He stressed the need for more funding while urging FIFA to preserve its values and avoid becoming purely profit-driven. New Zealand Football rejected the proposal, stating that it lacked the independent governance, legal, and financial assessments needed for a proper evaluation. The organisation said it had "questions and concerns" about both the proposal and the process behind its development, and confirmed that it could not support the plan.

=== Clubs ===
Solomon Islands club Real Kakamora became the first side in Oceania to advocate against the proposal on 30 July in a statement that strongly urged the SIFF and other OFC member nations to "join UEFA in unequivocally rejecting FIFA's proposal", suggesting that the plan was "in direct opposition to the values and ideals that have made world football what it is today."

=== Political ===
The proposal also drew criticism from political figures. UK prime minister Andy Burnham said that the World Cup was "not a product" and warned that selling a stake in the competition would mean "selling out" the tournament. He later called for Infantino to resign over the plan. The French government also called for emergency talks among European football authorities, with Sports Minister Marina Ferrari warning that the plan represented a major shift in football governance and stating that "football is not for sale."

The controversy drew scrutiny in the United States. On 27 July 2026, US House Judiciary Committee Democrats announced an investigation into alleged corruption concerns involving FIFA, including its governance, ticketing practices, and relationship with the Trump administration. Following FIFA's announcement of the FFE proposal, Ranking Member Jamie Raskin renewed criticism of the organisation, accusing it of pursuing a multibillion-dollar commercial sell-off and warning that FIFA could face further congressional scrutiny over its financial and political ties.

EU Commissioner for Sport Glenn Micallef criticised FIFA's plan to sell a stake in FIFA Forward Enterprise, warning that the increasing commercialisation of football and potential links between FIFA's regulatory role and private financial interests raised concerns for European football governance. On 31 July 2026, US president Donald Trump said that he had not discussed FIFA's investor proposal with Infantino when asked about the plan during a Cabinet meeting at Camp David.

=== FIFA current and former officials ===
Infantino defended the plan, calling it "an opportunity but not an obligation" and saying it could unlock new commercial value to benefit FIFA's 211 member associations and football development worldwide. Former FIFA President Sepp Blatter also criticized the proposal, claiming that the relationship between Infantino and US President Donald Trump had reached a "financial dimension" that was damaging to football and arguing that nobody had the right to sell the sport. One of the investing companies was launched by Joshua Kushner, brother of Jared Kushner, Trump's son-in-law.

Following the criticism, FIFA clarified that the FFE proposal would not involve the sale of football or any transfer of control over the sport. The organization stated that FFE would operate as a subsidiary entity owned and permanently controlled by FIFA, with the commercial value generated shared among all 211 member associations. FIFA said the purpose of the proposal was to allow member associations to benefit more directly from football's commercial opportunities while preserving FIFA's governance structure. The governing body also stressed that the initiative remained part of a democratic consultation process and could be approved, rejected or amended by member associations, adding that without majority support from its members, FIFA's commercial activities would remain unchanged and FFE would not be created.

On 31 July 2026, senior adviser Carlos Cordeiro resigned in opposition to the proposal, describing it as "a bad deal for football" and urging other FIFA officials to speak out against it. On the same day, FIFA chief operating officer Kevin Lamour publicly criticized the plan, stating that staff had been "deceived" by the manner in which it had been developed and arguing that the proposal should not proceed. FIFA Secretary General Mattias Grafström was reported to have become increasingly separated from Infantino amid the crisis, fueling speculation over FIFA's leadership future. CONCACAF President Victor Montagliani had reportedly emerged as a potential challenger to Infantino in the next FIFA presidential election following opposition to the proposal.

=== Boycotts and rejections ===
On 30 July 2026, the 55 UEFA associations unanimously voted to boycott future World Cups (including the 2027 FIFA Women's World Cup and the 2030 FIFA World Cup) and all FIFA competitions until FIFA Forward Enterprise "has been abandoned in its entirety and binding assurances have been given that FIFA will never again open its governance or competitions to private ownership". Later that day, CONCACAF and its 41 Member Associations rejected the proposal, citing concerns over the lack of due process, transparency, governance, and the involvement of private investors in FIFA assets.

The AFC released a statement standing in solidarity with UEFA and CONCACAF, stating that the proposal "cannot realistically achieve the necessary broad consensus and unity required to move forward." However, the AFC stopped short of calling for a boycott of FIFA competitions, instead urging institutional reform and greater participation in FIFA's decision-making process. Michel Platini, who filed a criminal complaint against Infantino alleging that Infantino orchestrated a campaign of false accusations to prevent him from becoming FIFA president, following his acquittal of related charges by the courts, has personally congratulated UEFA President Aleksander Čeferin after the boycott threat. The controversy also raised questions over Infantino's future as FIFA president, with federations reportedly expressing doubts about his leadership during meetings over the proposal.

== Withdrawal of the proposal ==
On 31 July 2026, Infantino announced the proposal would not proceed any further. FIFA said the project was intended to strengthen member associations and support football development worldwide, but emphasized that its priority remained unity and improving the game. Infantino added that FIFA would seek to bring stakeholders together and continue supporting football development, particularly in areas most in need.

== Aftermath ==
Following FIFA's withdrawal of the proposal, the Mexican Football Federation stated that the review of the initiative was considered closed. The federation welcomed the decision, saying it prioritized unity among football's confederations and member associations. The Asian Football Confederation (AFC) also welcomed FIFA's withdrawal of the FIFA Forward Enterprise proposal, with President Sheikh Salman bin Ibrahim Al Khalifa stating that initiatives affecting global football should be discussed with confederations, the FIFA Council, member associations and other stakeholders in a transparent manner.

CONCACAF and its 41 member associations welcomed FIFA's withdrawal of the FIFA Forward Enterprise proposal, calling for greater accountability and transparency in FIFA's governance. The confederation also said it would work through the FIFA Council to strengthen governance and expand football development funding through the existing FIFA Forward programme. The Confederation of African Football (CAF) endorsed FIFA's withdrawal of the FIFA Forward Enterprise proposal and reaffirmed its support for Infantino, while emphasizing the importance of governance, transparency and due process. CONMEBOL welcomed FIFA's withdrawal of the FIFA Forward Enterprise proposal, expressing concern over unilateral actions and calling for greater dialogue, transparency, and respect for institutional governance procedures in football.

=== Support for Infantino ===
The Qatar Football Association (QFA) welcomed FIFA's withdrawal of the FIFA Forward Enterprise proposal, saying it prioritized unity among FIFA's member associations. The QFA also reaffirmed its support for Infantino and his efforts to develop the game globally. The United Arab Emirates Football Association (UAEFA) also welcomed the withdrawal, describing it as a decision that protected the unity of world football while calling for greater consultation on future commercial proposals, and reaffirmed its support for Infantino's leadership.

The Royal Moroccan Football Federation (FRMF) President Fouzi Lekjaa welcomed FIFA's withdrawal of the proposed FIFA Forward Enterprise project, saying the decision preserved the unity of world football. He reaffirmed Morocco's support for FIFA's development programmes and the interests of member associations. The Djiboutian Football Federation (FDF), led by Souleiman Hassan Waberi, welcomed FIFA's withdrawal of the FIFA Forward Enterprise proposal and reaffirmed its support for Infantino and the FIFA Forward programme.

The Egyptian Football Association (EFA) welcomed FIFA's decision to withdraw the proposal, describing it as an example of "true leadership" and saying it demonstrated FIFA's commitment to dialogue, consultation and the unity of world football. The EFA also reaffirmed its full confidence in Infantino's leadership. Moreover, Kuwait, Sri Lanka and Lebanon were reported to have expressed support for Infantino. Reuters further noted that smaller nations such as Bhutan and Vanuatu could be important allies, given their reliance on FIFA development funding and their positive relationship with Infantino's administration. Indonesia, the Philippines, Mauritania, Niger and the Democratic Republic of the Congo were also reported to have expressed support for Infantino.

The Argentine Football Association (AFA) backed Infantino's leadership, praising his decade in charge of FIFA and supporting the decision to withdraw the FIFA Forward Enterprise proposal while calling for continued work under his leadership. The Mexican Football Federation (FMF) also supported Infantino's leadership amid the FIFA Forward Enterprise controversy, emphasizing the importance of institutional processes and governance within FIFA. Mexico was the only 2026 World Cup host to publicly support Infantino.

Other African football associations reported as supportive include Nigeria, Comoros, Malawi, Uganda and Gambia, alongside the Paraguay and Mongolia, which also voiced support for Infantino. The South African Minister of Sports, Arts and Culture, Gayton McKenzie, also defended Infantino, saying he had been "very good to African football" and urging African countries to be cautious about joining calls for his removal. On 13 August, the football associations of Morocco, Qatar, Egypt, Mauritania, Lebanon and Sudan issued a joint statement expressing "full support" for Infantino and confidence in his leadership. On 24 August, Cameroonian Football Federation president Samuel Eto'o defended Infantino, saying he had done nothing wrong, urging African nations to support him and arguing that the proposed FIFA Forward Enterprise plan could have significantly benefited smaller African federations. The Saudi Arabian Football Federation also backed Infantino, welcoming FIFA's apology and the scrapping of the proposal while calling for dialogue to restore unity.

=== Opposition to Infantino's leadership ===
UEFA welcomed FIFA's withdrawal of the FIFA Forward Enterprise proposal, stating that it would work with its member associations and other confederations to review how the proposal had arisen, improve the existing FIFA Forward programme, and prevent similar initiatives in the future. UEFA also said the episode had undermined its confidence in FIFA's leadership and called for greater transparency in FIFA's governance. The Royal Dutch Football Association (KNVB) welcomed FIFA's withdrawal of the FIFA Forward Enterprise proposal but said the process had resulted in a loss of confidence in Infantino's leadership and called for greater transparency in FIFA's governance. DFB President Bernd Neuendorf called for the events surrounding the project to be fully clarified and criticized FIFA's decision-making process under Infantino, accusing the president of acting unilaterally and without transparency. The Ukrainian Association of Football (UAF) backed UEFA's opposition to the FIFA Forward Enterprise proposal, criticizing the lack of transparency surrounding the project.

LALIGA President Javier Tebas criticised Infantino and called for a change in FIFA leadership, arguing that the withdrawal of the FIFA Forward Enterprise project does not resolve the organization's deeper governance issues and that world football needs "new leadership" to restore credibility, improve transparency and ensure greater consultation with stakeholders. La Liga club Real Madrid welcomed FIFA's decision to abandon the proposal for the partial sale of commercial rights to its competitions, saying it protected football's interests and the role of clubs. The club also praised UEFA and other football bodies for opposing the plan, arguing that international competitions should remain a shared sporting heritage rather than be treated as financial assets.

UEFA vice-president Laura McAllister and Norwegian Football Federation President Lise Klaveness were among the leading figures behind UEFA's opposition to the proposed FIFA Forward Enterprise investment plan. McAllister advocated a boycott of FIFA competitions if the proposal proceeded, while Klaveness outlined governance options should FIFA's leadership face a wider challenge. Following FIFA's withdrawal of the proposal, both publicly criticized the process as "economic blackmail".

UEFA President Aleksander Čeferin was considering discussing a possible boycott of the 2029 FIFA Club World Cup with Nasser Al-Khelaifi, president of the European Football Clubs (EFC), as pressure mounted on FIFA President Gianni Infantino following the collapse of the FIFA Forward Enterprise proposal. Brazilian Football Confederation (CBF) also opposed the FIFA Forward Enterprise proposal, with president Samir Xaud becoming the first South American football leader to publicly reject the project, saying he was personally against the proposed sale of rights. Former Sierra Leone Football Association president and former FIFA Council member Isha Johansen also criticized the FIFA Forward Enterprise proposal, showing that support for Infantino is not unanimous across Africa.

=== Statements and developments within FIFA ===
FIFA Secretary-General Mattias Grafström described the abandoned FIFA Forward Enterprise plan as a "sad and reproachable" episode, telling staff that "individuals, unstable moments and unfortunate episodes come and go" while the institution's mission would continue. FIFA chief of global football development Arsène Wenger backed the withdrawal of the FIFA Forward Enterprise proposal, describing the decision as "absolutely necessary and beyond question" and stating that he believed in an independent FIFA serving football with "commitment, transparency, and integrity".

On 17 August, FIFA sacked chief operating officer Kevin Lamour, less than three weeks after he publicly criticized the abandoned FIFA Forward Enterprise plan. On 19 August, FIFA vice-president Sándor Csányi announced his withdrawal of support for Infantino, citing Lamour's dismissal as "final straw".

== Subsequent reports ==
=== Preparation of the proposal ===
The Athletic revealed details of Infantino's proposed investment deal with Joshua Kushner's firm before FIFA could officially announce it. The reveal had been intended for the eve of the 2026 World Cup final at the Waldorf Astoria in New York, but was delayed following a decision by Infantino. However, he had already discussed the proposal with wealthy contacts around the final, which sources suggested contributed to the plan leaking to the press. According to the Financial Times, the plan had been developed over nearly a year following discussions between Kushner, Greg Maffei and Infantino at the Allen & Company Sun Valley Conference, with the final terms sheet signed only weeks before the planned announcement.

The Athletic later reported that FIFA's five-member bureau of the management board was summoned to a hastily arranged meeting at the Waldorf Astoria, where members were asked to approve the proposed transaction. They were reportedly given until midnight that evening to make a decision, despite several members having not previously been informed about the deal. The members were also reportedly concerned that delaying or rejecting the proposal could anger Infantino, who was not present at the meeting but was understood to support the transaction. The Times alleged that Infantino had considered a senior role in the proposed FIFA Forward Enterprise, with whistleblowers claiming that the position could have included a salary of around $30 million plus bonuses.

=== Post-announcement events and repercussions ===
According to L'Équipe, French president Emmanuel Macron had intervened against the proposal, speaking by telephone with Infantino on 30 July 2026 and urging "unity in world football" while warning against divisions over the plan. The Telegraph reported that UEFA threatened legal action against Gianni Infantino, Joshua Kushner and others involved in the abandoned FIFA Forward Enterprise plan, demanding the preservation of related documents while considering legal action and regulatory complaints. Joshua Kushner later expressed regret over Thrive Capital's involvement, saying it had "failed to appreciate the political dynamics of global football" and that, had it known the backlash, "we would not have gotten involved".

Reuters reported that, according to the New York Post, Infantino had sought support from US President Donald Trump following the collapse of the FIFA Forward Enterprise proposal. The report said Infantino had unsuccessfully attempted to contact Trump by phone and had scheduled talks with US Secretary of State Marco Rubio, although the US State Department denied that any call with Rubio was planned. FIFA denied the New York Post report that Gianni Infantino sought help from the Trump administration, stating that no calls were scheduled with Marco Rubio or other Cabinet officials.

Sky News reported that FIFA had circulated pre-written endorsement letters to some football associations seeking support for Infantino's re-election, with the letters praising his leadership and allegedly prepared by FIFA staff ahead of next year's election. Infantino reportedly offered Morocco the 2030 FIFA World Cup final in exchange for reelection support. Later that day, FIFA denied the report, calling it "false and misleading" and stating that the host of the 2030 World Cup final would be decided "in due course". The Royal Spanish Football Federation said it was unaware of any such offer, while the Moroccan Football Federation also denied the claim.

=== U-15 World Cup and festival commercialisation plan ===
On 20 August, The Athletic reported that talks were held for the FIFA U-15 World Cup & Festival to be commercialised, with FIFA allowing private investors to pitch proposals. One notable proposal came from Juan Carlos Rodríguez Bas, the former commissioner of the Mexican Football Federation, with backing from Eldridge Industries, a holding company chaired by Chelsea F.C. controlling co-owner and chairman Todd Boehly. The proposal would have seen the tournament held at the ESPN Wide World of Sports Complex at Walt Disney World Resort near Orlando, Florida, with discussions held with ESPN about not only the host proposal but also broadcasting rights in the United States. The tournament was also initially not going to accept any broadcasting rights fees, opting for it to be primarily shown on high-visibility platforms. The plans were scrapped just prior to the 2026 World Cup, with the Bureau of the FIFA Council instead awarding the 2026 U-15 World Cup & Festival to Azerbaijan on 25 June without any private investment.

== Governance review calls ==
=== Member associations withdraw Infantino support ===
According to The Telegraph, UEFA reportedly called for Infantino to resign or face a no-confidence vote, citing a loss of trust in FIFA's leadership. The Football Association (FA) and CONCACAF also backed calls for a review of FIFA's governance and decision-making processes.

On 30 July 2026, the Football Association of Finland withdrew its support for Gianni Infantino's re-election as FIFA president after its board reassessed its previous endorsement, citing concerns over FIFA's governance, transparency, decision-making, and the proposed transfer of FIFA World Cup commercial rights to a new corporate structure. On 3 August, the Football Association of Wales (FAW) also withdrew its support for Infantino's re-election at the upcoming 77th FIFA Congress, citing failures in governance, leadership, and stakeholder management following the withdrawal of the FIFA Forward Enterprise proposal. Later the same day, the football associations of Serbia and Sweden announced they were withdrawing their support for Infantino's candidacy, citing concerns over governance, transparency and leadership. The Hellenic Football Federation informed FIFA that it would no longer support Gianni Infantino’s bid for a fourth term. The Football Association (FA) was also reported to be preparing to withdraw its previous support for Infantino's re-election campaign.

On 4 August, The Guardian reported that several member associations of CONCACAF were considering withdrawing their endorsements of Infantino following an emergency meeting, while New Zealand Football said it would consult with fellow Oceania members before deciding its position on Infantino's leadership. On 5 August, European Leagues called for governance reform at FIFA, criticizing its decision-making and lack of stakeholder consultation, and reiterated its opposition to the expansion or creation of FIFA competitions until reforms were implemented. On the same day, UEFA football advisor and former Portugal international Luís Figo called for Infantino to resign, writing in an opinion article: "I could write 10,000 words on the problems at FIFA. But the solution needs only three: 'Infantino must go.'"

On 7 August, the Norwegian Football Federation called for Infantino to resign, with president Lise Klaveness saying the federation had lost trust in him and saw "no way back." The opposition had also expanded beyond the associations that had formally withdrawn their support. Croatia, Albania and Romania had either withdrawn, suspended, or indicated that they no longer had confidence in Infantino's leadership. The Football Association of Ireland (FAI) withdrew its support for Infantino, citing concerns over governance, transparency and a lack of consultation. On 14 August, New Zealand Football withdrew its support for Infantino's re-election, citing concerns over FIFA's governance and calling for an independent review of the FIFA Forward Enterprise scheme. On 17 August, the Scottish FA also withdrew its support, with chief executive Ian Maxwell saying Scotland had "lost confidence in the FIFA leadership" and would not vote for Infantino in 2027. On 23 August, the six Nordic football associations declared that they had lost confidence in Infantino's leadership and supported calls for his resignation. On 24 August, the Gibraltar Football Association (GFA) also withdrew its support for Infantino's re-election bid, without endorsing an alternative candidate. Two days later, the Italian Football Federation (FIGC) officially announced that it was withdrawing its support for Infantino's bid for re-election as FIFA president. On 30 August, the Royal Dutch Football Association (KNVB) withdrew its confidence in Infantino's leadership, calling for new FIFA leadership from 2027 onwards and broader reforms to FIFA's governance, transparency, oversight and decision-making processes.

=== Political positions on Infantino's leadership ===
British Prime Minister Andy Burnham became the first leader of a major country to call for Infantino's resignation, saying: "My view is strengthening – this was an outrageous suggestion. The idea that it could even be brought forward, in my view, shows that the FIFA [president] is the wrong man to lead the organisation." Former International Olympic Committee (IOC) marketing director Michael Payne described Infantino's leadership as "radioactive", said the FIFA Forward Enterprise proposal reflected "gross hubris", and argued that the controversy had left him struggling to retain his presidency.

Canadian Prime Minister Mark Carney said he had "no confidence" in Infantino's leadership of FIFA, describing the withdrawn FIFA Forward Enterprise proposal as "fatal" and adding to growing criticism of Infantino's presidency. German Minister of State for Culture Wolfram Weimer called for Infantino's resignation, saying he had "seriously damaged world football" with his plans to sell World Cup rights to private investors and had lost the trust of the European football community. In contrast, US President Donald Trump defended Infantino, calling his proposed removal a "terrible mistake" and praising his leadership of the 2026 World Cup.

=== FIFA crisis meeting and UEFA's continued boycott threat ===
Infantino held a crisis meeting with senior FIFA officials in Morocco as he sought to shore up his position following the collapse of his proposal. After the meeting, FIFA said its leadership had reaffirmed its support for Infantino, agreed that its internal processes and communications should be improved, acknowledged mistakes in the handling of the withdrawn FIFA Forward Enterprise proposal. It also announced an internal review to be presented to the FIFA Council, and stated that it would "no longer tolerate any attacks on its integrity" while working to restore confidence in the organization.

UEFA maintained its threat to boycott FIFA competitions, stating that FIFA's response "changed nothing" and that its conditions for withdrawing the boycott threat had not been met, including assurances that similar proposals would not be attempted again. FIFPRO also criticized FIFA's response, arguing that the withdrawal of the FIFA Forward Enterprise proposal did not resolve the governance concerns it had exposed. The players' union called for structural reforms, including greater stakeholder involvement in FIFA decision-making, voting rights for professional football representatives on the FIFA Council, and safeguards against unilateral decisions by FIFA leadership. The Football Association (FA) formally withdrew its support for Infantino's re-election campaign on 6 August, confirming that an apology from Infantino and FIFA's reaffirmation of support for his leadership had not changed its position.

On 10 August, UEFA, AFC and CONCACAF shared an open letter criticizing FIFA's handling of the affair and calling for an independent review and greater accountability. They argued that the Morocco meeting reinforced concerns over FIFA's governance and called for leadership that serves the football community rather than concentrates power. On 27 August, UEFA said FIFA had confirmed in writing that FIFA Forward Enterprise had been "irrevocably and permanently withdrawn" and would not return in any form. UEFA therefore provisionally suspended its threatened withdrawal from FIFA competitions for the 2026–27 season, while calling for an independent external review of FFE and warning that the wider governance crisis remained unresolved.

=== UEFA's campaign against Infantino ===
After ending its boycott threat, UEFA shifted towards legal action against Gianni Infantino. UEFA asked a U.S. federal court in Florida for documents and testimony from FIFA's Florida-based entities, intending to use the evidence in potential criminal proceedings against Infantino in Switzerland over the FFE proposal.

== See also ==
- European Super League, another proposed football initiative supported by private investment.
