= FIFA U-15 World Cup & Festival =

International youth football competition

- Organiser(s): FIFA
- Founded: 2026; 0 years ago
- Region: International
- Teams: 189 (2026)
- Related competitions: FIFA U-17 World Cup; FIFA U-17 Women's World Cup; FIFA U-20 World Cup; FIFA U-20 Women's World Cup
- Website: fifa.com
- 2026 FIFA U-15 World Cup & Festival

The FIFA U-15 World Cup & Festival is an international youth football competition organised by FIFA for national teams of players up to the age of 15. The competition was created as part of FIFA's stated commitment to promote youth football, with the U-15 tournament for boys and girls approved by the FIFA Council in December 2025.

Azerbaijan was appointed as host of the inaugural edition, which is scheduled to take place from 22 to 31 October 2026. However, prior proposals were made for the tournament to be commercialised, with one wanting the tournament to be staged in the United States. According to FIFA, the decision to choose Azerbaijan reflected an assessment of the country's sporting and general infrastructure, including its capacity to host thousands of young players and accompanying staff in a centralised location. The selection was also described by FIFA as providing "a sense of strategic continuity", given that Azerbaijan had previously been appointed as a co-host of the 2027 FIFA U-20 World Cup along with Uzbekistan.

== Format and concept ==
The competition is intended as a development-oriented event rather than a conventional knockout-style World Cup, reflecting FIFA's objective of increasing participation in youth football. The tournament is accompanied by a football festival involving all participating teams, with FIFA describing the event as an opportunity to promote learning, cultural exchange and grassroots development alongside competition.

Matches are played in an eight-a-side format on reduced-size pitches with smaller goals. Each match consists of two 20-minute halves, with rolling substitutions permitted throughout the game. The use of smaller teams and playing areas is intended to maximise player's involvement, increased touches and decision-making opportunities.

=== Festival ===
Alongside the tournament, FIFA stages a football festival involving all participating delegations. FIFA has described the festival as a central component of the event, intended to emphasise friendship, inclusion and learning, in addition to sporting competition. The format aims to provide young players from all member associations with international experience at an early stage, encouraging participation, fair play and technical improvement.

== Editions and gender format ==
The competition alternates in format across its first three editions, before settling into a regular pattern from 2028 onwards:

- The first edition, in 2026, is open to boys' national teams from all FIFA member associations.
- The second edition, in 2027, will be reserved for girls' national teams only.
- From 2028 onwards, FIFA intends to stage separate boys' and girls' competitions, with all member associations invited to enter teams in both.

== Results ==
=== Boys ===
Ed.	Year	Host	Final			Third place playoff			No. of teams
Ed.	Year	Host	Champion	Score	Runner-up	Third place	Score	Fourth place	No. of teams
1	2026	Azerbaijan	Spain	3–0	Czech Republic	Greece	6–2	Paraguay	189
2	2028	TBC							

=== Girls ===
Ed.	Year	Host	Final			Third place playoff			No. of teams
Ed.	Year	Host	Champion	Score	Runner-up	Third place	Score	Fourth place	No. of teams
1	2027	TBC							
2	2028	TBC							

== Reactions and context ==
The launch of the competition attracted attention for potential implications of Russian youth football, since the eligibility criteria referred only to FIFA member associations in good standing, rather than excluding specific countries; the Russian Football Union has remained a FIFA member despite the suspension of Russia from international sport. FIFA president Gianni Infantino has previously argued that children should not be penalised for political decisions and has called for greater participation of young players from suspended nations in international tournaments. Human rights organisations, including Amnesty International and Human Rights Watch, have said that Azerbaijan's government uses high-profile sporting events as a means of diverting attention from domestic human rights concerns, a criticism that has previously been raised in connection with other major tournaments staged in the country.

On 20 August 2026, it would be revealed in an article in The Athletic that FIFA talked to private investors about the possibility of commercialising the U-15 World Cup. One proposal, from the former commissioner of the Mexican Football Federation Juan Carlos Rodríguez Bas, with backing from the Todd Boehly-chaired Eldridge Industries, wanted the tournament to be held at the ESPN Wide World of Sports Complex at Walt Disney World Resort. Conversations were held with ESPN about the hosting proposal as well as the broadcasting. The commercialisation plans were discarded prior to the start of the 2026 FIFA World Cup in favour of hosting the tournament in Azerbaijan without private investment, as FIFA would go ahead with their FIFA Forward Enterprise proposal instead.
