= 2019 CONCACAF Boys' Under-15 Championship =

Tournament details
- Host country: United States
- City: Bradenton, Florida
- Dates: 4–11 August
- Teams: 41 (from 2 confederations)
- Venue: 1 (in 1 host city)

Final positions
- Champions: Portugal (1st title)
- Runners-up: Slovenia

Tournament statistics
- Top scorer(s): (Saint Vincent and the Grenadines) Oryan Velox (6 goals)
- Best player: (Portugal) Diogo Prioste
- Best goalkeeper: (Portugal) André Gomes
- Fair play award: Little Haiti FC Miami

The 2019 CONCACAF Boys' Under-15 Championship is an international football tournament, the third edition of the CONCACAF Boys' Under-15 Championship.

The competition was initially set to feature up to 39 teams from the CONCACAF region as well as three invited teams from UEFA; however, the withdrawal of Jamaica led to a total of 41 teams.

All times EDT (UTC−4).

== Teams ==
The 41 teams were divided in three divisions according to the Concacaf Men's Under-17 Ranking as of 2019.

Division 1 (16 teams)

- Mexico
- Israel (invited from UEFA)
- Panama
- Curaçao
- United States
- Haiti
- Guatemala
- Suriname
- Slovenia (invited from UEFA)
- Canada
- El Salvador
- Guadeloupe
- Portugal (invited from UEFA)
- Costa Rica
- Trinidad and Tobago
- Barbados

Division 2 (16 teams)

- Nicaragua
- Guyana
- Cayman Islands
- Bahamas
- Puerto Rico
- Martinique
- Grenada
- Dominican Republic
- Saint Lucia
- French Guiana
- Belize
- Saint Kitts and Nevis
- Bermuda
- Antigua and Barbuda
- Saint Vincent and the Grenadines
- Aruba

Division 3 (9 teams)

- Saint Martin
- Bonaire
- US Virgin Islands
- Anguilla
- British Virgin Islands
- Dominica
- Montserrat
- Turks and Caicos Islands
- Sint Maarten

== Venues ==
The competition took place at the IMG Academy in Bradenton, Florida, United States, the same venue as the previous edition.

== Format ==
Each match shall last 70 minutes, comprising two periods of 35 minutes with an interval of 10 minutes in between. In the championship game, if the score is tied at the end of regulation time, two 10 minute overtime periods will be played. If the score is still tied at the end of overtime, kicks from the penalty mark shall be taken to determine the winner.

In Division 1, the 16 teams are divided into four groups (A to D) of four. After the group stage, the top two teams of each group advance to the quarter-finals, where the winners advance to the semi-finals and final. The remaining teams play in a final round classification match depending on their position.

In Division 2, the 16 teams are also divided into four groups (E to H) of four. After the group stage, each team play in a final round classification match depending on their position.

In Division 3, the 9 teams are divided into two groups (I and J), one of four and one of five. After the group stage, each team play in a final round classification match depending on their position.

== Division 1 ==
=== Group stage ===
==== Group A ====
| Pos | Team | Pld | W | D | L | GF | GA | GD | Pts | Qualification |
|---|---|---|---|---|---|---|---|---|---|---|
| 1 | Mexico | 3 | 2 | 1 | 0 | 9 | 1 | +8 | 7 | Quarter-finals |
| 2 | Israel | 3 | 1 | 1 | 1 | 6 | 4 | +2 | 4 | Quarter-finals |
| 3 | Panama | 3 | 1 | 1 | 1 | 4 | 4 | 0 | 4 | Knockout round |
| 4 | Curaçao | 3 | 0 | 1 | 2 | 1 | 11 | −10 | 1 | Knockout round |

Source: CONCACAF
Rules for classification: Tiebreakers
4 August 2019
8:00

| Mexico | 3–0 | Panama |
|---|---|---|
| Cruz 28', 54'; González 61' | Report |

IMG Academy, Bradenton
Referee: Yusri Rudolf (Canada)
4 August 2019
10:00

| Israel | 5–0 | Curaçao |
|---|---|---|
| Sulimani 7', 29'; Huber 52'; Lin 63'; Abu Zeid 71' | Report |

IMG Academy, Bradenton
Referee: Natalie Simon (United States)

5 August 2019
8:00

| Curaçao | 1–1 | Panama |
|---|---|---|
| Márquez 47' | Report | Williams 22' |

IMG Academy, Bradenton
Referee: Filiberto Martínez (El Salvador)
5 August 2019
10:00

| Israel | 1–1 | Mexico |
|---|---|---|
| Ramot 73' | Report | Hernández 61' |

IMG Academy, Bradenton
Referee: Jamar Springer (Barbados)

7 August 2019
8:00

| Panama | 3–0 | Israel |
|---|---|---|
| Williams 13' (pen.), 33'; Gorday 50' | Report |

IMG Academy, Bradenton
Referee: Nima Saghafi (United States)
7 August 2019
10:00

| Curaçao | 0–5 | Mexico |
|---|---|---|
| | Report | Ávalos 10'; Conejo 34'; Cruz 41'; García 66'; Alcalá 67' |

IMG Academy, Bradenton
Referee: Ivan Zupan (Croatia)

==== Group B ====
| Pos | Team | Pld | W | D | L | GF | GA | GD | Pts | Qualification |
|---|---|---|---|---|---|---|---|---|---|---|
| 1 | United States (H) | 3 | 3 | 0 | 0 | 9 | 0 | +9 | 9 | Quarter-finals |
| 2 | Haiti | 3 | 1 | 1 | 1 | 2 | 3 | −1 | 4 | Quarter-finals |
| 3 | Guatemala | 3 | 1 | 1 | 1 | 2 | 4 | −2 | 4 | Knockout round |
| 4 | Suriname | 3 | 0 | 0 | 3 | 0 | 6 | −6 | 0 | Knockout round |

Source: CONCACAF
Rules for classification: Tiebreakers
(H) Hosts
4 August 2019
8:00

| United States | 2–0 | Haiti |
|---|---|---|
| Oliva 5'; Jauregui 61' | Report |

IMG Academy, Bradenton
Referee: Selvin Brown (Honduras)
4 August 2019
10:00

| Guatemala | 1–0 | Suriname |
|---|---|---|
| Estrada 33' | Report |

IMG Academy, Bradenton
Referee: José Raúl Eduarte (Costa Rica)

5 August 2019
8:00

| United States | 3–0 | Guatemala |
|---|---|---|
| Váldez 10'; Cisneros 16'; Jauregui 55' | Report |

IMG Academy, Bradenton
Referee: Cole Shoemaker (Canada)
5 August 2019
10:00

| Suriname | 0–1 | Haiti |
|---|---|---|
| | Report | Dambreville 47' |

IMG Academy, Bradenton
Referee: Pierre Luc Lauziere (Canada)

7 August 2019
8:00

| Suriname | 0–4 | United States |
|---|---|---|
| | Report | Váldez 3', 13' (pen.), 41'; Oliva 30' |

IMG Academy, Bradenton
Referee: Geiner Zúñiga (Costa Rica)
7 August 2019
10:00

| Haiti | 1–1 | Guatemala |
|---|---|---|
| Loute 71' | Report | Estrada 52' |

IMG Academy, Bradenton
Referee: Wayne Cartmel (England)

==== Group C ====
| Pos | Team | Pld | W | D | L | GF | GA | GD | Pts | Qualification |
|---|---|---|---|---|---|---|---|---|---|---|
| 1 | Slovenia | 3 | 3 | 0 | 0 | 9 | 0 | +9 | 9 | Quarter-finals |
| 2 | Canada | 3 | 2 | 0 | 1 | 11 | 3 | +8 | 6 | Quarter-finals |
| 3 | El Salvador | 3 | 0 | 1 | 2 | 3 | 11 | −8 | 1 | Knockout round |
| 4 | Guadeloupe | 3 | 0 | 1 | 2 | 3 | 12 | −9 | 1 | Knockout round |

Source: CONCACAF
Rules for classification: Tiebreakers
4 August 2019
8:00

| Canada | 7–0 | El Salvador |
|---|---|---|
| Mbongue 22', 24', 65'; Marshall-Rutty 32'; Assi 43', 49'; Afework 71' | Report |

IMG Academy, Bradenton
Referee: David Gómez (Costa Rica)
4 August 2019
10:00

| Slovenia | 5–0 | Guadeloupe |
|---|---|---|
| Marsetič 14'; Kljun 16'; Korošec 50'; Černe 63'; Maksimović 71' | Report |

IMG Academy, Bradenton
Referee: Wayne Cartmel (England)

5 August 2019
8:00

| Slovenia | 3–0 | Canada |
|---|---|---|
| Kamenšek 13'; Kuzmič 31'; Kljun 72' | Report |

IMG Academy, Bradenton
Referee: Melvin Herrera (Honduras)
5 August 2019
10:00

| Guadeloupe | 3–3 | El Salvador |
|---|---|---|
| Marie-Auniday 11', 53'; Anjumet 18' | Report | Guerra 9', 59'; Ortega 57' |

IMG Academy, Bradenton
Referee: Geiner Zúñiga (Costa Rica)

7 August 2019
8:00

| El Salvador | 0–1 | Slovenia |
|---|---|---|
| | Report | Rovsek 43' |

IMG Academy, Bradenton
Referee: Pierre Luc Lauziere (Canada)
7 August 2019
10:00

| Guadeloupe | 0–4 | Canada |
|---|---|---|
| | Report | Henry 13'; Volcy 36'; Lemos 57'; Coqk 61' (o.g.) |

IMG Academy, Bradenton
Referee: Kendy Sylveus (Haiti)

==== Group D ====
| Pos | Team | Pld | W | D | L | GF | GA | GD | Pts | Qualification |
|---|---|---|---|---|---|---|---|---|---|---|
| 1 | Portugal | 3 | 2 | 1 | 0 | 11 | 2 | +9 | 7 | Quarter-finals |
| 2 | Costa Rica | 3 | 2 | 1 | 0 | 7 | 3 | +4 | 7 | Quarter-finals |
| 3 | Trinidad and Tobago | 3 | 0 | 1 | 2 | 1 | 7 | −6 | 1 | Knockout round |
| 4 | Barbados | 3 | 0 | 1 | 2 | 2 | 9 | −7 | 1 | Knockout round |

Source: CONCACAF
Rules for classification: Tiebreakers
4 August 2019
8:00

| Costa Rica | 3–0 | Trinidad and Tobago |
|---|---|---|
| Pérez 5', 19'; Alcócer 15' | Report |

IMG Academy, Bradenton
Referee: Edgar Ramírez (El Salvador)
4 August 2019
10:00

| Portugal | 6–0 | Barbados |
|---|---|---|
| Marques 27' (pen.), 36'; Rodrigues 29'; Nabian 32'; Cruz 41' (pen.); Chermiti 69' | Report |

IMG Academy, Bradenton
Referee: Adonis Carrasco (Dominican Republic)

5 August 2019
8:00

| Portugal | 2–2 | Costa Rica |
|---|---|---|
| Marques 27'; Monteiro 42' | Report | Alcócer 13', 46' |

IMG Academy, Bradenton
Referee: Nima Saghafi (United States)
5 August 2019
10:00

| Barbados | 1–1 | Trinidad and Tobago |
|---|---|---|
| Butcher 65' | Report | Wilson 37' |

IMG Academy, Bradenton
Referee: Ruddy Antoine (Guadeloupe)

7 August 2019
8:00

| Trinidad and Tobago | 0–3 | Portugal |
|---|---|---|
| | Report | Nabian 47'; Cruz 67'; Marques 71' |

IMG Academy, Bradenton
Referee: David Gómez (Costa Rica)
7 August 2019
10:00

| Barbados | 1–2 | Costa Rica |
|---|---|---|
| Butcher 20' | Report | Hutson 17' (o.g.); Bennette 42' |

IMG Academy, Bradenton
Referee: Mary Toripenso (United States)

=== Knockout stage ===
==== Knockout round ====
8 August 2019

| Panama | 5–0 | El Salvador |
|---|---|---|
| | Report |

IMG Academy, Bradenton
Referee: Jamar Springer (Barbados)
8 August 2019

| Guatemala | 4–2 | Trinidad and Tobago |
|---|---|---|
| | Report |

IMG Academy, Bradenton
Referee: Víctor Rivas (USA)

8 August 2019

| Curaçao | 0–1 | Guadeloupe |
|---|---|---|
| | Report |

IMG Academy, Bradenton
Referee: Selvin Brown (Honduras)
8 August 2019

| Suriname | 2–0 | Barbados |
|---|---|---|
| | Report |

IMG Academy, Bradenton
Referee: Cole Shoemaker (Canada)

==== Bracket ====
Quarter-finals
8 August 2019
Mexico | 0
Canada | 2
8 August 2019
Slovenia (p) | 0 (4)
Israel | 0 (1)
8 August 2019
United States | 2
Costa Rica | 0
8 August 2019
Portugal | 7
Haiti | 0

Semi-finals
10 August 2019
Canada | 1
Slovenia (a.e.t.) | 2
10 August 2019
United States | 0
Portugal | 3

Final
11 August 2019
Slovenia | 0
Portugal | 2

==== Quarter-finals ====
8 August 2019

| United States | 2–0 | Costa Rica |
|---|---|---|
| | Report |

IMG Academy, Bradenton
Referee: Okeito Nicholson (Jamaica)
8 August 2019

| Portugal | 7–0 | Haiti |
|---|---|---|
| | Report |

IMG Academy, Bradenton
Referee: Filiberto Martínez (El Salvador)
8 August 2019

| Mexico | 0–2 | Canada |
|---|---|---|
| | Report | Mbongue 33'; Assi 73' |

IMG Academy, Bradenton
Referee: Benjamin Whitty (England)
8 August 2019

| Slovenia | 0–0 (a.e.t.) | Israel |
|---|---|---|
| | Report |
Penalties
| | 4–1 |

IMG Academy, Bradenton
Referee: Elchin Masiyev (Azerbaijan)

==== Semi-finals ====
10 August 2019

| United States | 0–3 | Portugal |
|---|---|---|
| | Report |

IMG Academy, Bradenton
Referee: Elchin Masiyev (Azerbaijan)
10 August 2019

| Canada | 1–2 (a.e.t.) | Slovenia |
|---|---|---|
| Assi 60' | Report | Marsetič 61'; Kljun 86' |

IMG Academy, Bradenton
Referee: Wayne Cartmel (England)

==== Final ====
11 August 2019

| Slovenia | 0–2 | Portugal |
|---|---|---|
| | Report |

IMG Academy, Bradenton
Referee: Selvin Brown (Honduras)

== Division 2 ==
=== Group stage ===
==== Group E ====
| Pos | Team | Pld | W | D | L | GF | GA | GD | Pts | Qualification |
|---|---|---|---|---|---|---|---|---|---|---|
| 1 | Nicaragua | 3 | 2 | 1 | 0 | 7 | 0 | +7 | 7 | Semi-finals |
| 2 | Guyana | 3 | 2 | 0 | 1 | 7 | 4 | +3 | 6 | Knockout round |
| 3 | Cayman Islands | 3 | 1 | 1 | 1 | 1 | 2 | −1 | 4 | Knockout round |
| 4 | Bahamas | 3 | 0 | 0 | 3 | 1 | 10 | −9 | 0 | Knockout round |

Source: CONCACAF
Rules for classification: Tiebreakers
5 August 2019

| Nicaragua | 3–0 | Guyana |
|---|---|---|
| | Report |

IMG Academy, Bradenton
Referee: Ivan Zupan (Croatia)
5 August 2019

| Cayman Islands | 1–0 | Bahamas |
|---|---|---|
| | Report |

IMG Academy, Bradenton
Referee: Okeito Nicholson (Jamaica)

6 August 2019

| Cayman Islands | 0–0 | Nicaragua |
|---|---|---|
| | Report |

IMG Academy, Bradenton
Referee: Edgar Ramírez (El Salvador)
6 August 2019

| Bahamas | 1–5 | Guyana |
|---|---|---|
| | Report |

IMG Academy, Bradenton
Referee: Reinaldo Sequeira (Costa Rica)

8 August 2019

| Guyana | 2–0 | Cayman Islands |
|---|---|---|
| | Report |

IMG Academy, Bradenton
Referee: José Raúl Eduarte (Costa Rica)
8 August 2019

| Bahamas | 0–4 | Nicaragua |
|---|---|---|
| | Report |

IMG Academy, Bradenton
Referee: Adonis Carrasco (Dominican Republic)

==== Group F ====
| Pos | Team | Pld | W | D | L | GF | GA | GD | Pts | Qualification |
|---|---|---|---|---|---|---|---|---|---|---|
| 1 | Puerto Rico | 3 | 2 | 1 | 0 | 5 | 2 | +3 | 7 | Semi-finals |
| 2 | Martinique | 3 | 2 | 0 | 1 | 7 | 5 | +2 | 6 | Knockout round |
| 3 | Grenada | 3 | 0 | 2 | 1 | 2 | 4 | −2 | 2 | Knockout round |
| 4 | Dominican Republic | 3 | 0 | 1 | 2 | 0 | 3 | −3 | 1 | Knockout round |

Source: CONCACAF
Rules for classification: Tiebreakers
5 August 2019

| Dominican Republic | 0–2 | Puerto Rico |
|---|---|---|
| | Report |

IMG Academy, Bradenton
Referee: Dwayne Simpson (Cayman Islands)
5 August 2019

| Grenada | 2–4 | Martinique |
|---|---|---|
| | Report |

IMG Academy, Bradenton
Referee: Mozes Keketi (Suriname)

6 August 2019

| Grenada | 0–0 | Dominican Republic |
|---|---|---|
| | Report |

IMG Academy, Bradenton
Referee: Elchin Masiyev (Azerbaijan)
6 August 2019

| Martinique | 2–3 | Puerto Rico |
|---|---|---|
| | Report |

IMG Academy, Bradenton
Referee: Kwinsi Williams (Trinidad and Tobago)

8 August 2019

| Puerto Rico | 0–0 | Grenada |
|---|---|---|
| | Report |

IMG Academy, Bradenton
Referee: Reinaldo Sequeira (Costa Rica)
8 August 2019

| Martinique | 1–0 | Dominican Republic |
|---|---|---|
| | Report |

IMG Academy, Bradenton
Referee: Luis Alfredo García (Mexico)

==== Group G ====
| Pos | Team | Pld | W | D | L | GF | GA | GD | Pts | Qualification |
|---|---|---|---|---|---|---|---|---|---|---|
| 1 | Saint Lucia | 3 | 3 | 0 | 0 | 7 | 2 | +5 | 9 | Semi-finals |
| 2 | French Guiana | 3 | 2 | 0 | 1 | 5 | 3 | +2 | 6 | Knockout round |
| 3 | Belize | 3 | 1 | 0 | 2 | 4 | 5 | −1 | 3 | Knockout round |
| 4 | Saint Kitts and Nevis | 3 | 0 | 0 | 3 | 2 | 8 | −6 | 0 | Knockout round |

Source: CONCACAF
Rules for classification: Tiebreakers
5 August 2019

| Saint Lucia | 3–1 | Saint Kitts and Nevis |
|---|---|---|
| | Report |

IMG Academy, Bradenton
Referee: Mary Tory Penso (USA)
5 August 2019

| French Guiana | 3–0 | Belize |
|---|---|---|
| | Report |

IMG Academy, Bradenton
Referee: Víctor Rivas (USA)

6 August 2019

| French Guiana | 0–2 | Saint Lucia |
|---|---|---|
| | Report |

IMG Academy, Bradenton
Referee: Steffon Dewar (Jamaica)
6 August 2019

| Belize | 3–0 | Saint Kitts and Nevis |
|---|---|---|
| | Report |

IMG Academy, Bradenton
Referee: Brayan Cruz (Costa Rica)

8 August 2019

| Saint Kitts and Nevis | 1–2 | French Guiana |
|---|---|---|
| | Report |

IMG Academy, Bradenton
Referee: Nicolas Wassouf (Martinique)
8 August 2019

| Belize | 1–2 | Saint Lucia |
|---|---|---|
| | Report |

IMG Academy, Bradenton
Referee: Kwinsi Williams (Trinidad and Tobago)

==== Group H ====
| Pos | Team | Pld | W | D | L | GF | GA | GD | Pts | Qualification |
|---|---|---|---|---|---|---|---|---|---|---|
| 1 | Bermuda | 3 | 2 | 1 | 0 | 9 | 4 | +5 | 7 | Semi-finals |
| 2 | Antigua and Barbuda | 3 | 2 | 0 | 1 | 8 | 5 | +3 | 6 | Knockout round |
| 3 | Saint Vincent and the Grenadines | 3 | 1 | 1 | 1 | 8 | 5 | +3 | 4 | Knockout round |
| 4 | Aruba | 3 | 0 | 0 | 3 | 2 | 13 | −11 | 0 | Knockout round |

Source: CONCACAF
Rules for classification: Tiebreakers
5 August 2019

| Bermuda | 3–0 | Antigua and Barbuda |
|---|---|---|
| | Report |

IMG Academy, Bradenton
Referee: Benjamin Whitty (England)
5 August 2019

| Aruba | 0–4 | Saint Vincent and the Grenadines |
|---|---|---|
| | Report |

IMG Academy, Bradenton
Referee: Bradley Doubrough (Canada)

6 August 2019

| Aruba | 2–4 | Bermuda |
|---|---|---|
| | Report |

IMG Academy, Bradenton
Referee: Adonis Carrasco (Dominican Republic)
6 August 2019

| Saint Vincent and the Grenadines | 2–3 | Antigua and Barbuda |
|---|---|---|
| | Report |

IMG Academy, Bradenton
Referee: Natalie Simon (USA)

8 August 2019

| Antigua and Barbuda | 5–0 | Aruba |
|---|---|---|
| | Report |

IMG Academy, Bradenton
Referee: Russy Antoine (Guadeloupe)
8 August 2019

| Saint Vincent and the Grenadines | 2–2 | Bermuda |
|---|---|---|
| | Report |

IMG Academy, Bradenton
Referee: Edgar Ramírez (El Salvador)

=== Knockout stage ===
==== Knockout round ====
9 August 2019

| Guyana | 1–1 | French Guiana |
|---|---|---|
| | Report |

IMG Academy, Bradenton
Referee: Sebastian Noshinravani (Canada)
9 August 2019

| Martinique | 1–0 | Antigua and Barbuda |
|---|---|---|
| | Report |

IMG Academy, Bradenton
Referee: Saphire Stockman (Costa Rica)

9 August 2019

| Cayman Islands | 1–1 | Belize |
|---|---|---|
| | Report |

IMG Academy, Bradenton
Referee: David Gómez (Costa Rica)
9 August 2019

| Grenada | 0–0 | Saint Vincent and the Grenadines |
|---|---|---|
| | Report |

IMG Academy, Bradenton
Referee: Neressa Goldson (Jamaica)

9 August 2019

| Bahamas | 3–0 (w/o) | Saint Kitts and Nevis |

IMG Academy, Bradenton
9 August 2019

| Dominican Republic | 4–1 | Aruba |
|---|---|---|
| | Report |

IMG Academy, Bradenton
Referee: Bradley Doubrough (Canada)

==== Bracket ====
Semi-finals
9 August 2019
Nicaragua | 2
Saint Lucia | 3
9 August 2019
Puerto Rico | 2
Bermuda | 1

Final
10 August 2019
Saint Lucia | 3
Puerto Rico | 1

==== Semi-finals ====
9 August 2019

| Nicaragua | 2–3 (a.e.t.) | Saint Lucia |
|---|---|---|
| | Report |

IMG Academy, Bradenton
Referee: Pierre Luc Lauziere (Canada)
9 August 2019

| Puerto Rico | 2–1 | Bermuda |
|---|---|---|
| | Report |

IMG Academy, Bradenton
Referee: Ivan Zupan (Croatia)

==== Final ====
10 August 2019

| Saint Lucia | 3–1 | Puerto Rico |
|---|---|---|
| | Report |

IMG Academy, Bradenton
Referee: Mary Tori Penso (USA)

== Division 3 ==
=== Group stage ===
==== Group I ====
| Pos | Team | Pld | W | D | L | GF | GA | GD | Pts | Qualification |
|---|---|---|---|---|---|---|---|---|---|---|
| 1 | Sint Maarten | 3 | 2 | 1 | 0 | 5 | 0 | +5 | 7 | Final |
| 2 | Bonaire | 3 | 2 | 1 | 0 | 5 | 1 | +4 | 7 | Knockout round |
| 3 | U.S. Virgin Islands | 3 | 1 | 0 | 2 | 6 | 6 | 0 | 3 | Knockout round |
| 4 | Anguilla | 3 | 0 | 0 | 3 | 1 | 10 | −9 | 0 | Knockout round |

Source: CONCACAF
Rules for classification: Tiebreakers
5 August 2019

| U.S. Virgin Islands | 5–1 | Anguilla |
|---|---|---|
| | Report |

IMG Academy, Bradenton
Referee: Kendy Sylveus (Haiti)
5 August 2019

| Sint Maarten | 0–0 | Bonaire |
|---|---|---|
| | Report |

IMG Academy, Bradenton
Referee: Luis Alfredo García (Mexico)

6 August 2019

| U.S. Virgin Islands | 1–4 | Bonaire |
|---|---|---|
| | Report |

IMG Academy, Bradenton
Referee: Nicolas Wassouf (Martinique)
6 August 2019

| Anguilla | 0–4 | Sint Maarten |
|---|---|---|
| | Report |

IMG Academy, Bradenton
Referee: Saphire Stockman (Costa Rica)

8 August 2019

| Anguilla | 0–1 | Bonaire |
|---|---|---|
| | Report |

IMG Academy, Bradenton
Referee: Yusri Rudolf (Canada)
8 August 2019

| Sint Maarten | 1–0 | U.S. Virgin Islands |
|---|---|---|
| | Report |

IMG Academy, Bradenton
Referee: Melvin Herrera (Honduras)

==== Group J ====
| Pos | Team | Pld | W | D | L | GF | GA | GD | Pts | Qualification |
|---|---|---|---|---|---|---|---|---|---|---|
| 1 | British Virgin Islands | 4 | 3 | 1 | 0 | 13 | 4 | +9 | 10 | Final |
| 2 | Dominica | 4 | 3 | 1 | 0 | 10 | 6 | +4 | 10 | Knockout round |
| 3 | Montserrat | 4 | 1 | 1 | 2 | 5 | 6 | −1 | 4 | Knockout round |
| 4 | Turks and Caicos Islands | 4 | 1 | 0 | 3 | 4 | 8 | −4 | 3 | Knockout round |
| 5 | Saint Martin | 4 | 0 | 1 | 3 | 5 | 13 | −8 | 1 | Knockout round |

Source: CONCACAF
Rules for classification: Tiebreakers
4 August 2019

| Montserrat | 2–0 | Turks and Caicos Islands |
|---|---|---|
| | Report |

IMG Academy, Bradenton
Referee: Saphire Stockman (Costa Rica)
4 August 2019

| British Virgin Islands | 3–3 | Dominica |
|---|---|---|
| | Report |

IMG Academy, Bradenton
Referee: Neressa Goldson (Jamaica)

5 August 2019

| Montserrat | 0–2 | British Virgin Islands |
|---|---|---|
| | Report |

IMG Academy, Bradenton
Referee: Ismael Matos Guzmán (Aruba)
5 August 2019

| Turks and Caicos Islands | 3–1 | Saint Martin |
|---|---|---|
| | Report |

IMG Academy, Bradenton
Referee: Sebastian Noshinravani (Canada)

6 August 2019

| Turks and Caicos Islands | 1–3 | Dominica |
|---|---|---|
| | Report |

IMG Academy, Bradenton
Referee: Selvin Brown (Honduras)
6 August 2019

| Saint Martin | 2–2 | Montserrat |
|---|---|---|
| | Report |

IMG Academy, Bradenton
Referee: Neressa Goldson (Jamaica)

7 August 2019

| Dominica | 2–1 | Saint Martin |
|---|---|---|
| | Report |

IMG Academy, Bradenton
Referee: Mozes Keketi (Suriname)
7 August 2019

| British Virgin Islands | 2–0 | Turks and Caicos Islands |
|---|---|---|
| | Report |

IMG Academy, Bradenton
Referee: Bradley Doubrough (Canada)

8 August 2019

| British Virgin Islands | 6–1 | Saint Martin |
|---|---|---|
| | Report |

IMG Academy, Bradenton
Referee: Steffon Dewar (Jamaica)
8 August 2019

| Montserrat | 1–2 | Dominica |
|---|---|---|
| | Report |

IMG Academy, Bradenton
Referee: Ismael Matos Guzmán (Aruba)

=== Knockout stage ===
==== Knockout round ====
10 August 2019

| Bonaire | 0–0 | Dominica |
|---|---|---|
| | Report |

IMG Academy, Bradenton
Referee: Filiberto Martínez (El Salvador)
10 August 2019

| U.S. Virgin Islands | 2–1 | Montserrat |
|---|---|---|
| | Report |

IMG Academy, Bradenton
Referee: Okeito Nicholson (Jamaica)
10 August 2019

| Anguilla | 0–0 | Turks and Caicos Islands |
|---|---|---|
| | Report |

IMG Academy, Bradenton
Referee: Benjamin Whitty (England)
10 August 2019

| Little Haiti | 3–4 | Saint Martin |
|---|---|---|
| | Report |

IMG Academy, Bradenton

==== Final ====
10 August 2019

| Sint Maarten | 0–7 | British Virgin Islands |
|---|---|---|
| | Report |

IMG Academy, Bradenton
Referee: Jamar Springer (Barbados)
