= 2019 in American soccer =

Soccer in the United States
- Season: 2019

Men's soccer
- Supporters' Shield: Los Angeles FC
- USL Championship: Real Monarchs SLC
- USL League One: North Texas SC
- NPSL: Miami FC
- USL League Two: Flint City Bucks
- US Open Cup: Atlanta United FC
- MLS Cup: Seattle Sounders FC

Women's soccer
- NWSL: North Carolina Courage
- WPSL: Pensacola FC Women
- UWS: LA Galaxy Orange County

The 2019 season was the 107th season of competitive soccer in the United States.

== National teams ==
=== Men's ===
==== Senior ====
As of November 19, 2019.

| Wins | Losses | Draws |
|---|---|---|
| 11 | 5 | 2 |

===== Friendlies =====
| January 27 | United States | 3–0 | Panama | Glendale, Arizona |
| 20:00 ET | Mihailovic 40'; Zimmerman 80'; Ramirez 89' | Report | | Stadium: State Farm Stadium; Attendance: 9,040; Referee: Adonai Escobedo (Mexico) |

| February 2 | United States | 2–0 | Costa Rica | San Jose, California |
| 15:30 ET | Lletget 80'; Arriola 88' | Report | | Stadium: Avaya Stadium; Attendance: 13,656; Referee: Fernando Hernandez (Mexico) |

| March 21 | United States | 1–0 | Ecuador | Orlando, Florida |
| 20:00 ET | Zardes 81' | Report | | Stadium: Orlando City Stadium; Attendance: 17,422; Referee: David Gantar (Canada) |

| March 26 | United States | 1–1 | Chile | Houston, Texas |
| 19:55 ET | Pulisic 4' | Report | Opazo 9' | Stadium: BBVA Compass Stadium; Attendance: 18,033; Referee: Daneon Parchment (Jamaica) |

| June 5 | United States | 0–1 | Jamaica | Washington, D.C. |
| 19:00 ET | | Report | Nicholson 60' | Stadium: Audi Field; Attendance: 17,719; Referee: Kimbett Ward (Saint Kitts and Nevis) |

| June 9 | United States | 0–3 | Venezuela | Cincinnati, Ohio |
| 14:00 ET | | Report | Rondón 16', 36'; Savarino 30' | Stadium: Nippert Stadium; Attendance: 23,955; Referee: Bryan López (Guatemala) |

| September 6 | United States | 0–3 | Mexico | East Rutherford, New Jersey |
| 21:00 ET | | Report | J. Hernández 21'; Gutiérrez 78'; Antuna 82' | Stadium: MetLife Stadium; Attendance: 47,960; Referee: Joel Aguilar (El Salvador) |

| September 10 | United States | 1–1 | Uruguay | St Louis, Missouri |
| 20:00 ET | Morris 79' | Report | B. Rodríguez 50' | Stadium: Busch Stadium; Attendance: 20,625; Referee: Ricardo Montero (Costa Rica) |

===== CONCACAF Gold Cup =====
====== Group D ======
| Pos | Team | Pld | W | D | L | GF | GA | GD | Pts | Qualification |
|---|---|---|---|---|---|---|---|---|---|---|
| 1 | United States (H) | 3 | 3 | 0 | 0 | 11 | 0 | +11 | 9 | Advance to knockout stage |
| 2 | Panama | 3 | 2 | 0 | 1 | 6 | 3 | +3 | 6 | Advance to knockout stage |
| 3 | Guyana | 3 | 0 | 1 | 2 | 3 | 9 | −6 | 1 | |
| 4 | Trinidad and Tobago | 3 | 0 | 1 | 2 | 1 | 9 | −8 | 1 | |

Source: CONCACAF
(H) Hosts

| June 18 | United States | 4–0 | Guyana | Saint Paul, Minnesota |
| 22:00 ET | Arriola 28'; Boyd 51', 81'; Zardes 55' | Report | | Stadium: Allianz Field; Attendance: 19,418; Referee: Iván Barton (El Salvador) |

| June 22 | United States | 6–0 | Trinidad and Tobago | Cleveland, Ohio |
| 22:00 ET | Long 41', 90'; Zardes 66', 69'; Pulisic 73'; Arriola 78' | Report | | Stadium: FirstEnergy Stadium; Attendance: 23,921; Referee: Said Martínez (Honduras) |

| June 26 | Panama | 0–1 | United States | Kansas City, Kansas |
| 21:00 ET | | Report | Altidore 66' | Stadium: Children's Mercy Park; Attendance: 17,037; Referee: Abdulrahman Al-Jassim (Qatar) |

====== Knockout stage ======
| June 30 QF | United States | 1–0 | Curaçao | Philadelphia, Pennsylvania |
| 20:30 ET | McKennie 25' | Report | | Stadium: Lincoln Financial Field; Attendance: 26,233; Referee: Adonai Escobedo (Mexico) |

| July 3 SF | Jamaica | 1–3 | United States | Nashville, Tennessee |
| 21:30 ET | Nicholson 69' | Report | McKennie 9'; Pulisic 52', 87' | Stadium: Nissan Stadium; Attendance: 28,473; Referee: Iván Barton (El Salvador) |

====== Final ======
July 7, 2019
21:15 (20:15 UTC−5)

| Mexico | 1–0 | United States |
|---|---|---|
| Dos Santos 73' | Report |

Soldier Field, Chicago
Attendance: 62,493
Referee: Mario Escobar (Guatemala)

===== 2019–20 CONCACAF Nations League =====
====== Group A ======
| Pos | Team | Pld | W | D | L | GF | GA | GD | Pts | Qualification or relegation | (United States) | (Canada) | (Cuba) |
|---|---|---|---|---|---|---|---|---|---|---|---|---|---|
| 1 | United States | 4 | 3 | 0 | 1 | 15 | 3 | +12 | 9 | Qualification for Finals and Gold Cup | — | 4–1 | 7–0 |
| 2 | Canada | 4 | 3 | 0 | 1 | 10 | 4 | +6 | 9 | Qualification for Gold Cup | 2–0 | — | 6–0 |
| 3 | Cuba (R) | 4 | 0 | 0 | 4 | 0 | 18 | −18 | 0 | Gold Cup prelims and League B | 0–4 | 0–1 | — |

Source: CONCACAF
(R) Relegated

| October 11 | United States | 7–0 | Cuba | Washington, D.C. |
| 19:00 ET | McKennie 1', 5', 13'; Morris 9'; Ramos 37' (o.g.); Sargent 40'; Pulisic 62' (pen.) | Report | | Stadium: Audi Field; Attendance: 13,784; Referee: Jose Torres (Puerto Rico) |

| October 15 | Canada | 2–0 | United States | Toronto, Canada |
| 19:30 ET | Davies 63'; Cavallini 90+1' | Report | | Stadium: BMO Field; Attendance: 17,126; Referee: Daneon Parchment (Jamaica) |

| November 15 | United States | 4–1 | Canada | Orlando, Florida |
| 19:00 ET | Morris 2'; Zardes 23', 89'; Long 34' | Report | Vitória 72' | Stadium: Exploria Stadium; Attendance: 13,103; Referee: César Arturo Ramos (Mexico) |

| November 19 | Cuba | 0–4 | United States | George Town, Cayman Islands |
| 19:30 ET | | Report | Sargent 1', 66'; Morris 26', 39' | Stadium: Truman Bodden Sports Complex; Referee: John Pitti (Panama) |

===== Goalscorers =====
Goals are current as of November 19, 2019, after the match against Cuba.

| Player | Goals |
|---|---|
| Gyasi Zardes | 6 |
| Christian Pulisic | 5 |
| Weston McKennie | 5 |
| Jordan Morris | 5 |
| Paul Arriola | 3 |
| Aaron Long | 3 |
| Josh Sargent | 3 |
| Tyler Boyd | 2 |
| Djordje Mihailovic | 1 |
| Walker Zimmerman | 1 |
| Christian Ramirez | 1 |
| Sebastian Lletget | 1 |
| Jozy Altidore | 1 |
| own goal | 1 |

==== U-20 ====
===== FIFA U-20 World Cup =====
====== Group D ======
| Pos | Team | Pld | W | D | L | GF | GA | GD | Pts | Qualification |
|---|---|---|---|---|---|---|---|---|---|---|
| 1 | Ukraine | 3 | 2 | 1 | 0 | 4 | 2 | +2 | 7 | Knockout stage |
| 2 | United States | 3 | 2 | 0 | 1 | 4 | 2 | +2 | 6 | Knockout stage |
| 3 | Nigeria | 3 | 1 | 1 | 1 | 5 | 3 | +2 | 4 | Knockout stage |
| 4 | Qatar | 3 | 0 | 0 | 3 | 0 | 6 | −6 | 0 | |

Source: FIFA
Rules for classification: Group stage tiebreakers

| May 24 Group D | Ukraine | 2–1 | United States | Bielsko-Biała, Poland |
| 14:30 ET | Buletsa 26'; Popov 51' | Report | Servania 32' | Stadium: Stadion Miejski; Attendance: 4,310; Referee: Maguette N'Diaye (Senegal) |

| May 27 Group D | United States | 2–0 | Nigeria | Bielsko-Biała, Poland |
| 14:30 ET | Soto 18', 46' | Report | | Stadium: Stadion Miejski; Attendance: 3,427; Referee: Benoît Bastien (France) |

| May 30 Group D | United States | 1–0 | Qatar | Tychy, Poland |
| 14:30 ET | Weah 76' | Report | | Stadium: Stadion Miejski w Tychach; Attendance: 3,651; Referee: Abdelkader Zitouni (Tahiti) |

| June 4 Round of 16 | France | 2–3 | United States | Bydgoszcz, Poland |
| 11:30 ET | Gouiri 41'; Alioui 55' | Report | Soto 25', 74'; Rennicks 83' | Stadium: Bydgoszcz Stadium; Attendance: 8,469; Referee: Raphael Claus (Brazil) |

| June 8 Quarter-finals | United States | 1–2 | Ecuador | Gdynia, Poland |
| 11:30 ET | Weah 36' | | Cifuentes 30'; Espinoza 43' | Stadium: Gdynia Stadium; Attendance: 6,389; Referee: Benoît Bastien (France) |

==== U-17 ====
===== CONCACAF U-17 Championship =====
====== Group F ======
| Pos | Team | Pld | W | D | L | GF | GA | GD | Pts | Qualification |
|---|---|---|---|---|---|---|---|---|---|---|
| 1 | United States (H) | 3 | 3 | 0 | 0 | 12 | 3 | +9 | 9 | Round of 16 |
| 2 | Canada | 3 | 2 | 0 | 1 | 10 | 5 | +5 | 6 | Round of 16 |
| 3 | Guatemala | 3 | 0 | 1 | 2 | 3 | 8 | −5 | 1 | Round of 16 |
| 4 | Barbados | 3 | 0 | 1 | 2 | 2 | 11 | −9 | 1 | |

Source: CONCACAF
Rules for classification: Tie-breakers
(H) Hosts

| May 2 Group F | United States | 3–2 | Canada | Bradenton, Florida |
| 18:00 ET | Busio 49'; Alejandre 63'; Reyna 69' | Report | Omeonga 21'; Russell 22' | Stadium: IMG Academy; Attendance: 350; Referee: Oshane Nation (Jamaica) |

| May 4 Group F | Barbados | 1–6 | United States | Bradenton, Florida |
| 16:00 ET | Richards 54' (pen.) | Report | Hernandez-Foster 20'; Busio 26', 45'; Saldana 33'; Bryan 47' (o.g.); Ocampo-Chavez 50' | Stadium: IMG Academy; Attendance: 215; Referee: Ismael Cornejo (El Salvador) |

| May 6 Group F | Guatemala | 0–3 | United States | Bradenton, Florida |
| 18:00 ET | | Report | Yow 25', 51'; Ocampo-Chavez 86' | Stadium: IMG Academy; Attendance: 110; Referee: Yadel Martinez (Cuba) |

| May 9 Round of 16 | United States | 8–0 | Guadeloupe | Bradenton, Florida |
| 18:00 ET | Ocampo-Chavez 3', 68'; Yow 11'; Reyna 20', 29', 42'; Busio 26'; Pepi 70' | | | Stadium: IMG Academy; Referee: Henry Bejarano (Costa Rica) |

| May 12 Quarter-finals | United States | 3–0 | Panama | Bradenton, Florida |
| 15:00 | | Report | | Stadium: IMG Academy; Attendance: 129 |

| May 14 Semi-finals | United States | 4–0 | Canada | Bradenton, Florida |
| 16:30 | Kayo 47'; Reyna 64'; Pepi 78', 82' | Report | | Stadium: IMG Academy; Attendance: 113; Referee: Ismael Cornejo (El Salvador) |

| May 16 Final | Mexico | 2–1 | United States | Bradenton, Florida |
| 19:00 | Muñoz 17'; Luna 108' | Report | Yow 9' | Stadium: IMG Academy; Attendance: 700; Referee: Daneon Parchment (Jamaica) |

===== FIFA U-17 World Cup =====
====== Group D ======
| Pos | Team | Pld | W | D | L | GF | GA | GD | Pts | Qualification |
|---|---|---|---|---|---|---|---|---|---|---|
| 1 | Japan | 3 | 2 | 1 | 0 | 4 | 0 | +4 | 7 | Advance to knockout stage |
| 2 | Senegal | 3 | 2 | 0 | 1 | 7 | 3 | +4 | 6 | Advance to knockout stage |
| 3 | Netherlands | 3 | 1 | 0 | 2 | 5 | 6 | −1 | 3 | Advance to knockout stage |
| 4 | United States | 3 | 0 | 1 | 2 | 1 | 8 | −7 | 1 | |

Source: FIFA
Rules for classification: Group stage tiebreakers

| October 27 Group Stage | United States | 1–4 | Senegal | Cariacica, Brazil |
| 16:00 ET | Busio 3' | Report | S. Faye 45+3'; Balde 72'; A. Faye 76'; Sarr 88' | Stadium: Estádio Kléber Andrade; Attendance: 4,266; Referee: István Kovács (Romania) |

| October 30 Group Stage | United States | 0–0 | Japan | Cariacica, Brazil |
| 19:00 ET | | Report | | Stadium: Estádio Kléber Andrade; Attendance: 3,878; Referee: Guillermo Guerrero (Ecuador) |

| November 2 Group Stage | Netherlands | 4–0 | United States | Goiânia, Brazil |
| 19:00 ET | Hansen 42', 51'; Taabouni 70'; Braaf 86' | Report | | Stadium: Estádio da Serrinha; Attendance: 1,305; Referee: Amin Mohamed Omar (Egypt) |

==== U-15 ====
===== CONCACAF U-15 Championship =====
====== Group B ======
| Pos | Team | Pld | W | D | L | GF | GA | GD | Pts | Qualification |
|---|---|---|---|---|---|---|---|---|---|---|
| 1 | United States (H) | 3 | 3 | 0 | 0 | 9 | 0 | +9 | 9 | Quarter-finals |
| 2 | Haiti | 3 | 1 | 1 | 1 | 2 | 3 | −1 | 4 | Quarter-finals |
| 3 | Guatemala | 3 | 1 | 1 | 1 | 2 | 4 | −2 | 4 | Knockout round |
| 4 | Suriname | 3 | 0 | 0 | 3 | 0 | 6 | −6 | 0 | Knockout round |

Source: CONCACAF
Rules for classification: Tiebreakers
(H) Hosts

| 4 August 2019 Group B | United States | 2–0 | Haiti | Bradenton, Florida |
| 8:00 | Oliva 5'; Jauregui 61' | Report | | Stadium: IMG Academy; Referee: Selvin Brown (Honduras) |

| 5 August 2019 Group B | United States | 3–0 | Guatemala | Bradenton, Florida |
| 8:00 | Váldez 10'; Cisneros 16'; Jauregui 55' | Report | | Stadium: IMG Academy; Referee: Cole Shoemaker (Canada) |

| 7 August 2019 Group B | Suriname | 0–4 | United States | IMG Academy, Bradenton |
| 8:00 | | Report | Váldez 3', 13' (pen.), 41'; Oliva 30' | Referee: Geiner Zúñiga (Costa Rica) |

| August 8 Quarterfinals | United States | 2–0 | Costa Rica | Bradenton, Florida |
| | | Report | | Stadium: IMG Academy; Referee: Okeito Nicholson (Jamaica) |

| August 10 Semifinals | United States | 0–3 | Portugal | Bradenton, Florida |
| 15:00 | | Report | | Stadium: IMG Academy; Referee: Elchin Masiyev (Azerbaijan) |

=== Women's ===
==== Senior ====
As of November 10, 2019.

| Wins | Losses | Draws |
|---|---|---|
| 20 | 1 | 3 |

===== Friendlies =====
| January 19 | France | 3–1 | United States | Le Havre, France |
| 14:30 ET | Diani 9', 57'; Katoto 78' | Report | Pugh 90+1' | Stadium: Stade Océane; Attendance: 22,780; Referee: Pernilla Larsson (Sweden) |

| January 22 | Spain | 0–1 | United States | Alicante, Spain |
| 14:30 ET | | Report | Press 54' | Stadium: Estadio José Rico Perez; Attendance: 9,182; Referee: Stéphanie Frappart (France) |

| April 4 | United States | 5–3 | Australia | Commerce City, Colorado |
| 21:00 ET | Morgan 14'; Heath 53'; Rapinoe 61'; Pugh 67', 90+5' | Report | De Vanna 29'; Foord 47'; Kerr 81' | Stadium: Dick's Sporting Goods Park; Attendance: 17,264; Referee: Karen Abt (United States) |

| April 7 | United States | 6–0 | Belgium | Los Angeles, California |
| 21:00 ET | Lloyd 14', 19'; Horan 26'; Mewis 33'; Morgan 52'; McDonald 90+1' | Report | | Stadium: Banc of California Stadium; Attendance: 20,941; Referee: Ekaterina Koroleva (United States) |

| May 12 | United States | 3–0 | South Africa | Santa Clara, California |
| 16:30 ET | Mewis 37', 78'; Lloyd 90+2' | Report | | Stadium: Levi's Stadium; Attendance: 22,788; Referee: Odette Hamilton (Jamaica) |

| May 16 | United States | 5–0 | New Zealand | St. Louis, Missouri |
| 20:00 ET | Heath 35'; Lavelle 40'; Lloyd 61', 83'; Mewis 84' | Report | | Stadium: Busch Stadium; Attendance: 35,761; Referee: Karen Abt (United States) |

| May 26 | United States | 3–0 | Mexico | Harrison, New Jersey |
| 12:00 ET | Heath 11'; Pugh 76'; Press 88' | Report | | Stadium: Red Bull Arena; Attendance: 26,332; Referee: Crystal Sobers (Trinidad and Tobago) |

| August 3 | United States | 3–0 | Republic of Ireland | Pasadena, California |
| 22:00 ET | Heath 16'; Horan 31'; Lloyd 41' | Report | | Stadium: Rose Bowl; Attendance: 37,040; Referee: Ekaterina Koroleva (United States) |

| August 29 | United States | 4–0 | Portugal | Philadelphia, Pennsylvania |
| 19:00 ET | Heath 4'; Brian 18'; Lloyd 52'; Long 82' | Report | | Stadium: Lincoln Financial Field; Attendance: 49,504; Referee: Ekaterina Koroleva (United States) |

| September 3 | United States | 3–0 | Portugal | Saint Paul, Minnesota |
| 20:00 ET | Lloyd 22', 32' (pen.); Horan 83' | Report | | Stadium: Allianz Field; Attendance: 19,600; Referee: Ekaterina Koroleva (United States) |

| October 3 | United States | 2–0 | South Korea | Charlotte, North Carolina |
| 19:00 ET | Long 45+3'; Pugh 76' | Report | | Stadium: Bank of America Stadium; Attendance: 30,071; Referee: Gillian Martindale (Barbados) |

| October 6 | United States | 1–1 | South Korea | Chicago, Illinois |
| 14:00 ET | Lloyd 37' | Report | Ji 34' | Stadium: Soldier Field; Attendance: 33,027; Referee: Katia Garcia (Mexico) |

| November 7 | United States | 3–2 | Sweden | Columbus, Ohio |
| 19:30 ET | Lloyd 6', 31'; Press 28' | Report | Anvegård 75', 79' | Stadium: MAPFRE Stadium; Attendance: 20,903; Referee: Ekaterina Koroleva (United States) |

| November 10 | United States | 6–0 | Costa Rica | Jacksonville, Florida |
| 20:00 ET | Lloyd 4'; Brian 10'; Williams 50', 68'; Press 56'; Blanco 86' (o.g.) | Report | | Stadium: TIAA Bank Field; Attendance: 12,914; Referee: Karen Abt (United States) |

===== SheBelieves Cup =====
| Pos | Team | Pld | W | D | L | GF | GA | GD | Pts |
|---|---|---|---|---|---|---|---|---|---|
| 1 | England (C) | 3 | 2 | 1 | 0 | 7 | 3 | +4 | 7 |
| 2 | United States (H) | 3 | 1 | 2 | 0 | 5 | 4 | +1 | 5 |
| 3 | Japan | 3 | 1 | 1 | 1 | 5 | 6 | −1 | 4 |
| 4 | Brazil | 3 | 0 | 0 | 3 | 2 | 6 | −4 | 0 |

Source: USSoccer
Rules for classification: 1) points; 2) goal difference; 3) goals scored; 4) head-to-head result; 5) FIFA ranking.
(C) Champions; (H) Hosts

| February 27 | United States | 2–2 | Japan | Chester, Pennsylvania |
| 19:00 ET | Rapinoe 23'; Morgan 76' | Report | Nakajima 67'; Momiki 90+1' | Stadium: Talen Energy Stadium; Attendance: 14,555; Referee: Melissa Borjas (Honduras) |

| March 2 | United States | 2–2 | England | Nashville, Tennessee |
| 16:30 ET | Rapinoe 32'; Heath 66' | Report | Houghton 35'; Parris 52' | Stadium: Nissan Stadium; Attendance: 22,125; Referee: Marianela Araya (Costa Rica) |

| March 5 | United States | 1–0 | Brazil | Tampa, Florida |
| 20:00 ET | Heath 20' | Report | | Stadium: Raymond James Stadium; Attendance: 14,009; Referee: Carol Anne Chénard (Canada) |

===== FIFA Women's World Cup =====
Match start times CEST (UTC+2), unless noted with ET (UTC-4)

====== Group F ======
| Pos | Team | Pld | W | D | L | GF | GA | GD | Pts | Qualification |
|---|---|---|---|---|---|---|---|---|---|---|
| 1 | United States | 3 | 3 | 0 | 0 | 18 | 0 | +18 | 9 | Advance to knockout stage |
| 2 | Sweden | 3 | 2 | 0 | 1 | 7 | 3 | +4 | 6 | Advance to knockout stage |
| 3 | Chile | 3 | 1 | 0 | 2 | 2 | 5 | −3 | 3 | |
| 4 | Thailand | 3 | 0 | 0 | 3 | 1 | 20 | −19 | 0 | |

Source: FIFA
Rules for classification: Group stage tiebreakers

| June 11 FIFA World Cup GS | United States | 13–0 | Thailand | Reims, France |
| 15:00 ET | Morgan 12', 53', 74', 81', 87'; Lavelle 20', 56'; Horan 32'; Mewis 50', 54'; Rapinoe 79'; Pugh 84'; Lloyd 90+2' | Report | | Stadium: Stade Auguste-Delaune; Attendance: 18,591; Referee: Laura Fortunato (Argentina) |

| June 16 FIFA World Cup GS | United States | 3–0 | Chile | Paris, France |
| 12:00 ET | Lloyd 11', 35'; Ertz 26' | Report | | Stadium: Parc des Princes; Attendance: 45,594; Referee: Riem Hussein (Germany) |

| June 20 FIFA World Cup GS | Sweden | 0–2 | United States | Le Havre, France |
| 15:00 ET | | Report | Horan 3'; Andersson 50' (o.g.) | Stadium: Stade Océane, Le Havre; Attendance: 22,418; Referee: Anastasia Pustovoitova (Russia) |

====== Knockout stage ======
| June 24 Round of 16 | Spain | 1–2 | United States | Reims, France |
| 12:00 ET | Hermoso 9' | Report | Rapinoe 7' (pen.), 76' (pen.) | Stadium: Stade Auguste-Delaune; Attendance: 19,633; Referee: Katalin Kulcsár (Hungary) |

| June 28 Quarter-finals | France | 1–2 | United States | Paris, France |
| 15:00 ET | Renard 81' | Report | Rapinoe 5', 65' | Stadium: Parc des Princes; Attendance: 45,595; Referee: Kateryna Monzul (Ukraine) |

| July 2 Semi-finals | England | 1–2 | United States | Décines-Charpieu, France |
| 15:00 ET | White 19' | Report | Press 10'; Morgan 31' | Stadium: Parc Olympique Lyonnais; Attendance: 53,512; Referee: Edina Alves Batista (Brazil) |

====== Final ======
7 July 2019
17:00

| United States | 2–0 | Netherlands |
|---|---|---|
| Rapinoe 61' (pen.); Lavelle 69' | Report |

Parc Olympique Lyonnais, Décines-Charpieu
Attendance: 57,900
Referee: Stéphanie Frappart (France)

===== Goalscorers =====
Goals are current as of November 10, 2019, after the match against Costa Rica.

| Player | Goals |
|---|---|
| Carli Lloyd | 16 |
| Alex Morgan | 9 |
| Megan Rapinoe | 9 |
| Tobin Heath | 7 |
| Sam Mewis | 6 |
| Mallory Pugh | 6 |
| Lindsey Horan | 5 |
| Christen Press | 5 |
| Rose Lavelle | 4 |
| Allie Long | 2 |
| Lynn Williams | 2 |
| Morgan Brian | 2 |
| Jessica McDonald | 1 |
| Julie Ertz | 1 |
| own goal | 2 |

===== Managerial changes =====
This is a list of changes of managers:

| Team | Outgoing manager | Manner of departure | Date of departure | Incoming manager | Date of appointment |
|---|---|---|---|---|---|
| United States | (England) Jill Ellis | Resigned | October 6 | (North Macedonia) Vlatko Andonovski | October 28 |

== Club competitions ==
=== Men's ===
==== League competitions ====
===== Major League Soccer =====
====== Conference tables ======
Eastern Conference

2019 MLS Eastern Conference standings
| Pos | Team | Pld | W | L | T | GF | GA | GD | Pts | Qualification |
|---|---|---|---|---|---|---|---|---|---|---|
| 1 | New York City FC | 34 | 18 | 6 | 10 | 63 | 42 | +21 | 64 | MLS Cup Conference Semifinals |
| 2 | Atlanta United FC | 34 | 18 | 12 | 4 | 58 | 43 | +15 | 58 | MLS Cup First Round |
| 3 | Philadelphia Union | 34 | 16 | 11 | 7 | 58 | 50 | +8 | 55 | MLS Cup First Round |
| 4 | Toronto FC | 34 | 13 | 10 | 11 | 57 | 52 | +5 | 50 | MLS Cup First Round |
| 5 | D.C. United | 34 | 13 | 10 | 11 | 42 | 38 | +4 | 50 | MLS Cup First Round |
| 6 | New York Red Bulls | 34 | 14 | 14 | 6 | 53 | 51 | +2 | 48 | MLS Cup First Round |
| 7 | New England Revolution | 34 | 11 | 11 | 12 | 50 | 57 | −7 | 45 | MLS Cup First Round |
| 8 | Chicago Fire | 34 | 10 | 12 | 12 | 55 | 47 | +8 | 42 | |
| 9 | Montreal Impact | 34 | 12 | 17 | 5 | 47 | 60 | −13 | 41 | |
| 10 | Columbus Crew SC | 34 | 10 | 16 | 8 | 39 | 47 | −8 | 38 | |
| 11 | Orlando City SC | 34 | 9 | 15 | 10 | 44 | 52 | −8 | 37 | |
| 12 | FC Cincinnati | 34 | 6 | 22 | 6 | 31 | 75 | −44 | 24 | |

Source: MLS
Rules for classification: 1) points; 2) total wins; 3) total goal differential; 4) total goals scored; 5) disciplinary points; 6) away goal differential; 7) away goals scored; 8) home goals scored; 9) home goal differential; 10) coin toss or drawing of lots.

Western Conference

2019 MLS Western Conference standings
| Pos | Team | Pld | W | L | T | GF | GA | GD | Pts | Qualification |
|---|---|---|---|---|---|---|---|---|---|---|
| 1 | Los Angeles FC | 34 | 21 | 4 | 9 | 85 | 37 | +48 | 72 | MLS Cup Conference Semifinals |
| 2 | Seattle Sounders FC | 34 | 16 | 10 | 8 | 51 | 49 | +2 | 56 | MLS Cup First Round |
| 3 | Real Salt Lake | 34 | 16 | 13 | 5 | 45 | 41 | +4 | 53 | MLS Cup First Round |
| 4 | Minnesota United FC | 34 | 15 | 11 | 8 | 52 | 42 | +10 | 53 | MLS Cup First Round |
| 5 | LA Galaxy | 34 | 16 | 15 | 3 | 56 | 55 | +1 | 51 | MLS Cup First Round |
| 6 | Portland Timbers | 34 | 14 | 13 | 7 | 49 | 48 | +1 | 49 | MLS Cup First Round |
| 7 | FC Dallas | 34 | 13 | 12 | 9 | 48 | 46 | +2 | 48 | MLS Cup First Round |
| 8 | San Jose Earthquakes | 34 | 13 | 16 | 5 | 51 | 52 | −1 | 44 | |
| 9 | Colorado Rapids | 34 | 12 | 16 | 6 | 57 | 60 | −3 | 42 | |
| 10 | Houston Dynamo | 34 | 12 | 18 | 4 | 45 | 57 | −12 | 40 | |
| 11 | Sporting Kansas City | 34 | 10 | 16 | 8 | 49 | 67 | −18 | 38 | |
| 12 | Vancouver Whitecaps FC | 34 | 8 | 16 | 10 | 37 | 58 | −21 | 34 | |

Source: MLS
Rules for classification: 1) points; 2) total wins; 3) total goal differential; 4) total goals scored; 5) disciplinary points; 6) away goal differential; 7) away goals scored; 8) home goals scored; 9) home goal differential; 10) coin toss or drawing of lots

====== Overall 2019 table ======
Note: the table below has no impact on playoff qualification and is used solely for determining host of the MLS Cup, certain CCL spots, the Supporters' Shield trophy, seeding in the 2020 Canadian Championship, and 2020 MLS draft. The conference tables are the sole determinant for teams qualifying for the playoffs.

2019 MLS regular season standings
| Pos | Team | Pld | W | L | T | GF | GA | GD | Pts | Qualification |
|---|---|---|---|---|---|---|---|---|---|---|
| 1 | Los Angeles FC (S) | 34 | 21 | 4 | 9 | 85 | 37 | +48 | 72 | CONCACAF Champions League |
| 2 | New York City FC | 34 | 18 | 6 | 10 | 63 | 42 | +21 | 64 | CONCACAF Champions League |
| 3 | Atlanta United FC | 34 | 18 | 12 | 4 | 58 | 43 | +15 | 58 | CONCACAF Champions League |
| 4 | Seattle Sounders FC (C) | 34 | 16 | 10 | 8 | 52 | 49 | +3 | 56 | CONCACAF Champions League |
| 5 | Philadelphia Union | 34 | 16 | 11 | 7 | 58 | 50 | +8 | 55 | |
| 6 | Real Salt Lake | 34 | 16 | 13 | 5 | 46 | 41 | +5 | 53 | |
| 7 | Minnesota United FC | 34 | 15 | 11 | 8 | 52 | 43 | +9 | 53 | |
| 8 | LA Galaxy | 34 | 16 | 15 | 3 | 58 | 59 | −1 | 51 | |
| 9 | Toronto FC | 34 | 13 | 10 | 11 | 57 | 52 | +5 | 50 | |
| 10 | D.C. United | 34 | 13 | 10 | 11 | 42 | 38 | +4 | 50 | |
| 11 | Portland Timbers | 34 | 14 | 13 | 7 | 52 | 49 | +3 | 49 | |
| 12 | New York Red Bulls | 34 | 14 | 14 | 6 | 53 | 51 | +2 | 48 | |
| 13 | FC Dallas | 34 | 13 | 12 | 9 | 54 | 46 | +8 | 48 | |
| 14 | New England Revolution | 34 | 11 | 11 | 12 | 50 | 57 | −7 | 45 | |
| 15 | San Jose Earthquakes | 34 | 13 | 16 | 5 | 52 | 55 | −3 | 44 | |
| 16 | Colorado Rapids | 34 | 12 | 16 | 6 | 58 | 63 | −5 | 42 | |
| 17 | Chicago Fire | 34 | 10 | 12 | 12 | 55 | 47 | +8 | 42 | |
| 18 | Montreal Impact | 34 | 12 | 17 | 5 | 47 | 60 | −13 | 41 | CONCACAF Champions League |
| 19 | Houston Dynamo | 34 | 12 | 18 | 4 | 49 | 59 | −10 | 40 | |
| 20 | Columbus Crew SC | 34 | 10 | 16 | 8 | 39 | 47 | −8 | 38 | |
| 21 | Sporting Kansas City | 34 | 10 | 16 | 8 | 49 | 67 | −18 | 38 | |
| 22 | Orlando City SC | 34 | 9 | 15 | 10 | 44 | 52 | −8 | 37 | |
| 23 | Vancouver Whitecaps FC | 34 | 8 | 16 | 10 | 37 | 59 | −22 | 34 | |
| 24 | FC Cincinnati | 34 | 6 | 22 | 6 | 31 | 75 | −44 | 24 | |

Source: MLS
Rules for classification: 1) points; 2) total wins; 3) total goal differential; 4) total goals scored; 5) disciplinary points; 6) away goals scored; 7) away goal differential; 8) coin toss or drawing of lots
(C) MLS Cup champion; (S) Supporters' Shield winner

====== MLS Playoffs ======
First round October 19–20 | Conference semifinals October 23–24
E1 | New York City FC | 1
E4 | **Toronto FC** | **2**
E4 | **Toronto FC (a.e.t.)** | **5**
E5 | D.C. United | 1
**Eastern Conference**
E2 | **Atlanta United FC** | **1**
E7 | New England Revolution | 0
E2 | **Atlanta United FC** | **2**
E3 | Philadelphia Union | 0
E3 | **Philadelphia Union (a.e.t.)** | **4**
E6 | New York Red Bulls | 3
W1 | **Los Angeles FC** | **5**
W5 | LA Galaxy | 3
W4 | Minnesota United FC | 1
W5 | **LA Galaxy** | **2**
**Western Conference**
W2 | **Seattle Sounders FC (a.e.t.)** | **4**
W7 | FC Dallas | 3
W2 | **Seattle Sounders FC** | **2**
W3 | Real Salt Lake | 0
W3 | **Real Salt Lake** | **2**
W6 | Portland Timbers | 1

Conference finals October 29–30
E4 | **Toronto FC** | **2**
E2 | Atlanta United FC | 1
W1 | Los Angeles FC | 1
W2 | **Seattle Sounders FC** | **3**

MLS Cup; November 10
E4 | Toronto FC | 1
W2 | **Seattle Sounders FC** | **3**

Note: The higher seeded team hosted matches, with the MLS Cup host determined by overall points.
Source: 2019 MLS Cup Playoffs Bracket

====== MLS Cup ======
November 10, 2019
12:00 p.m. PST

| Seattle Sounders FC | 3–1 | Toronto FC |
|---|---|---|
| Leerdam 57'; Rodríguez 76'; Ruidíaz 90' | Report | Altidore 90+3' |

CenturyLink Field, Seattle, Washington
Attendance: 69,274
Referee: Allen Chapman

===== USL Championship =====
Renamed from United Soccer League (USL) after the 2018 season

====== Conference tables ======
Eastern Conference

| Pos | Team | Pld | W | D | L | GF | GA | GD | Pts | Qualification |
|---|---|---|---|---|---|---|---|---|---|---|
| 1 | Pittsburgh Riverhounds SC | 34 | 19 | 11 | 4 | 58 | 30 | +28 | 68 | Conference Quarterfinals |
| 2 | Nashville SC | 34 | 20 | 7 | 7 | 59 | 26 | +33 | 67 | Conference Quarterfinals |
| 3 | Indy Eleven | 34 | 19 | 6 | 9 | 48 | 29 | +19 | 63 | Conference Quarterfinals |
| 4 | Louisville City FC | 34 | 17 | 9 | 8 | 58 | 41 | +17 | 60 | Conference Quarterfinals |
| 5 | Tampa Bay Rowdies | 34 | 16 | 10 | 8 | 61 | 33 | +28 | 58 | Conference Quarterfinals |
| 6 | New York Red Bulls II | 34 | 17 | 6 | 11 | 74 | 51 | +23 | 57 | Conference Quarterfinals |
| 7 | North Carolina FC | 34 | 16 | 8 | 10 | 57 | 37 | +20 | 56 | Play-In Round |
| 8 | Ottawa Fury FC | 34 | 14 | 10 | 10 | 50 | 43 | +7 | 52 | Play-In Round |
| 9 | Charleston Battery | 34 | 11 | 13 | 10 | 44 | 44 | 0 | 46 | Play-In Round |
| 10 | Birmingham Legion FC | 34 | 12 | 7 | 15 | 35 | 51 | −16 | 43 | Play-In Round |
| 11 | Saint Louis FC | 34 | 11 | 9 | 14 | 40 | 41 | −1 | 42 | |
| 12 | Loudoun United FC | 34 | 11 | 6 | 17 | 59 | 65 | −6 | 39 | |
| 13 | Charlotte Independence | 34 | 9 | 11 | 14 | 42 | 53 | −11 | 38 | |
| 14 | Atlanta United 2 | 34 | 9 | 8 | 17 | 45 | 77 | −32 | 35 | |
| 15 | Memphis 901 FC | 34 | 9 | 7 | 18 | 37 | 52 | −15 | 34 | |
| 16 | Bethlehem Steel FC | 34 | 8 | 7 | 19 | 49 | 78 | −29 | 31 | |
| 17 | Hartford Athletic | 34 | 8 | 5 | 21 | 49 | 80 | −31 | 29 | |
| 18 | Swope Park Rangers | 34 | 6 | 8 | 20 | 46 | 80 | −34 | 26 | |

Source: USL Championship Standings
Rules for classification: 1) total wins; 2) total goal differential; 3) total goals scored; 4) points earned against top four Conference finishers; 5) disciplinary points; 6) coin toss or drawing of lots

Western Conference

| Pos | Team | Pld | W | D | L | GF | GA | GD | Pts | Qualification |
|---|---|---|---|---|---|---|---|---|---|---|
| 1 | Phoenix Rising FC (X) | 34 | 24 | 6 | 4 | 89 | 36 | +53 | 78 | Conference Quarterfinals |
| 2 | Reno 1868 FC | 34 | 18 | 6 | 10 | 72 | 51 | +21 | 60 | Conference Quarterfinals |
| 3 | Fresno FC | 34 | 16 | 9 | 9 | 58 | 44 | +14 | 57 | Conference Quarterfinals |
| 4 | Real Monarchs (C) | 34 | 16 | 8 | 10 | 71 | 53 | +18 | 56 | Conference Quarterfinals |
| 5 | Orange County SC | 34 | 15 | 9 | 10 | 54 | 43 | +11 | 54 | Conference Quarterfinals |
| 6 | El Paso Locomotive FC | 34 | 13 | 11 | 10 | 42 | 36 | +6 | 50 | Conference Quarterfinals |
| 7 | Sacramento Republic | 34 | 14 | 6 | 14 | 50 | 43 | +7 | 48 | Play-In Round |
| 8 | Austin Bold FC | 34 | 13 | 9 | 12 | 53 | 52 | +1 | 48 | Play-In Round |
| 9 | LA Galaxy II | 34 | 12 | 12 | 10 | 59 | 62 | −3 | 48 | Play-In Round |
| 10 | New Mexico United | 34 | 11 | 13 | 10 | 59 | 57 | +2 | 46 | Play-In Round |
| 11 | San Antonio FC | 34 | 12 | 9 | 13 | 62 | 57 | +5 | 45 | |
| 12 | Rio Grande Valley Toros | 34 | 11 | 8 | 15 | 50 | 58 | −8 | 41 | |
| 13 | Las Vegas Lights FC | 34 | 11 | 8 | 15 | 46 | 56 | −10 | 41 | |
| 14 | Portland Timbers 2 | 34 | 10 | 8 | 16 | 65 | 71 | −6 | 38 | |
| 15 | OKC Energy FC | 34 | 9 | 11 | 14 | 45 | 58 | −13 | 38 | |
| 16 | Tulsa Roughnecks | 34 | 8 | 10 | 16 | 45 | 69 | −24 | 34 | |
| 17 | Tacoma Defiance | 34 | 8 | 7 | 19 | 42 | 82 | −40 | 31 | |
| 18 | Colorado Springs Switchbacks | 34 | 7 | 6 | 21 | 31 | 65 | −34 | 27 | |

Source: USL Championship Standings
Rules for classification: 1) total wins; 2) total goal differential; 3) total goals scored; 4) points earned against top four Conference finishers; 5) disciplinary points; 6) coin toss or drawing of lots
(C) Champions; (X) Regular Season League Champion

====== USL Championship Final ======
November 17, 2019
7:30 PM EST

| Louisville City FC | 1–3 | Real Monarchs SLC |
|---|---|---|
| Rasmussen 6'; Williams (yellow card) 89' | Report | Holt 25', (yellow card) 69'; Plewa 45'; Schmitt (yellow card) 59'; Powder 66' |

Lynn Stadium, Louisville, Kentucky
Attendance: 7,025
Referee: Tim Ford

===== USL League One =====
Inaugural season

| Pos | Team | Pld | W | D | L | GF | GA | GD | Pts | Qualification |
|---|---|---|---|---|---|---|---|---|---|---|
| 1 | North Texas SC | 28 | 17 | 5 | 6 | 53 | 31 | +22 | 56 | Playoffs |
| 2 | Lansing Ignite FC | 28 | 12 | 10 | 6 | 49 | 37 | +12 | 46 | Playoffs |
| 3 | Greenville Triumph SC | 28 | 12 | 7 | 9 | 32 | 22 | +10 | 43 | Playoffs |
| 4 | Forward Madison FC | 28 | 12 | 7 | 9 | 33 | 26 | +7 | 43 | Playoffs |
| 5 | Chattanooga Red Wolves SC | 28 | 10 | 10 | 8 | 35 | 37 | −2 | 40 | |
| 6 | South Georgia Tormenta FC | 28 | 9 | 10 | 9 | 32 | 34 | −2 | 37 | |
| 7 | Toronto FC II | 28 | 9 | 9 | 10 | 43 | 46 | −3 | 36 | |
| 8 | FC Tucson | 28 | 8 | 9 | 11 | 35 | 41 | −6 | 33 | |
| 9 | Richmond Kickers | 28 | 9 | 5 | 14 | 26 | 35 | −9 | 32 | |
| 10 | Orlando City B | 28 | 4 | 4 | 20 | 23 | 52 | −29 | 16 | |

Source: 2019 USL League One standings
Rules for classification: 1) total wins; 2) total goal differential; 3) total goals scored; 4) points earned against top four Conference finishers; 5) disciplinary points; 6) coin toss or drawing of lots

===== National Independent Soccer Association =====
Fall Season
East Coast standings

| Pos | Team | Pld | W | D | L | GF | GA | GD | Pts | Qualification |
|---|---|---|---|---|---|---|---|---|---|---|
| 1 | Miami FC (O) | 6 | 4 | 2 | 0 | 19 | 6 | +13 | **14** | East Coast Championship |
| 2 | Stumptown Athletic | 6 | 4 | 0 | 2 | 13 | 7 | +6 | **12** | East Coast Championship |
| 3 | Atlanta SC | 6 | 2 | 2 | 2 | 13 | 10 | +3 | **8** | |
| 4 | Philadelphia Fury | 6 | 0 | 0 | 6 | 1 | 23 | −22 | **0** | Withdrew (Note: Philadelphia Fury withdrew after one match and forfeited their remaining matches) |

Source: NISAofficial.com
(O) Play-off winners
Notes:

West Coast standings

| Pos | Team | Pld | W | D | L | GF | GA | GD | Pts | Qualification |
|---|---|---|---|---|---|---|---|---|---|---|
| 1 | Los Angeles Force | 6 | 3 | 2 | 1 | 8 | 7 | +1 | **11** | West Coast Championship |
| 2 | California United Strikers FC (O) | 6 | 2 | 3 | 1 | 13 | 9 | +4 | **9** | West Coast Championship |
| 3 | San Diego 1904 FC | 6 | 2 | 0 | 4 | 9 | 15 | −6 | **6** | |
| 4 | Oakland Roots SC | 6 | 0 | 3 | 3 | 10 | 13 | −3 | **3** | |

Source: NISAofficial.com
(O) Play-off winners

==== Cup competitions ====
===== US Open Cup =====
====== Final ======
August 27, 2019
8:00 p.m. EDT

| Atlanta United FC | 2–1 | Minnesota United FC |
|---|---|---|
| Gasper 10' (o.g.); G. Martínez 16' | Report | Lod 47' |

Mercedes-Benz Stadium, Atlanta, Georgia
Attendance: 35,709
Referee: Allen Chapman

==== International competitions ====
===== CONCACAF competitions =====
====== 2019 CONCACAF Champions League ======
| Club | Competition | Final round |
|---|---|---|
| Atlanta United FC | 2019 CONCACAF Champions League | Quarter-finals |
| Sporting Kansas City | 2019 CONCACAF Champions League | Semi-finals |
| Houston Dynamo | 2019 CONCACAF Champions League | Quarter-finals |
| New York Red Bulls | 2019 CONCACAF Champions League | Quarter-finals |

teams in bold are still active in the competition

====== Round of 16 ======
| Team 1 | Agg. | Team 2 | 1st leg | 2nd leg |
|---|---|---|---|---|
| Atlético Pantoja (Dominican Republic) | 0–5 | (United States) **New York Red Bulls** | 0–2 | 0–3 |
| Guastatoya (Guatemala) | 1–3 | (United States) **Houston Dynamo** | 0–1 | 1–2 |
| **Sporting Kansas City** (United States) | 5–0 | (Mexico) Toluca | 3–0 | 2–0 |
| Herediano (Costa Rica) | 3–5 | (United States) **Atlanta United FC** | 3–1 | 0–4 |

====== Quarter-finals ======
| Team 1 | Agg. | Team 2 | 1st leg | 2nd leg |
|---|---|---|---|---|
| New York Red Bulls (United States) | 2–6 | (Mexico) **Santos Laguna** | 0–2 | 2–4 |
| Houston Dynamo (United States) | 0–3 | (Mexico) **UANL** | 0–2 | 0–1 |
| Independiente (Panama) | 2–4 | (United States) **Sporting Kansas City** | 2–1 | 0–3 |
| **Monterrey** (Mexico) | 3–1 | (United States) Atlanta United FC | 3–0 | 0–1 |

====== Semi-finals ======
| Team 1 | Agg. | Team 2 | 1st leg | 2nd leg |
|---|---|---|---|---|
| **Monterrey** (Mexico) | 10–2 | (United States) Sporting Kansas City | 5–0 | 5–2 |

===== Leagues Cup =====
| Club | Competition | Final round |
|---|---|---|
| Chicago Fire | 2019 Leagues Cup | Quarter-finals |
| LA Galaxy | 2019 Leagues Cup | Semi-finals |
| Houston Dynamo | 2019 Leagues Cup | Quarter-finals |
| Real Salt Lake | 2019 Leagues Cup | Quarter-finals |

teams in bold are still active in the competition

====== Quarter-finals ======
| Team 1 | Score | Team 2 |
|---|---|---|
| Chicago Fire (United States) | 0–2 | (Mexico) **Cruz Azul** |
| **LA Galaxy** (United States) | 2–2(3–1 p) | (Mexico) Tijuana |
| Houston Dynamo (United States) | 1–1(5–6 p) | (Mexico) **América** |
| Real Salt Lake (United States) | 0–1 | (Mexico) **UANL** |

====== Semi-finals ======
| Team 1 | Score | Team 2 |
|---|---|---|
| LA Galaxy (United States) | 1–2 | (Mexico) **Cruz Azul** |

===== Campeones Cup =====
August 14, 2019

| Atlanta United FC (United States) | 3–2 | (Mexico) América |
|---|---|---|
| Hyndman 5'; Larentowicz 59'; J. Martínez 65' (pen.) | Report | Ibarra 13'; R. Martínez 57' |

Mercedes-Benz Stadium, Atlanta, Georgia
Attendance: 40,128
Referee: Joel Aguilar (El Salvador)

=== Women's ===
==== League competitions ====
===== National Women's Soccer League =====
====== Overall table ======
| Pos | Team | Pld | W | D | L | GF | GA | GD | Pts | Qualification |
|---|---|---|---|---|---|---|---|---|---|---|
| 1 | North Carolina Courage (C) | 24 | 15 | 4 | 5 | 54 | 23 | +31 | 49 | NWSL Shield |
| 2 | Chicago Red Stars | 24 | 14 | 2 | 8 | 41 | 28 | +13 | 44 | NWSL Playoffs |
| 3 | Portland Thorns FC | 24 | 11 | 7 | 6 | 40 | 31 | +9 | 40 | NWSL Playoffs |
| 4 | Reign FC | 24 | 10 | 8 | 6 | 27 | 27 | 0 | 38 | NWSL Playoffs |
| 5 | Washington Spirit | 24 | 9 | 7 | 8 | 30 | 25 | +5 | 34 | |
| 6 | Utah Royals FC | 24 | 10 | 4 | 10 | 25 | 25 | 0 | 34 | |
| 7 | Houston Dash | 24 | 7 | 5 | 12 | 21 | 36 | −15 | 26 | |
| 8 | Sky Blue FC | 24 | 5 | 5 | 14 | 20 | 34 | −14 | 20 | |
| 9 | Orlando Pride | 24 | 4 | 4 | 16 | 24 | 53 | −29 | 16 | |

Source: NWSL
Rules for classification: Tiebreakers
(C) Champions

====== NWSL Playoffs ======
**Semi-finals**
**1** | **North Carolina Courage** | **4**
4 | Reign FC | 1
**2** | **Chicago Red Stars** | **1**
3 | Portland Thorns FC | 0

**Championship**
**1** | **North Carolina Courage** | **4**
2 | Chicago Red Stars | 0

October 27, 2019
4:00pm (EDT)

| North Carolina Courage | 4–0 | Chicago Red Stars |
|---|---|---|
| Debinha 8'; McDonald 26'; Dunn 45+5'; Mewis 61'; Zerboni (yellow card) 74' | Report | DiBernardo (yellow card) 47'; Ertz (yellow card) 67' |

Sahlen’s Stadium at WakeMed Soccer Park
Cary, North Carolina
Attendance: 10,227
Referee: Rosendo Mendoza

== Honors ==
=== Professional ===
Men
| Competition | | Winner |
|---|---|---|
| U.S. Open Cup | | Atlanta United FC |
| MLS Supporters' Shield | | Los Angeles FC |
| MLS Cup | | Seattle Sounders FC |
| USL Championship | Regular season | Phoenix Rising FC |
| USL Championship | Playoffs | Real Monarchs SLC |
| USL League One | Regular season | North Texas SC |
| USL League One | Playoffs | North Texas SC |
| NISA | Fall 2019 | Miami FC (East); California United Strikers FC (West) |

Women
| Competition | Winner |
|---|---|
| NWSL Championship | North Carolina Courage |
| NWSL Shield | North Carolina Courage |
| Women's Premier Soccer League | Pensacola FC Women |
| United Women's Soccer | LA Galaxy Orange County |

=== Amateur ===
Men
| Competition | Team |
|---|---|
| USL League Two | Flint City Bucks |
| National Premier Soccer League | Miami FC |
| National Amateur Cup | Newtown Pride FC |
| NCAA Division I Soccer Championship | Georgetown |
| NCAA Division II Men's Soccer Championship | Charleston (WV) |
| NCAA Division III Men's Soccer Championship | Tufts University |
| NAIA Soccer Championship | Central Methodist University |

Women
| Competition | Team |
|---|---|
| NCAA Division I Soccer Championship | Stanford University |
| NCAA Division II Soccer Championship | Grand Valley State University |
| NCAA Division III Soccer Championship | Messiah College |
| NAIA Soccer Championship | Keiser University |
