= Nadre Butcher =

Barbadian footballer

Personal information
- Full name: Nadre Tyreese Isaac Butcher
- Date of birth: 6 March 2004 (age 22)
- Place of birth: Bridgetown, Barbados
- Height: 1.70 m (5 ft 7 in)
- Position: Forward

Team information
- Current team: Real SC
- Number: 10

Youth career
- –2022: Pro Shottas United

Senior career*
Years	Team	Apps	(Gls)
2022	SpVg Solingen-Wald 03	4	(1)
2022–2023	Weymouth Wales		
2023–2024	Bray Wanderers	2	(0)
2024–2025	Weymouth Wales		
2025–	Real SC	45	(17)

International career^{‡}
2019	Barbados U15	8	(5)
2022	Barbados U20	3	(0)
2022–	Barbados	24	(1)
- * Club domestic league appearances and goals as of 15:07, 29 August 2026 (UTC) ‡ National team caps and goals as of 12:13, 17 November 2023 (UTC)

Nadre Butcher (born 6 March 2004) is a Barbadian footballer who plays as a forward for Real Sport Clube of the Campeonato de Portugal and the Barbados national team.

== Club career ==
As a youth Butcher played for Pro Shottas United and was the youth tournament's joint top goal scorer in 2019.

In August 2022 Butcher and fellow-Bajan Honor Bradshaw joined SpVg Solingen-Wald 03 of the German Bezirksliga. In total he made four league appearances for the club, scoring one goal. His lone tally came against Sportfreunde Baumberg II on 4 September 2022. After his short stint in Germany, Butcher returned to Barbados and joined Weymouth Wales

In summer 2023, Butcher went on trial with League of Ireland First Division club Bray Wanderers. After a successful friendly appearance against Scottish Premiership club Dundee in which he scored his club's only goal, Bray Wanderers signed Butcher on 5 July 2023. He made his league debut for the club, playing the full match, against Finn Harps on 7 July.

Following his stint with Bray Wanderers, Butcher returned to Barbados for another brief stint with Weymouth Wales. In January 2025, it was announced that he had signed a two-year deal with Real Sport Clube of the AF Lisboa 1ª Divisão, the fourth tier of the Portuguese football league system.

== International career ==
At the youth level, Butcher represented Barbados in the 2019 CONCACAF Boys' Under-15 Championship and 2021 CONCACAF U-20 Championship qualifying. In the former competition he scored his team's only two goals, one against Trinidad and Tobago and a second against Costa Rica. In preparation for the tournament he scored in a 6–0 friendly victory over Sint Maarten and a brace in a 3–0 victory over Puerto Rico.

In January 2022 Butcher was called up to the senior squad for a series of friendlies ahead of the 2022–23 CONCACAF Nations League B. He went on to make his senior international debut on 28 January 2022 in a 0–1 friendly defeat away to Suriname.

== Career statistics ==
As of match played 23 August 2026.

Barbados national team
Year	Apps	Goals
2022	6	0
2023	11	1
2024	5	0
2026	2	0
Total	24	1

Scores and results list Barbados's goal tally first.

No.	Date	Venue	Opponent	Score	Result	Competition
1.	26 February 2023	Kirani James Athletic Stadium St. George's, Grenada	Grenada	2–2	2–2	Friendly
Last updated 27 February 2023
