= Marco Cruz =

Portuguese footballer (born 2004)

Personal information
- Full name: Marco Souza Cruz
- Date of birth: 23 February 2004 (age 22)
- Place of birth: Póvoa de Varzim, Portugal
- Height: 1.81 m (5 ft 11 in)
- Position: Attacking midfielder

Team information
- Current team: Vitória de Guimarães

Youth career
- 2012–2021: Porto
- 2021–2022: Sporting CP

Senior career*
Years	Team	Apps	(Gls)
2022–2024	Sporting CP B	29	(3)
2024–	Vitória de Guimarães	2	(0)
2025–2026	→ Marítimo (loan)	26	(0)

International career
2019	Portugal U15	4	(1)
2019–2020	Portugal U16	11	(3)
2021–2022	Portugal U18	13	(0)
2022–2024	Portugal U20	9	(0)
- * Club domestic league appearances and goals as of 6 September 2026

Marco Sousa Cruz (born 23 February 2004) is a Portuguese footballer who plays as an attacking midfielder for Primeira Liga club Vitória de Guimarães.

== Club career ==
Born in Póvoa de Varzim in the Porto metropolitan area, Cruz began playing for the youth teams of local Porto in 2012. At the end of the transfer window in September 2021, he was transferred to Sporting CP in exchange for Rodrigo Fernandes, and began his senior career with the B-team, eventually being released in June 2024.

On 13 June 2024, Cruz signed a four-year deal at Vitória de Guimarães. He made his debut on 25 July in a UEFA Conference League second qualifying round first leg away to Floriana in Malta, playing the last minute of a 1–0 win as a substitute; he made two appearances off the bench in the Primeira Liga over the season.

Cruz was loaned to Liga Portugal 2 club Marítimo on 16 July 2025 for one year, with the option to buy. On his return, after winning promotion as champions, he was left out of the Vitória squad by manager Tiago Margarido, having two years left on his contract.

== International career ==
Cruz won a CONCACAF tournament in Bradenton, Florida with the Portugal under-16 team in August 2019. He was part of the under-18 team at the 2022 Mediterranean Games in Algeria.
