= Tom Kljun =

Slovenian footballer (born 2004)

Personal information
- Date of birth: 29 January 2004 (age 22)
- Place of birth: Slovenia
- Height: 1.77 m (5 ft 10 in)
- Position: Winger

Team information
- Current team: Nafta 1903
- Number: 25

Youth career
- –2021: Celje
- 2023: Lecce

Senior career*
Years	Team	Apps	(Gls)
2020–2021	Celje	14	(0)
2021–2023	Tabor Sežana	37	(0)
2023	Lecce	0	(0)
2023–2024	Aluminij	16	(3)
2024–	Nafta 1903	0	(0)

International career
2018–2019	Slovenia U15	9	(1)
2019	Slovenia U16	8	(4)
2020	Slovenia U17	1	(0)
2021–2022	Slovenia U18	6	(0)
2021–2022	Slovenia U19	11	(2)
- * Club domestic league appearances and goals as of 25 June 2024

Tom Kljun (born 29 January 2004) is a Slovenian professional footballer who plays as a winger for Nafta 1903.

== Club career ==
Kljun is a youth product of Celje, where he signed his first professional contract in January 2020, before making his professional debut on 5 June, as he came on as a substitute for Luka Kerin in the injury time of a 2–0 PrvaLiga win against Rudar Velenje. At 16 years, 4 months and 7 days, he became the youngest ever player to feature for Celje in a league match. The club eventually went on to win the national title at the end of the same season.

In July 2021, Kljun joined fellow Slovenian side Tabor Sežana on a permanent deal.

On 17 January 2023, it was officially announced that Kljun agreed to join Serie A side Lecce for an undisclosed fee, being initially assigned to the club's under-19 team.

== International career ==
Kljun has represented Slovenia at all youth international levels up to the under-19 national team.

== Honours ==
Celje

- Slovenian PrvaLiga: 2019–20
