= Federico Oliva =

American soccer player

Personal information
- Full name: Federico Oliva Firpo
- Date of birth: July 22, 2004 (age 22)
- Place of birth: Chicago, Illinois, United States
- Position: Striker

Team information
- Current team: Trival Valderas

Youth career
- 2012–2021: Atlético Madrid
- 2022–: Almería

Senior career*
Years	Team	Apps	(Gls)
2022–2023	Almería B	1	(0)
2024–	Trival Valderas	6	(2)

International career^{‡}
2019	United States U15	9	(2)
2020–2021	United States U17	3	(0)
- * Club domestic league appearances and goals as of October 19, 2024 ‡ National team caps and goals as of February 24, 2020

Federico Oliva Firpo (born July 22, 2004) is an American soccer player who plays as a striker for Spanish club Trival Valderas.

== Early life ==
Born in Chicago, United States, Oliva grew up with a passion for football due to his strong South American heritage. His parents, who are both from Argentina, migrated to the United States for work before moving to Spain soon after when Oliva turned 8.

== Club career ==
=== Atlético Madrid ===
In 2012, Oliva was offered a trial to Atlético Madrid after impressing an Argentinian coach during a training session during which he impressed and was immediately signed by the club. During his time in the youth system, he would attract interest from multiple clubs in Spain due to his performances mainly in LaLiga Promises. Oliva played for the Juvenil A squad in 2021, showing significant improvement under youth coach and former Atléti player Fernando Torres.

=== UD Almeria ===
In September 2022, it was reported on social media that Oliva had agreed terms and was set to join Almería. He mainly played in the youth level for Almería until making his senior debut with the B-team against UD Maracena, coming off the bench in the 60th minute, in a 3–0 win.

== International career ==
Due to his birth in the United States, Oliva is eligible to play for the United States national team. Alternatively, he may choose to represent Argentina based on his parents' nationality or Spain after residing in the country for a period of 10 years.

He has represented the US at youth international level but has been contacted by the Argentine Football Association (AFA) about plans for using him in the squad for the future.

== Style of play ==
Oliva mainly plays as a winger or an attacking midfielder. He is described as having great change of pace, one on one, and scoring abilities.
